= Magical creatures in Harry Potter =

Aspect of the Harry Potter universe

A variety of magical creatures are depicted in the fictional universe of Harry Potter, which is drawn from various types of media. Magical creatures appear in the Harry Potter novels and their film adaptations, in the Fantastic Beasts film series, in other books by J. K. Rowling, and on the website of the Wizarding World media franchise. In 2001, Rowling released Fantastic Beasts and Where to Find Them, which serves as a guidebook to the creatures described in the fictional universe. Some of these creatures were invented by Rowling. Others are derived from sources such as Greek mythology, English and Celtic folklore, and the works of Roman historians.

In the Harry Potter universe, Magizoology is the study of magical creatures. There are magizoologists who work in the Ministry of Magic, particularly in the department for the Regulation and Control of Magical Creatures. One notable magizoologist is Newt Scamander, who is the author of the in-universe book Fantastic Beasts and Where to Find Them. He is the protagonist of the Fantastic Beasts series of films, which serve as prequels to the Harry Potter series.

== List of creatures ==
=== A ===
- Acromantula – A gigantic spider that resembles the wolf spider and is capable of human speech. Rubeus Hagrid was expelled from Hogwarts for possessing an Acromantula named Aragog, who was falsely believed to be the monster from the Chamber of Secrets. Acromantulas are known to dwell in the Forbidden Forest.
- Ashwinder – A serpent-like creature created from the ashes of a magical fire.
- Augurey – A greyish-green, mournful-looking bird also known as the "Irish Phoenix". In Harry Potter and the Cursed Child, Lord Voldemort's followers are marked with a tattoo of an Augurey.

=== B ===
- Banshee – A female spirit who heralds the death of a family member, usually by shrieking or keening.
- Basilisk – A giant snake. A person or animal will die if they make direct eye contact with a Basilisk, but will be merely Petrified (immobilized) if they make indirect eye contact, such as through a mirror. A Basilisk is created by having a toad sit on and hatch a chicken's egg. The Basilisk is the creature that lurks in the Chamber of Secrets and wreaks havoc at Hogwarts under the command of one of Lord Voldmort's horcruxes.
- Bicorn – A cow-like creature that sheds its horns annually. Its horns are an ingredient in Polyjuice Potion.
- Bigfoot – A humanoid ape-like creature native to North America.
- Billywig – An Australian stinging insect rarely noticed by Muggles. Victims stung will experience giddiness, followed by levitation. Several billywigs escape from Newt Scamander's suitcase in the film Fantastic Beasts and Where to Find Them.
- Blast-Ended Skrewt – A cross between a Manticore and a Fire Crab created by Rubeus Hagrid.
- Bogeyman – A creature that haunts children when they are being naughty.
- Boggart – A shapeshifter that takes on the form of its victim's worst fear. Boggarts like to hide in dark, enclosed places, and it is unknown what form a Boggart takes when alone. In Prisoner of Azkaban, Remus Lupin teaches his students the Riddikulus charm to combat Boggarts. The spell makes a Boggart's appearance less fearsome or even comical.
- Bowtruckle – A tree-dwelling wooden creature that is difficult to spot. The trees they inhabit can be used to craft wands.
- Bugbear – A creature that is similar to a bogeyman and a boggart.
- Bundimun – A beast resembling a patch of greenish fungus with eyes.

=== C ===
- Caipora – A dwarf-like spirit-being native to Brazil.
- Centaur – A creature with a head and torso resembling those of a human, and with a lower body resembling that of a horse. Centaurs live in forests and are skilled in healing and astrology. Centaurs who associate with humans are often seen as traitors to their kind. In Deathly Hallows, centaurs fight against the Death Eaters in the Battle of Hogwarts.
- Chimaera – A creature with the head of a lion, the body of a goat, and the tail of a dragon.
- Chizpurfle – A crab-like parasite that dwells on Crups and Augureys.
- Chupacabra – A blood-sucking creature from Mexico that is half-lizard, half-homunculus.
- Clabbert – A tree-dwelling creature resembling a cross between a frog and a monkey.
- Cockatrice – A creature that resembles a rooster with a lizard tail. It can kill by staring at a victim.
- Crup – A magical breed of dog with a forked tail.

=== D ===
- Dementor – A tall, black-cloaked creature with hands that appear decayed. Dementors drain happiness from people and force them to relive their worst memories. Dementors are employed as guards at Azkaban and cannot be seen by Muggles. They can suck a person's soul out through their mouth, which is known as the Dementor's Kiss. They can be repelled by the Patronus Charm. Rowling has called Dementors "soulless creatures" and "among the foulest beings on Earth". She said they were inspired by her own experience of depression.
- Demiguise – An orangutan-like creature with precognition that can turn invisible. An escaped Demiguise plays a role in the film Fantastic Beasts and Where to Find Them. Demiguise pelts are often used to make invisibility cloaks.
- Diricawl – A bird that can disappear when threatened. Known as the dodo by Muggles. According to Newt Scamander, the bird's vanishing ability is the reason Muggles believe it is extinct.
- Doxy – A small fairy-like creature with four arms and four legs, also known as a Biting Fairy.
- Dragon– A winged fire-breathing reptile which has a certain degree of immunity to magical attacks. Dragon heartstring is frequently used in the creation of wands. Species of dragon include the Antipodean Opaleye, Chinese Fireball, Common Welsh Green, Hebridean Black, Hungarian Horntail, Norwegian Ridgeback, Peruvian Vipertooth, Romanian Longhorn, Swedish Short-Snout and Ukrainian Ironbelly.
- Dugbog – A crocodile-like creature that resembles a piece of wood while stationary.
- Dukuwaqa – A human that can turn into a shark.
- Dwarf – A short, stocky humanoid.

=== E ===
- Erlking – An elf-like creature that lures children with music before eating them.
- Erumpent – A rhinoceros-like creature that has explosive liquid in its horn. Xenophilius Lovegood has an Erumpent horn in his house which he falsely identifies as the horn of a "Crumple-Horned Snorkack".

=== F ===
- Fairy – A small humanoid with insect-like wings.
- Fire Crab – A Fire Crab resembles a cross between a tortoise and a crab. It shoots fire from its rear-end when threatened.
- Fire-Dwelling Salamander – A lizard-like creature that lives in and feeds on flames.
- Flesh-Eating Slug – A slug-like creature with corrosive spittle.
- Flobberworm – A toothless brown worm used in potion making which will die if overfed.
- Fwooper – A brightly coloured bird that has a high pitched, twittering song.

=== G ===
- Gargoyle – A statue that comes to life.
- Genie – A magical humanoid that can glide over water.
- Ghost– A spirit of a wizard who has died. In the novels, ghosts are described as silvery and translucent. They can pass through walls and other solid objects, but have some ability to interact with the living world. Ghosts can be affected by magic, though not as much as living beings.
- Ghoul – A creature that resembles a slimy buck-toothed ogre. A chameleon ghoul can disguise itself as an everyday object to evade detection.
- Giant – A humanoid creature much larger than a human. Giants have some immunity to magical attacks and can interbreed with humans, but wizards have actively driven them out of civilisation. Some giants fight for Voldemort during the Battle of Hogwarts. The Hogwarts gamekeeper Rubeus Hagrid is half-giant, and has a giant half-brother named Grawp.
- Glumbumble – An insect resembling a bumblebee. It produces a treacle that induces melancholy in those who consume it.
- Gnome – A small humanoid that is known to infest the gardens of wizarding households.
- Goblin – A short and stocky humanoid with black eyes, a domed head and long fingers. Goblins run Gringotts Bank and speak a language known as Gobbledegook. Relations between goblins and wizards have been strained for centuries. The depiction of goblins in Harry Potter has been compared to antisemitic depictions of Jewish people.
- Golden Snidget – A small golden bird that was used as the Golden Snitch in early versions of Quidditch.
- Gorgon – A humanoid with snakes for hair. Its stare can turn a person to stone.
- Graphorn – A creature that resembles a condylarth and a smilodon. It has horns on its head and slimy tentacles in its mouth.
- Griffin – A creature that is part-eagle, part-lion.
- Grindylow – A small horned water demon. Depicted with tentacles in the Harry Potter films.
- Gytrash – A dog-like spirit.

=== H ===
- Hag – An old, wizened witch.
- Harpy – A humanoid creature with wings.
- Hidebehind – A magical creature that is the result of illegally breeding a Demiguise and a ghoul.
- Hinkypunk – A diminutive, one-legged creature with the appearance of wispy blue, grey or white smoke. Hinkypunks use lanterns to lure unsuspecting people down the wrong path.
- Hippocampus – A sea creature with the head and front legs of a horse and the tail of a fish.
- Hippogriff– A creature that is part-eagle, part-horse. Wizards can own hippogriffs provided they cast a daily Disillusionment Charm on them. A hippogriff named Buckbeak is featured in Harry Potter and the Prisoner of Azkaban.
- Hodag – A cynodont-like creature with horns resembling a cross between a frog and a dog.
- Horklump – A pink fleshy creature resembling a mushroom.
- Horned Serpent – A giant sea serpent with horns.
- House-elf – A short, skinny elf similar to a brownie. House-elves are enslaved by wizards and often perform house chores. They are generally obedient and obsequious, and wear discarded items such as pillowcases or towels. A house-elf's master can free them by giving them an item of clothing. House-elves can Apparate. The enslavement of house-elves in Harry Potter has received varied responses. The British scholar Brycchan Carey praised the abolitionist sentiments in the novels, and viewed Hermione Granger's group SPEW (Society for the Promotion of Elfish Welfare) as a model for political engagement by young people. Farah Mendlesohn found the subjugation of house-elves "difficult to accept" due to the elves' reliance on others to liberate them. Mary Pharr described the enslavement of house-elves as a disharmonious element in the series.
- Hydra – A nine-headed serpentine creature.

=== I ===
- Inferius – A zombie-like creature reanimated using Dark magic.

=== J ===
- Jackalope – A jackrabbit-like creature with antlers.
- Jarvey – A ferret-like creature that can speak, but only in short and often rude statements.
- Jobberknoll – A bird that makes no sound until the moment before it dies. It then releases a long scream which consists of every sound it has ever heard, but backwards.

=== K ===
- Kappa – A Japanese river demon that can leave the water for short periods of time.
- Kelpie – A shapeshifting aquatic creature that often appears as a horse made of kelp. When mounted, it drags down and drowns its rider.
- Knarl – A hedgehog-like creature.
- Kneazle – A highly intelligent cat-like creature. A Kneazle can detect untrustworthy people.

=== L ===
- Leprechaun – A dwarf-like creature associated with gold that deceives both wizards and Muggles.
- Lethifold – A Dementor-like creature that has a taste for human flesh. Also known as the Living Shadow.
- Leucrotta – A moose-like creature with a large mouth.
- Lobalug – An aquatic creature that spits out venom when threatened. It is used as a weapon by merpeople.

=== M ===
- Mackled Malaclaw – A sea creature that resembles a lobster. A person who is bitten by a Malaclaw experiences bad luck for up to a week.
- Manticore – A creature with the head of a human, the body of a lion and the stinging tail of a scorpion.
- Marmite – A tiny squid-like creature which glows in the dark.
- Matagot – A cat-like creature that multiplies when attacked.
- Merpeople – Creatures that appear half-human and half-fish. Types of merpeople include mermaids, mermen, merrows, selkies and sirens.
- Moke – A lizard native to the British Isles that can shrink at will. Its hide is used to make purses and wallets that shrink when a stranger approaches.
- Mooncalf – A bovid-like creature that comes out of its burrow during a full moon.
- Murtlap – A hairless aquatic creature that resembles a large rat with soft, fleshy spines on its back.

=== N ===
- Niffler – A small desman-like creature with platypus-like features. Nifflers are obsessed with hoarding shiny objects, which they store in their bottomless pouch.
- Nogtail – A demon resembling a piglet that haunts farms and barnyards.
- Nundu – A giant leopard-like creature with toxic breath.

=== O ===
- Obscurial – A magical child who represses their magical abilities. If kept unchecked, this repression creates a Dark parasitic force known as an obscurus. The child and the obscurus together form a large, shadowy cloud which can cause destruction. Credence (aka Aralius Dumbledore), a character in the 2016 film Fantastic Beasts and Where to Find Them, is an obscurial.
- Occamy – A winged creature resembling a cross between a dragon and a bird. Its eggs are made of pure silver. The Occamy is choranaptyxic, meaning it will grow or shrink to fit available space.
- Ogre – A large humanoid creature resembling a buck-toothed ghoul.
- Oni – A humanoid demon from Japan with horns and multiple eyes.

=== P ===
- Phoenix – A bird that can reincarnate after death. It can carry immensely heavy loads and its tears have healing properties. Phoenix feathers are one of the three main wand cores. A hoo-hoo is a Japanese species of phoenix.
- Pixie – A tiny mischievous creature found in Britain and Ireland.
- Plimpy – A fish-like creature with legs. Considered a pest by merpeople.
- Pogrebin – A gnome-like demon resembling a rock.
- Poltergeist – A spirit that often haunts a particular building.
- Porlock – A small satyr-like creature that guards horses.
- Puffskein – A small, round creature covered in soft fur. A common pet for Wizarding children. Species of Puffskein include the Appaloosa Puffskein, Fanged Puffskein and Pygmy Puff.
- Pukwudgie – A species of goblin native to North America.

=== Q ===
- Qilin – A Chinese deer-like creature that can look into a person's soul. It was used to choose leaders in ancient times.
- Quintaped – A carnivorous five-legged creature resembling a starfish with a face.

=== R ===
- Ramora – A magical fish that guards fishermen.
- Red Cap – A dwarf-like creature resembling a goblin. It colours its hat with the blood of its victims.
- Re'em – A golden ox-like creature. Its blood can be consumed for increased strength.
- Runespoor – A three-headed giant serpent.

=== S ===
- Sea serpent – A giant snake-like creature that dwells in the ocean.
- Shrake – A magically created fish covered in spines.
- Snallygaster – A bird-dragon hybrid related to the Occamy.
- Sphinx – An Egyptian creature that has the head of a human and the body of a lion. Sphinxes are capable of human speech and are known for offering riddles, puzzles, and enigmas.
- Streeler – A giant snail that leaves a trail of poisonous slime.
- Swooping Evil – A venomous butterfly-like creature with the skull of a wolf. It feeds on human brains.

=== T ===
- Tebo – A warthog-like creature that can turn invisible when threatened.
- Tengu – A goblin-like creature from Japan with a long nose and wings.
- Thestral – A carnivorous species of winged horse visible only to those who have experienced loss through death. They are described as having dragon-like faces, blank white eyes, long manes, and large leathery wings. They possess a well-developed sense of smell, which leads them to carrion or fresh meat. According to Hagrid, they will not attack a human-sized target without provocation. Thestrals are capable of very fast flight for several hours at a time. Hogwarts has a herd of Thestrals which pull the carriages that transport students to and from the Hogsmeade train station. In Deathly Hallows, Thestrals attack the Death Eaters during the Battle of Hogwarts. Rowling has revealed that the Elder Wand has a core of Thestral hair.
- Three-Headed Dog – In Harry Potter and the Philosopher's Stone, a giant three-headed dog named Fluffy guards the Philosopher's Stone.
- Thunderbird – A bird-like creature with the power to cause thunderstorms. Mainly found in Arizona. In the film Fantastic Beasts and Where to Find Them, a thunderbird named Frank is rescued from traffickers by Newt Scamander. Near the end of the film, Frank creates a storm that erases the memories of the Muggles in New York City who were exposed to magic.
- Troll – A tall humanoid with immense strength, low intelligence and a certain degree of immunity to magical attacks. Some trolls can be trained to guard places and objects.
- Trollcleg – A type of fly that hovers around trolls.
- Trollwig – A kind of earwig that feeds on the earwax of trolls.

=== U ===
- Unicorn – A horse-like creature with a horn protruding from its forehead. Unicorn tail hairs are one of the three main wand cores, and unicorn horns are used in potions. In Harry Potter and the Philosopher's Stone, Voldemort consumes unicorn blood to support his partly corporeal form.

=== V ===
- Vampire – A humanoid creature that drinks the blood of humans. A Sasabonsam is a red-haired, white-skinned species of vampire native to Ghana.
- Vampyr Mosp – A fanged moth-wasp hybrid.
- Veela– A being that sometimes resembles an exceptionally beautiful woman, and sometimes resembles a harpy. Veela are known for having the power to bewitch and enchant men.

=== W ===
- Wampus cat – A six-legged puma-like creature.
- Werewolf – A human who transforms into a wolf-like creature during the full moon. The person has no control over the process and cannot choose whether or not it occurs. A Rougarou is a type of werewolf native to the United States and Canada. A Michigan Dogman is a type of werewolf native to Wexford County, Michigan. In the Harry Potter universe, a person becomes a werewolf when they are bitten by another werewolf in wolf-form. Once this happens, the person must learn to manage the condition. The Wolfsbane Potion controls some of the effects of the condition, including allowing the person to maintain their human mind in wolf-form, which prevents them from harming others. Werewolf characters in the Harry Potter series include Remus Lupin and Fenrir Greyback.
- White River Monster – A monstrous fish that dwells in the White River.
- Winged Horse – A horse with wings. Wizards can own them provided they cast a daily Disillusionment Charm on them.
- Wood Nymph – A dryad.
- Wrackspurt – An invisible creature that can enter a person's ear and make them unfocused or confused.

=== Y ===
- Yeti – An ape-like creature native to the Himalayas.
- Yumbo – A white-skinned species of elf native to Senegal.

=== Z ===
- Zombie – An undead creature.
- Zouwu – An elephant-sized cat able to travel long distances.

== See also ==
- Characters in Harry Potter
- Fictional plants in Harry Potter
