= The Magical Worlds of Harry Potter =

Guide book to the fictional universe of Harry Potter

- Cover art of the 2001 edition
- Author: David Colbert
- Genre: Guide to the Harry Potter universe
- Publisher: Lumina Press
- Publication date: March 21, 2001
- Publication place: United States
- Media type: Paperback
- ISBN: 0-9708442-0-4

The Magical Worlds of Harry Potter: A Treasury of Myths, Legends, and Fascinating Facts is a guide to the fictional Harry Potter universe, written by David Colbert. It explores the references to history, legends, and literature in J.K. Rowling's Harry Potter novels. Colbert conceived the idea for The Magical Worlds of Harry Potter while quizzing his nephew and nieces about the mythological references in the novels. He later wrote the book while teaching a seminar on self-publishing to graduate students at the University of North Carolina. The book was published in March 2001, without approval from Rowling, and has since received positive reviews from critics. Updated versions were published to include references to the later novels following their releases, the most recent being in 2007 by Michael O'Mara Books Limited following the release of Harry Potter and the Deathly Hallows.

== Content ==
The Magical Worlds of Harry Potter explores the references to history, legends, and literature in J.K. Rowling's Harry Potter novels. David Colbert, the author of the book, told the St. Louis Post-Dispatch that the Harry Potter novels "are [...] literary treasure hunts for [Rowling's] readers. What seem like funny-sounding names and places and excursions into fantasy all have a basis in either history, myth or legend." He added, however, that he thinks Rowling has been able to turn these elements into her own, and concluded: "A couple of times, every generation, some writer gets it exactly right and really makes it their own, and J.K. Rowling has done that."

The 220-pages-long book features 53 chapters. Colbert writes about the connections between Rowling's novels and folklore, Greek mythology, and the cultures of Ancient Egypt, Ancient Rome, and the Aztec. For example, he explains that Rowling got the name for the character Draco Malfoy from the Latin word for dragon, draco. One of the connections to folklore that Colbert find the most fascinating is the name of the evil wizard family The Malfoys. They are named after the Latin word for "evil-doer", maleficus, which was used in medieval times to describe witches. In addition, there is a chapter in the book that explains the origins of the names of the spells featured in the Harry Potter series.

Colbert explains in the introduction of the book that one of the reasons he enjoys reading Rowling is because of these references that she hides in the novels. He comments that he believes she may have inserted them into the books to encourage readers to learn more about mythology and folklore; "As [Rowling] said when somebody asked her in a chat about the source of one of the unforgivable curses [featured in the books], she said, 'Look it up, a little investigation is good for a person.'"

== Background ==
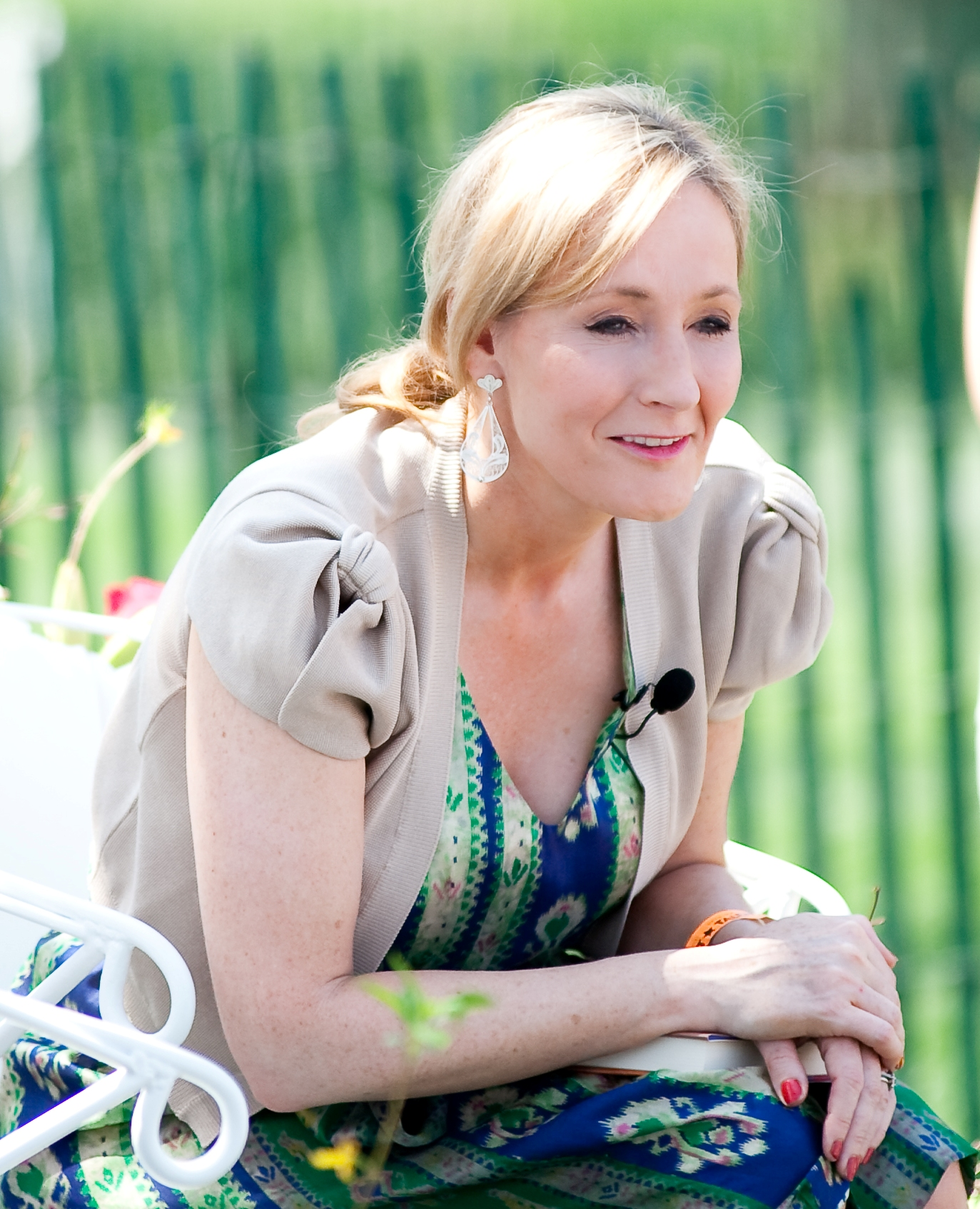
J.K. Rowling, author of the seven Harry Potter novels

Colbert received the idea for The Magical Worlds of Harry Potter during the summer of 2000, when his young nephew and nieces spent their vacation at his home in Wrightsville Beach, North Carolina. During the first half of the children's vacation, Colbert noticed their excitement for the novel Harry Potter and the Goblet of Fire, which was about to be released in bookstores. When his nephew and nieces received the book, they read it for the remainder of their vacation with him.

Colbert, a historian and former head writer on the television quiz show Who Wants to Be a Millionaire?, became interested in the books and bought the first novel in the series, Harry Potter and the Philosopher's Stone, to see what the story was about. As he was reading, he began to notice mythological references in the book. He commented: "I almost laughed out loud when I came across the three-headed dog [Fluffy]. I instantly knew it was a reference to Cerberus, the threeheaded beast which Ancient Greeks believed guarded the gates to the Underworld." Inspired by this, Colbert continued to search the book for more references and noticed that most characters' names are based on their personality and every magic creature is a reference to mythology and folklore.

Excited about his discoveries, Colbert began quizzing his nephew and nieces about the references featured in the books. He started by asking them if they knew who Fluffy was based on, and when revealing that the answer was Cerberus, they "gave him a blank stare". Soon, however, the children thought it was "cool that their hero, Harry, was encountering some of the creatures of mythology." Colbert felt that knowing the origins of Rowling's character and creatures increased "the books' magic tenfold" and made the Harry Potter universe seem more lifelike. Feeling that he wanted to share this with others, Colbert spent a year researching the references in the novels and collected his discoveries for a guidebook to the magical world of Harry Potter.

== Publication and reception ==
Colbert wrote The Magical Worlds of Harry Potter while teaching a seminar on self-publishing to graduate students at the University of North Carolina. He had it self-published in March 2001 and hired a company to take care of accounting, marketing, promotion, and selling. Colbert has never met Rowling and the book has not been approved by her or Warner Brothers (the owner of the film rights to the Harry Potter novels). He was given permission to publish it as long as he noted on the cover that it had not been approved by Rowling.

Colbert does an excellent job at giving insight into Rowling's books. His writing is educational but does not read like a school textbook. For many, such as me, reading about history can be as dreadful as memorizing the dictionary. Luckily, Colbert mixes his lessons with Harry Potter and that, of course, could never be a bore.

— Candice Nguyen, The Oakland Tribune

The book has been met with positive reactions from critics. Margie Thomson of The New Zealand Herald commented that "it's interesting, although light, and should keep smart-alecky kids and the truly curious happy and occupied for some time." The Sacramento Bee's Judy Green was also positive, saying that it "comes across as smart fun just begging for a trivia game. It's a great way to spend time with Harry while waiting for the next novel." The Times' Sarah Johnson said "this irresistibly dippable book gently draws children into the joys of works of reference and is also a glorious tribute to Rowling's work."

Despite the book not having been approved by Rowling, Marti Davis of The Knoxville News-Sentinel suspected that she "would definitely approve of the wonderfully researched book which traces many of the characters, creatures and terms used in Rowling's book to classic literature and ancient history." The Birmingham Post's Jayne Howarth added that the book is "fun to dip in and out of while reading the Potter stories and it illustrates just how clever these pieces of literature are."

The Magical Worlds of Harry Potter has been praised for teaching children about literature and history. Theresa Tighe of the St. Louis Post-Dispatch commented that "grown-ups might like Colbert's book, too, because it painlessly exposes youngsters to Shakespeare, Chaucer, Ovid, Flaubert and more." In addition, Candice Nguyen of The Oakland Tribune said "parents may actually appreciate this book more when they realize that their children are receiving subtle history lessons while they read Harry Potter books and actually enjoying it." The Sunday Tasmanian noted that "understanding the derivatives of language, both made up and actual such as the French, can only enrich the vocabulary of children."

Following the success of The Magical Worlds of Harry Potter, Colbert released the book The Magical Worlds of The Lord of the Rings: The Amazing Myths, Legends and Facts Behind the Masterpiece—a guide to J. R. R. Tolkien's The Lord of the Rings novels—in late 2002. An updated version of The Magical Worlds of Harry Potter was published in 2004 by Berkley Books, just before the film Harry Potter and the Prisoner of Azkaban was released. Colbert wrote and published The Magical Worlds of Narnia in 2005, a guide to the fictional Narnia universe.
