= Cruciate =

Cruciate, and similar words, can mean:

- The cruciate ligaments in the knee
- For a magic spell in the Harry Potter scenario, see crucio
- Latin and early-English word for crusade
