= Magical objects in Harry Potter =

Magical objects make frequent appearances in the Harry Potter novels and film adaptations.

== Deathly Hallows ==
The symbol of the Deathly Hallows represents the three objects: the Elder Wand (line), the Resurrection Stone (circle), and the Invisibility Cloak (triangle).

The Deathly Hallows are three very powerful and magical objects that appear in Harry Potter and the Deathly Hallows and most of the other books in the Harry Potter series. They are the Elder Wand, the Resurrection Stone, and the Cloak of Invisibility. The original owners are Antioch Peverell, Cadmus Peverell, and Ignotus Peverell respectively. According to wizarding legend, they can provide mastery over death if one person owns all three Hallows. The objects are generally remembered only as part of an in-universe fairy tale called "The Tale of the Three Brothers". According to J. K. Rowling, this fictional fairy tale is based on "The Pardoner's Tale" by Geoffrey Chaucer.

In the narrative, Harry Potter eventually comes to possess all three Hallows—the Invisibility Cloak being inherited from his father, James Potter, who is later understood to be a descendant of one of the three brothers from the story, the Resurrection Stone in the Golden Snitch bequeathed to him by Dumbledore, and the allegiance and mastery of the Elder Wand when he defeats and disarms its prior owner, Draco Malfoy, who unwittingly won it from Dumbledore just before Dumbledore's death.

=== The Elder Wand ===
The Elder Wand is described in Deathly Hallows as a legendary and extremely powerful wand made of elder wood with a core of Thestral tail hair. Harry discovers that the Elder Wand's allegiance is transferred when its owner is killed, defeated, or disarmed. Through a series of events, Voldemort comes to possess the Elder Wand, even though Harry is its true master. Unaware of the wand's loyalty to Harry, Voldemort attempts to duel him near the end of the novel. The wand refuses to kill Harry, with the result that Voldemort's curse rebounds on him, and he dies. After Voldemort's death, Harry uses the Elder Wand to repair his own broken wand. He then returns the Elder Wand to Dumbledore's tomb. In Part 2 of the film adaptation of Deathly Hallows, Harry, realizing the wand is too dangerous to fall into the wrong hands, snaps it in two and throws the pieces off a bridge.

J. K. Rowling revealed in an interview that the first working title for Harry Potter and the Deathly Hallows was Harry Potter and the Elder Wand.

=== The Resurrection Stone ===
The book presents the Resurrection Stone as allowing the bearer to communicate with the dead. The stone generates the form of Harry's dead godfather, Sirius Black, who tells Harry that he and the other forms created by the stone are part of him and invisible to others. According to the fairy tale concerning the origin of the Deathly Hallows, using the Resurrection Stone drove its first owner to kill himself because he brought his late fiancée back from the dead, and she was very unhappy in the living world because she did not belong there. By the time the stone was seen in Marvolo Gaunt's possession, it had been set into a ring that bore the symbol of the Deathly Hallows, which the ignorant Gaunt believed to be the Peverell coat of arms; he used the ring to boast about his ancestry and blood purity. Harry said this is the Hallow he would desire most, as like Dumbledore he could name people he would like to communicate with again. Voldemort became aware of the ring's antiquity and eventually used it as a Horcrux, a container for part of his soul, being unaware of the stone's additional magical properties.

Dumbledore is depicted as having recovered the ring from Marvolo's estate, recognizing it as both a Horcrux and one of the Deathly Hallows. Forgetting that as a Horcrux, it was likely to be protected by curses laid by Voldemort, and blinded by personal desire, Dumbledore attempted to use the Resurrection Stone to talk to his deceased family. The curse disfigured his hand and began to spread into his body. Although Snape partly contained the spread in the damaged and blackened hand, Dumbledore was doomed to have, at most, a year left to live.

The stone is later passed to Harry through Dumbledore's will. Harry uses the Stone to summon his deceased loved ones – his parents, his godfather Sirius Black, and Remus Lupin – to comfort him and strengthen his courage, before he goes to meet his death at Voldemort's hand. The stone falls unseen from Harry's fingers in the Forbidden Forest as he reaches Voldemort's encampment. Harry survives the encounter and he and Dumbledore's portrait later agreed that Harry will neither search for the stone nor tell others where it is.

=== The Cloak of Invisibility ===
In the Harry Potter universe, an invisibility cloak is a rare type of cloak used to make the wearer invisible. Rowling's 2001 book Fantastic Beasts and Where to Find Them states that invisibility cloaks may be crafted from Demiguise pelts. Invisibility cloaks can also be ordinary cloaks with a Disillusionment Charm or a Bedazzlement Hex placed on them. Over time, these cloaks will lose their invisibility.

In the novels, Harry owns an invisibility cloak which is later revealed to be a Hallow. Unlike other invisibility cloaks, the Cloak of Invisibility cannot be worn out by time or spells. The Hallow Cloak belonged to Ignotus Peverell and was passed down to his descendant, James Potter. After James's death, Dumbledore gives the Cloak to Harry, who uses it throughout the series to sneak around Hogwarts and other places undetected on various adventures.

== Detectors ==
=== Alastor "Mad-Eye" Moody's Eyeball ===
In the Harry Potter series, Alastor "Mad-Eye" Moody lost his eye and replaced it with an enchanted glass eyeball during the First Wizarding War. With the eyeball, Moody can see through solid objects, invisibility cloaks, and the back of his own head. Following Moody's death in Deathly Hallows, the eyeball ends up in the possession of Dolores Umbridge. When Harry infiltrates the Ministry of Magic, he steals the eyeball from her office and buries it in the forest.

=== Foe-glass ===
A Foe-glass is a mirror that shows the enemies of its owner.

=== The Marauder's Map ===
In the story, the Marauder's Map is a magical map of Hogwarts created by Harry's godfather, Sirius Black, Harry's third year Defense against the Dark Arts professor Remus Lupin, Death Eater Peter Pettigrew, and Harry's biological father, James Potter while they were students at the school. The four marauders nicknames were Moony, Wormtail, Padfoot and Prongs (not respectively). In Prisoner of Azkaban, Fred and George Weasley give the map to Harry so he can travel to Hogsmeade through a hidden passageway. The map is a blank piece of parchment when not in use, but it becomes a detailed layout of Hogwarts when it is activated. It shows the locations of secret passages and instructions on how to access them. It also depicts the location of every individual at Hogwarts in real-time, including their movements. It is opened when the individual says "I solemnly swear that I am up to no good" and closed when the individual says the phrase "mischief managed", which is also the name of the final track in that book's film adaptation.

=== Probity Probe ===
A Probity Probe detects hidden magical objects and concealment spells. Probity Probes are depicted as thin golden rods in Order of the Phoenix. After Voldemort's return, Probes are used to protect Gringotts Bank and to scan Hogwarts students for Dark objects.

=== Remembrall ===
A Remembrall is a small glass orb. It contains smoke that turns red when the person holding it has forgotten something. It does not tell the holder what has been forgotten. Neville Longbottom is sent a Remembrall by his grandmother in Philosopher's Stone.

=== Revealer ===
A Revealer is a bright red eraser, used to make invisible ink appear. It first appears in Chamber of Secrets when Hermione tries to make hidden writing appear in Tom Riddle's diary.

=== Secrecy Sensor ===
A Secrecy Sensor is a Dark detector that looks like "an extra-squiggly, golden television aerial". It vibrates when it detects concealment and lies. In Half-Blood Prince, every student and owl entering Hogwarts is inspected with Secrecy Sensors to ensure no Dark objects enter the school.

=== Sneakoscope ===
In the Harry Potter universe, a Sneakoscope serves as a Dark Arts detector. The device is described as a miniature glass spinning-top that emits shrill noises in the presence of deception, for instance, when an untrustworthy person is near or when a deceitful event takes place nearby.

=== Weasley family clock ===
The Weasleys have a special clock in their home with nine hands, one for every member of the family. Instead of telling the time, the clock reveals the location or status of each family member. The known locations are: Home, School, Work, Travelling, Lost, Hospital, Prison, and Mortal Peril.

In the sixth novel, all nine hands point to mortal peril at all times, except when someone is travelling. Mrs. Weasley takes this to mean that with Voldemort's return, everyone is always in mortal peril, but she cannot verify this as she does not know anyone else who has a clock like hers.

Various fans have re-created the clock for their own families, for example by using geofencing for mobile phones.

== Horcruxes ==
Originally discovered by dark wizard, Herpo "The Foul", a horcrux is an object used to store part of a wizard's soul, which protects them from death. If the body of a Horcrux owner is destroyed, that portion of the soul that had remained in the body does not pass on to the next world, but will rather exist in a non-corporeal form capable of being resurrected by another wizard, as stated in Harry Potter and the Half-Blood Prince and demonstrated in Harry Potter and the Goblet of Fire. If all of someone's Horcruxes are destroyed, then the soul's only anchor in the material world would be the body, the destruction of which would then cause death. The creation of Horcruxes is considered the darkest of all magic.

This method was chosen by Voldemort to attain immortality. J. K. Rowling uses Horace Slughorn's expository dialogue to reveal that the creation of a Horcrux requires one to commit a murder, which, as the supreme act of evil, "rips the soul apart". After the murder, a spell is cast to infuse part of the ripped soul into an object, which then becomes a Horcrux. In the final book of the series, Hermione finds the spell in a book titled Secrets of the Darkest Art. Rowling has revealed that she intends to detail the process and spell used to create a Horcrux in her long-mentioned Harry Potter Encyclopedia.

Both inanimate objects and living organisms have been used as Horcruxes, though the latter are considered riskier to use, since a living being can move and think for itself. There is no limit to the number of Horcruxes a witch or wizard can create. As the creator's soul is divided into progressively smaller portions, they lose more of their natural humanity and the soul becomes increasingly unstable. Consequently, under very specific conditions, a soul fragment can be sealed within an object without the intention or knowledge of the creator. While the object thus affected will, like any Horcrux, preserve the immortality of the creator, it does not become a "Dark object". If a living being becomes a Horcrux it gives a measure of telepathy to both the creator and the Horcrux. For example, Voldemort has unusual control over Nagini, and consequently Nagini is able to communicate with Voldemort about the presence of Harry in Godric's Hollow in Harry Potter and the Deathly Hallows.

Horcruxes made from inanimate objects cannot be destroyed by conventional means such as smashing, breaking, or burning. The Horcrux must suffer enough damage that it cannot be repaired magically. The known materials or objects that can destroy Horcruxes are Basilisk venom, the Sword of Gryffindor (which contains Basilisk venom after Harry uses it to kill a Basilisk), and Fiendfyre, which is a magical flame that cannot be extinguished unless it runs out of fuel.

Voldemort's creation of Horcruxes is central to the later storyline of the Harry Potter novels. Voldemort intended to split his soul into seven pieces, with six Horcruxes and the last piece reposing within his body. When Voldemort attacked the Potter family, and his body was destroyed by the rebounded Killing Curse, a piece of his soul splintered off and attached itself to the only living thing remaining in the room, Harry Potter, in a manner similar to a Horcrux. Voldemort went on to complete his collection of the intended six Horcruxes by turning his snake Nagini into one, thus fragmenting his soul into a total of eight (counting the one residing in his own body), not seven, pieces. By that time, though, unbeknownst to Voldemort himself, the first Horcrux (a diary) had already been destroyed, therefore all seven Horcruxes never existed together at the same point in time.

All of Voldemort's deliberately created Horcruxes were made using objects that had been important to him or that held some symbolic value. He hid some of them carefully so that no one could find and destroy them, but used Nagini to do his bidding on several occasions, and the diary was always intended to be a weapon to carry out Voldemort's plan to remove Muggle-borns from Hogwarts. In Harry Potter and the Half-Blood Prince, the discovery of Voldemort's diary is revealed as the proof that led to Dumbledore beginning the hunt for other Horcruxes, as it not only gave absolute proof that Voldemort split his soul, but also that there were likely other, better-protected artefacts.

J. K. Rowling revealed on Pottermore that Quirinus Quirrell served as a temporary Horcrux when Voldemort's soul possessed his body during Harry's first year at Hogwarts. A notable difference, however, is that the piece of soul within Quirrell was able to exist without its container, as it abandoned Quirrell and left him to die in the underground chambers.

=== Tom Riddle's diary ===
Tom Riddle (later known as Lord Voldemort) created his first Horcrux during his fifth year at Hogwarts, using his own school diary. In order to cast the spell, he murdered his fellow student Myrtle Warren. In Chamber of Secrets, Ginny Weasley becomes possessed by the fragment of Riddle's soul that is encased in the diary, which compels her to open the Chamber of Secrets. At the end of the novel, Harry saves Ginny and destroys the diary by stabbing it with a Basilisk fang.

=== Marvolo Gaunt's ring ===
Within the narrative, Voldemort created his second Horcrux using a ring owned by his grandfather, Marvolo Gaunt. He murdered his father to make this Horcrux, which is later destroyed by Albus Dumbledore, using the sword of Gryffindor. The ring contains the Resurrection Stone, one of the three Deathly Hallows.

=== Slytherin's locket ===
Voldemort created his third Horcrux using a locket that once belonged to his ancestor Salazar Slytherin. The locket had the ability to instruct his heirs where the Chamber of Secrets was located, how to open it, and how to control the basilisk inside. Voldemort murdered a Muggle to make the Horcrux. Albus Dumbledore and Harry obtain the locket in Half-Blood Prince, only to discover that it is fake. Later, Harry and his friends infiltrate the Ministry of Magic and steal the real locket from Dolores Umbridge. Ron then destroys it with the Sword of Gryffindor.

=== Hufflepuff's cup ===
Voldemort created his fourth Horcrux using a cup that once belonged to Helga Hufflepuff. In Harry Potter and the Deathly Hallows, Harry and his friends break into Gringotts Wizarding Bank and steal the cup from the vault of Bellatrix Lestrange. Hermione Granger later destroys the cup in the Chamber of Secrets with a Basilisk fang also from the Chamber of Secrets.

=== Ravenclaw's diadem ===
Rowena Ravenclaw's daughter, Helena, stole her mother's diadem in an attempt to become more intelligent than her. Helena hid the diadem in Albania, where it was eventually found by Voldemort. The Dark Lord turned the diadem into his fifth Horcrux by murdering a peasant, and later sequestered it in the Room of Requirement in Hogwarts. In the novel Deathly Hallows, the diadem is accidentally destroyed by a Fiendfyre spell cast by Vincent Crabbe. In the film adaptation, Harry stabs the diadem with a Basilisk fang before Ron Weasley kicks it into the Fiendfyre.

=== Harry Potter ===
When Voldemort attempted to murder Harry as an infant, he inadvertently sealed a fragment of his soul within him in a manner similar to a Horcrux. Rowling has stated that Harry never became a proper "Dark object" since the Horcrux spell was not cast. Regardless, as with all Horcruxes, Voldemort would remain immortal so long as his soul fragment remained within Harry. That portion of Voldemort's soul is unintentionally destroyed by Voldemort himself when Harry allows Voldemort to use the killing curse upon him near the end of Deathly Hallows.

As a baby, Harry was in the room when Voldemort's fatal Killing Curse backfired. Voldemort's soul had been weakened and destabilised by his continuous murders and the creation of his previous Horcruxes. Harry became a Horcrux when a fragment of Voldemort's soul attached itself to him after the unsuccessful curse. The lightning bolt-shaped scar on Harry's forehead is a direct result of this attempted murder, and the connection that formed as a result is used to explain several important plot points. Throughout the series, Harry is able to receive insight into Voldemort's mental and emotional states, allowing the reader to eavesdrop on the series' primary antagonist. This insight is usually accompanied by pain in the scar on Harry's forehead. Through Voldemort, Harry also inherited many of Voldemort's powers and the ability to speak and understand Parseltongue. It is also revealed by Rowling in an interview that Harry's frequent pain in his scar when Voldemort is either active, nearby, or feeling strong emotions, is really the trapped bit of soul yearning to depart from Harry's body and rejoin its master's soul.

The Killing Curse used by Voldemort on Harry in the Forbidden Forest destroys the fragment of Voldemort's soul within Harry, but only sends Harry's soul into a near-death state. Harry could return to his body despite being hit by the Killing Curse from the Elder Wand because Voldemort had used Harry's blood to regain his full strength in Harry Potter and the Goblet of Fire, and because the actual master of the Elder Wand, Draco Malfoy, had been defeated by Harry, making Harry the new master of the Elder Wand. Harry's ownership of the wand used for the curse and the Horcrux-like connection between Voldemort and Harry diminished Voldemort's curse and protected Harry from irreversible death.

While Voldemort did learn of Harry's telepathic connection, Voldemort was never aware that Harry was inadvertently carrying a fragment of his soul. With this destroyed, the connections between the two were also broken, and Harry never again felt pain in his scar. Rowling revealed Harry has also lost the ability to speak Parseltongue, though he regained the ability to understand it in Harry Potter and the Cursed Child after his scar began to hurt again following the rise of Voldemort and Bellatrix's daughter Delphi whom Harry, his son Albus, and his allies defeated and sent to Azkaban. In the epilogue of the last film, the scar has faded to an ordinary-looking scar on Harry's forehead.

=== Nagini ===
It is revealed in the story that the sixth Horcrux is Nagini, the snake Voldemort had with him constantly. This Horcrux was created while Voldemort was hiding in the forests of Albania; he used Nagini to kill, thus turning her into a Horcrux. In the last chapter of Deathly Hallows, Nagini is killed by Neville Longbottom using the sword of Godric Gryffindor. The destruction of the last remaining Horcrux made Voldemort mortal.

== Legendary magical artefacts ==
=== Goblet of Fire ===
The Goblet of Fire is an artefact used at the beginning of every Triwizard Tournament. Each student who is of-age and wishes to compete places a piece of parchment with their name on it into the Goblet. At the designated time, the Goblet selects one champion from each of the three schools in competition.

=== Sword of Gryffindor ===
The Sword of Gryffindor is a goblin-crafted sword. It was once owned by Godric Gryffindor, and can magically present itself to any Gryffindor student who needs it. During the course of the novel series, the sword is used to kill a Basilisk and destroy three of Voldemort's Horcruxes.

=== Philosopher's Stone ===
Based upon the ancient alchemical idea of the philosopher's stone, the stone is owned by Nicolas Flamel and first mentioned in Harry Potter and the Philosopher's Stone. The stone is legendary in that it changes all metals to gold, and can be used to brew a potion called the Elixir of Life, making the drinker immortal. The Philosopher's Stone is seen only in the first and last book, although it is referenced several times throughout the series. It was destroyed at the end of the first book by Dumbledore with Flamel's agreement.

In the American version, this stone is called the Sorcerer's Stone.

=== Sorting Hat ===
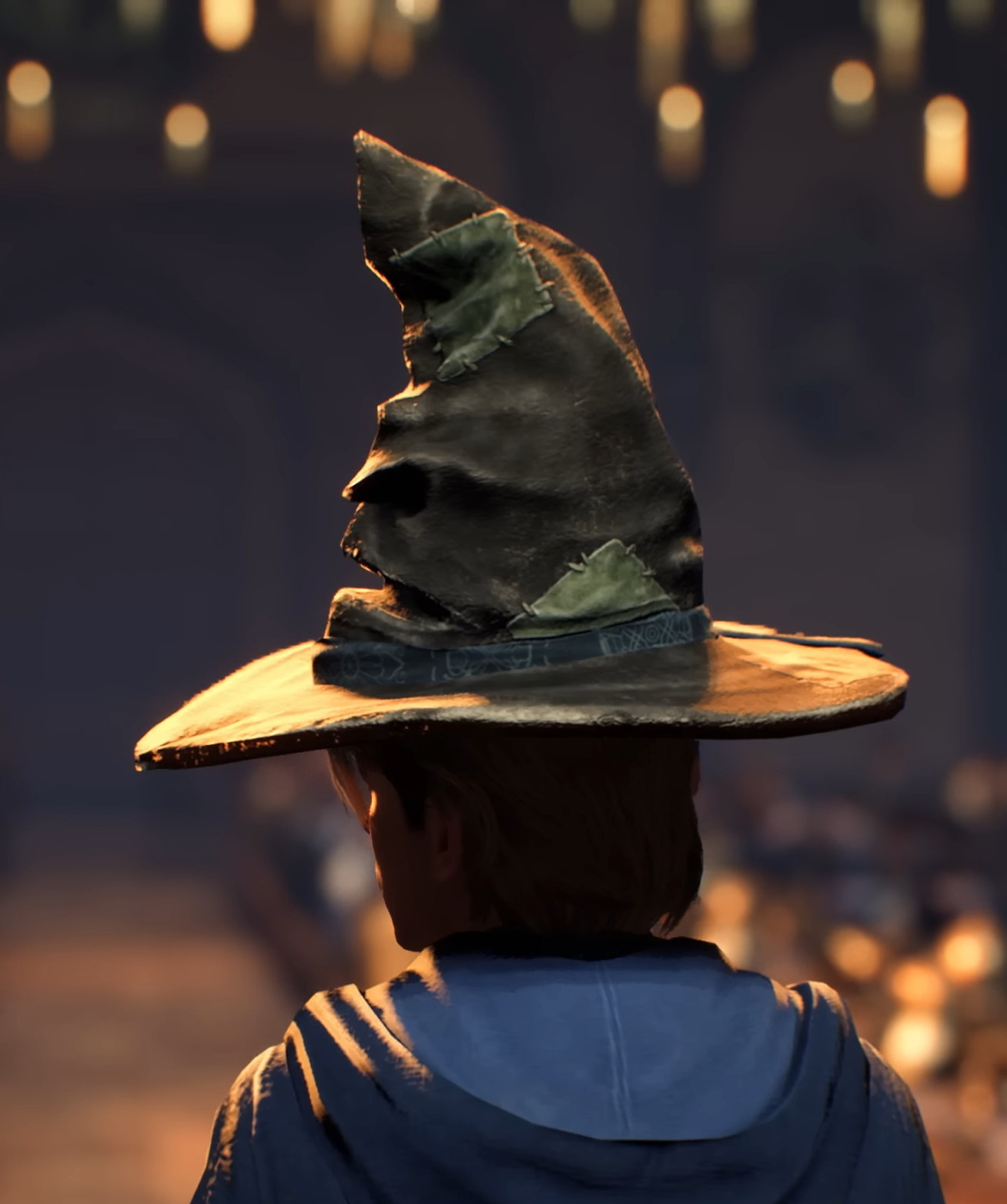
The mind-scanning sorting hat in the Hogwarts Legacy video game

The Sorting Hat is an artefact used to sort Hogwarts students into houses. At the beginning of each school year, the Hat is placed on each first-year student's head. The Hat announces whether the student will be assigned to Gryffindor, Hufflepuff, Ravenclaw or Slytherin. In the Harry Potter films, the Sorting Hat is voiced by Leslie Phillips. David Threlfall

== Mirrors ==
=== The Mirror of Erised ===
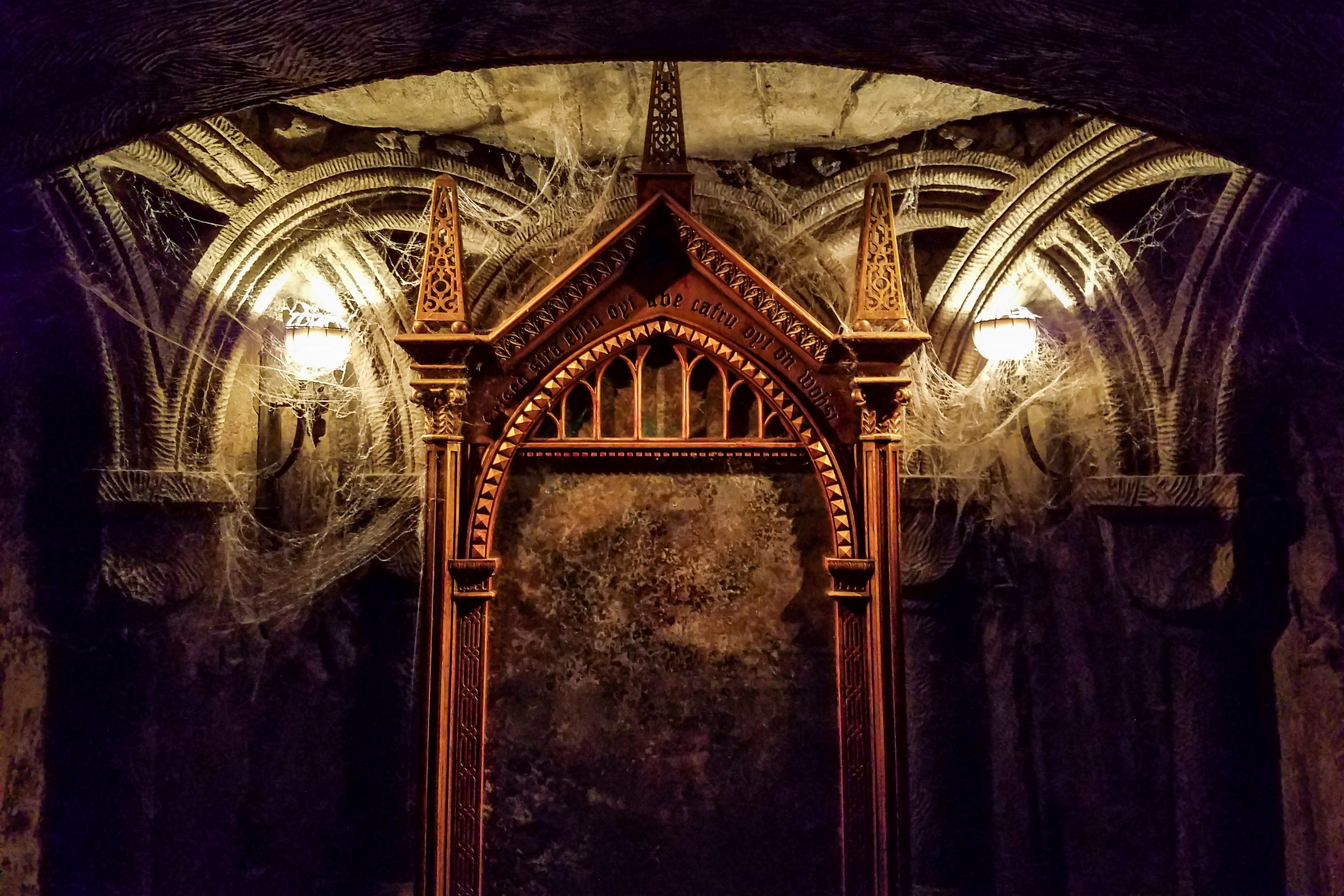
Mirror at the Wizarding World of Harry Potter, Universal Studios Hollywood

The Mirror of Erised is a mystical mirror discovered by Harry in an abandoned classroom in Philosopher's Stone. On it is inscribed "erised stra ehru oyt ube cafru oyt on wohsi". When mirrored and correctly spaced, this reads "I show not your face but your heart's desire". As "erised" reversed is "desire", it is the "Mirror of Desire". Harry, upon encountering the Mirror, can see his parents, as well as what appears to be a crowd of relatives. The last thing Harry saw in the mirror was Voldemort defeated.

Dumbledore cautions Harry that the Mirror gives neither knowledge nor truth, merely showing the viewer's deepest desire, and that men have wasted their lives away before it, entranced by what they see.

The Mirror of Erised was the final protection given to the Philosopher's Stone in the first book. Dumbledore hid the Mirror and hid the Stone inside it, knowing that only a person who wanted to find but not use the Stone would be able to obtain it. Anyone else would see themselves making an Elixir of Life or turning things to gold, rather than actually finding the Stone, and would be unable to obtain it. What happens to the mirror afterwards is unknown.

=== Two-way mirrors ===
In Order of the Phoenix, Sirius gives Harry a mirror he originally used to communicate with James while they were in separate detentions. That mirror is a part of a set of two-way mirrors that are activated by holding one of them and saying the name of the other possessor, causing his or her face to appear on the caller's mirror and vice versa. Harry receives this mirror from Sirius in a package after spending his Christmas holiday at Grimmauld Place. Harry, at first, chooses not to open the package, although he does discover the mirror after Sirius's death, by which point it is no longer functional. It makes its second appearance in Deathly Hallows when Mundungus Fletcher loots Grimmauld Place and sells Sirius's mirror to Aberforth Dumbledore, who uses it to watch out for Harry in Deathly Hallows. When Harry desperately cries for help to a shard of the magical mirror (which broke in the bottom of his trunk), a brilliant blue eye belonging to Aberforth (which Harry mistakes for Albus's eye), appears and he sends Dobby, who arrives to help Harry escape from Malfoy Manor to Shell Cottage.

== Prank objects ==
=== Weasleys' Wizard Wheezes ===
According to the plot of the novels, Prank objects from Weasleys' Wizard Wheezes are made and designed by the owners of the shop, Fred and George, who test their new creations on themselves and other Hogwarts students.

- Patented Daydream Charms are kits that put the user into a "highly realistic 30-minute daydream".
- A Headless Hat creates a limited field of invisibility that covers the wearer's head, giving them the appearance of not having a head. Its counterpart is a Shield Hat, which deflects minor hexes and curses.
- Trick Wands are magical fake wands that turn into a silly item (rubber chickens, tin parrots, etc.) when someone tries to use them.
- Extendable Ears are long flesh-coloured strings, one end of which is inserted into a user's ear and the other end placed further away towards a conversation or sound. Much like a listening device, the user will be able to hear the sounds as if they were much closer to the source.
- Portable Swamps are, as the name suggests, realistic pop-up swamps. They are first seen in Order of the Phoenix after Umbridge is named Headmistress. Fred and George set one off in a corridor, in part to distract Umbridge so Harry can use her fireplace. Umbridge is unable to remove the swamp and forces Filch to punt students across; Professor Flitwick vanishes it almost instantly later in the novel.
- Decoy Detonators are described as black horn type objects that will run out of sight, and make a noise giving the user a good distraction.

There are also prank items which the Weasleys import from elsewhere, such as:

- Peruvian Instant Darkness Powder, which throws an area into darkness that cannot be penetrated by wand light or any magical means, although the effect wears off in a few minutes.

=== Other prank objects ===
Other prank objects include Belch Powder, Dungbombs (which explode and cause a large and extremely smelly mess), and Ever-Bashing Boomerangs (which hit their target repeatedly after being thrown). Fanged Frisbees are quite literally normal Frisbees with fangs and are first mentioned in Goblet of Fire as one of Filch's newest restricted items during Dumbledore's start-of-term speech.

== Storage receptacles ==
=== Moody's Magical Trunk ===
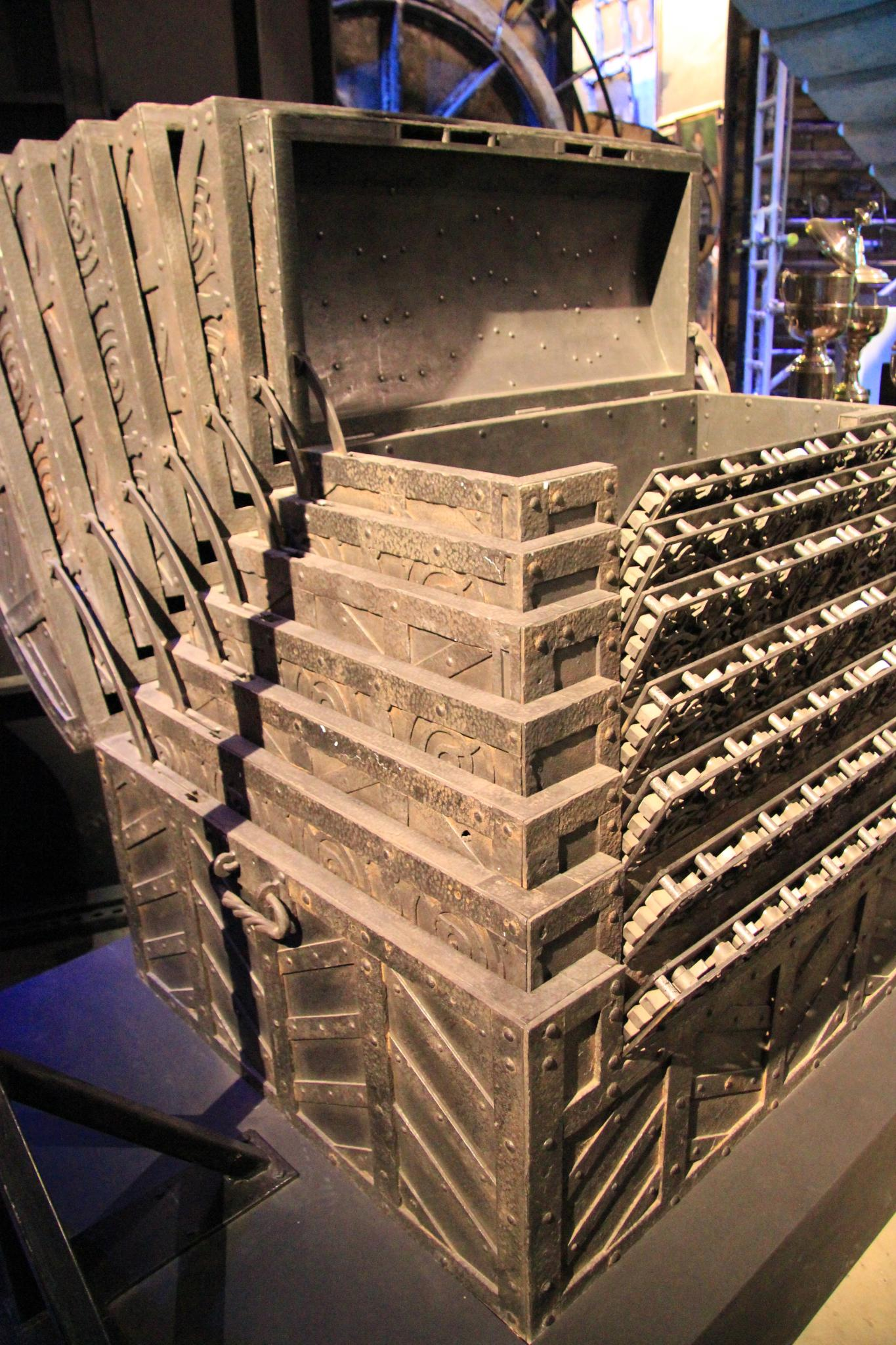
Moody's Magical Trunk

Alastor Moody is depicted as owning a strangely bewitched magical trunk. It has seven locks on it, and the trunk opens to a different assortment of objects for each lock. Most notably, though, the seventh compartment is about 10 feet (3 m) deep (possibly because of the use of an Undetectable Extension Charm), and is where Barty Crouch Jr. imprisoned the real Moody. Other compartments contain spellbooks, Dark Detectors, and Moody's invisibility cloak.

=== Pensieve ===
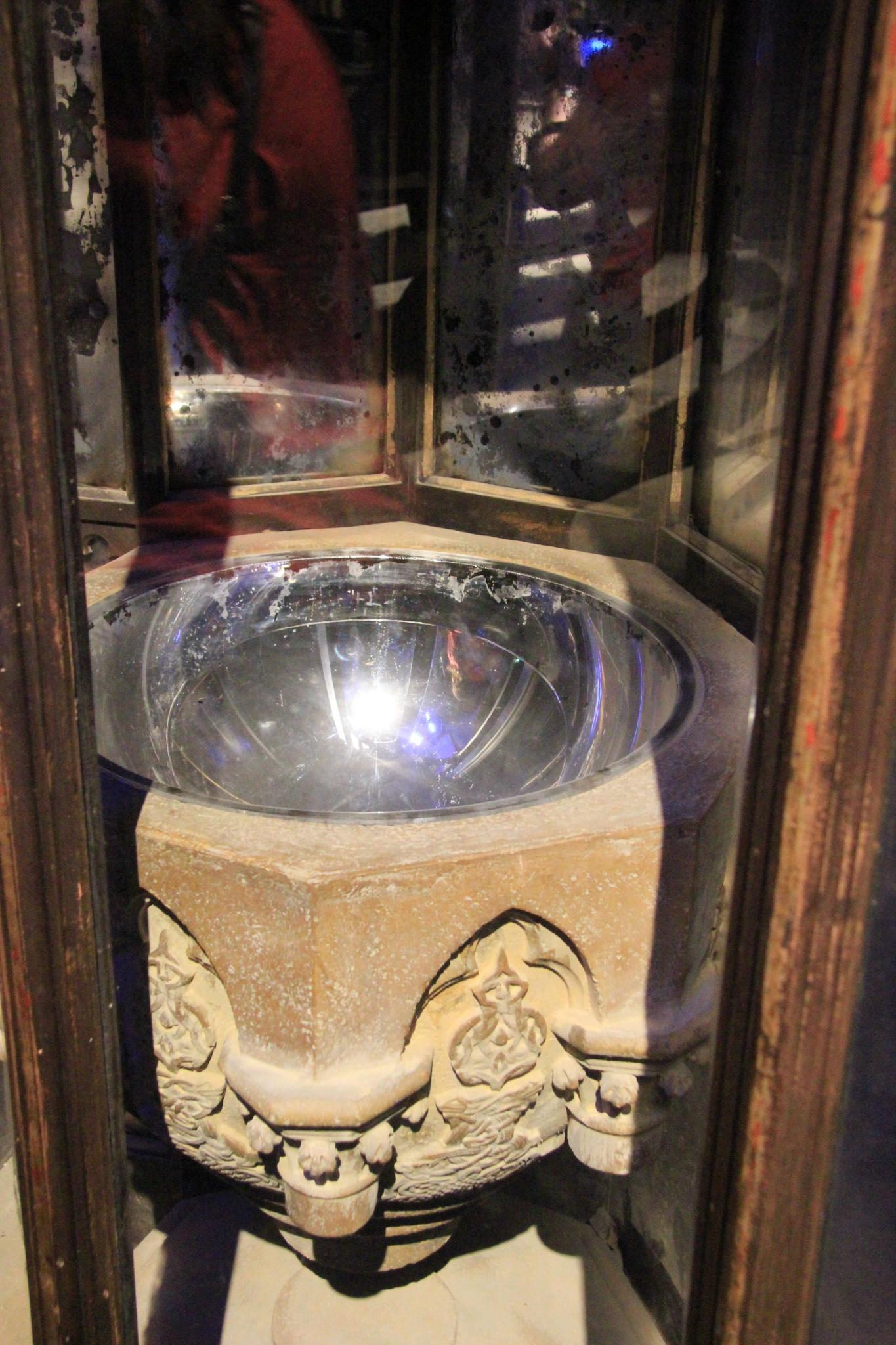
Pensieve stone basin

According to Rowling, the Pensieve is a stone basin used to review memories. Covered in mystic runes, it contains memories whose physical form is neither gas nor liquid. A witch or wizard can extract their own or another's memories, store them in the Pensieve, and review them later. It also relieves the mind when it becomes cluttered with information. Anyone can examine the memories in the Pensieve, which also allows viewers to fully immerse themselves in the memories stored within, much like a magical form of virtual reality.

Users of these devices view the memories from a third-person-point-of-view, providing a near-omniscient perspective of the events preserved. J. K. Rowling confirmed memories in the Pensieve allow one to view details of things that happened even if they did not notice or remember themselves, and stated "that's the magic of the Pensieve, what brings it alive". The memories contained in the Pensieve have the appearance of silver threads. Memories that have deteriorated due to age, or that were heavily manipulated or tampered with to alter perspectives (such as Slughorn's), may appear thick and jelly-like and offer obscured viewing. Memories are not limited to just those of humans, since Hokey the house-elf provided Dumbledore with a memory as well. It makes its last appearance in Deathly Hallows when Harry uses it to uncover the truth about Snape.

In the fourth film, the Pensieve in Dumbledore's office conforms to the description given in the novel. However, in the sixth and eighth films, it appears as a shallow metal dish, floating in midair and filled with a mercury-like liquid. During the eighth film, Harry removes it from the stone basin so he can use it to examine Snape's memories.

== Transportation ==
=== Arthur Weasley's Flying Ford Anglia ===
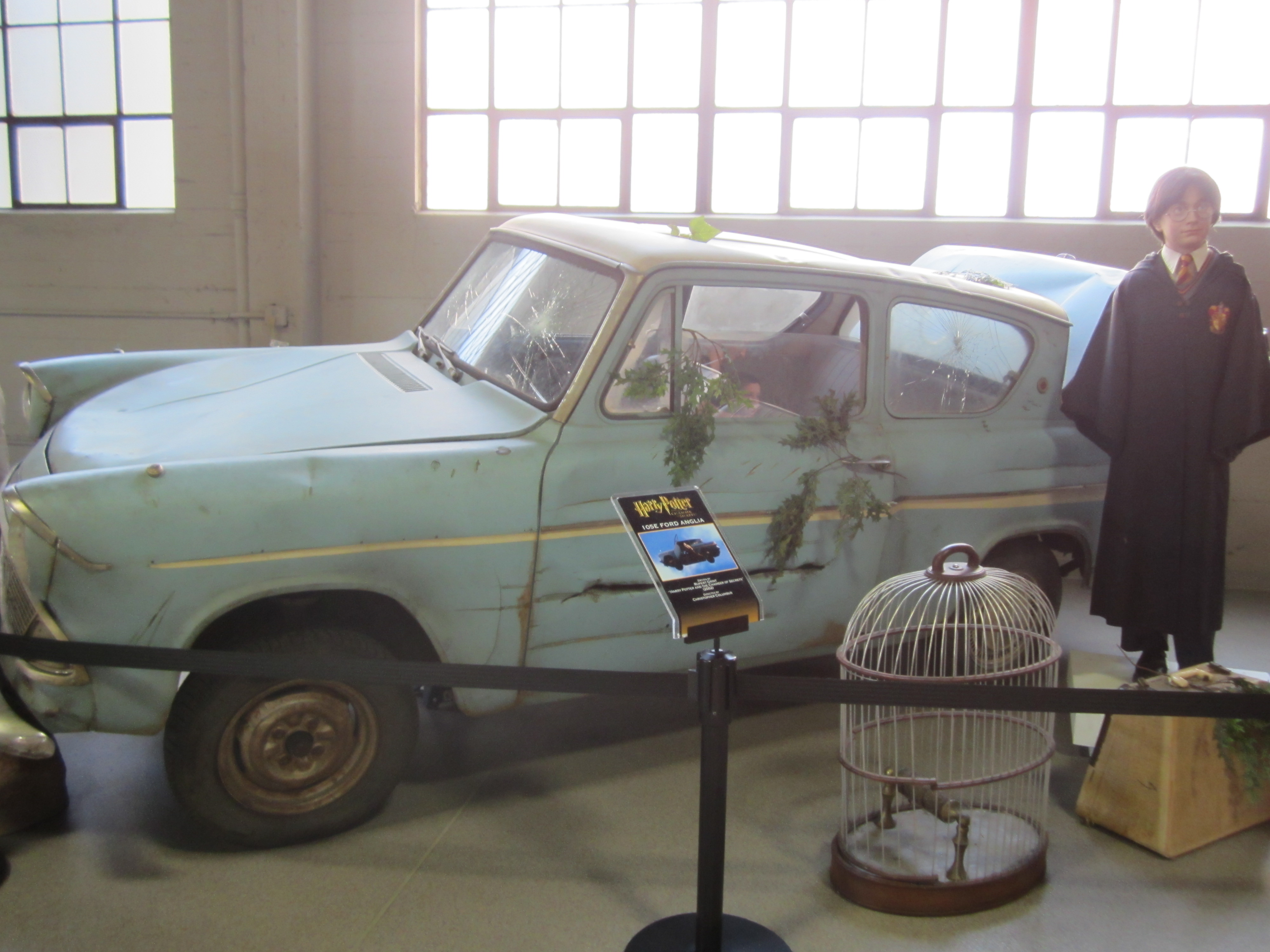
One of the Ford Anglia 105E cars that appears in the films

The book describes Arthur Weasley as the owner of a 1960 Ford Anglia 105E, which he subsequently enchanted; consequently, the vehicle can fly, become invisible, and carry the entire Weasley family in spite of its formerly non-enchanted interior dimensions (also the Undetectable Extension Charm), among other abilities. The enchantment placed on the car also made it semi-sentient.

The 1962 Ford Anglia used in the film was acquired by Rupert Grint, who plays Ron Weasley, and is currently displayed in the National Motor Museum, Beaulieu. A total of 14 Ford Anglias were destroyed during the filming of the scene where the car crashes into the Whomping Willow.

A replica of the car in its feral state could be seen in the queue line for the now-defunct Dragon Challenge roller coaster at the Universal Studios Islands of Adventure theme park. Occasionally it blinked its headlights and honked its horn when its motion detectors sensed that guests were standing in front of it or walking by it. The replica has been integrated into Hagrid's Magical Creatures Motorbike Adventure and can be seen sitting atop a large rock formation with its windshield wipers and headlights running while under the control of Cornish Pixies. It can also be heard blaring its horn as riders pass beneath the arch. The car appears in the Hogwarts Express attraction where it can be seen flying alongside the train before crashing in the Forbidden Forest.

=== Broomsticks ===
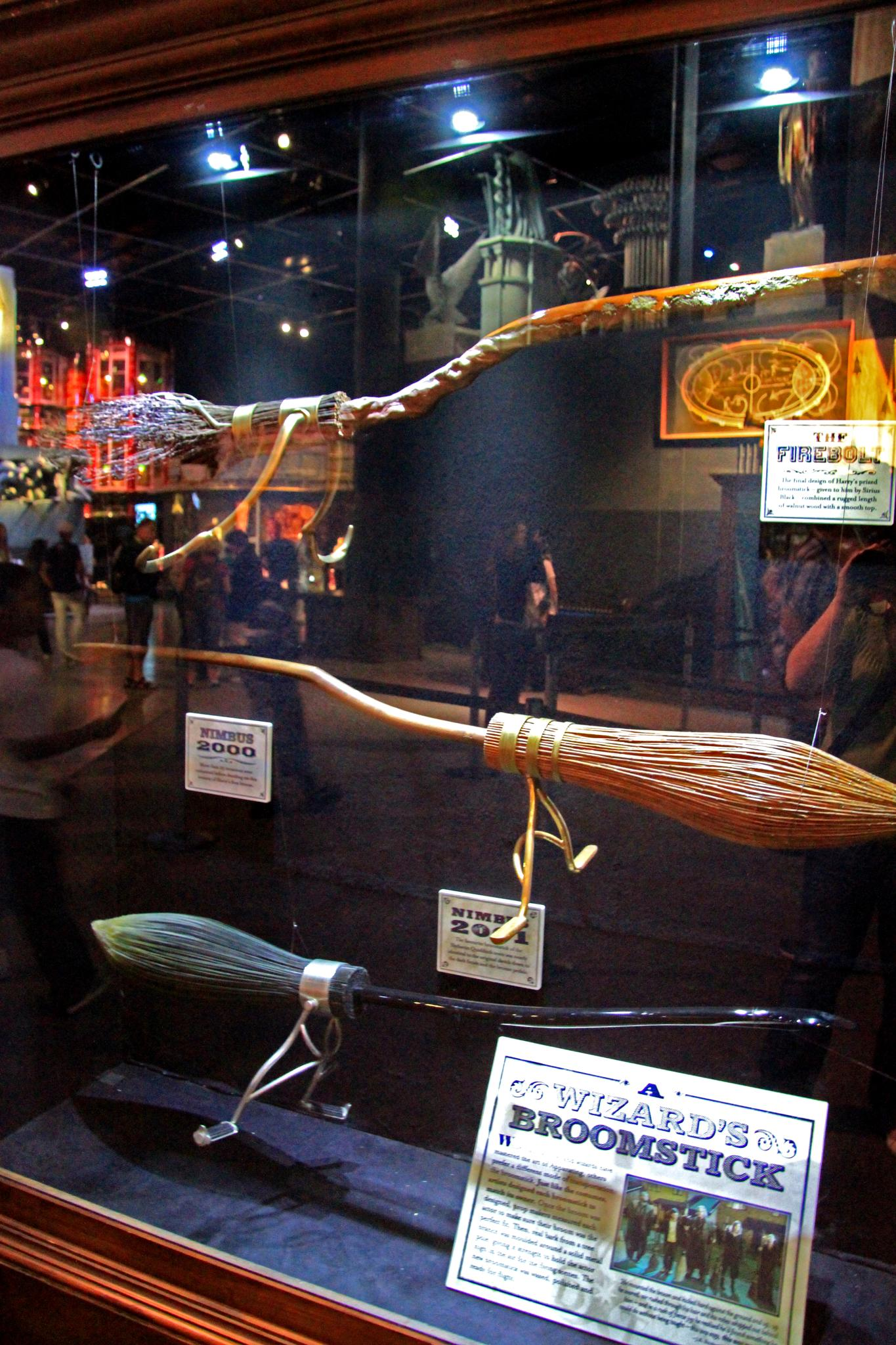
Broomsticks displayed at the Warner Bros. Studio Tour London: The Making of Harry Potter

Broomsticks are used for transportation by witches and wizards of all ages, and for participating in the game of Quidditch in the Harry Potter universe. Their use is similar to that of flying carpets, although the latter are banned in Great Britain by the Ministry of Magic. However, they are uncomfortable for extended trips, even with a cushion charm applied, and thus many wizards favour other means of transport for those journeys.

Broomsticks are treated as a major consumer product in the wizarding world. There are numerous manufacturers and models of brooms, including Cleansweeps and Comets, all of which vary in their capabilities. These range from expensive high-performance models to toy broomsticks for young children that fly only a few feet off the ground to family-sized broomsticks that seat multiple people and include a luggage compartment below the seating area.

Since Harry plays Quidditch, his broomsticks - a Nimbus 2000 and later a Firebolt - are prominent in the series. The Nimbus 2000 was given to him by special consent of Dumbledore via Minerva McGonagall, who had chosen him as the Gryffindor Seeker. The Firebolt was given to him by his godfather Sirius Black as a Christmas gift after his Nimbus was destroyed by the Whomping Willow tree during a Quidditch match. The Firebolt remains the fastest broom in the world, having surpassed the previous record holder, the Nimbus 2001 (which Draco Malfoy owns and which his father Lucius Malfoy had given as gifts to the entire Slytherin team as a bribe to have Draco as their Seeker). The price of the Firebolt is so high it is only available upon request.

=== Floo Powder ===
Floo Powder as seen in the film adaptation of Harry Potter and the Chamber of Secrets

In the Sorcerer's Stone, Floo Powder is a glittering powder used by wizards to travel between fireplaces that are connected to the Floo Network. The traveler throws a handful of Floo powder into the flames, then steps into the fireplace and states their intended destination. Floo powder can also be used for communication; a wizard can kneel in front of the fireplace and stick their head into the fire, which will then appear in the fire of the destination fireplace, leaving the witch or wizard free to talk. It is also known that other body parts may be transported via Floo Powder, as Umbridge almost catches Sirius the second time he converses with Harry through the Floo network. Voices can also be transmitted through the Floo Network, as seen in the Prisoner of Azkaban by Snape, who summons Lupin through his office's fireplace while interrogating Harry about the Marauder's Map.

The Floo Network is controlled by the Ministry of Magic. The Ministry also has over 700 fireplaces in its headquarters so that officials and workers can go directly to/from work without the hustle and bustle of travelling on brooms or by Portkey - or the indignity of having to flush themselves in through a public toilet, as portrayed in Deathly Hallows.

According to Pottermore, the only licensed producer of Floo Powder in Britain is Floo-Pow, a company whose Headquarters is located in Diagon Alley. No shortage of Floo Powder has ever been reported, nor does anybody know anyone who makes it. Its price has remained constant for one hundred years: two Sickles a scoop.

=== Hogwarts Express ===
The Hogwarts Express is described as a steam train which transports Hogwarts students to and from the school. It is stationed in Hogsmeade when not in use, and can be accessed only by using the magical barrier between platforms 9 and 10 at King's Cross train station (known as " Platform 9¾") in London.

=== Knight Bus ===
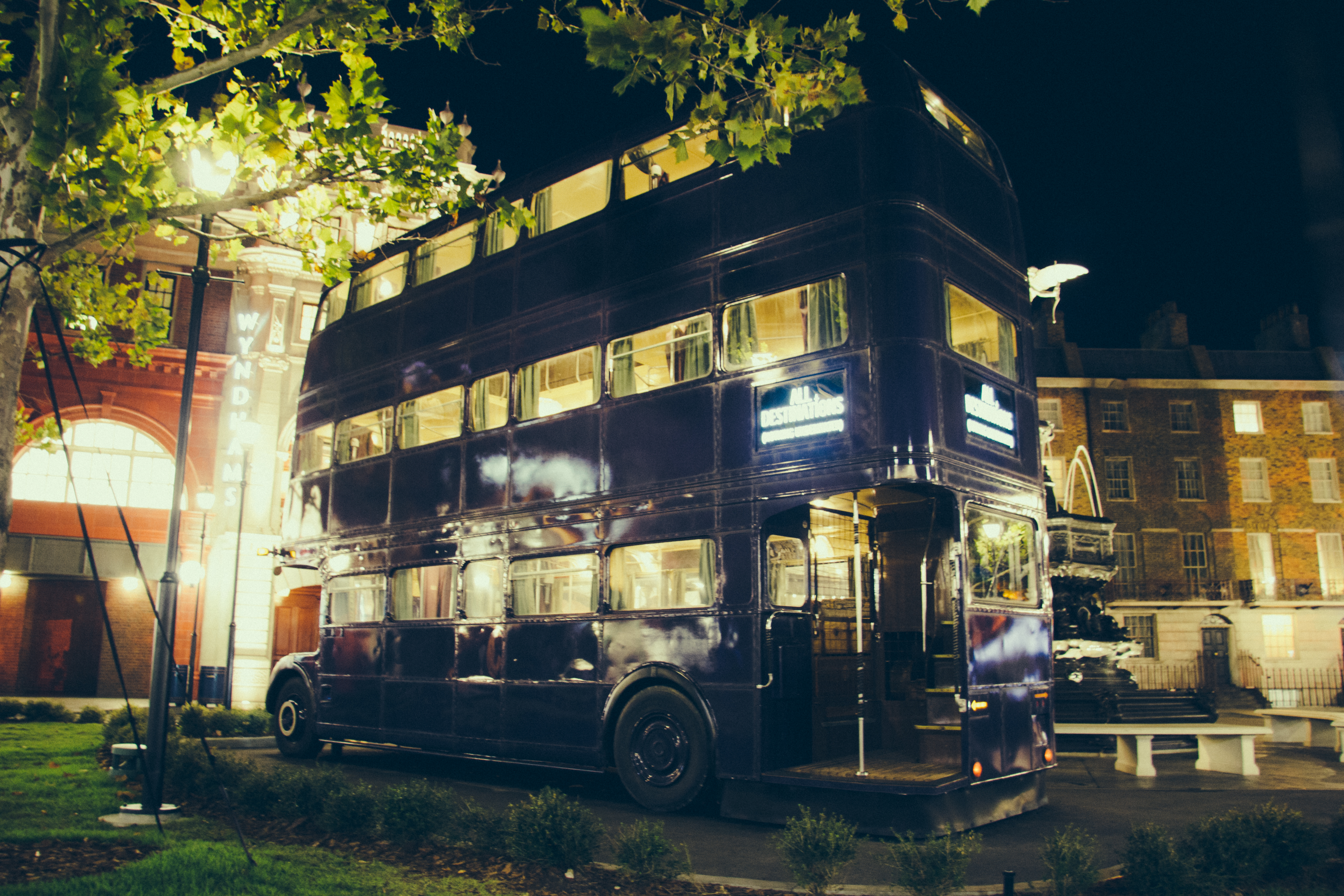
The Knight Bus, seen in the Harry Potter and the Prisoner of Azkaban film, at Universal Studios Florida.

The Knight Bus is an enchanted bus that transports wizards. It makes its first appearance in Prisoner of Azkaban when Harry unintentionally summons it. The Knight Bus is faster than travelling by broomstick, but not as fast as near-instantaneous Floo Powder and apparating.

The bus functions as a convenient form of public transportation for wizards and witches who either prefer to use it or are unable to travel by other means. It bolts through the streets entirely invisible to Muggles and causes other objects to dodge it (instead of the other way around) for short distance-travel. For longer distances, the Knight Bus instantly leaps 100 miles (160 km) at a time, accompanied by a great bang and jolt.

The conductor of the Knight Bus is Stan Shunpike, and its driver is Ernie Prang. In the third film, Ernie is accompanied by a talking shrunken head voiced by Lenny Henry.

The actual Knight Bus seen in the film adaptation was built by grafting the top deck of a London AEC Regent III RT bus onto the top of another "RT" bus. Both buses were originally built for London Transport. A replica of the Knight Bus sits in front of the London facade at The Wizarding World of Harry Potter in Universal Studios Florida, serving as a stage for a small audience-interactive show with a Stan Shunpike look-alike and a shrunken head.

=== Portkeys ===
Portkeys are first introduced in Goblet of Fire. They are an alternative to Apparation but can also be used to transport a group of people at once. Created by using the Portus spell, a Portkey can be set to transport anybody who touches it to a designated location or to become active at a predetermined time and transport itself and anyone touching it to its set destination. It may be created for one-way, one-time use or to transport the holder to and from a particular place in a round trip; in addition, it may be set to activate at a particular time or automatically transport the first person who touches it. The creation of Portkeys is highly restricted and controlled by the Ministry.

Any object can be used as a Portkey. As a safety measure to discourage unsuspecting Muggles from picking them up and activating them, wizards are advised to use old, worthless items. Portkey objects used in the novels include a football and an old boot.

=== Rubeus Hagrid's Enchanted Motorbike ===
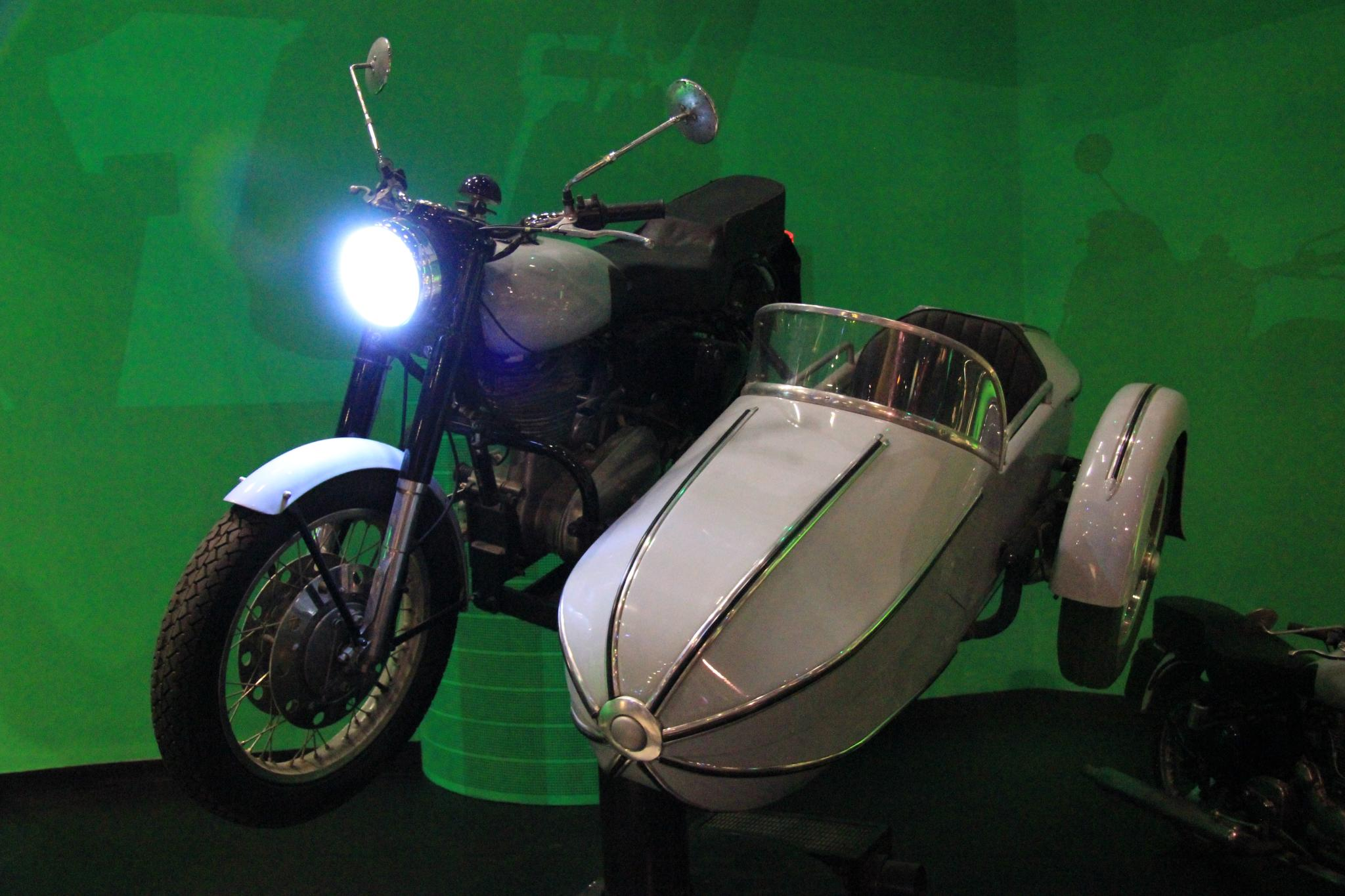
Sirius Black's motorbike

In the story, Sirius Black is described as having owned a flying motorbike, which he lent to Hagrid the night Harry's parents died. It is first seen when Hagrid delivers the baby Harry to Number 4, Privet Drive in the first book, and then again when Hagrid uses it to transport Harry to a safe house in the seventh volume. In Deathly Hallows, various modifications have been made to the bike by Mr. Weasley, allowing it to create a brick wall or a net that erupts from the exhaust pipe and to shoot dragon fire from the exhaust, impelling the bike's sudden acceleration. The dragon-fire feature is used to great effect by Hagrid and Harry when being chased by Voldemort; however, Mr. Weasley did warn that he was unsure of its safety and that they should use it only in an emergency. He was right to say this, as the sidecar of the motorbike, unaffected by Hagrid's magic, dislodged after the abrupt acceleration.

=== Time-Turner ===
A Time-Turner may be used for short-term time travel. Hermione receives a Time-Turner from McGonagall in Prisoner of Azkaban, enabling her to attend more than one class simultaneously. Hermione is ordered to keep it a secret from everyone, including Harry and Ron, although they notice the suspicious impossibility of her schedule and several bizarre disappearances and reappearances. Hermione reveals the secret to Harry and Ron near the end of the book, when she and Harry use the Time-Turner to save Sirius Black and Buckbeak. Strained by her heavy course load, she returns the device to McGonagall at the end of the novel. Hermione's Time-Turner resembles a gold hourglass pendant on a necklace.

Time-Turners are a significant point device in Cursed Child, where it is revealed that a principle known as Croaker's Law restricts all legal Time-Turners to travelling a maximum of five hours into the past. It is widely rumoured that Draco Malfoy's son Scorpius is the son of Lord Voldemort and that Scorpius's mother used a Time-Turner to make this possible. An illegal Time-Turner capable of travelling back years is confiscated from a Dark wizard by the Ministry of Magic (although official word remains that all Time-Turners are destroyed) and is later stolen by Albus Potter and Scorpius Malfoy, who intend to travel back in time to prevent the death of Cedric Diggory. Unfortunately, they quickly discover the Time-Turner is a cheaply made prototype that only takes them back for five minutes before forcibly returning them to the present. After accidentally creating (and then undoing) an alternate reality where Voldemort survived and took over the world, Albus and Scorpius resolve to destroy the Time-Turner, but are forced into another time trip by the story's villain and are left trapped in the past when the Time-Turner is destroyed. Back in the present, Draco reveals he possesses a professionally made Time-Turner (bound by neither Croaker's Law nor the five-minute flaw) - he never admitted its existence for fear it would lend credence to the rumours surrounding his son and never used it (despite being tempted by the possibility of seeing his dead wife alive again). When Albus and Scorpius are able to send a message to their parents, Draco's Time-Turner is used to rescue the boys.

=== Vanishing Cabinet ===
Two Vanishing Cabinets play a role in the novels, separately stored at Borgin and Burkes and in the Room of Requirement at Hogwarts. When they are in good working order and used properly, a person who steps into either cabinet will instantly emerge from the other.

The Vanishing Cabinet is first seen in Chamber of Secrets when Harry hides in it to elude the Malfoys after accidentally travelling to Borgin and Burkes via the Floo Network; its transportation features are not activated as he does not shut its door completely. Its Hogwarts counterpart is also mentioned in Chamber of Secrets when Nearly Headless Nick persuades Peeves the Poltergeist to drop it (thus breaking it) over Filch's office in order to help Harry escape detention for tracking in mud. It is also used in Order of the Phoenix by Fred and George Weasley when they force Montague, the Slytherin Quidditch captain and a member of Dolores Umbridge's Inquisitorial Squad, into it after he tries to take house points from Gryffindor. Montague is found several days later, jammed in a toilet and badly disoriented. In Half-Blood Prince, Draco Malfoy learns of his experience, determines that the cabinet is linked to the one still at Borgin & Burkes, and repairs it to allow Death Eaters access to Hogwarts.

Though this set is the only one mentioned in the book series, the film version of Half-Blood Prince reveals that they were popular when Voldemort first came to power, as they would allow people to make a quick getaway from Voldemort and his Death Eaters in an emergency.

== Writing equipment ==
=== Anti-Cheating Quill ===
The Anti-Cheating Quill, a quill with an anti-cheating charm on it, is first mentioned in Philosopher's Stone. In book five they are assigned to every O.W.L. student to prevent them from cheating on their written exams. It is made by George and Fred Weasley.

=== Auto-Answer Quill ===
In the novel, the Auto-Answer Quill is a quill that has been bewitched so that when the quill touches a question on a piece of parchment it writes the answer instantly. The quill is banned from the O.W.L. Examinations and the inks are checked out every time the test is on.

=== Blood Quill ===
The Blood Quill is a torture quill used by Umbridge throughout the Order of the Phoenix to punish students whom she has given detention. It is described as having an unusually sharp black nib. As the user writes, the quill magically and very painfully cuts into the back of the user's hand and uses his or her blood for ink. In the fifth book, Harry has detention with Umbridge on several occasions; he is required to write lines (I must not tell lies) and is not released from this until Umbridge believes "the message has sunk in". When carried out repeatedly over an extended period, this leads to permanent scarring, as Harry shows Scrimgeour in the last two books. The scars tingle whenever Harry hears Umbridge's name, but it is not clear whether this is psychological or akin to Harry's forehead scar hurting whenever Voldemort is active. Another victim of this form of detention is Lee Jordan; in the film adaptation of the book, members of Dumbledore's Army are forced to use these quills as well. Blood quills are considered illegal to own.

=== The Quill of Acceptance ===
According to Pottermore, the Quill of Acceptance is a magical object which detects the birth of a child with magical capabilities. It is located in Hogwarts School, where it records the children's names in a large book. Professor McGonagall consults the book and sends out the subsequent Hogwarts acceptance letters by owl once the child turns eleven. It has been made very popular due to its use in registering users for the closed beta of Pottermore.

=== Quick Quotes Quill ===
A Quick Quotes Quill is described as a stenographic tool, acid green in colour, employed by Rita Skeeter to spin the words of her subjects into a more salacious or melodramatic form. In Harry Potter and the Goblet of Fire, Skeeter uses the quill to interview Harry about his participation in the Triwizard Tournament for her column in The Daily Prophet. Harry continually tries to alert her to the inaccuracy of the quill; however, she continually ignores him. Additionally, in Deathly Hallows, Rita mentions in her Daily Prophet interview concerning her posthumous biography of Dumbledore that her Quick Quotes Quill helped her to write the book so quickly after his death.

=== Spell-Checking Quill ===
In the story, the Spell-Checking Quill temporarily corrects spelling as the user writes; however, once the charm wears off it constantly misspells words, even if the user writes them correctly. The most notable example is its misspelling of Ron's name as "Roonil Wazlib" in Half-Blood Prince. It is sold through Weasley's Wizard Wheezes, the joke shop opened by Fred and George Weasley.

== Other objects ==
=== Deluminator ===
A Deluminator is a device invented by Albus Dumbledore that can remove light from any light source. It can also return the removed light to its source. The Deluminator first appears in Philosopher's Stone when Dumbledore uses it to darken Privet Drive. In Deathly Hallows, it is bequeathed to Ron Weasley in Dumbledore's will. Later in the novel, the Deluminator serves a different function by helping Ron locate Harry and Hermione after he is separated from them. The device emits a ball of light that enters Ron's body and shows him the location of his friends.

=== Fake Galleon ===
In the novel Order of the Phoenix, the character Hermione Granger creates fake, enchanted Galleon coins that are used for communication between members of the student organisation Dumbledore's Army. The coins have numerals around the edge which display the time and date of the group's next meeting.

=== Howler ===
In the Harry Potter novels and films, a Howler is a letter sent to express extreme anger or to convey a message very loudly and publicly. When the Howler is opened, the sender's voice bellows the message at a deafening volume. The letter then self-destructs by burning.

=== Omnioculars ===
Omnioculars are presented as magical brass binoculars. Omnioculars, besides having the magnification capabilities of binoculars, have many other useful features. For example, they have the ability to slow down or replay something seen through the lenses, at the expense of the live view. They also have a play-by-play feature, where the names of moves performed by Quidditch players are shown in bright purple letters across the Omnioculars' lenses. Omnioculars also have the ability to list the names and numbers of the players, and can zero in on players rapidly.

=== Spellotape ===
Spellotape serves as magical adhesive tape. It is named after Sellotape, a popular brand which has become a generic name for transparent adhesive tape in the United Kingdom.

=== Wand ===
In the Harry Potter universe, a wand is a wooden rod used to perform spells. It is crafted by a wandmaker, who inserts a "core" into the wandwood. Common cores include phoenix tail feathers, unicorn tail hairs, and dragon heartstrings. The only wand shop depicted in the novels is Ollivanders, which is run by the wandmaker Garrick Ollivander. The Russian wandmaker Mykew Gregorovitch is mentioned several times in the novels—while Viktor Krum acknowledges Ollivander's skill, he claims that Gregorovitch's wands are the best.

In the United States, wand cores are created from the horn of river serpents, Wampus hair, Snallygaster heartstring, and Jackalope antlers, a practice originated in the 17th century by the first American wandmaker, Isolt Sayre, an Irish immigrant who founded the Ilvermorny School of Witchcraft and Wizardry in Massachusetts.

A wand is generally considered a very personal object. Wands belonging to other wizards can be borrowed, resulting in a comparatively less potent effect. In Philosopher's Stone, Harry had to try out many wands before he found one that "chose him". Wands with cores from the same source give strange effects (Priori Incantatem) when forced to fight each other, as is the case with Harry and Voldemort's wands. In Goblet of Fire, it is revealed each of their wands contains a tail feather from Fawkes, the phoenix belonging to Dumbledore. After Priori Incantatem, the wands get to know the opposites' master, as explained in Deathly Hallows. While, according to Ollivander, any object can channel magic if the wizard is strong enough, wands are the most commonly used because of their efficiency (due to the owner's bond with the wand itself). This can explain how some wizards are able to use spells without wands (for example, retrieving an item with Accio).

Furthermore, wands are able to be won from a witch or wizard and can therefore change their allegiance. For example, when Harry takes Draco's wand at Malfoy Manor, the wand's allegiance switches to Harry, and, by extension, so does the allegiance of the Elder Wand, which has changed hands many times. Not all wands change their allegiance—when discussing Bellatrix Lestrange's wand, Ollivander describes it as "unyeilding" and Hermione finds using it "distasteful" and difficult. Should a student be expelled from Hogwarts, their wand is confiscated and snapped in half. This type of damage is usually irreparable, although at the end of The Deathly Hallows Harry uses the Elder Wand to successfully repair his original broken wand.
