= Zouyu =

Legendary creature in old Chinese literature

- Zouyu illustration from the Chinese encyclopedia Gujin Tushu Jicheng
- Traditional Chinese: 騶虞
- Simplified Chinese: 驺虞
Transcriptions
Standard Mandarin
- Hanyu Pinyin: zōuyú
- IPA: [tsóʊ.y̌]
Middle Chinese
- Middle Chinese: *t͡ʃɨu ŋɨo
Old Chinese
- Baxter–Sagart (2014): *[ts]ˤro [ŋ]ʷ(r)a
- Zhengzhang: *ʔsru ŋʷa

Alternative Chinese name
- Traditional Chinese: 騶吾
- Simplified Chinese: 驺吾
Transcriptions
Standard Mandarin
- Hanyu Pinyin: zōuwú
Middle Chinese
- Middle Chinese: *t͡ʃɨu ŋuo
Old Chinese
- Baxter–Sagart (2014): *[ts]ˤro ŋˤa
- Zhengzhang: *ʔsru ŋaː

Second alternative Chinese name
- Traditional Chinese: 騶牙
- Simplified Chinese: 驺牙
Transcriptions
Standard Mandarin
- Hanyu Pinyin: zōuyá
Middle Chinese
- Middle Chinese: *t͡ʃɨu ŋˠa
Old Chinese
- Baxter–Sagart (2014): *[ts]ˤro m-ɢˤ<r>a
- Zhengzhang: *ʔsru ŋra:

The zouyu (Chinese: 騶虞; pinyin: zōu yú), also called zouwu (騶吾; zōu wú) or zouya (騶牙; zōu yá), is a legendary creature mentioned in old Chinese literature.

== Attestations ==
The earliest known appearance of the characters 騶虞 (zōu yú) is in the Book of Songs, but J.J.L. Duyvendak describes the interpretation of that little poem as referring to an animal of that name as "very doubtful".

The zouyu appears in a number of later works, where it is described as a "righteous" animal that, similarly to a qilin, only appears during the rule of a benevolent and sincere monarch. It is said to be as fierce-looking as a tiger, but gentle and strictly vegetarian, and described in some books (already in Shuowen Jiezi) as a white tiger with black spots.

In 1404, during the reign of the Yongle Emperor, Prince Zhu Su, his relative from Kaifeng (in modern-day Henan province) sent him a captured zouyu spotted and captured in Shenhou; an anonymous painter later painted that zouyu, which was evidently a rare white tiger. Another zouyu was sighted in Shandong. The zouyu sightings were mentioned by contemporaneous authors as good omens, along with the Yellow River running clear and the delivery of a qilin (i.e., an African giraffe) by a Bengal delegation that arrived to China aboard Zheng He's fleet.

== Identity ==
Puzzled about the real zoological identity of the zouyu said to be captured during the Yongle era, Duyvendak exclaimed, "Can it possibly have been a Pandah?" Following him, some modern authors consider zouyu to refer to the giant panda.

Sinologist and linguist Wolfgang Behr includes the zouyu ~ zouwu ~ zouya among several leophoric names in ancient Chinese texts, such as 獅子 (shī zǐ) and 狻猊 (suān ní), which denoted lions.

Riordan & Shi (2016) propose that zouyu ("驺瑜 [sic]") (Note: Riordan & Shi mistakenly give the pinyin transcription of 驺虞 (variants: 驺吾 ~ 騶吾) in the Classic of Mountains and Seas as Zhu Jian instead of Zou Yu.) and other words for some enigmatic pantherine predators in ancient Chinese texts (Note: For examples, the Meng Ji (孟極) in the Classic of Mountains and Seas; the Zun Er ("拵栭 [sic]" ~ "尊耳"; rendered "酋耳" (Qiu Er) in Siku Quanshu version) in Lost Book of Zhou, and the Pi Xiu (貔貅) in Records of the Grand Historian.) possibly denoted snow leopards. (Note: Riordan & Shi also state that the snow leopards were named Ai Ye Bao (艾叶豹 ~ 艾葉豹, "common mugwort leaves leopards") in Li Shizhen's Bencao Gangmu as well as He Ye Bao (荷叶豹 ~ 荷葉豹).)

== Popular culture ==
The creature appears in the 2018 fantasy film Fantastic Beasts: The Crimes of Grindelwald as an elephant-sized cat resembling a lion/tiger mix with large eyes, four upper tusks, and a ruffled tail (resembling those of Chinese guardian lions and those from Shang-Chi and the Legend of the Ten Rings three years later on) and has the ability to apparate.
