= Fictional universe of Harry Potter =

The fictional universe of the Harry Potter series of novels contains two distinct societies: the "wizarding world" and the "Muggle world". The term "Muggle world" refers to a society inhabited by non-magical humans ("Muggles"), while the term "wizarding world" refers to a society of wizards that live parallel to Muggles. The wizarding world is described as a veiled society wherein magic is commonly used and practised; the wizards live in self-enforced seclusion and hide their abilities from Muggles. The novels are set in 1990s Britain, which contains both Muggle and wizard communities. Any new works taking place in this universe are released under the Wizarding World brand.

== Fundamentals ==
The plot of the Harry Potter series occurs between 1991 and 1998. The exceptions are the opening chapter of the first novel, which takes place in 1981, and the epilogue of the seventh novel, which takes place in 2017. Evidence of this time period comes in the second novel, when the ghost character Nearly Headless Nick is celebrating the 500th anniversary of his 1492 death. At various points throughout the Harry Potter timeline, flashbacks and flash-forwards depict time periods ranging from the 1920s to the 2020s. The depiction of the wizarding world is centred on magic, which not only imbues objects such as wands, but is also portrayed as an inborn ability of individuals. This organic ability can be honed and mastered through study and practice.

Wizards expend a great deal of effort keeping Muggles unaware of magic and the wizarding world. The novels explain that in the past, the two worlds co-existed. Over the centuries, persecution of wizards by Muggles resulted in the creation of laws designed to keep the wizarding world hidden, such as the International Statute of Wizarding Secrecy of 1692. Enchantment of Muggle artifacts is forbidden, underage wizards are restricted from using magic outside of school, and any deliberate revelation of magical ability to the Muggle community is punishable. These laws are enforced by the British Ministry of Magic and the International Confederation of Wizards. There are some exceptions: Muggle relatives of British wizards are allowed to know about the wizarding world, as is the Prime Minister of the United Kingdom.

The film Fantastic Beasts and Where to Find Them (2016) depicts wizarding laws in the United States during the 1920s. These laws differ in some ways from those in 1990s Britain. For example, the film reveals that American wizards are forbidden from having any social relationships with non-magical people.

In the Harry Potter series, some aspects of the wizarding world are depicted as being less-than-modern compared to the Muggle world. Candles are used for illumination instead of electrical or gas lamps, and owls are used to send messages instead of phone calls or emails. Instead of using pens or computers to take notes and write essays, Hogwarts students use ink-dipped quills and parchment. Wizards do not use paper currency, but instead rely on three types of coins: the gold Galleon, the silver Sickle, and the bronze Knut. The wizarding world does have at least one train, the Hogwarts Express, which is pulled by a steam locomotive. The novels depict wizards using a magic-powered equivalent to radio, but there is not an equivalent to television.

=== Magic ===
J. K. Rowling, the creator of Harry Potter, based many magical elements in her fictional universe on real-world mythology and folklore. She has described this derivation as "a way of giving texture to the world". Before publishing the first Harry Potter novel, Rowling spent five years establishing the limitations of magic – determining what it can and cannot do. "The most important thing to decide when you're creating a fantasy world," she said in 2000, "is what the characters can't do." In the novels, the character Hermione Granger explains that food cannot be conjured out of thin air. Wizards can prepare it using magic and even multiply it, but they cannot create it. According to Rowling, money also cannot be conjured from nothing.

Wizards must learn how to control their magic. In young and untrained children, magical effects will occur spontaneously during moments of strong emotion. In the novels, almost all intentional magic is performed with a wand.

Spells are the every-purpose tools of a wizard. They are generally short bursts of magic used to accomplish a specialised task, such as creating fire or unlocking a door. Casting a spell usually requires the movement of a wand and the uttering of an incantation. The language of the incantations in the Harry Potter novels has been described as modified Latin. Although wizards in the novels almost always use a wand for casting spells, Rowling has used the Wizarding World website to describe certain wizarding cultures that practise magic without a wand.

== Geography ==
The wizarding world of the Harry Potter universe is embedded within the Muggle world. Wizards often live in magical enclaves within Muggle villages, such as Godric's Hollow in the West Country. Many wizarding homes in Harry Potter are depicted as being on the outskirts of a Muggle town. Only one settlement in Britain, the village of Hogsmeade, is home to an entirely magical population.

The wizarding high street of central London, Diagon Alley, lies just off Charing Cross Road. The Hogwarts Express train departs from King's Cross station using the fictional Platform 9¾. Magical locations are hidden by a combination of Muggle-repelling charms, illusions, and other protections. Some magical locations, such as the prison Azkaban and the stadium used for the Quidditch World Cup, are rendered "unplottable", meaning they are impossible to locate on a map. The castle of Hogwarts appears as abandoned ruins to any Muggle close enough to see.

== Blood purity ==
Some characters in the Harry Potter franchise refer to wizard families with ancestry that never inter-married with Muggles as "Pureblood." The term is used by villainous characters such as Voldemort and Malfoy with a connotation of superiority. In contrast, a witch or wizard who was descended from non-magical people, such as Hermione Granger, is pejoratively referred to as a "Mudblood" by such characters.

"Half-blood" is the term applied to wizards who have both magical and Muggle ancestry. Half-blood is the most common blood status, outnumbering pure-bloods and Muggle-borns. Rowling has stated that no bloodline is truly "pure," but those who wish to claim purity deny the existence of Muggles and squibs in their ancestry.

"Squib" is the term applied to a person who is born to magical parents, but has no magical abilities. Such characters include Argus Filch and Arabella Figg.

Some wizards are the offspring of unions between humans and magical creatures. Examples include the sisters Fleur and Gabrielle Delacour, who are granddaughters of a veela; Rubeus Hagrid, who is half-giant; and Filius Flitwick, who has goblin ancestry.

== Dark Arts ==
The Dark Arts are magical spells and practices that are usually used for malicious purposes. Practitioners of the Dark Arts are referred to as Dark wizards such as Voldemort and his followers, the Death Eaters. The type of spells characteristic of the Dark Arts are known as curses, which usually cause harm to the target. In the wizarding world, use of the Dark Arts is strongly stigmatised and certain spells are illegal. Hogwarts and other schools instruct students in Defence Against the Dark Arts. Some schools, such as Durmstrang, teach Dark magic. While Hogwarts is under Death Eaters' control, a Dark Arts class is taught.

Three "Unforgivable Curses" are introduced in Harry Potter, which are punishable by a life sentence in Azkaban prison. These are the "Killing Curse" (avada kedavra) causing immediate death, the "Cruciatus Curse" (crucio) causing intense pain, and the "Imperius Curse" (imperio) used for mind control or hypnosis.

== Death ==
In Goblet of Fire, Albus Dumbledore tells Harry and Sirius Black that magic cannot truly and permanently bring dead individuals back to life. However, there are methods of communicating with the dead in a limited way. For example, all Hogwarts headmasters appear in a magical portrait when they die, which allows future generations to consult with them. However, the portrait is a reflection of who the wizard was, and is not a link to their spirit. The Resurrection Stone allows the bearer to speak with the dead, but it cannot bring the dead back into the living world.

Likewise, it is not possible to make oneself immortal unless one uses an object of great power to sustain life, such as the Philosopher's Stone or a Horcrux. If one were to possess the three Deathly Hallows, it is fabled that they would possess the tools to become the "master of death". Other methods of extending life include drinking unicorn blood, which will keep a person alive even if death is imminent, but at the price of being cursed forever. Being magical can contribute to one's longevity, as there are several characters in the series who are unusually long-lived. It is revealed by Nearly Headless Nick in the fifth novel that all wizards have the choice of becoming ghosts upon dying; however, it is described as "a pale imitation of life". Rowling has stated that death is the most important theme in the novels.

== Magical creatures ==
The Harry Potter universe is home to many magical creatures. Some are derived from real-world folklore and mythology, while others were created by Rowling. Some are modified versions of creatures from real-world lore. A few of the creatures featured in the series include:

- Acromantula — A gigantic spider that is capable of human speech. The acromantula is an invention of Rowling.
- Basilisk — A giant snake-like reptile, originating in European classical mythology. In the Harry Potter universe, a person or animal will die if they make direct eye contact with a basilisk, but will be merely petrified (immobilized) if they make indirect eye contact, such as through a mirror.
- Centaur — A mythical creature, originating in Greek mythology, with a head and torso resembling those of a human, and with a lower body resembling that of a horse. Centaurs live in forests and are skilled in healing and astrology. Centaurs who associate with humans are often seen as traitors to their kind.
- Dementor — A tall, skeletal, black-cloaked creature that drains happiness from people and forces them to relive their worst memories. They can suck a person's soul out through their mouth, which is known as the "Dementor's Kiss". The dementor is an original creation of Rowling.
- Giant — A humanoid creature commonly found in all folklore around the globe. In the Harry Potter world, giants have considerable immunity to magical attacks. They can interbreed with humans, but wizards have actively driven them out of civilisation.
- Goblin — A short and stocky humanoid with black eyes, a domed head and long fingers, originating in European mythology. Goblins run Gringotts Bank and speak a language known as Gobbledegook.
- Hippogriff — A mythical creature that is part-eagle, part-horse. Wizards can own hippogriffs provided they cast a daily Disillusionment Charm on them.
- House-elf — A type of short, skinny, intensely magical humanoid based on the brownie / broonie of Scottish folklore. Witches and wizards enslave house-elves and they wear discarded items such as pillowcases as part of their servitude, and are freed by being given an item of clothing.
- Thestral — A carnivorous species of winged horse visible only to those who have experienced loss through death. They are described as having dragon-like faces, blank white eyes, large leathery wings and a black coat which clings to their almost-skeletal bodies. Hogwarts has a semi-tamed herd of thestrals, which pull the carriages that transport students to the castle. Thestrals can be ridden by wizards. The thestral is an original creation of Rowling.
- Veela — A nymph / fairy, originating in Slavic folklore, that sometimes resembles an exceptionally beautiful woman, and sometimes resembles a harpy. Veela are known for having the power to bewitch and enchant men.
- Werewolf — A cursed human who transforms into a wolf-like creature during the full moon. The person has no control over the process and cannot choose whether or not it occurs. The werewolves in Harry Potter are derived from those found in real-world folklore.

== Organisations ==
The Ministry of Magic is the government of the British wizarding community. The Minister for Magic, Cornelius Fudge, first appears in Chamber of Secrets. The Ministry of Magic is located in London and can be accessed by apparating, Floo travel or by a certain broken-down telephone box.

Young wizards in Britain usually attend Hogwarts School of Witchcraft and Wizardry. Following completion of a Hogwarts education, there is no standard tertiary education, and there are no known wizard universities. Successful Hogwarts students are considered ready to function as adults, though some wizarding professions require special training programmes after Hogwarts. These include the professions of the Auror and the Healer. In addition to Hogwarts, the novels mention the French wizarding school Beauxbatons and the Northern European school Durmstrang. In 2016, Rowling created four additional schools and described them on the Wizarding World website. These four schools are Ilvermorny (United States), Castelobruxo (Brazil), Mahoutokoro (Japan) and Uagadou (Africa).

== Communication ==
Wizards use owls to deliver mail, newspapers and parcels. The novels do not explain how an owl locates a recipient.

Characters painted into magical portraits can carry messages between locations where their portraits hang. For example, the former Hogwarts headmaster Phineas Nigellus travels between Dumbledore's office and his other portrait in Grimmauld Place.

Voldemort communicates with his underlings through the "Dark Mark", a brand that can be made to hurt remotely, signalling them to return to Voldemort.

Another form of closed communication used in the books and films is a set of mirrors that belonged to Sirius Black. Sirius gives Harry one mirror in Harry Potter and the Order of the Phoenix, with a note explaining to Harry that Sirius and James Potter used to use the mirrors to talk to each other when they were put in separate detentions. In Harry Potter and the Deathly Hallows, Harry uses a shard of his broken mirror to call for help.

== Transportation ==
=== Apparition ===
Apparating is disappearing from a place and appearing almost instantly in another. Wizards and witches often Apparate to their destinations, which is quite similar to teleportation. It is quite difficult to Apparate; therefore underage wizards and witches are forbidden to do it. There are many examples of failed Apparition attempts made by people who have not passed their "Apparition test", which is like a Muggle driving test. If not Apparating correctly, a person may lose a body part in the process, referred to as "splinching". In Deathly Hallows, Ron gets splinched after being grabbed by Yaxley, a Death Eater.

=== Other objects ===
The Harry Potter series features the "Floo Network", a mass-transit system that allows its users to travel to places such as the Ministry of Magic. "Portkeys" are mundane-looking objects that instantly transport people who touch them.

Characters in the series make use of several magical devices and artefacts to transport themselves within the Wizarding World and to the Muggle world. Among the most common of these objects are broomsticks, the Floo Network (a network of fireplaces magically connected to one another), the Knight Bus, and the Hogwarts Express. Some characters have been known to enchant Muggle vehicles to have magical features, such as Arthur Weasley's Ford Anglia or Sirius Black's Flying Motorbike. In Harry Potter and the Goblet of Fire, a discussion is held around the politics of importing flying carpets.

== Media ==
=== The Daily Prophet ===
The Daily Prophet is the most widely read daily newspaper in Britain's wizard community. Its journalistic integrity is lacking; it has been known to be more concerned about sales than about factual accuracy and is often a mouthpiece for the Ministry of Magic. As described by Rita Skeeter, "The Prophet exists to sell itself!"

The Prophet remains respectable for the first three books, but by Goblet of Fire, it has hired Rita Skeeter, an unscrupulous journalist who supplies several thrilling and blatantly false articles. When Minister Fudge takes the stance of firmly denying Voldemort's return, the Prophet initiates a smear campaign against Dumbledore and Harry, the most influential proponents of the opposing view. After Fudge is forced to admit that Voldemort has returned, the Prophet changes its stance overnight, calling Harry "a lone voice of truth".

According to Rowling, Ginny Weasley becomes Senior Quidditch correspondent at the Prophet after the events of the novels.

=== The Quibbler ===
The Quibbler is a magazine first mentioned in Order of the Phoenix. It is edited by Xenophilius Lovegood and often prints articles about conspiracy theories and cryptozoology. In Order of the Phoenix, Hermione blackmails Rita Skeeter into writing an article about Harry's encounter with Voldemort. The interview is published by Xenophilius, and he later sells it to the Daily Prophet.

== Food and leisure ==
=== Butterbeer ===
Butterbeer is a drink popular with young wizards. It can be served cold or hot, but either way it has a warming effect. Rowling said she imagines it tastes like "less-sickly" butterscotch. Even though it has very little alcohol, it is very strong for house elves, as Winky ended up developing an addiction for it after Barty Crouch Sr. sacked her. The Wizarding World of Harry Potter themed area at the Universal Orlando resort sells a line of food and beverages inspired by Butterbeer, and the Jelly Belly candy company has produced Butterbeer-inspired sweets. (Note: Attributed to multiple references:) The celebrity chef Heston Blumenthal created a version of the drink for his show "Heston's Tudor Feast".

=== Magical sweets ===
Many types of magical sweets are mentioned in the series. Some have bizarre side effects, particularly those created by Fred and George Weasley. Chocolate Frogs are packaged with collectible cards depicting famous wizards. According to Rowling, Harry and his friends are featured on Chocolate Frog cards after the events of the novels. Both Chocolate Frogs and Bertie Bott's Every-Flavour Beans have been manufactured in the real world. The Bertie Bott's Beans produced by Jelly Belly include flavours such as black pepper, dirt, earwax, grass, sausage, soap, and vomit. The Hershey company has also produced various candy items based on Harry Potter.

=== Quidditch ===
The most prominent sport in the Harry Potter universe is Quidditch, which is a team sport played up in the air on broomsticks. Every House at Hogwarts has a Quidditch team and competes in the Quidditch Cup. Outside of Hogwarts, the Quidditch World Cup is a major international event that draws teams and spectators from countries around the world.

=== Wizard's Chess ===
Wizard's Chess is a version of chess played with pieces that are magically animated. In Philosopher's Stone, Harry, Ron and Hermione become human chess pieces in a life-sized game of Wizard's Chess, which Harry wins thanks to Ron's skill at the game.

== See also ==
- Politics of Harry Potter
- The Magical Worlds of Harry Potter
