= Harry Potter and the Deathly Hallows =

2007 fantasy novel by J. K. Rowling

- Cover art of the original UK edition
- Author: J. K. Rowling
- Illustrator: Jason Cockcroft (first edition)
- Language: English
- Series: Harry Potter
- Release number: 7th in series
- Genre: Fantasy
- Publisher: Bloomsbury (UK)
- Publication date: 21 July 2007; 19 years ago
- Publication place: United Kingdom
- Pages: 607 (first edition)
- ISBN: 0-7475-9105-9
- Preceded by: Harry Potter and the Half-Blood Prince

Harry Potter and the Deathly Hallows is a fantasy novel by British author J. K. Rowling. It is the seventh and final novel in the Harry Potter series. It was released on 21 July 2007 in the United Kingdom by Bloomsbury Publishing, in the United States by Scholastic, and in Canada by Raincoast Books. The novel chronicles the events directly following Harry Potter and the Half-Blood Prince (2005) and the final confrontation between the two wizards Harry Potter and Lord Voldemort.

Deathly Hallows shattered sales records upon release, surpassing marks set by previous titles of the Harry Potter series. It holds the Guinness World Record for most novels sold within 24 hours of release, with 8.3 million sold in the US and 2.65 million in the UK. Reception to the book was generally positive, and the American Library Association named it a "Best Book for Young Adults". A film adaptation of the novel was released in two parts: Harry Potter and the Deathly Hallows – Part 1 in November 2010 and Part 2 in July 2011.

== Plot ==
The young wizard Harry Potter is about to turn seventeen. While being escorted to the Burrow by members of the Order of the Phoenix, the group is attacked by Death Eaters, who kill "Mad-Eye" Moody and Hedwig, and injure George Weasley. Lord Voldemort attempts to kill Harry but fails.

After the Death Eaters and Lord Voldemort take over the Ministry of Magic, Harry and his friends Ron Weasley and Hermione Granger begin searching for Voldemort's four remaining Horcruxes, which they hope to destroy and thus render him mortal. They learn that the locket Horcrux is in the possession of Dolores Umbridge at the Ministry of Magic. Harry and his friends infiltrate the Ministry and steal the locket from Umbridge, but are unable to destroy it. The locket's Dark magic affects Ron, who abandons Harry and Hermione. In Godric's Hollow, Harry and Hermione are attacked by Voldemort's snake Nagini, but manage to escape. One night, a Patronus guides Harry to a pond containing the Sword of Gryffindor. When he tries to recover it, the locket tightens around his neck, nearly drowning him. Ron returns and saves Harry, then destroys the Horcrux with the sword.

The three friends visit Xenophilius Lovegood, who tells them of the mythical objects known as the Deathly Hallows: the Elder Wand, the Resurrection Stone, and the Cloak of Invisibility. Xenophilius then alerts the Ministry of Magic to the presence of the trio in his home, and Harry and his friends flee. Soon after, they are captured by bounty hunters known as Snatchers, and are imprisoned in Malfoy Manor. Harry and Ron are thrown into the cellar with Dean Thomas, Luna Lovegood, Mr Ollivander, and Griphook the goblin, while the Death Eater Bellatrix Lestrange tortures Hermione. The house-elf Dobby helps the prisoners escape, but is killed in the process.

Harry, Ron, and Hermione break into Gringotts Bank and retrieve a Horcrux, Helga Hufflepuff’s cup. Voldemort learns of their mission which leads to Harry having visions of another Horcrux hidden at Hogwarts. After the trio enters the school with the help of Aberforth Dumbledore, Voldemort prepares to assault the castle. As the Death Eaters enter the school and fight the professors and students, Hermione destroys Hufflepuff’s cup. They then accompany Harry to the Room of Requirement, where they discover the next Horcrux, which is the Diadem of Ravenclaw. Draco Malfoy and his friends Crabbe and Goyle ambush them, and Crabbe casts a fire spell which grows out of control, killing him and destroying the Horcrux.

After stealing the Elder Wand from Albus Dumbledore's tomb, Voldemort is unable to make it obey him. Believing that Severus Snape is the master of the wand, Voldemort uses Nagini to mortally wound him. Before dying, Snape passes his memories to Harry, who views them in the Pensieve. The memories reveal that Snape loved Harry's mother, and acted as a double agent against Voldemort in an attempt to protect her. The memories also reveal that Dumbledore planned his own death at the hands of Snape so that Snape could gain Voldemort's trust, and that Harry himself became a Horcrux when Voldemort first tried to kill him. Now, Harry must die to render Voldemort mortal. On his way to surrender himself to Voldemort, Harry instructs Neville Longbottom to destroy Nagini.

Voldemort casts the Killing Curse on Harry, who then awakens in a dreamlike place. He is greeted by Dumbledore, who explains that the curse destroyed the fragment of Voldemort's soul inside Harry, and that Harry can now return to life. Harry subsequently regains consciousness and pretends to be dead. Voldemort orders Hagrid to carry Harry's body back to Hogwarts, and demands that the professors and students surrender; however, Neville pulls the Sword of Gryffindor from the Sorting Hat and kills Nagini. The battle resumes, during which Molly Weasley kills Bellatrix. Harry reveals himself to be alive and duels with Voldemort, who casts another Killing Curse. However, the Elder Wand refuses to kill Harry because he is its true master (the wand passed to Draco when he disarmed Dumbledore before his death, then to Harry when he disarmed Draco at his manor). Voldemort's spell rebounds and kills him.

In the novel's epilogue, set nineteen years later, Harry and his friends see their children off to Hogwarts. Harry and Ginny, now married, have three children: James Sirius, Albus Severus, and Lily Luna. Ron and Hermione have a daughter named Rose and a son named Hugo.

== Background ==
=== Series ===
The first novel in the Harry Potter series, Harry Potter and the Philosopher's Stone, was published by Bloomsbury Publishing in 1997. It was followed by Chamber of Secrets (1998), Prisoner of Azkaban (1999), Goblet of Fire (2000), Order of the Phoenix (2003) and Half-Blood Prince (2005). (Note: Attributed to multiple references:)

=== Title ===
The title of the novel refers to three mythical objects featured in the story, which are collectively known as the "Deathly Hallows". Rowling announced the title in December 2006 through a Christmas-themed hangman puzzle on her website. Other titles that Rowling considered were Harry Potter and the Elder Wand and Harry Potter and the Peverell Quest.

=== Writing ===
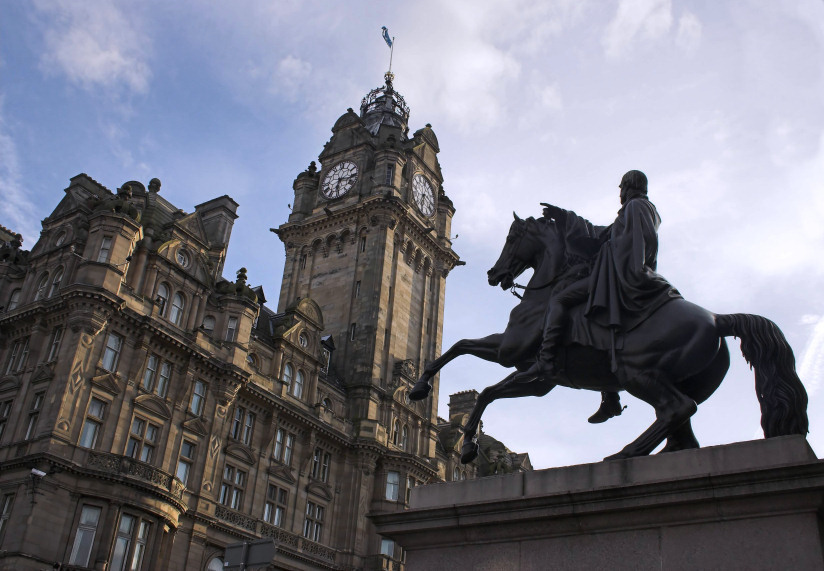
Rowling completed the final chapters of Deathly Hallows in Room 552 of the Balmoral Hotel.

J. K. Rowling completed the novel in January 2007 while staying at the Balmoral Hotel in Edinburgh. In a statement on her website, she said, "I've never felt such a mixture of extreme emotions in my life, never dreamed I could feel simultaneously heartbroken and euphoric." She compared her mixed feelings to those expressed by Charles Dickens in the preface of the 1850 edition of David Copperfield, "a two-years' imaginative task". "To which," she added, "I can only sigh, try seventeen years, Charles". She ended her message by saying "Deathly Hallows is my favourite, and that is the most wonderful way to finish the series".

When asked before publication about the forthcoming book, Rowling stated that she could not change the ending even if she wanted. "These books have been plotted for such a long time, and for six books now, that they're all leading a certain direction. So, I really can't". She also commented that the final volume related closely to the previous book in the series, Harry Potter and the Half-Blood Prince, "almost as though they are two-halves of the same novel". She said the last chapter of Deathly Hallows was written around 1990 as part of her earliest work on the series. She also revealed that the last sentence was originally something akin to "Only those who he loved could see his lightning scar". She changed the sentence to "All was well" because she wanted it to be clear that Harry Potter had triumphed over Lord Voldemort and that he would not have to face him again.

== Release ==
=== Marketing and promotion ===
The launch of Deathly Hallows was celebrated by an all-night book signing and reading by Rowling at the Natural History Museum in London. The 1,700 guests in attendance were chosen by ballot. Rowling toured the United States in October 2007, where another event was held at Carnegie Hall in New York City with tickets allocated by sweepstake. Scholastic, the American publisher of the Harry Potter series, launched a multimillion-dollar "There will soon be 7" marketing campaign with a Knight Bus travelling to 40 libraries across the United States, online fan discussions and competitions, collectible bookmarks, tattoos, and the staged release of seven Deathly Hallows questions most debated by fans.

Rowling arranged with her publishers for a poster bearing the face of the missing British child Madeleine McCann to be made available to book sellers when Deathly Hallows was launched on 21 July 2007, and said that she hoped that the posters would be displayed prominently in shops all over the world. After it was announced that the novel would be released on 21 July 2007, Warner Bros. stated that the film adaptation of Harry Potter and the Order of the Phoenix would be released on 13 July. In response, fans proclaimed July 2007 as the month of Harry Potter.

=== Spoiler embargo ===
Bloomsbury invested £10 million in an attempt to keep the book's contents secure until 21 July, the release date. Arthur Levine, US editor of the Harry Potter series, denied distributing any copies of Deathly Hallows in advance for press review, but two US papers published early reviews anyway. There was speculation that some shops would break the embargo and distribute copies of the book early, as the penalty imposed for previous instalments—that the distributor would not be supplied with any further copies of the series—would no longer be a deterrent.

=== Online leaks and early delivery ===
In the week before its release, a number of texts purporting to be genuine leaks appeared in various forms. On 16 July, a set of photographs representing all 759 pages of the US edition was leaked and was fully transcribed prior to the official release date. The photographs later appeared on websites and peer-to-peer networks, leading Scholastic to seek a subpoena in order to identify one source. This represented the most serious security breach in the Harry Potter series' history. Rowling and her lawyer confirmed that there were genuine online leaks. Reviews published in both The Baltimore Sun and The New York Times on 18 July 2007, corroborated many of the plot elements from this leak, and about one day prior to release, The New York Times confirmed that the main circulating leak was real.

Scholastic announced that approximately one-ten-thousandth (0.0001) of the US supply had been shipped early — interpreted to mean about 1,200 copies. One reader in Maryland received a copy of the book in the mail from DeepDiscount.com four days before it was launched, which evoked incredulous responses from both Scholastic and DeepDiscount. Scholastic initially reported that they were satisfied it had been a "human error" and would not discuss possible penalties; however, the following day Scholastic announced that it would be launching legal action against DeepDiscount.com and its distributor, Levy Home Entertainment. Scholastic filed for damages in Chicago's Circuit Court of Cook County, claiming that DeepDiscount engaged in a "complete and flagrant violation of the agreements that they knew were part of the carefully constructed release of this eagerly awaited book." Some of the early-release books soon appeared on eBay, in one case being sold to Publishers Weekly for US$250 from an initial price of US$18.

=== Price wars and other controversies ===
Asda, along with several other UK supermarkets, having already taken pre-orders for the book at a heavily discounted price, sparked a price war two days before the book's launch by announcing they would sell it for just £5 a copy. Other retail chains then also offered the book at discounted prices. At these prices the book became a loss leader. This caused uproar from traditional UK booksellers who argued they had no hope of competing in those conditions. Independent shops protested loudest, but even Waterstone's, the UK's largest dedicated chain bookstore, could not compete with the supermarket price. Some small bookstores hit back by buying their stock from the supermarkets rather than their wholesalers. Asda attempted to counter this by imposing a limit of two copies per customer to prevent bulk purchases. Philip Wicks, a spokesman for the UK Booksellers Association, said, "It is a war we can't even participate in. We think it's a crying shame that the supermarkets have decided to treat it as a loss-leader, like a can of baked beans." Michael Norris, an analyst at Simba Information, said: "You are not only lowering the price of the book. At this point, you are lowering the value of reading."

In Malaysia, a similar price war caused controversy regarding sales of the book. Four of the biggest bookstore chains in Malaysia, MPH Bookstores, Popular Bookstores, Times and Harris, decided to pull Harry Potter and the Deathly Hallows off their shelves as a protest against Tesco and Carrefour hypermarkets. The retail price of the book in Malaysia was MYR 109.90, while the hypermarkets Tesco and Carrefour sold the book at MYR 69.90. The move by the bookstores was seen as an attempt to pressure the distributor Penguin Books to remove the books from the hypermarkets. However, as of 24 July 2007, the price war had ended, with the four bookstores involved resuming selling the books in their stores with discount. Penguin Books has also confirmed that Tesco and Carrefour were selling the book at a loss, urging them to practise good business sense and fair trade. The book's early Saturday morning release in Israel was criticised for violating Shabbat. Trade and Industry Minister Eli Yishai commented "It is forbidden, according to Jewish values and Jewish culture, that a thing like this should take place at 2 am on Saturday. Let them do it on another day." Yishai indicated that he would issue indictments and fines based on the Hours of Work and Rest Law.

=== Editions ===
Harry Potter and the Deathly Hallows was released in hardcover on 21 July 2007 and in paperback in the United Kingdom on 10 July 2008 and the United States on 7 July 2009. In SoHo, New York, there was a release party for the American paperback edition, with many games and activities. An "Adult Edition" with a different cover illustration was released by Bloomsbury on 21 July 2007. To be released simultaneously with the original US hardcover on 21 July with only 100,000 copies was a Scholastic deluxe edition, highlighting a new cover illustration by Mary GrandPré. In October 2010, Bloomsbury released a "Celebratory" paperback edition, which featured a foiled and starred cover. Lastly, on 1 November 2010, a "Signature" edition of the novel was released in paperback by Bloomsbury.

=== Translations ===
As with previous books in the series, Harry Potter and the Deathly Hallows has been translated into many languages. The first translation to be released was the Ukrainian translation, on 25 September 2007 (as Гаррі Поттер і смертельні реліквії – Harry Potter i smertel'ni relikviji). The Swedish title of the book was revealed by Rowling as Harry Potter and the Relics of Death (Harry Potter och Dödsrelikerna), following a pre-release question from the Swedish publisher about the difficulty of translating the two words "Deathly Hallows" without having read the book. This is also the title used for the French translation (Harry Potter et les reliques de la mort), the Spanish translation (Harry Potter y las Reliquias de la Muerte), the Dutch translation (Harry Potter en de Relieken van de Dood), the Serbian translation (Хари Потер и реликвије смрти – Hari Poter i relikvije smrti) and the Brazilian Portuguese translation (Harry Potter e as Relíquias da Morte). The first Polish translation was released with a new title: Harry Potter i Insygnia Śmierci – Harry Potter and the Insignia of Death. The Hindi translation Harry Potter aur Maut ke Tohfe (हैरी पॉटर और मौत के तोहफे), which means "Harry Potter and the Gifts of Death", was released by Manjul Publication in India on 27 June 2008. The Romanian version was released on 1 December 2007 using the title (Harry Potter și Talismanele Morții).

== Reception ==
=== Critical response ===
The Baltimore Sun's critic, Mary Carole McCauley, noted that the book was more serious than the previous novels in the series and had more straightforward prose. Furthermore, reviewer Alice Fordham from The Times wrote that "Rowling's genius is not just her total realisation of a fantasy world, but the quieter skill of creating characters that bounce off the page, real and flawed and brave and lovable". Fordham concluded, "We have been a long way together, and neither Rowling nor Harry let us down in the end". The New York Times writer Michiko Kakutani agreed, praising Rowling's ability to make Harry both a hero and a character that can be related to.

Time magazine's Lev Grossman named it one of the Top 10 Fiction Books of 2007, ranking it at No. 8, and praised Rowling for proving that books can still be a global mass medium. Novelist Elizabeth Hand criticised that "... the spectacularly complex interplay of narrative and character often reads as though an entire trilogy's worth of summing-up has been crammed into one volume." In a starred review from Kirkus Reviews, the reviewer said, "Rowling has shown uncommon skill in playing them with and against each other, and also woven them into a darn good bildungsroman, populated by memorable characters and infused with a saving, irrepressible sense of fun". They also praised the second half of the novel, but criticised the epilogue, calling it "provocatively sketchy". In another review from The Times, reviewer Amanda Craig said that while Rowling was "not an original, high-concept author", she was "right up there with other greats of children's fiction". Craig went on to say that the novel was "beautifully judged, and a triumphant return to form", and that Rowling's imagination changed the perception of an entire generation, which "is more than all but a handful of living authors, in any genre, have achieved in the past half-century".

In contrast, Jenny Sawyer of The Christian Science Monitor said: "There is much to love about the Harry Potter series, from its brilliantly realised magical world to its multilayered narrative ... A story is about someone who changes. And, puberty aside, Harry doesn't change much. As envisioned by Rowling, he walks the path of good so unwaveringly that his final victory over Voldemort feels, not just inevitable, but hollow." In The New York Times, Christopher Hitchens compared the series to World War Two-era English boarding school stories, and while he wrote that "Rowling has won imperishable renown" for the series as a whole, he also stated that he disliked Rowling's use of deus ex machina, that the mid-book camping chapters are "abysmally long", and Voldemort "becomes more tiresome than an Ian Fleming villain". Catherine Bennett of The Guardian praised Rowling for putting small details from the previous books and making them large in Deathly Hallows, such as Grindelwald being mentioned on a Chocolate Frog Card in the first book. While she points out "as her critics say, Rowling is no Dickens", she says that Rowling "has willed into a fictional being, in every book, legions of new characters, places, spells, rules and scores of unimagined twists and subplots".

Stephen King criticised the reactions of some reviewers to the books, including McCauley, for jumping too quickly to surface conclusions of the work. He felt this was inevitable, because of the extreme secrecy before launch which did not allow reviewers time to read and consider the book, but meant that many early reviews lacked depth. Rather than finding the writing style disappointing, he felt it had matured and improved. He acknowledged that the subject matter of the books had become more adult, and that Rowling had clearly been writing with the adult audience firmly in mind since the middle of the series. He compared the works in this respect to Huckleberry Finn and Alice in Wonderland which achieved success and have become established classics, in part by appealing to the adult audience as well as children.

=== Sales ===
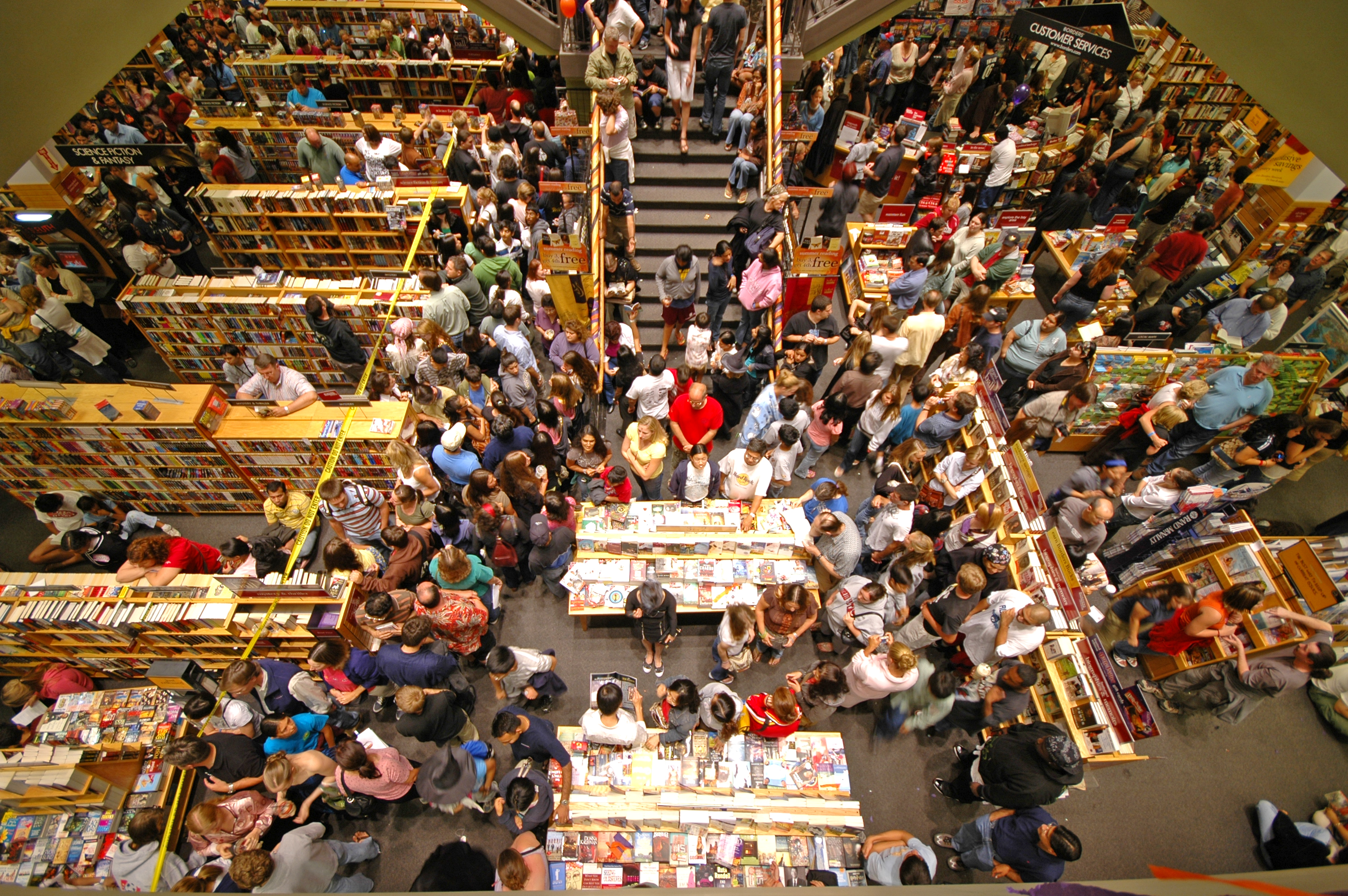
Lines at a Californian Borders, five minutes until midnight to buy the book

Sales for Harry Potter and the Deathly Hallows were record-setting. The initial US print run for Deathly Hallows was 12 million copies, and more than a million were pre-ordered through Amazon and Barnes & Noble, 500 per cent higher than pre-sales had been for Half-Blood Prince. On 12 April 2007, Barnes & Noble declared that Deathly Hallows had broken its pre-order record, with more than 500,000 copies pre-ordered through its site. On opening day, a record 8.3 million copies were sold in the United States (over 96 per second), and 2.65 million copies in the United Kingdom. It holds the Guinness World record for fastest selling book of fiction in 24 hours for US sales. At WH Smith, sales reportedly reached a rate of 15 books sold per second. By June 2008, nearly a year after it was published, worldwide sales were reportedly around 44 million.

=== Awards and honours ===
Harry Potter and the Deathly Hallows has won several awards. In 2007, the book was named one of The New York Times 100 Notable Books, and one of its Notable Children's Books. The novel was named the best book of 2007, by Newsweek's critic Malcolm Jones. Publishers Weekly also listed Harry Potter and the Deathly Hallows among their Best Books of 2007. Also in 2007 the book received the Andre Norton Award for Young Adult Science Fiction and Fantasy at the Nebula Awards. In 2008, the American Library Association named the novel one of its Best Books for Young Adults, and also listed it as a Notable Children's Book. Furthermore, Harry Potter and the Deathly Hallows received the 2008 Colorado Blue Spruce Book Award.

== Themes ==
=== Death ===
In a 2006 interview, Rowling said that the main theme of the series is Harry dealing with death, which was influenced by her mother's death in 1990. (Note: Attributed to multiple references:) Lev Grossman of Time asserted that the main theme of the series is the importance of continuing to love in the face of death.

=== Living in a corrupted society ===
Academics and journalists have developed many other interpretations of themes in the books, some more complex than others, and some including political subtexts. Themes such as normality, oppression, survival, and overcoming imposing odds have all been considered as prevalent throughout the series. Similarly, the theme of making one's way through adolescence and "going over one's most harrowing ordeals—and thus coming to terms with them" has also been considered. Rowling has stated that the books comprise "a prolonged argument for tolerance, a prolonged plea for an end to bigotry" and that also pass on a message to "question authority and ... not assume that the establishment or the press tells you all of the truth". Timothy Snyder in his 2017 book On Tyranny mentioned the novel as a recent example illustrating resistance to totalitarianism.

=== Christian allegories ===
The Harry Potter series has been criticised for supposedly supporting witchcraft and the occult. Before publication of Deathly Hallows, Rowling refused to speak out about her religion, stating, "If I talk too freely, every reader, whether 10 or 60, will be able to guess what's coming in the books". However, many have commented on Christian allegories that appear in Deathly Hallows. For example, Harry dies and then comes back to life to save mankind, like Christ. The location where this occurs is King's Cross. Rowling also stated that "my belief and my struggling with religious belief ... I think is quite apparent in this book", which is shown as Harry struggles with his faith in Dumbledore.

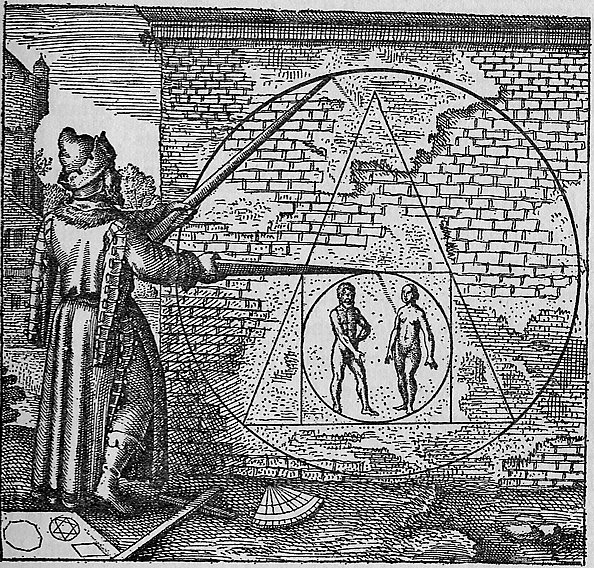
The Philosopher's Stone as pictured in Michael Maier's 1617 alchemical work Atalanta Fugiens, similar to the presentation of the Deathly Hallows and Resurrection Stone.

Deathly Hallows begins with a pair of epigraphs, one by Quaker leader William Penn and one from Aeschylus' The Libation Bearers. Of this, Rowling said "I really enjoyed choosing those two quotations because one is pagan, of course, and one is from a Christian tradition. I'd known it was going to be those two passages since Chamber was published. I always knew [that] if I could use them at the beginning of book seven then I'd cued up the ending perfectly. If they were relevant, then I went where I needed to go. They just say it all to me, they really do".

When Harry visits his parents' grave, the biblical reference "The last enemy that shall be destroyed is death" (1 Corinthians 15:26) is inscribed on the grave. The Dumbledores' family tomb also holds a biblical quote: "Where your treasure is, there your heart will be also", which is from Matthew 6:21. Rowling states, "They're very British books, so on a very practical note Harry was going to find biblical quotations on tombstones ... [but] I think those two particular quotations he finds on the tombstones at Godric's Hollow, they sum up – they almost epitomise the whole series".

Harry Potter pundit John Granger additionally noted that one of the reasons the Harry Potter books were so popular is their use of literary alchemy (similar to Romeo and Juliet, C. S. Lewis's Perelandra and Charles Dickens's A Tale of Two Cities) and vision symbolism. In this model, authors weave allegorical tales along the alchemical magnum opus. Since the medieval period, alchemical allegory has mirrored the passion, death and resurrection of Christ. While the entire series utilises symbols common in alchemy, the Deathly Hallows completes this cycle, tying themes of death, rebirth, and the Resurrection Stone to the principal motif of alchemical allegory, and topics presented in the first book of the series.

== Adaptations ==
=== Films ===
The two-part film adaptation of Harry Potter and the Deathly Hallows was directed by David Yates, written by Steve Kloves and produced by David Heyman, David Barron, and Rowling. Part 1 was released on 19 November 2010, with Part 2 following on 15 July 2011. Filming began in February 2009 and wrapped on 12 June 2010, with reshoots for Part 2's epilogue scene taking place in December 2010. Part 1 ended at Chapter 24 of the book, in which Voldemort acquires the Elder Wand. There were a few omissions, such as the appearances of Dean Thomas and Viktor Krum, and Peter Pettigrew's death. James Bernadelli of Reelviews said that the script stuck closest to the text since Harry Potter and the Chamber of Secrets, yet this was met with negativity from some audiences as the film inherited "the book's own problems".

=== Audiobooks ===
Harry Potter and the Deathly Hallows was released simultaneously on 21 July 2007, in both the UK and the United States. The UK edition features the voice of Stephen Fry and runs about 24 hours while the US edition features the voice of Jim Dale and runs about 21 hours. Both Fry and Dale recorded 146 different and distinguishable character voices, and was the most recorded by an individual on an audiobook at the time. For his work on Deathly Hallows, Dale won the 2008 Grammy Award for the Best Spoken Word Album for Children. He also was awarded an Earphone Award by AudioFile, who claimed, "Dale has raised the bar on audiobook interpretation so high it's hard to imagine any narrator vaulting over it."

=== Video games ===
Two action-adventure video games were produced by Electronic Arts (EA) to coincide with the release of the film adaptations, as with each of the previous Harry Potter films. Part 1 was released on 16 November 2010, and Part 2 on 12 July 2011. Both games received a mixed to negative reaction from critics.

== Subsequent works ==
=== The Tales of Beedle the Bard ===
On 4 December 2008, Rowling released The Tales of Beedle the Bard both in the UK and US. The Tales of Beedle the Bard is a spin-off of Deathly Hallows and contains fairy tales that are told to children in the "Wizarding World". The book includes five short stories, including "The Tale of the Three Brothers", which is the story of the Deathly Hallows. Amazon released an exclusive collector's edition of the book which is a replica of the book that Amazon purchased at auction in December 2007. Seven copies were auctioned off in London by Sotheby's. Each was illustrated and handwritten by Rowling and is 157 pages. It was bound in brown Moroccan leather and embellished with five hand-chased hallmarked sterling silver ornaments and mounted moonstones.

=== Harry Potter and the Cursed Child ===
In 2016, Harry Potter and the Cursed Child was released, a two-part play written by Jack Thorne based on an original story by Rowling, Thorne, and John Tiffany. Billed as the eighth story in the Harry Potter series, it picks up where the epilogue of Deathly Hallows left off, following an adult Harry Potter and his son, Albus Severus Potter. Previews of the play began at the Palace Theatre, London, on 7 June 2016, and it premiered on 30 July 2016. The play opened on Broadway on 21 April 2018 at the Lyric Theatre, with previews starting on 16 March 2018. Both parts of the stage play's script have been released in print and digital formats as Harry Potter and the Cursed Child Parts I & II. The first edition, the Special Rehearsal Edition, corresponded to the script used in the preview shows and was published on 31 July 2016, the date of Harry's birthday in the series and Rowling's birthday, as well. Since revisions to the script continued after the book was printed, an edited version was released on 25 July 2017, as the "Definitive Collector's Edition". According to CNN, this was the most preordered book of 2016.

== Bibliography ==
- Granger, John. The Deathly Hallows Lectures: The Hogwarts Professor Explains the Final Harry Potter Adventure. Zossima Press: 2008. ISBN 0-9723221-7-5.
- Hall, Susan. Reading Harry Potter: critical essays. Greenwood Publishing: 2003. ISBN 0-313-32067-5.
- Rowling, JK. Harry Potter and the Half-Blood Prince. London: Bloomsbury/New York City: Scholastic: 2005. UK ISBN 0-747-58108-8/US ISBN 0-439-78454-9.
- Rowling, JK. Harry Potter and the Goblet of Fire. London: Bloomsbury/New York City: Scholastic: 2000. UK ISBN 0-747-54624-X/US ISBN 0-439-13959-7.
- Shapiro, Marc. J. K. Rowling: The Wizard Behind Harry Potter. St. Martin's Press: 2007. ISBN 0-312-37697-9.
- Heckl, Raik. "The Tale of the Three Brothers" and the Idea of the Speaking Dead in the Harry Potter Novels Archived 8 January 2016 at the Wayback Machine. Leipzig: 2008.
