= List of Harry Potter (film series) cast members =

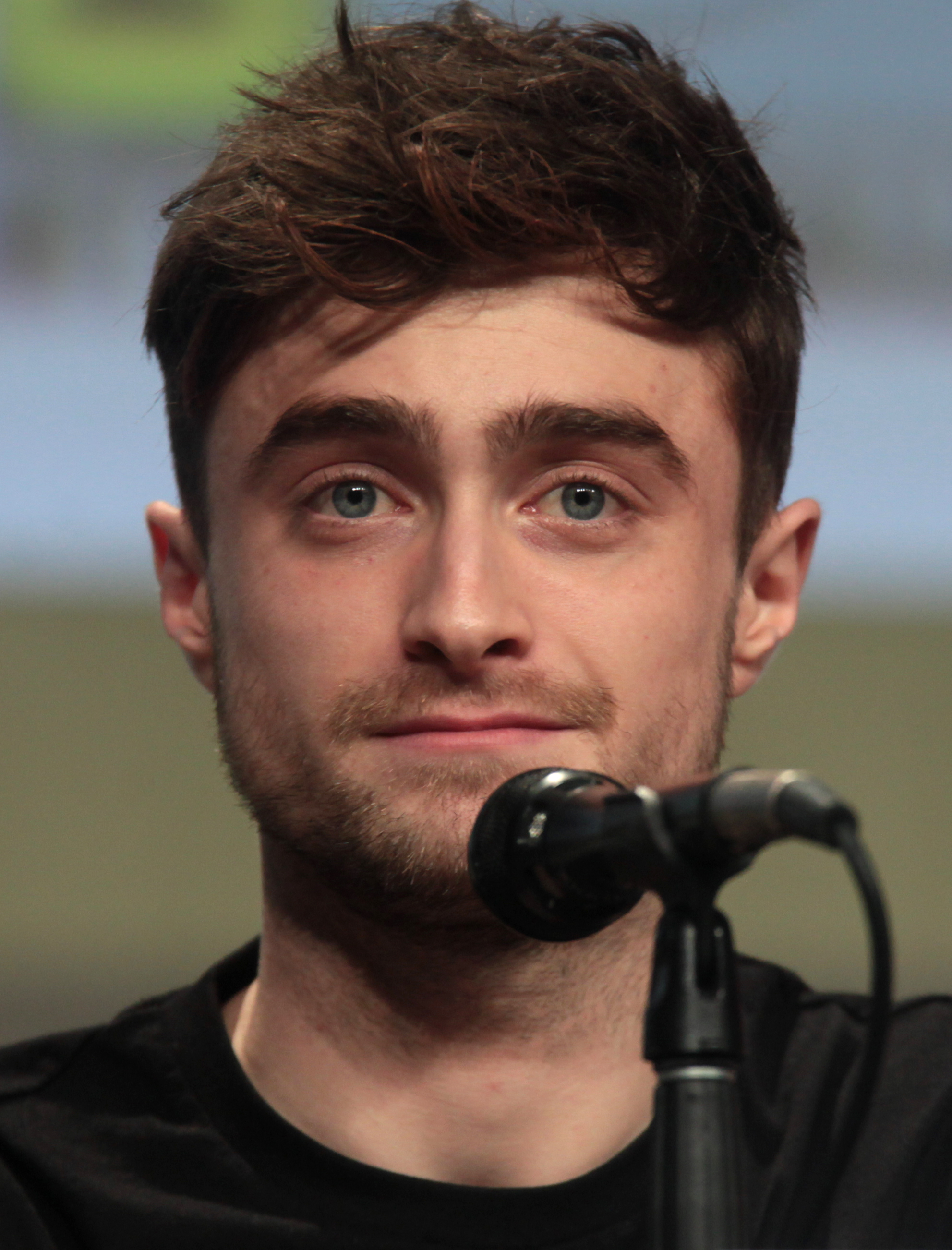
Daniel Radcliffe, who portrayed the series' title character, Harry Potter, was the icon of the film series from the release of the first film in 2001.

Dozens of actors from the United Kingdom and Ireland portrayed or voiced characters appearing in the Harry Potter film series based on the book series by J. K. Rowling.

== Overview ==
In all the films, Daniel Radcliffe played Harry Potter, Rupert Grint played Ron Weasley and Emma Watson played Hermione Granger. When they were cast only Radcliffe had previously acted in a film. Complementing them on screen are such actors as Helena Bonham Carter, Jim Broadbent, John Cleese, Robbie Coltrane, Warwick Davis, Ralph Fiennes, Michael Gambon, Brendan Gleeson, Richard Griffiths, Richard Harris, John Hurt, Jason Isaacs, Miriam Margolyes, Helen McCrory, Gary Oldman, Alan Rickman, Fiona Shaw, Maggie Smith, Timothy Spall, Imelda Staunton, David Thewlis, Emma Thompson, and Julie Walters, among others. Thirteen actors appeared as the same character in all eight films of the series.

Some well-known British actors who have not appeared in the series were asked in jest why they had not been cast. When David Yates was directing the fifth film, Bill Nighy (who knew Yates personally) said that he hoped the director would cast him in Harry Potter. "But nobody called", Nighy added. However, in 2009, Yates cast Nighy as Minister of Magic Rufus Scrimgeour in the seventh film. Nighy said, "I am no longer the only English actor not to be in Harry Potter and I am very pleased." Jude Law once quipped, "Nobody's asked me. I was a bit too old for Harry." He would later be cast as a younger Albus Dumbledore in Fantastic Beasts: The Crimes of Grindelwald.

J. K. Rowling gave a speech at the premiere of the final film in the series, Harry Potter and the Deathly Hallows – Part 2, on 7 July 2011 in London. Rowling praised the film series' acting talent and announced that there are seven young Harry Potter cast members whom she refers to as "The Big Seven"; they are Radcliffe, Grint, Watson, Tom Felton, Matthew Lewis, Evanna Lynch and Bonnie Wright.

== Cast and characters ==
List indicators

This section includes characters who have appeared in a film in the series.

- An empty grey cell indicates the character was not in the film.
- ^{A} indicates an appearance through archival footage or audio.
- ^{C} indicates a cameo role.
- ^{E} indicates an appearance not included in the theatrical cut.
- ^{V} indicates a voice-only role.
- ^{Y} indicates a younger version of the character.

The list below is sorted by film and the character's surname, as some characters have been portrayed by multiple actors.

Character	Philosopher's Stone (2001)	Chamber of Secrets (2002)	Prisoner of Azkaban (2004)	Goblet of Fire (2005)	Order of the Phoenix (2007)	Half-Blood Prince (2009)	Deathly Hallows – Part 1 (2010)	Deathly Hallows – Part 2 (2011)
=== Introduced in Philosopher's Stone ===
Katie Bell	Emily Dale	Emily Dale				Georgina Leonidas	Georgina Leonidas	Georgina Leonidas
The Bloody Baron	Terence Bayler							
Susan Bones	Eleanor Columbus	Eleanor Columbus						
Vincent Crabbe (Note: Vincent Crabbe is a recurring minor character who appears in every book, and dies in a pivotal scene in Deathly Hallows. During production of the seventh film, Waylett pleaded guilty to charges of growing marijuana, and Joshua Herdman, who plays Crabbe's cohort Gregory Goyle, said in August 2009 that Waylett would not reprise his role. Herdman's character instead died in the final film.)	Jamie Waylett	Jamie Waylett	Jamie Waylett	Jamie Waylett	Jamie Waylett	Jamie Waylett		
Dedalus Diggle	David Brett							
Albus Dumbledore (Note: Gambon replaced Harris as Dumbledore from Prisoner of Azkaban onwards after Harris's death.)	Richard Harris	Richard Harris	Michael Gambon	Michael Gambon	Michael Gambon	Michael Gambon	Michael Gambon Toby Regbo^{Y}	Michael Gambon
Dudley Dursley	Harry Melling	Harry Melling	Harry Melling		Harry Melling		Harry Melling	
Petunia Dursley	Fiona Shaw	Fiona Shaw	Fiona Shaw		Fiona Shaw		Fiona Shaw	Ariella Paradise^{Y}
Vernon Dursley	Richard Griffiths	Richard Griffiths	Richard Griffiths		Richard Griffiths		Richard Griffiths	
The Fat Friar	Simon Fisher-Becker							
The Fat Lady	Elizabeth Spriggs		Dawn French					
Marcus Flint	Jamie Yeates	Jamie Yeates						
Argus Filch	David Bradley	David Bradley	David Bradley	David Bradley	David Bradley	David Bradley		David Bradley
Seamus Finnigan	Devon Murray	Devon Murray	Devon Murray	Devon Murray	Devon Murray	Devon Murray	Devon Murray	Devon Murray
Filius Flitwick (Note: Davis played Filius Flitwick in the first two films as a white-haired old man. In pre-production for the third film, the producers told Davis there was no role for Flitwick, but that they would like to have him play somebody else at least in a cameo. Davis played a much younger-looking man with dark hair and moustache who is seen directing a choir at the Hogwarts welcome feast, and was credited as "Wizard". During pre-production of Goblet of Fire, director Mike Newell told Davis he wanted to keep the character's look from the previous film permanent.)	Warwick Davis	Warwick Davis	Warwick Davis	Warwick Davis	Warwick Davis	Warwick Davis		Warwick Davis
Firenze	Ray Fearon^{V}							
Gregory Goyle	Joshua Herdman	Joshua Herdman	Joshua Herdman	Joshua Herdman	Joshua Herdman	Joshua Herdman	Joshua Herdman	Joshua Herdman
Hermione Granger	Emma Watson	Emma Watson	Emma Watson	Emma Watson	Emma Watson	Emma Watson	Emma Watson	Emma Watson
Griphook	Verne Troyer; Warwick Davis^{V}						Warwick Davis	Warwick Davis
Rubeus Hagrid	Robbie Coltrane	Robbie Coltrane Martin Bayfield^{Y}	Robbie Coltrane	Robbie Coltrane	Robbie Coltrane	Robbie Coltrane	Robbie Coltrane	Robbie Coltrane
Rolanda Hooch	Zoë Wanamaker							
Angelina Johnson	Danielle Tabor	Danielle Tabor	Danielle Tabor	Tiana Benjamin				
Lee Jordan	Luke Youngblood	Luke Youngblood						
Neville Longbottom	Matthew Lewis	Matthew Lewis	Matthew Lewis	Matthew Lewis	Matthew Lewis	Matthew Lewis	Matthew Lewis	Matthew Lewis
Draco Malfoy	Tom Felton	Tom Felton	Tom Felton	Tom Felton	Tom Felton	Tom Felton	Tom Felton	Tom Felton
Minerva McGonagall	Maggie Smith	Maggie Smith	Maggie Smith	Maggie Smith	Maggie Smith	Maggie Smith		Maggie Smith
Sir Nicholas de Mimsy-Porpington Nearly Headless Nick	John Cleese	John Cleese						
Garrick Ollivander	John Hurt						John Hurt	John Hurt
Peeves	Rik Mayall^{E}							
Harry Potter	Daniel Radcliffe Saunders triplets^{Y}	Daniel Radcliffe	Daniel Radcliffe	Daniel Radcliffe	Daniel Radcliffe	Daniel Radcliffe	Daniel Radcliffe	Daniel Radcliffe Toby Papworth^{Y}
James Potter	Adrian Rawlins	Adrian Rawlins^{A}	Adrian Rawlins	Adrian Rawlins	Adrian Rawlins Robbie Jarvis^{Y}		Adrian Rawlins	Adrian Rawlins Alfie McIlwain^{Y}
Lily Potter	Geraldine Somerville	Geraldine Somerville^{A}	Geraldine Somerville	Geraldine Somerville	Geraldine Somerville	Geraldine Somerville	Geraldine Somerville	Geraldine Somerville Ellie Darcey-Alden^{Y}
Quirinus Quirrell	Ian Hart							Ian Hart^{A}
Helena Ravenclaw The Grey Lady	Nina Young							Kelly Macdonald
Severus Snape	Alan Rickman	Alan Rickman	Alan Rickman	Alan Rickman	Alan Rickman Alec Hopkins^{Y}	Alan Rickman	Alan Rickman	Alan Rickman Benedict Clarke^{Y}
Sorting Hat	Leslie Phillips^{V}	Leslie Phillips^{V}						Leslie Phillips^{V}
Dean Thomas	Alfred Enoch	Alfred Enoch	Alfred Enoch	Alfred Enoch	Alfred Enoch	Alfred Enoch		Alfred Enoch
Tom	Derek Deadman		Jim Tavare					
Lord Voldemort Tom Riddle	Richard Bremmer; Ian Hart^{V}	Christian Coulson^{Y}		Ralph Fiennes	Ralph Fiennes	Hero Fiennes-Tiffin^{Y} Frank Dillane^{Y} Ralph Fiennes^{A}	Ralph Fiennes	Ralph Fiennes
Fred Weasley	James Phelps	James Phelps	James Phelps	James Phelps	James Phelps	James Phelps	James Phelps	James Phelps
George Weasley	Oliver Phelps	Oliver Phelps	Oliver Phelps	Oliver Phelps	Oliver Phelps	Oliver Phelps	Oliver Phelps	Oliver Phelps
Ginny Weasley	Bonnie Wright	Bonnie Wright	Bonnie Wright	Bonnie Wright	Bonnie Wright	Bonnie Wright	Bonnie Wright	Bonnie Wright
Molly Weasley	Julie Walters	Julie Walters	Julie Walters		Julie Walters	Julie Walters	Julie Walters	Julie Walters
Percy Weasley	Chris Rankin	Chris Rankin	Chris Rankin		Chris Rankin			Chris Rankin
Ron Weasley	Rupert Grint	Rupert Grint	Rupert Grint	Rupert Grint	Rupert Grint	Rupert Grint	Rupert Grint	Rupert Grint
Oliver Wood	Sean Biggerstaff	Sean Biggerstaff						Sean Biggerstaff^{C}
=== Introduced in Chamber of Secrets ===
Hannah Abbott		Charlotte Skeoch		Charlotte Skeoch				
Aragog		Julian Glover^{V}						
Mr Borgin (Note: A scene with Mr Borgin was shot for Chamber of Secrets but was cut from the theatrical version.)		Edward Tudor-Pole^{E}						
Lavender Brown		Kathleen Cauley	Jennifer Smith			Jessie Cave	Jessie Cave	Jessie Cave
Colin Creevey		Hugh Mitchell						
Armando Dippet		Alfred Burke						
Dobby		Toby Jones^{V}					Toby Jones^{V}	
Justin Finch-Fletchley		Edward Randell						
Cornelius Fudge		Robert Hardy	Robert Hardy	Robert Hardy	Robert Hardy			
Mr Granger		Tom Knight					Ian Kelly	
Mrs Granger		Heather Bleasdale					Michelle Fairley	
Gilderoy Lockhart		Kenneth Branagh						
Lucius Malfoy		Jason Isaacs		Jason Isaacs	Jason Isaacs		Jason Isaacs	Jason Isaacs
Moaning Myrtle		Shirley Henderson		Shirley Henderson				
Irma Pince		Sally Mortemore						
Poppy Pomfrey		Gemma Jones				Gemma Jones		Gemma Jones
Pomona Sprout		Miriam Margolyes						Miriam Margolyes
Arthur Weasley		Mark Williams	Mark Williams	Mark Williams	Mark Williams	Mark Williams	Mark Williams	Mark Williams
=== Introduced in Prisoner of Azkaban ===
Sirius Black			Gary Oldman	Gary Oldman	Gary Oldman James Walters^{Y}			Gary Oldman Rohan Gotobed^{Y}
Sir Cadogan			Paul Whitehouse					
Marge Dursley			Pam Ferris					
Shrunken Head			Lenny Henry^{V}					
Remus Lupin			David Thewlis		David Thewlis James Utechin^{Y}	David Thewlis	David Thewlis	David Thewlis
Pansy Parkinson			Genevieve Gaunt			Scarlett Byrne	Scarlett Byrne	Scarlett Byrne
Parvati Patil			Sitara Shah	Shefali Chowdhury	Shefali Chowdhury	Shefali Chowdhury		
Peter Pettigrew			Timothy Spall	Timothy Spall	Timothy Spall Charles Hughes^{Y}	Timothy Spall	Timothy Spall	Timothy Spall^{A}
Ernie Prang			Jimmy Gardner					
Madam Rosmerta			Julie Christie					
Stan Shunpike			Lee Ingleby					
Sybill Trelawney			Emma Thompson		Emma Thompson			Emma Thompson
Bill Weasley			Richard Fish				Domhnall Gleeson	Domhnall Gleeson
Charlie Weasley			Alex Crockford					
=== Introduced in Goblet of Fire ===
Heathcote Barbary				Jason Buckle				
Frank Bryce				Eric Sykes				
Cho Chang				Katie Leung	Katie Leung	Katie Leung	Katie Leung	Katie Leung
Barty Crouch Jr				David Tennant				
Barty Crouch Sr				Roger Lloyd-Pack				
Gideon Crumb				Steven Claydon				
Roger Davies				Henry Lloyd-Hughes				
Fleur Delacour				Clémence Poésy			Clémence Poésy	Clémence Poésy
Gabrielle Delacour				Angelica Mandy				
Amos Diggory				Jeff Rawle				
Cedric Diggory (Note: Stuntman Joe Livermore played uncredited and unnamed Seeker of the Hufflepuff Quidditch team in Prisoner of Azkaban, labeled as "Diggory" in the film set call sheet.)				Robert Pattinson	Robert Pattinson^{A}			
Kirley Duke				Jonny Greenwood				
Igor Karkaroff				Predrag Bjelac				
Viktor Krum				Stanislav Ianevski			Stanislav Ianevski^{E}	
Olympe Maxime				Frances de la Tour			Frances de la Tour	
Alastor "Mad-Eye" Moody				Brendan Gleeson	Brendan Gleeson		Brendan Gleeson	
Padma Patil				Afshan Azad	Afshan Azad	Afshan Azad	Afshan Azad	Afshan Azad
Rita Skeeter				Miranda Richardson			Miranda Richardson	
Orsino Thruston				Philip Selway				
Donaghan Tremlett				Steve Mackey				
Myron Wagtail				Jarvis Cocker				
=== Introduced in Order of the Phoenix ===
Amelia Bones					Sian Thomas			
John Dawlish					Richard Leaf			
Elphias Doge					Peter Cartwright		David Ryall	
Aberforth Dumbledore					Jim McManus			Ciarán Hinds
Arabella Figg					Kathryn Hunter			
Grawp					Tony Maudsley			
Wilhelmina Grubbly-Plank					Apple Brook			
Mafalda Hopkirk					Jessica Hynes^{V}		Sophie Thompson	
Kreacher					Timothy Bateson^{V}		Simon McBurney^{V}	
Bellatrix Lestrange					Helena Bonham Carter	Helena Bonham Carter	Helena Bonham Carter	Helena Bonham Carter
Alice Longbottom					Lisa Wood			
Frank Longbottom					James Payton			
Luna Lovegood					Evanna Lynch	Evanna Lynch	Evanna Lynch	Evanna Lynch
Magorian					Michael Wildman			
Kingsley Shacklebolt					George Harris		George Harris	George Harris
Nymphadora Tonks					Natalia Tena	Natalia Tena	Natalia Tena	Natalia Tena
Dolores Umbridge					Imelda Staunton	Imelda Staunton^{V}^{A}	Imelda Staunton	
=== Introduced in Half-Blood Prince ===
Marcus Belby						Robert Knox (Note: Knox was stabbed to death on 24 May 2008 before Half-Blood Prince was released. The cast and crew of Half-Blood Prince wore white ribbons to the London premiere of the film in tribute to Knox.)		
Regulus Black						Tom Moorcroft		
Alecto Carrow						Suzie Toase	Suzie Toase	Suzie Toase
Amycus Carrow						Ralph Ineson	Ralph Ineson	Ralph Ineson
Fenrir Greyback						Dave Legeno	Dave Legeno	Dave Legeno
Leanne						Isabella Laughland	Isabella Laughland	Isabella Laughland
Narcissa Malfoy						Helen McCrory	Helen McCrory	Helen McCrory
Cormac McLaggen						Freddie Stroma	Freddie Stroma	Freddie Stroma
Horace Slughorn						Jim Broadbent		Jim Broadbent
Romilda Vane						Anna Shaffer	Anna Shaffer	Anna Shaffer
Eldred Worple						Paul Ritter		
Blaise Zabini						Louis Cordice	Louis Cordice	Louis Cordice
=== Introduced in Deathly Hallows – Part 1 ===
Bathilda Bagshot							Hazel Douglas	
Charity Burbage							Carolyn Pickles	
Mary Cattermole							Kate Fleetwood	
Reginald Cattermole							Steffan Rhodri	
Mundungus Fletcher							Andy Linden	
Gregorovitch							Rade Šerbedžija	
Gellert Grindelwald							Michael Byrne Jamie Campbell Bower^{Y}	
Xenophilius Lovegood							Rhys Ifans	
Auntie Muriel							Matyelok Gibbs	
Albert Runcorn							David O'Hara	
Scabior							Nick Moran	Nick Moran
Rufus Scrimgeour							Bill Nighy	
Pius Thicknesse							Guy Henry	Guy Henry
Corban Yaxley							Peter Mullan	
=== Introduced in Deathly Hallows – Part 2 ===
Bogrod								Jon Key
Ariana Dumbledore								Hebe Beardsall
Hugo Granger-Weasley								Ryan Turner
Rose Granger-Weasley								Helena Barlow
Astoria Greengrass								Jade Gordon
Scorpius Malfoy								Bertie Gilbert
Albus Severus Potter								Arthur Bowen
James Sirius Potter								Will Dunn
Lily Luna Potter								Daphne de Beistegui

== See also ==
- Wizarding World cast members
- Fantastic Beasts cast members
- List of Harry Potter (TV series) cast members
- List of Harry Potter and the Cursed Child cast members
