= Padfoot =

Padfoot may refer to:

- Black dog (folklore), one of many names for ghostly black dogs reported across the United Kingdom
- Sirius Black, a fictional character from the Harry Potter universe, who can transform into a black dog
