= Places in Harry Potter =

The fictional universe of Harry Potter contains numerous settings for the events in the novels, films and other media of the Harry Potter and the Fantastic Beasts series. These locations are divided into four main categories: residences, education, commerce, and government.

== Residences ==
=== The Burrow ===
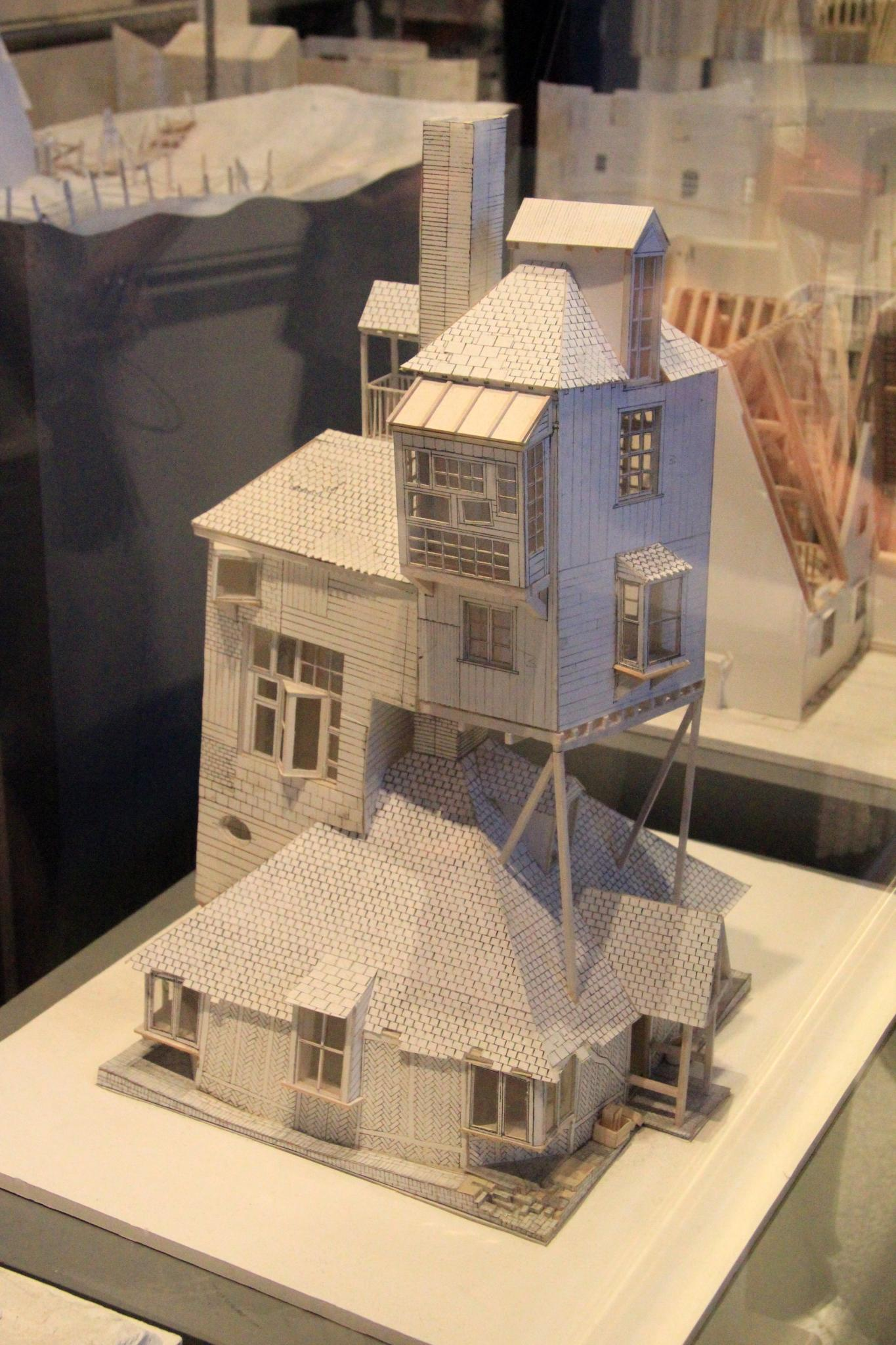
Scale model of The Burrow in The Making of Harry Potter exhibition

The home of the Weasley family is known as the Burrow. It is located outside the fictional village of Ottery St Catchpole in Devon, England, near the homes of the Lovegoods, the Diggorys and the Fawcetts. The Burrow is used as the headquarters of the Order of the Phoenix in Harry Potter and the Deathly Hallows The dilapidated house has seven floors and remains standing only through the use of magic. The protagonist visits the house in Harry Potter and the Chamber of Secrets for the first time. The house returns to be a part of the story in the following books.

=== Godric's Hollow ===
Godric's Hollow is a fictional West Country wizarding village where Lily and James Potter lived with their infant son Harry. (Note: Attributed to multiple references:) It has been a home to Albus Dumbledore, Bathilda Bagshot and Godric Gryffindor, after whom it was named. At the centre of the village square is a war memorial that magically transforms into a monument to the Potter family. At the end of the main street are the remains of Harry's old home. In Deathly Hallows, Harry discovers that the Godric's Hollow cemetery where his parents are buried also contains the grave of Ignotus Peverell.

=== Little Hangleton ===
Little Hangleton is a fictional Muggle village in the north of England, roughly two hundred miles from Little Whinging. It contains the graveyard where Voldemort is restored to bodily form in Goblet of Fire. On a hill above the village is the former estate of the Riddle family, where Voldemort killed his father, his grandparents and the Muggle gardener Frank Bryce. Also nearby is the former home of the Gaunt family.

=== Malfoy Manor ===
Malfoy Manor is the home of Lucius and Narcissa Malfoy and their son Draco. The novel Order of the Phoenix states that the manor is located in Wiltshire. In Deathly Hallows, Voldemort uses Malfoy Manor as his headquarters and imprisons Luna Lovegood, Dean Thomas, Mr. Ollivander and Griphook in the basement. When Snatchers capture Harry, Ron, and Hermione, they are also imprisoned in the manor. Some of the Malfoy Manor scenes in the Harry Potter films were shot at Hardwick Hall in Derbyshire.

=== Number 4, Privet Drive ===
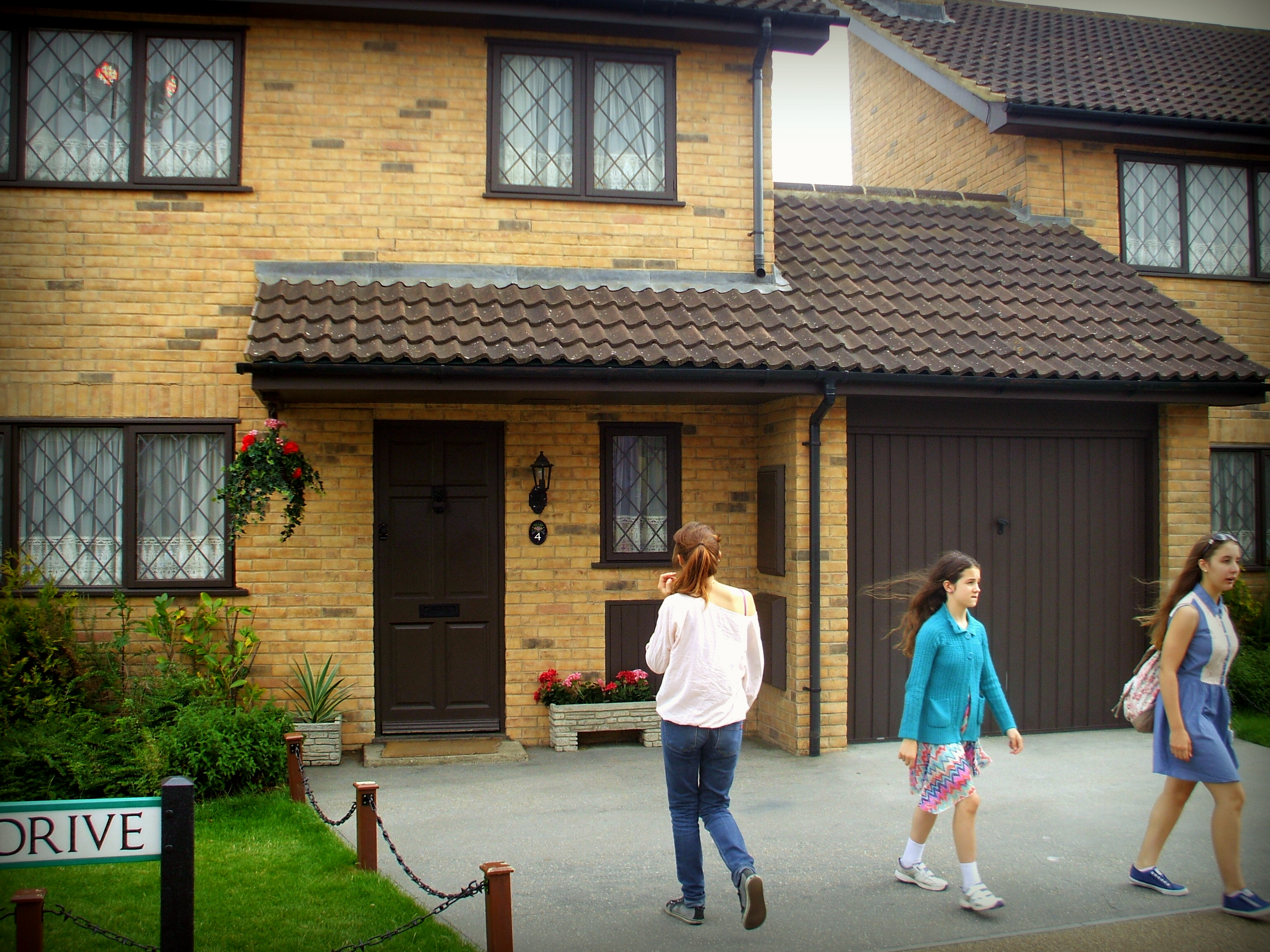
The set used for the Dursley home in the Harry Potter films

Harry is raised from infancy by his aunt Petunia Dursley and his uncle Vernon Dursley at Number 4, Privet Drive. The house is located in the fictional town of Little Whinging, which is south-west of London in the county of Surrey. Albus Dumbledore explains to Harry that when his mother sacrificed herself to save him, an ancient magic was created that protects Harry as long as he lives with Petunia, his mother's sister. Unbeknownst to Harry, his neighbour Arabella Figg is a Squib who was placed in Little Whinging by Dumbledore to keep an eye on Harry.

Scenes taking place at the Dursley residence in the film adaptation of Philosopher's Stone were filmed at 12 Picket Post Close in the town of Bracknell. Filming for subsequent films took place on a set at Leavesden Film Studios, near Watford, Hertfordshire that proved to be cheaper than filming on location.

=== Number 12, Grimmauld Place ===
Number 12, Grimmauld Place is the London home of the Black family. In the fifth novel, it is selected as the headquarters of the Order of the Phoenix. A house-elf named Kreacher inhabits the house. In Half-Blood Prince, Harry learns that he has inherited Number 12 from his deceased godfather Sirius Black, and he donates the property to the Order. In Deathly Hallows, the house becomes a sanctuary for Harry, Ron, and Hermione while they are hiding from Voldemort.

=== Shell Cottage ===
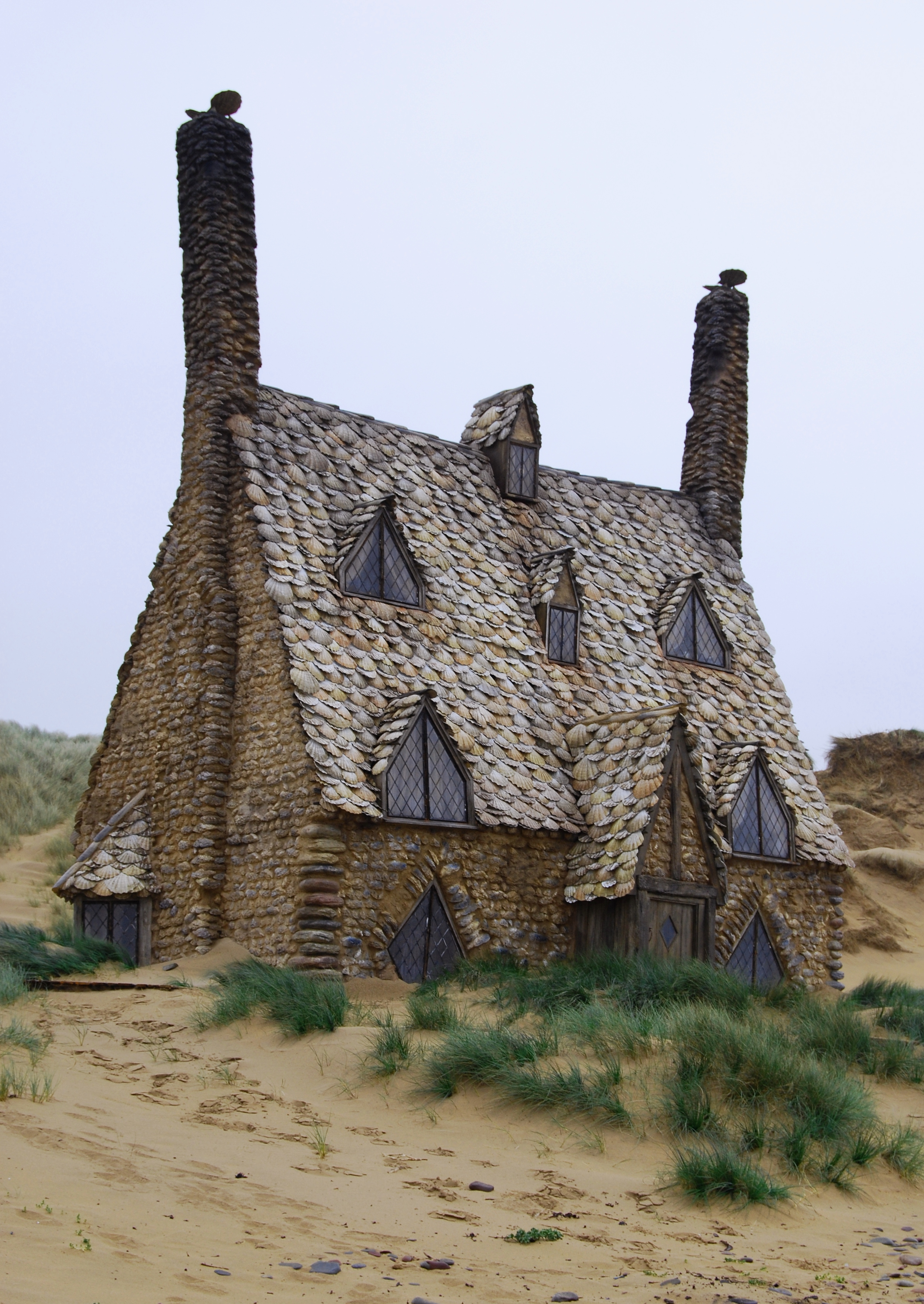
Shell Cottage as depicted in the Harry Potter films

Shell Cottage is the home of Bill Weasley and Fleur Delacour after they get married. It overlooks a beach outside the fictional village of Tinworth in Cornwall. The cottage serves as a hiding place for Harry and his companions after they escape from Malfoy Manor in Deathly Hallows. After Dobby dies, Harry buries him in the cottage's garden. The scenes set at Shell Cottage in the film adaptations of Deathly Hallows were shot on Freshwater West beach in Wales.

=== Spinner's End ===
The house of Severus Snape is located in a fictional Muggle town called Spinner's End. The town first appears in Half-Blood Prince when Snape is visited there by Bellatrix Lestrange and Narcissa Malfoy. In Deathly Hallows, it is revealed that Snape lived in Spinner's End as a child, and that Lily Potter and Petunia Dursley lived in the same town.

== Education ==
=== Beauxbatons ===
The Beauxbatons Academy of Magic is a French magic school. It is first introduced in Goblet of Fire when a delegation of students from Beauxbatons arrives at Hogwarts for the Triwizard Tournament. Beauxbatons is described as a boarding school located in the Pyrenees mountains. The school has a preponderance of French students, although students from Spain, Portugal, the Netherlands, Luxembourg and Belgium also attend in large numbers. The headmistress of Beauxbatons is Olympe Maxime, and the school's champion in the Triwizard Tournament is Fleur Delacour. In the film adaptation of Goblet of Fire, all Beauxbatons students are female, while in the novel the school is co-educational. Beauxbatons translates from French as "beautiful sticks".

The depiction of French students in the Harry Potter series has been described as stereotypical by several scholars. (Note: Attributed to multiple references:) Marek Oziewicz has called the Beauxbatons delegation "homogeneous" and lacking the cultural diversity of Hogwarts. Christina Flotmann claimed that the contrast depicted between Beauxbatons and Hogwarts functions as an allusion to a historical competition between the "sober and proper" England and the "immoral and decadent" France.

=== Castelobruxo ===
Castelobruxo ( /kæstɛloʊbruːʃuː/) is a Brazilian school of magic that specialises in Magizoology and Herbology. The exact location of the school is unknown, but it is said to appear to wizards as a golden temple, and to Muggles as nothing more than ruins. Castelobruxo is guarded by magical creatures called Caipora.

=== Durmstrang ===
Coat of arms of Durmstrang

The Durmstrang Institute for Magical Learning is a school that makes its first appearance in Goblet of Fire. Like Beauxbatons, Durmstrang sends a delegation of students to Hogwarts for the Triwizard Tournament. According to the Wizarding World website, Durmstrang is located in the "far Northern reaches of Europe". The school's headmaster is the former Death Eater Igor Karkaroff, and the novel reveals that Durmstrang students are instructed in the Dark Arts. Durmstrang is portrayed as an all-boys school in the film adaptation of Goblet of Fire, but is depicted as co-educational in the novel. In Deathly Hallows, it is revealed that the Dark wizard Gellert Grindelwald attended Durmstrang.

Several writers have commented on the depiction of the Durmstrang students. The British journalist Julia Eccleshare asserts that the Durmstrang delegation is depicted as dishonest and untrustworthy. Marek Oziewicz called Durmstrang a "medley of scary stereotypes" of Eastern Europe. Christina Flotmann wrote that the first appearance of the Durmstrang delegation links the school with "sinister literary tropes such as the Flying Dutchman." She also suggested that the name Durmstrang sounds dark and threatening. The name of the school is likely a play on the German phrase Sturm und Drang, meaning storm and stress. (Note: Attributed to multiple references:)

=== Hogwarts ===
Hogwarts School of Witchcraft and Wizardry is a British school of magic. It is the primary setting for the first six Harry Potter novels.

=== Ilvermorny ===
Ilvermorny School of Witchcraft and Wizardry is an American school of magic. It first appeared in a short story by J. K. Rowling in 2016, and was subsequently depicted in the film Fantastic Beasts and Where to Find Them. The school was founded in the seventeenth century by Isolt Sayre in Adams, Massachusetts. It is located on Mount Greylock and is concealed from non-magical people with enchantments. Like Hogwarts, Ilvermorny is divided into four houses. The Ilvermorny houses are Horned Serpent, Pukwudgie, Thunderbird and Wampus, each said to represent a different aspect of the ideal wizard.

=== Mahoutokoro ===
Mahoutokoro is the smallest wizarding school, and is located in Japan. Students wear enchanted robes which grow in size with the wearer. The robes change colour, from faint pink to gold, as the wearer increases their knowledge of magic. The students of Mahoutokoro are known for their academic prowess and skill at Quidditch. It is said that Quidditch was introduced to Japanese students when two Hogwarts students flew off-course during a typical flying routine.

=== Uagadou ===
According to the Wizarding World website, Uagadou is the oldest of several African wizarding schools, and the largest wizarding school in the world. It is located in the Mountains of the Moon in Uganda.

=== Koldovstoretz ===
Koldovstoretz is the Russian wizarding school.

== Commerce ==
=== Diagon Alley ===
Diagon Alley is a shopping district in London that is accessible to wizards, but hidden from Muggles. It contains Gringotts Wizarding Bank and various types of shops.

=== Hogsmeade ===
Hogsmeade Village, or simply Hogsmeade, is a wizarding village located near Hogwarts. It primarily consists of a single thoroughfare called High Street, which contains shops, cafés and pubs. Hogwarts students who are in their third year or above are permitted to visit Hogsmeade on certain weekends.

Places in Hogsmeade

- Dervish & Banges sells and repairs magical equipment.
- Gladrags Wizardwear is a clothing shop full of quirky merchandise, including a selection of strange and unusual socks.
- Honeydukes is a popular sweets shop. There is a secret passageway in the cellar that leads into Hogwarts.

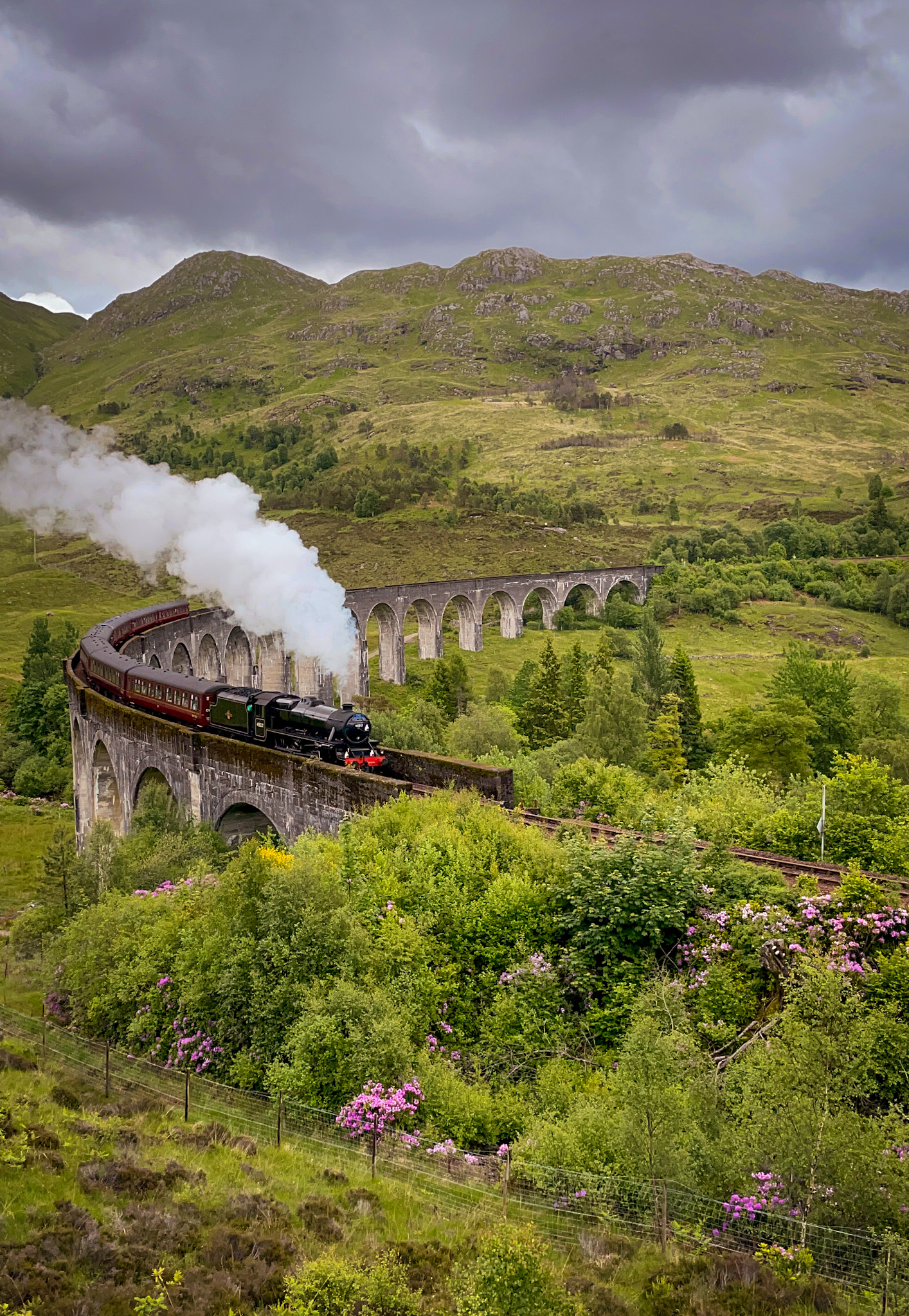
The Jacobite steam train crossing the Glenfinnan Viaduct in 2022

- Hogsmeade Station is a train station where the Hogwarts Express stops. Scenes depicting Hogsmeade Station in the Harry Potter films were filmed at Goathland railway station on the North Yorkshire Moors Railway. Extensive filming of the Hogwarts Express took place on the West Highland Line on the Glenfinnan Viaduct, located at Loch Shiel in Inverness-shire, Scotland.
- The Hog's Head is a filthy pub owned by Aberforth Dumbledore. A few months before Harry was born, Sybill Trelawney uttered a prophecy in The Hog's Head which connected Voldemort and Harry. In Order of the Phoenix, the first meeting of Dumbledore's Army is held at The Hog's Head. During Deathly Hallows, Aberforth reveals a secret passage in the pub that leads into Hogwarts.
- Madam Puddifoot's is a small teashop located on a side street. On Valentine's Day, floating cherubs throw pink confetti on visiting couples. In Order of the Phoenix, Harry and Cho Chang visit Madam Puddifoot's on Valentine's Day.
- Scrivenshaft's Quill Shop sells stationery items such as quills, ink, parchment and envelopes.
- The Shrieking Shack stands on the outskirts of Hogsmeade, with boarded-up windows and an overgrown garden. It was built as a hiding place for the werewolf Remus Lupin, then a Hogwarts student. He accessed the shack from a secret tunnel underneath the Whomping Willow on the Hogwarts grounds, and would stay there during his monthly transformations to avoid harming fellow students. Nearby villagers heard Lupin's howling and a rumour started that the shack was haunted by spirits.
- The Three Broomsticks is an inn and pub known for its delicious butterbeer.
- Zonko's Joke Shop sells joke and trick items.

=== Knockturn Alley ===
Knockturn Alley (Note: "Knockturn Alley" is a play on the word "nocturnally".) is described in the novels as a dark and seedy alleyway diagonal to Diagon Alley. Many of the shops in Knockturn Alley, such as Borgin and Burkes, are devoted to the Dark Arts. Objects that have appeared in Borgin and Burkes include a cursed opal necklace, a Hand of Glory, and a Vanishing Cabinet which is used by Draco Malfoy to infiltrate Hogwarts in Half-Blood Prince. Voldemort worked at Borgin and Burkes briefly during the 1940s. The shop is owned by Caractacus Burke and Mr. Borgin, though Mr. Borgin is the only owner to appear in the novels and films.

=== La Place Cachée ===
La Place Cachée or The Hidden Square, is a shopping district for wizards in Paris, near the River Seine. It is accessed via a portal in a brick pedestal under a verdigris bronze statue of a reclining woman. La Place Cachée appears in the film Fantastic Beasts: The Crimes of Grindelwald (2018).

=== The Leaky Cauldron ===
The Leaky Cauldron is described as a dark and shabby pub and inn, located on the Muggle street Charing Cross Road in London. It provides a way of entering Diagon Alley from the Muggle world. The rear of the pub opens onto a courtyard, in which a particular brick must be tapped three times to open a path to Diagon Alley.

=== Platform 9 ¾ ===
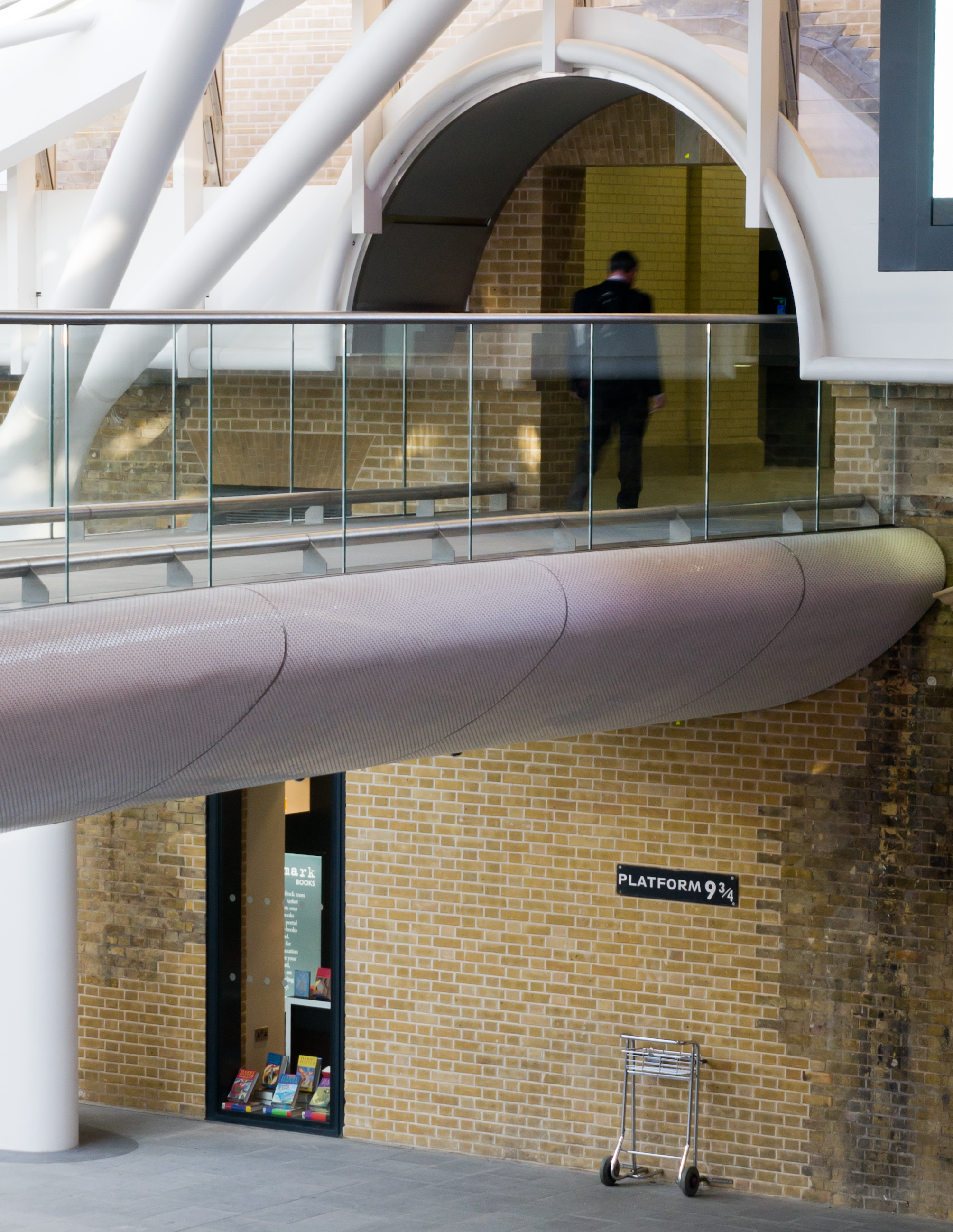
Following the success of Harry Potter, a sign reading "Platform 9¾ " was installed at London's King's Cross railway station.

The Hogwarts Express train departs from the fictional platform 9¾ at King's Cross railway station in central London. The platform is accessed by magically walking through a solid barrier between platforms 9 and 10. After the Harry Potter novels were published, Rowling found that she had confused the layout of King's Cross with that of Euston station. During production of the Harry Potter films, the St Pancras Renaissance London Hotel, which is part of St Pancras railway station, was used for King's Cross station.

A plaque depicting the supposed location Platform 9¾ was placed on a wall at King's Cross, along with a luggage trolley "stuck" halfway through the wall. A wrought-iron "Platform 9¾" gate used in the films is preserved at the National Railway Museum. After Alan Rickman's death in 2016, Harry Potter fans created a memorial to the actor at Platform 9¾. A Harry Potter–themed store is also located near the plaque.

There is a replica of King's Cross at The Wizarding World of Harry Potter themed area at Universal Orlando Resort. It features a wall between Platforms 9 and 10, which visitors can "walk through" to access Platform 9¾.

== Government ==
=== Azkaban ===
Azkaban is a prison for criminals of the British and Irish wizarding world. According to Half-Blood Prince, Azkaban is located somewhere in the North Sea. It is guarded by Dementors, which render the inmates incapable of happiness. According to Sirius Black, many inmates simply stop eating and eventually die of starvation. It was considered impossible to escape from Azkaban until Sirius managed to do it. Performing any of the Unforgivable Curses on a human is punishable by a life sentence in the prison, although there are occasions when Aurors are allowed to perform those curses. Following Voldemort's demise, Kingsley Shacklebolt becomes Minister of Magic and ends the use of Dementors at Azkaban.

=== Erkstag ===
The Erkstag is a prison in Berlin that is supposedly closed, but is secretly being operated. It appears as a vast underground quarry with a spiral walkway leading down into its depths. It is inhabited by an enormous mother manticore who dissolves the bodies of prisoners and feeds them to her thousands of offspring.

=== Magical Congress of the United States of America ===
The Magical Congress of the United States of America (MACUSA) first appeared in the 2016 film Fantastic Beasts and Where To Find Them. It is the entity that governs the wizarding population of the United States, and is led by a President. It is located in a tower in the wizarding world—all within the same footprint as the Woolworth Building in Lower Manhattan, New York City—but is far larger on the inside, with a vast atrium and extensive basement levels.

=== Ministry of Magic ===
The Ministry of Magic is the government of the wizarding community of Britain and Ireland. The Fantastic Beasts series introduces a French and German Ministry of Magic, located in Paris and Berlin respectively.

=== Nurmengard Castle ===
Nurmengard is a prison that the Dark wizard Gellert Grindelwald built to incarcerate Muggles and enemies. After Albus Dumbledore defeated Grindelwald, the prisoners were released and Grindelwald himself was imprisoned in the top-most cell. In Deathly Hallows, Voldemort arrives at Nurmengard seeking information about the Elder Wand. When Grindelwald refuses to tell him anything, Voldemort kills him.

=== St Mungo's Hospital for Magical Maladies and Injuries ===
Located in London, St Mungo's Hospital treats witches and wizards who have suffered magical injuries or are infected by magical diseases. It also acts as a long-term asylum for those permanently disabled by magic or suffering from dangerous conditions, and it prevents them from being exposed to Muggles.
