= Bartemius Crouch =

Bartemius Crouch may refer to:

- Bartemius Crouch Sr., a fictional politician in the Harry Potter series
- Barty Crouch Jr., Death Eater, son of the above character.
