= Bellatrix Lestrange =

Harry Potter character

- Harry Potter character
- Helena Bonham Carter as Bellatrix in Harry Potter and the Deathly Hallows – Part 2
- First appearance: Harry Potter and the Goblet of Fire (2000)
- Created by: J. K. Rowling
- Portrayed by: Helena Bonham Carter
- Voiced by: Beth Chalmers (Note: Various video games); Eiry Hughes (Note: Harry Potter for Xbox 360 Kinect (video game))

In-universe information
- Occupation: Death Eater
- Family: Cygnus Black (father); Druella Rosier (mother); Andromeda Tonks (sister); Narcissa Malfoy (sister)
- Spouse: Rodolphus Lestrange (husband)
- Relatives: Sirius Black (cousin); Lucius Malfoy (brother-in-law); Draco Malfoy (nephew); Nymphadora Tonks (niece)
- Nationality: British
- House: Slytherin
- Born: 1951
- Died: 2 May 1998 (aged 46-47)

Bellatrix Lestrange is a fictional character in the Harry Potter novels by J. K. Rowling. She evolved from an unnamed peripheral character in Harry Potter and the Goblet of Fire into an antagonist in subsequent novels. In the final novel, Rowling established her as Lord Voldemort's "last, best lieutenant". Bellatrix had a fanatical obsession with the Dark Lord, though she feared his magical abilities and absolute power over his forces. She is sadistic and homicidal, with a psychotic personality.

She is played by Helena Bonham Carter in the last four Harry Potter films, from Order of the Phoenix (2007) to Deathly Hallows – Part 2 (2011).

== Name ==
Her given name comes from Latin as the feminine form of the noun "warrior". Like many members of the Black family, Bellatrix is named after a celestial body or astronomic structure, in this case one of the brightest stars in the constellation Orion.

Bellatrix's name has been translated into other languages in various ways. Many of the changes accentuate her evil nature, such as the Dutch "Bellatrix van Detta".

== Character background ==
Bellatrix has two younger sisters, Andromeda and Narcissa, and is a first cousin of Sirius Black. She married Rodolphus Lestrange after leaving Hogwarts "because it was expected of her" to marry a pure-blood. However, Rowling stated in an interview that Bellatrix truly loved Voldemort. Andromeda married a Muggle-born, Ted Tonks, and was subsequently disowned by the Blacks, whereas Narcissa, conversely, married Lucius Malfoy, heir of a wealthy pure-blood family; thus, Bellatrix is the aunt of both Nymphadora Tonks and Draco Malfoy.

At Hogwarts, she, along with her sisters, was sorted into Slytherin. It is suggested in the novels that, as a student, Bellatrix associated with a group of students – including Rodolphus Lestrange, Severus Snape, Avery, Evan Rosier and Wilkes – who nearly all became Death Eaters. It is assumed Bellatrix was at least initially drawn to Lord Voldemort because they both believe in an ideology that favors pure-blood wizards over other wizards. This elitism, shared by the Malfoy and Lestrange clans, was instilled in Bellatrix since childhood. The Black family motto, toujours pur (French for "always pure"), reflects this steadfast belief in blood purity. Bellatrix and her husband were active Death Eaters during Voldemort's rise to power, and evaded capture and suspicion until after his downfall.

== Appearances ==
=== Harry Potter and the Goblet of Fire ===
Said book uses Albus Dumbledore's Pensieve as a plot device to reveal that Bellatrix (although she is not called by name), rather than deserting her leader like many other Death Eaters, was part of the group of dark wizards – along with Rodolphus, Rabastan, and Barty Crouch Jr – that tortured well-known aurors Frank and Alice Longbottom to try to gain information about Voldemort's location. For using the Unforgivable Cruciatus Curse to torture the Longbottoms until they went insane, Bellatrix and her three associates were sentenced to life imprisonment in Azkaban. At her trial, Bellatrix proudly and defiantly proclaimed that Voldemort would rise again. Later in that book, during his rebirthing ritual, Voldemort stated that the Lestranges were amongst the most faithful members of his inner circle.

=== Harry Potter and the Order of the Phoenix ===
Thirteen years after Voldemort's fall, Bellatrix was one of many Death Eaters who escaped Azkaban and rejoined him. After escaping, she was at the Battle of the Department of Mysteries in the climax of the book, in which a group of Death Eaters tried to steal Sybill Trelawney's prophecy about Voldemort's downfall. Neville Longbottom attempts to kill Bellatrix, who is with Lucius and other Death Eaters to confront Harry. Rowling let Bellatrix prove her magical prowess during the mission when she overpowered her niece Tonks and Kingsley Shacklebolt in one-on-one duels, killed her cousin Sirius by blasting him through a veil in the Death Chamber, and deflected one of Dumbledore's spells as she made her escape. Harry tried to use the Cruciatus Curse on her in revenge for killing Sirius, but the curse was ineffective due to the lack of real cruelty behind it. Before she could do any more, Bellatrix was joined by her master, who ignored her warning that Dumbledore was in the building. Bellatrix was subdued by Dumbledore in the Ministry of Magic's Atrium while he duelled Voldemort. Voldemort interceded on Bellatrix's behalf, grabbing her and taking her with him as he Disapparated, though not before being glimpsed by Ministry officials.

=== Harry Potter and the Half-Blood Prince ===
At the beginning of Half-Blood Prince, Bellatrix tries to keep Narcissa from confiding Draco's secret mission to Snape at Spinner's End. That conversation also suggests that Bellatrix mistrusts Snape not only because of his low birth, but also for many valid questions about his loyalty to the Dark Lord. Snape surprises Bellatrix by replying to each of her arguments and by agreeing to create an Unbreakable Vow with Narcissa to assist Draco in his mission to kill Dumbledore. Later in the book, it is mentioned by Snape that Bellatrix had been teaching Occlumency to Draco, in an effort to aid him with his mission. In the film, she and Fenrir Greyback arrive at the Burrow, the Weasleys' home, and burn it down. Ginny Weasley and Harry chase after them, with Bellatrix taunting them over her murder of Sirius.

=== Harry Potter and the Deathly Hallows ===
Chapter 1 of Deathly Hallows, Voldemort makes fun of the fact that her niece Tonks married werewolf Remus Lupin. Voldemort gives Bellatrix a chance to "prune" her family tree during the Death Eaters' attempt to capture Harry as the boy leaves the Dursleys' home, during which Bellatrix unsuccessfully tries to kill Tonks. Said book reveals that Bellatrix is the guardian of Helga Hufflepuff's cup (though she is unaware that it is a Horcrux), which Voldemort has entrusted the Lestranges to keep in their Gringotts vault. Bellatrix and the Malfoys detain Harry, Ron Weasley, and Hermione Granger at Malfoy Manor; and Hermione is tortured by Bellatrix when she suspects the trio has broken into her vault; but Dobby appears and saves the prisoners, though not before being hit by a knife thrown by Bellatrix as they disapparate to safety. Later in the book, Harry, Ron, and Hermione use a stray hair of Bellatrix's to disguise Hermione as Bellatrix using Polyjuice Potion, to gain access to the Lestrange's Gringotts vault. Though Voldemort apparently punishes Bellatrix and the Malfoys severely for interrupting his Elder Wand side quest only to have Potter escape and steal the cup, she nevertheless fights for her master in the Battle of Hogwarts towards the end of the novel. When the battle resumes inside the Great Hall after Harry's supposed death, Bellatrix simultaneously duels with Hermione, Ginny, and Luna Lovegood, none of whom is a match for Bellatrix, who nearly hits Ginny with a Killing Curse. An enraged Molly Weasley engages Bellatrix in a duel and fires a curse that hits Bellatrix right over the heart, killing her. Rowling revealed that, though there was speculation that Neville would kill Bellatrix, she had always intended Molly to do so because the author wanted to match Bellatrix's obsessive love with Molly's maternal love.

== Appearances in other media ==
The play Harry Potter and the Cursed Child, which happens over 19 years after The Deathly Hallows, reveals that Bellatrix is the mother of Delphini (Delphi for short), the play's female antagonist. Bellatrix conceived Delphi with Voldemort during their stay at Malfoy Manor prior to the Battle of Hogwarts.

== Production ==
Actress Helen McCrory was originally cast as Bellatrix in Harry Potter and the Order of the Phoenix but dropped out due to pregnancy and was replaced with Helena Bonham Carter. McCrory was later cast as Bellatrix's sister Narcissa in Harry Potter and the Half-Blood Prince, during the filming of which Bonham Carter learned that she was pregnant. Elizabeth Hurley was also reportedly linked to the role of Bellatrix at one point. While filming the scene in the Department of Mysteries in Order of the Phoenix, Bonham Carter accidentally perforated the eardrum of Matthew Lewis, the actor who portrays Neville Longbottom, with her wand during one of the outtakes, when she became a bit too enthusiastic in her portrayal.

== Reception ==
Helena Bonham Carter's performance as Bellatrix throughout the film series has been widely praised.
