= Sirius Black =

Fictional character in J. K. Rowling's Harry Potter novels

- Harry Potter character
- Gary Oldman as Sirius Black
- First appearance: Harry Potter and the Prisoner of Azkaban (1999)
- Created by: J. K. Rowling
- Portrayed by: Gary Oldman; James Walters (teenager)
- Voiced by: David Robb (Note: Prisoner of Azkaban (video game) Order of the Phoenix (video game)); Guy Harris (Note: Lego Harry Potter: Years 1–4); Dominic Rowan (Note: Harry Potter for Kinect)

In-universe information
- Alias: Padfoot
- Affiliation: Order of the Phoenix
- Family: Regulus Black (brother)
- Relatives: Harry Potter (godson); Bellatrix Lestrange (cousin); Narcissa Malfoy (cousin); Nymphadora Tonks (cousin)
- Nationality: British
- House: Gryffindor
- Born: 3 November 1959
- Died: 18 June 1996

Sirius Black is a fictional character in the Harry Potter series of novels by J. K. Rowling. Sirius was first mentioned briefly in Harry Potter and the Philosopher's Stone as a wizard who lent Rubeus Hagrid a flying motorbike shortly after Lord Voldemort killed James and Lily Potter. His character becomes prominent in Harry Potter and the Prisoner of Azkaban, in which he is the titular prisoner, and is also revealed to be the godfather of the central character Harry Potter. He is portrayed in the film adaptations by Gary Oldman.

== Character background ==
Sirius Black is the last heir of the House of Black, a once notable Pure-blood Wizarding family. His parents, Orion and Walburga Black, were both Blacks by birth and second cousins. Sirius had a younger brother, Regulus Arcturus Black, and three older cousins: Bellatrix Lestrange, Andromeda Tonks (his favourite cousin and mother of Nymphadora Tonks), and Narcissa Malfoy (mother of Draco Malfoy). In line with the Black family tradition of naming children after stars and constellations, Sirius was named after the Dog Star. Sirius's early life proved unhappy; he had come to hate most of his relatives, in particular his mother. He rejected his family's pure-blood elitism and reverence for the Dark Arts. At Hogwarts, rather than be sorted into Slytherin like the rest of his family, Sirius was placed in Gryffindor.

In contrast to his home life, Sirius greatly enjoyed life at Hogwarts, where he was inseparable from his best friend, James Potter. Sirius and James were immensely popular and known for their exceptionally good looks. Students liked his biting humour, and teachers respected his intelligence, though not his behaviour. His popularity was not universal, as a mutual hatred sprang up between James and Severus Snape. Sirius actively supported James, leading to Snape developing an equal and lifelong loathing of Sirius. Sirius and James often went out of their way to bully Snape, whom they despised for his great interest in the Dark Arts. They also became best friends with Peter Pettigrew and Remus Lupin, whom they later discovered was a werewolf. To support Remus, Sirius, James, and Peter secretly became Animagi, which allowed them to safely accompany Remus during his transformations and keep him under control. Sirius's form is that of a huge black dog, from which his nickname Padfoot was derived.

Sirius ran away from home at the age of sixteen and took refuge with James and his parents. His outraged mother burned his name off the family tree. Sirius's Uncle Alphard left him a large inheritance, causing Sirius's mother to also remove Alphard's name. He was left financially independent by his uncle's generous bequest. After leaving school, Sirius fought against Voldemort, eventually joining the Order of the Phoenix. He remained close friends with James and eventually attended James and Lily Evans' (now Lily Potter) wedding as their best man. When their son, Harry, was born, Lily and James named Sirius as Harry's godfather.

When the Potters became aware that Harry was Voldemort's specific target, Albus Dumbledore advised them to go into hiding using the Fidelius Charm, a highly complex spell allowing a secret to be concealed within another person. Trusting Sirius above all of their other friends, Lily and James wanted him to be their Secret Keeper. Sirius, however, worried that Voldemort would immediately suspect him of being the Potters' Secret Keeper and would target him; so he convinced the Potters to reassign Pettigrew as their Secret Keeper because he did not believe Voldemort would ever suspect a "weak, talentless thing" like Pettigrew. As it turned out, Pettigrew was Voldemort's spy within the Order. He betrayed the Potters to Voldemort, who subsequently tracked them down and murdered them.

After giving his motorbike to Hagrid so that Hagrid could deliver Harry to the Dursleys, Sirius then tracked down Pettigrew, determined to kill him in revenge. However, Pettigrew outwitted him: confronted by Sirius on a city street, he created an explosion, faking his own death (leaving a severed finger behind as evidence) and killing twelve Muggles in the process. Sirius was arrested, accused of murdering Pettigrew and the Muggles and of serving Voldemort, and was promptly thrown in prison by Barty Crouch, Sr. without receiving a trial. He spent the next twelve years in Azkaban, brooding over his friends' deaths and obsessing over Pettigrew's betrayal. Sirius states that, unlike most other Azkaban prisoners (who often became insane during their terms of imprisonment), he was able to keep his sanity because he knew he was innocent, and also used his Animagus form to ward off the Dementors, who are unable to perceive unsophisticated canine minds.

== Appearances ==
=== Harry Potter and the Prisoner of Azkaban ===
Twelve years into his sentence, Sirius sees a picture of the Weasley family on the front cover of the Daily Prophet. He notices the pet rat Scabbers perched on Ron Weasley's shoulder. This serves as a turning point in the series and sets the events of the third novel in motion, as Sirius immediately recognises Scabbers as Pettigrew's Animagus form. He realises that stationed at Hogwarts, Pettigrew will easily be able to deliver Harry to Voldemort should Voldemort ever regain power. This knowledge clears his mind and gives him the mental strength to escape Azkaban. He is the first person known to have escaped the wizard prison by his own means, accomplishing this feat by transforming into his Animagus dog form. The dementors' inability to detect Animagi, along with his severe weight loss from malnutrition, allows him to slip through his cell bars. After his escape, Sirius takes refuge in and around Hogsmeade, intent on exacting revenge upon Pettigrew and remaining near Harry. Knowing that the dementors have been stationed around Hogsmeade and at Hogwarts, Sirius remains in his Animagus form during this time, and is able to enter the Hogwarts grounds without being recognised by the dementors. Harry catches several glimpses of Sirius in his dog form and mistakenly believes him to be the Grim. He befriends Hermione Granger's cat Crookshanks, who is aware that Sirius is not actually a dog and who recognises Pettigrew for what he really is. Sirius breaks into Gryffindor Tower at one point with a knife, looking for Pettigrew, having had Crookshanks obtain Neville Longbottom's list of the dorm passwords, and shreds Ron's curtains after finding Pettigrew gone, due to Pettigrew having faked his death and framed Crookshanks. After Harry's broom is destroyed by the Whomping Willow during a Quidditch match invaded by Dementors, Sirius anonymously sends Harry a Firebolt as a Christmas gift, although it is confiscated by Professor McGonagall on suspicion that the broom is jinxed.

Towards the end of the novel, Harry, Ron, and Hermione confront Sirius, and Harry nearly kills him; however, Lupin's timely intervention stops Harry. Lupin, who has learned that Sirius is innocent, is reunited in friendship with him. Pettigrew is unmasked, and, most importantly, Harry stops Sirius and Lupin from murdering Pettigrew, arguing that his father would not want his friends to commit murder. Harry begins to view Sirius as a surrogate father, although events swiftly turn against him again – Pettigrew escapes, and Sirius is captured by the dementors at Hogwarts and sentenced to the Dementor's Kiss, a fate worse than death. Harry and Hermione help him escape with Buckbeak, a hippogriff who had also been unjustly condemned. Sirius is once again a wanted man.

=== Harry Potter and the Goblet of Fire ===
Sirius flees Europe to escape from the Ministry of Magic. There, he slowly recovers from his years in Azkaban and regains his health. Although he can only communicate sparingly with Harry by owl post, he gives Harry reasoned and sensible advice. Harry grows closer to Sirius and relies on his help. Sirius, worried, returns to Britain when Harry tells him that his scar has begun hurting him again (a signal of Voldemort's presence), and when there are reports of Death Eater activities at the Quidditch World Cup. He sacrifices some of his regained health to help Harry; by the time he reaches Hogsmeade, he is once again gaunt and dishevelled, hiding in a cave with Buckbeak and surviving mainly on rats (with occasional gifts of food from Harry, Ron, and Hermione). He is later summoned to Hogwarts by Dumbledore and listens to Harry's re-telling of Voldemort's rebirth. Dumbledore tasks him with alerting Lupin, Arabella Figg, Mundungus Fletcher, and other members of the Order of the Phoenix, and is instructed by Dumbledore to lie low at Lupin's for a while. Sirius reassures Harry, who does not want him to leave, that they will see each other again soon and then departs.

=== Harry Potter and the Order of the Phoenix ===
Sirius takes refuge in his family home at Number 12, Grimmauld Place. As the last Black, Sirius inherits the property and allows it to be used as the Order headquarters, although it has fallen into disrepair. Due to the ongoing manhunt, Sirius is confined there. His confinement causes depression, and he is frequently withdrawn and antagonistic – especially so by Snape's increasingly important role within the Order. The hostility between himself and Kreacher, his demented house-elf, also affects him, and he is consistently hateful towards Kreacher. When he briefly leaves the house to see Harry off to Hogwarts, his Animagus form is recognised by Draco and Lucius Malfoy, resulting in more threats and warnings. Harry and Sirius stay in touch through owls and the Floo Network, a system to communicate through fireplaces. Sirius is nearly captured by Dolores Umbridge, a Ministry official who is monitoring the Network and the owl mail in and out of Hogwarts. Near the middle of the novel, a large number of Death Eaters, including Sirius's cousin Bellatrix, escape Azkaban. The Ministry, which refuses to accept that Voldemort has returned and that the dementors have joined him, tries to blame Sirius, stating that he helped the prisoners escape and is leading them.

Sirius encourages Harry to oppose Umbridge and her reforms and strongly approves of Harry starting the secret defensive tutorial group for students, Dumbledore's Army. He also willingly answers Harry's questions about the Order and Voldemort. Lupin and Molly Weasley express disapproval for Sirius's behaviour around Harry, stating that Sirius treats his godson as if he is James, Harry's father, and that this is inappropriate.

Voldemort plants a false vision in Harry's mind that shows Sirius being tortured at the Department of Mysteries. Harry and his friends rush to the Department, where they are ambushed by Death Eaters. Meanwhile, Snape alerts the Order that the students have gone to the Ministry. The Order immediately sends a rescue team including Remus Lupin, Nymphadora Tonks, Alastor Moody, and Kingsley Shacklebolt. Sirius, desperate for any time out of his confinement, comes along too.

The Order battles the Death Eaters in the Department of Mysteries. During a frenzied duel with Bellatrix, Sirius taunts her for failing to harm him. Bellatrix strikes Sirius with a curse, sending him backwards into the veil and to his death. Later, Dumbledore persuades the Minister that Sirius is innocent. By the following book, Sirius is exonerated. Dumbledore refers to this as "a brutal ending to what was going to be a long and happy relationship". Harry is left to mourn Sirius, reflecting that, despite his flaws, he was a loving and protective godfather, and the closest thing Harry had ever had to a real parent. Harry inherits all of Sirius's possessions, including the house at Grimmauld Place, the house-elf Kreacher, and Buckbeak the Hippogriff.

=== Harry Potter and the Deathly Hallows ===
Sirius makes his final appearance in Harry Potter and the Deathly Hallows when Harry discovers the Resurrection Stone within the golden snitch. Appearing as a ghostly figure alongside Lily, James, and Lupin, Sirius supports Harry's walk into death and assures him that dying is "Quicker and easier than falling asleep." He also promises Harry that the four will always remain a part of him.

Rowling revealed a family tree in the J. K. Rowling Documentary on ITV concerning all of the grandchildren of the Weasley family. In this family tree, it is known that Harry named his first son James Sirius, after his father and godfather.

=== Harry Potter prequel ===
Sirius and James are the protagonists of an 800-word story set three years before Harry's birth. The two friends are riding Sirius's motorbike and are chased by two Muggle policemen for breaking the speed limit. The policemen attempt to arrest them when three Death Eaters on broomsticks fly down towards them. Sirius and James use the police car as a barrier, and the Death Eaters crash into it. In the end, they escape from the policemen flying on the motorbike.

== Portrayal in films ==
Sirius is portrayed by Gary Oldman in the Harry Potter film adaptations. Oldman revealed that he accepted the part because he needed the money, as he had not taken on any major work in several years in order to spend more time with his family. The actor compared Sirius to John Lennon, and also said he was "surprised by how difficult it was to pull off", comparing the role to Shakespearean dialogue. Oldman suggested Sirius' hairstyle, while Alfonso Cuarón, the director of the third film, designed his tattoos. He had read the first book, and his children were fans of the series. The part made Oldman a hero with his children and their schoolmates. Oldman said about his work in the Harry Potter films that he has "...done so much R-rated work, it's nice to have a job you can show your kids". Oldman was not aware of the character's early death when he took on the role, and has said that had he known, he would have approached the role differently.

Though Sirius appears several times during Goblet of Fire, the character appears very briefly in the film adaptation, in an expository scene in the Gryffindor common room's fireplace, with Oldman providing the voice. Oldman appears again in Order of the Phoenix. It has been stated that Oldman and Daniel Radcliffe became very close during the filming of the series. Sirius as a teenager also made a brief appearance in Order of the Phoenix, played by James Walters.

Just as in the book, Sirius returns via the Resurrection Stone in The Deathly Hallows – Part 2 alongside James, Lily, and Remus right before Harry enters the Forbidden Forest to face Voldemort. The character is referenced for the final time in the last scene, where it is revealed that Harry and Ginny's first born son was named after both James and Sirius.

== Characterisation ==
=== Outward appearance ===
Sirius is described as a tall man with long, black hair and grey eyes. Several times during the series, Sirius is stated to be very good-looking and "carelessly handsome" prior to his imprisonment; Harry also noted that as a teenager, Sirius always had a slightly spoiled, haughty look on his face. His long years in Azkaban made his face gaunt, and lack of grooming resulted in long, dirty hair and yellow teeth. Harry's first impression of Sirius is of a corpse.

=== Personality ===
As a student at Hogwarts, Sirius was well-known for being a troublemaker, and once mentioned to Harry that he, James, Lupin, and Pettigrew "were all idiots". He said he was not appointed a prefect because he spent too much time in detention with James. Sirius is protective of Harry, but also encourages him to take unwise risks and sometimes – inappropriately – acts with him as he used to with James. On this, the author commented that "what Harry craves is a father." Rowling has stated that though she likes Sirius, "I do not think he is wholly wonderful." According to her, despite being brave and loyal, Sirius is also reckless, embittered, and "slightly unbalanced by his long stay in Azkaban." When asked if Harry has a godmother, Rowling replied that "Sirius was always too busy being a big rebel to get married."

Unlike his parents and brother, Sirius detested the Dark Arts and did not believe in the so-called purity of blood. Rowling has said that Sirius has also proven to "be very good at spouting bits of excellent personal philosophy, but he does not always live up to them". This primarily has to do with his treatment of Kreacher the house-elf; because Kreacher was a reminder to Sirius of the home he had always hated (and also due to Kreacher's parading of the attitudes and views of Sirius's parents), Sirius is hateful to Kreacher and consistently mistreats him. This, in turn, comes back to haunt him, as Kreacher eventually betrays Sirius to Voldemort, leading to Sirius's death. Rowling has also stated that, unlike Lupin, who is the same age as Sirius and appears more mature in nature, Sirius never really grew up, as he was placed in Azkaban during his early twenties and therefore had not had a very normal adult life. Despite all of this, Rowling states that Sirius's "redeeming quality is the affection that he is capable of feeling. He loved James like a brother and went on to transfer this attachment to Harry."

== Reception ==
Writers at IGN said that Sirius has an "edgy, rebellious appeal" and a "truly badass vibe at times". They said that what most appeals to them about the character is the father-son relationship that begins to form between him and Harry before Sirius's death.

== Cultural impact ==
In January 2006, Rowling donated a hand-drawn version of the Black family tree to a Book Aid International charity auction. The tree shows the members of the ancient Black family and their links by marriage to a number of other wizard families that appear in the novels. The tree was purchased for £30,000 on behalf of Daniel Radcliffe, who plays Harry Potter in the film series.
