= Harry Potter and the Goblet of Fire =

2000 fantasy novel by J. K. Rowling

- Cover art of the original UK edition
- Author: J. K. Rowling
- Illustrator: Giles Greenfield (first edition)
- Language: English
- Series: Harry Potter
- Release number: 4th in series
- Genre: Fantasy
- Publisher: Bloomsbury (UK)
- Publication date: 8 July 2000
- Publication place: United Kingdom
- Pages: 636 (first edition)
- ISBN: 0-7475-5079-4
- Preceded by: Harry Potter and the Prisoner of Azkaban
- Followed by: Harry Potter and the Order of the Phoenix

Harry Potter and the Goblet of Fire is a fantasy novel by British author J. K. Rowling. It is the fourth novel in the Harry Potter series. It follows Harry Potter, a wizard in his fourth year at Hogwarts School of Witchcraft and Wizardry, and the mystery surrounding the entry of Harry's name into the Triwizard Tournament, in which he is forced to compete.

The book was published in the United Kingdom by Bloomsbury and in the United States by Scholastic. In both countries, the release date was 8 July 2000. This was the first time a book in the series was published in both countries at the same time. The novel won a Hugo Award, the only Harry Potter novel to do so, in 2001. The book was adapted into a film, released worldwide on 18 November 2005, and a video game by Electronic Arts.

== Plot ==
During the summer, there is an attack at the Quidditch World Cup. The cloaked assailants resemble Death Eaters, the followers of Voldemort. When the school term begins at Hogwarts, Alastor "Mad-Eye" Moody is introduced as the new Defence Against the Dark Arts professor. Dumbledore announces that students from the foreign wizarding schools Beauxbatons and Durmstrang will be arriving at Hogwarts to participate in the Triwizard Tournament. Students who meet the age requirement are invited to enter themselves in the tournament by putting their names into an artefact called the Goblet of Fire. Although Harry does not nominate himself, he is mysteriously selected to compete against the older students Cedric Diggory, Fleur Delacour and Viktor Krum.

Harry is interviewed by the Daily Prophet reporter Rita Skeeter, who writes a scathing article portraying him as a disturbed attention-seeker. Using the Hogwarts Floo Network, Harry speaks with his godfather Sirius Black, who warns him about Durmstrang's headmaster Igor Karkaroff, who is a former Death Eater. Sirius believes that Harry's selection for the dangerous tournament is somehow connected to the attack at the World Cup. Hagrid alerts Harry that the First Task involves a dragon. After Moody reminds Harry that he is an expert flyer, Harry uses his broomstick to fly past the dragon and accomplish the task.

As Christmas approaches, Harry asks a girl named Cho Chang to the Yule Ball, but she is already going with Cedric. Harry and Ron end up going to the ball with the twin sisters Parvati and Padma Patil. Ron is sullen as he observes Hermione dancing with Krum. As the Second Task nears, Harry learns that he will need to rescue someone from the lake. The house-elf Dobby gives him Gillyweed, which allows him to breathe underwater long enough to rescue both Ron and Fleur's sister Gabrielle. He is awarded extra points for his bravery and is tied for first place.

In the Third Task, Harry and his competitors must navigate a maze of obstacles to reach the Triwizard Cup. Harry and Cedric reach the Cup at the same time and decide to grab it together. They are immediately transported to a graveyard, where Peter Pettigrew kills Cedric and subdues Harry. Using Harry's blood, he performs a rite that returns Voldemort to bodily form. As Voldemort and Harry duel, their wands magically connect. This distraction allows Harry the chance to escape back to Hogwarts with the Cup and Cedric's body.

Dumbledore, McGonagall, and Snape discover that Moody is actually the Death Eater Barty Crouch Jr, who has been constantly drinking Polyjuice Potion. When they administer him a truth potion, he reveals that he placed Harry's name in the Goblet, supported him through the Tasks so that he would reach the Triwizard Cup first, and ensured he was transported to the graveyard for the rite by turning the cup into a Portkey. Crouch Jr. is handed over to the Dementors, who render him soulless with the Dementor's Kiss. Recovering in the hospital wing, Harry narrates the events to Cedric's parents and offers them his tournament winnings; they will not accept the gold, so he gives it to Fred and George Weasley so they can open their joke shop. During a memorial service for Cedric, Dumbledore tells the students of Hogwarts that Voldemort has returned. Cornelius Fudge, the Minister of Magic, is sceptical of Harry's story.

== Development ==
Harry Potter and the Goblet of Fire is the fourth book in the Harry Potter series. The first, Harry Potter and the Philosopher's Stone, was published by Bloomsbury on 26 June 1997. The second, Harry Potter and the Chamber of Secrets, was published on 2 July 1998. The third, Harry Potter and the Prisoner of Azkaban, followed on 8 July 1999. Goblet of Fire is almost twice the size of the first three books (the paperback edition was 636 pages). J. K. Rowling stated that she "knew from the beginning it would be the biggest of the first four." She said there needed to be a "proper run-up" for the conclusion and rushing the "complex plot" could confuse readers. She also stated that "everything is on a bigger scale," which was symbolic, as Harry Potter's horizons widened both literally and metaphorically as he grew up. She also wanted to explore more of the magical world.

Until the official title's announcement on 27 June 2000, the book was called by its working title, "Harry Potter IV". Previously, in April, the publisher had listed it as Harry Potter and the Doomspell Tournament. However, J. K. Rowling expressed her indecision about the title in an Entertainment Weekly interview. "I changed my mind twice on what [the title] was. The working title had got out — Harry Potter and the Doomspell Tournament. Then I changed Doomspell to Triwizard Tournament. Then I was teetering between Goblet of Fire and Triwizard Tournament. In the end, I preferred Goblet of Fire because it's got that kind of cup of destiny feel about it, which is the theme of the book."

Rowling mentioned that she originally wrote a Weasley relative named Mafalda, who, according to Rowling, "was the daughter of the 'second cousin who's a stockbroker' mentioned in Philosopher's Stone. This stockbroker had been very rude to Mr. and Mrs. Weasley in the past, but now he and his (Muggle) wife had inconveniently produced a witch, they came back to the Weasleys asking for their help in introducing her to wizarding society before she starts at Hogwarts". Mafalda was supposed to be a talented nosy Slytherin match for Hermione Granger and was to fill in the Rita Skeeter subplot, but she was eventually removed because "there were obvious limitations to what an eleven-year-old closeted at school could discover." Rowling considered Rita Skeeter to be "much more flexible". Rowling also admitted that the fourth book was the most difficult to write at the time because the Mafalda character also served as a giant plot hole, which she discovered halfway through writing.

== Themes ==
Jeff Jensen, who interviewed Rowling for Entertainment Weekly in 2000, pointed out that bigotry is a big theme in the Harry Potter novels and Goblet of Fire in particular. He mentioned how Voldemort and his followers are prejudiced against Muggles and how, in Goblet of Fire, Hermione forms a group to liberate Hogwarts' house-elves who have "been indentured servants so long they lack desire for anything else". When asked why she explored this theme, Rowling replied,

Because bigotry is probably the thing I detest most. All forms of intolerance, the whole idea of that which is different from me is necessarily evil. I really like to explore the idea that difference is equal and good. But there's another idea that I like to explore, too. Oppressed groups are not, generally speaking, people who stand firmly together – no, sadly, they kind of subdivide among themselves and fight like hell. That's human nature, so that's what you see here. This world of wizards and witches, they're already ostracized, and then within themselves, they've formed a loathsome pecking order.

She also commented that she did not feel this was too "heavy" for children, as it was one of those things that a "huge number of children at that age start to think about".

== Publication and reception ==
=== UK/US release ===
Goblet of Fire was the first book in the Harry Potter series to be released in the United States on the same date as the United Kingdom, on 8 July 2000, strategically on a Saturday so children did not have to worry about school conflicting with buying the book. It had a combined first-printing of over five million copies. It was given a record-breaking print run of 3.9 million. Three million copies of the book were sold over the first weekend in the US alone. FedEx dispatched more than 9,000 trucks and 100 planes to fulfil book deliveries. The pressure in editing caused a mistake which shows Harry's father emerging first from Voldemort's wand; however, as confirmed in Prisoner of Azkaban, James died first, so then Harry's mother ought to have come out first. This was corrected in later editions.

==== Launch publicity ====
To publicise the book, a special train named Hogwarts Express was organised by Bloomsbury, and run from King's Cross to Perth, carrying J.K. Rowling, a consignment of books for her to sign and sell, also representatives of Bloomsbury and the press. The book was launched on 8 July 2000, on platform 1 at King's Cross – which had been given "Platform 9 3/4" signs for the occasion – following which the train departed. En route it called at Didcot Railway Centre, Kidderminster, the Severn Valley Railway, Crewe (overnight stop), Manchester, Bradford, York, the National Railway Museum (overnight stop), Newcastle, Edinburgh, arriving at Perth on 11 July.

The locomotive was West Country class steam locomotive no. 34027 Taw Valley, which was specially repainted red for the tour; it later returned to its normal green livery (the repaints were requested and paid for by Bloomsbury). The coaches of the train included a sleeping car. A Diesel locomotive was coupled at the other end, for use when reversals were necessary, such as the first stage of the journey as far as Ferme Park, just south of Hornsey. The tour generated considerably more press interest than the launch of the film Thomas and the Magic Railroad, which premiered in London the same weekend.

=== Critical reception ===
In The New York Times Book Review, author Stephen King stated the Goblet of Fire was "every bit as good as Potters 1 through 3" and praised the humour and subplots, although he commented that "there's also a moderately tiresome amount of adolescent squabbling...it's a teenage thing". Kirkus Reviews called it "another grand tale of magic and mystery...and clicking along so smoothly that it seems shorter than it is". However, they commented that it did tend to lag, especially at the end where two "bad guys" stopped the action to give extended explanations, and that the issues to be resolved in sequels would leave "many readers, particularly American ones, uncomfortable". For The Horn Book Magazine, Martha V. Parravano gave a mixed review, saying "some will find [it] wide-ranging, compellingly written, and absorbing; others, long, rambling, and tortuously fraught with adverbs". A Publishers Weekly review praised the book's "red herrings, the artful clues and tricky surprises that disarm the most attentive audience" and saying it "might be her most thrilling yet". Writing for The New Yorker, Joan Acocella noted that "where the prior volumes moved like lightning, here the pace is slower, the energy more dispersed. At the same time, the tone becomes more grim".

Kristin Lemmerman of CNN said that it is not great literature: 'Her prose has more in common with your typical beach-blanket fare and the beginning contained too much recap to introduce characters to new readers, although Rowling quickly gets back on track, introducing readers to a host of well-drawn new characters.' Writing for Salon.com, Charles Taylor was generally positive about the change of mood and development of characters. Entertainment Weekly's reviewer Kristen Baldwin gave Goblet of Fire the grade of A−, praising the development of the characters as well as the many themes presented. However, she did worry that a shocking climax may be a "nightmare factory" for young readers.

In 2012 it was ranked number 98 on a list of the top 100 children's novels published by School Library Journal.

=== Awards and honours ===
Harry Potter and the Goblet of Fire won several awards, including the 2001 Hugo Award for Best Novel. It won the 2002 Indian Paintbrush Book Award, the third after Philosopher's Stone and Prisoner of Azkaban. The novel also won an Oppenheim Toy Portfolio Platinum Award for one of the best books, who claimed it was "more intense than the first three books". In addition, Entertainment Weekly listed Goblet of Fire in second place on their list of The New Classics: Books – The 100 best reads from 1983 to 2008. The Guardian ranked Harry Potter and the Goblet of Fire #97 in its list of 100 Best Books of the 21st Century.

== Adaptations ==
=== Film ===
Harry Potter and the Goblet of Fire was adapted into a film, released worldwide on 18 November 2005, which was directed by Mike Newell and written by Steve Kloves. The film grossed $102.7 million for the opening weekend and eventually grossed $896 million worldwide. The film was also nominated for Best Art Direction at the 78th Academy Awards.

=== Video game ===
It was also made into a video game for Windows, PlayStation 2, Nintendo DS, GameCube, Xbox, Game Boy Advance, and PlayStation Portable by Electronic Arts. It was released just before the film.
