= Ron Weasley =

Fictional character of Harry Potter series

- Harry Potter character
- Rupert Grint as Ron Weasley (Note: Promotional image for Harry Potter and the Order of the Phoenix (2007))
- First appearance: Harry Potter and the Philosopher's Stone (1997)
- Created by: J. K. Rowling
- Portrayed by: Rupert Grint (films); Alastair Stout (television series)
- Voiced by: Gregg Chillin (Note: Philosopher's Stone–Goblet of Fire video games, Harry Potter for Kinect); Rupert Grint (Note: Order of the Phoenix–Deathly Hallows – Part 2 video games); Jason Anthony (Note: Wizards Unite); Robbie Kay (Note: Quidditch Champions)

In-universe information
- Full name: Ronald Bilius Weasley
- Family: Arthur Weasley (father); Molly Weasley (mother); Bill Weasley (brother); Charlie Weasley (brother); Percy Weasley (brother); Fred Weasley (brother); George Weasley (brother); Ginny Weasley (sister)
- Spouse: Hermione Granger
- Children: Rose Granger-Weasley; Hugo Granger-Weasley
- Nationality: British
- House: Gryffindor
- Born: 1 March 1980

Ronald "Ron" Weasley is a fictional character in the Harry Potter series of novels by J. K. Rowling. He is introduced in Harry Potter and the Philosopher's Stone as a first-year student on his way to Hogwarts, a school of magic. During the school year, Ron befriends Harry Potter and Hermione Granger. Being the only member of the trio who was raised in wizarding society, he provides insight into wizarding customs and traditions. Along with Harry and Hermione, he is a member of Gryffindor House at Hogwarts and is present for most of the action throughout the series. Ron is portrayed by Rupert Grint in all eight Harry Potter films, and will be played by Alastair Stout in the upcoming television series.

== Creation and development ==
Ron was one of the first Harry Potter characters that Rowling created. Although Ron and Hermione form a romantic bond in the series and eventually have children, Rowling confessed in a 2014 interview that she wrote the relationship as "a form of wish fulfilment". She said the characters are fundamentally incompatible in some ways, but that their relationship might function with "a bit of counselling".

== Appearances ==
=== Novels ===
==== Harry Potter and the Philosopher's Stone ====
Ron is introduced in the first novel in the series, Harry Potter and the Philosopher's Stone (1997). He and his family encounter Harry Potter at King's Cross station and help him find the Hogwarts Express. Once aboard the train, Ron and Harry meet Hermione Granger, whom they initially dislike. At Hogwarts, all three students are assigned to Gryffindor House. After Ron and Harry save Hermione from a troll, they develop a friendship with her. When the trio seeks the Philosopher's Stone, Ron uses his skill at Wizard's Chess to allow Harry and Hermione to proceed safely through a dangerous, life-sized chess game. At the last dinner of the school year, the Hogwarts headmaster Albus Dumbledore rewards Ron's chess skill by giving him fifty House points, which helps Gryffindor win the House Cup.

==== Harry Potter and the Chamber of Secrets ====
Ron returns in Harry Potter and the Chamber of Secrets (1998). During the summer after his first year at Hogwarts, Ron writes to Harry several times. He receives no answer because his letters are intercepted by Dobby the house-elf. Ron becomes so concerned that he and his brothers Fred and George fly to Harry's house in their father's enchanted car. Harry spends the next month at the Weasleys' home. When Harry and Ron are unable to board the train to Hogwarts, they take the flying car instead. Ron receives a Howler from his mother, who berates him for taking the car.

Later in the novel, Ron and Harry use Polyjuice Potion to disguise themselves as they infiltrate the Slytherin dormitory and attempt to gather information about the Chamber of Secrets. During a journey into the Forbidden Forest, Ron is forced to encounter his worst nightmare: spiders. The giant arachnids nearly devour Ron and Harry, but the enchanted car rescues them. Ron and Harry then enter the Chamber to save Ron's sister Ginny, who was kidnapped. After Harry rescues her, both boys are given awards for their service to Hogwarts.

==== Harry Potter and the Prisoner of Azkaban ====
In Harry Potter and the Prisoner of Azkaban (1999), Ron's pet rat Scabbers goes missing. Ron, Harry and Hermione eventually discover him hiding in Hagrid's hut. When Scabbers runs off again, Ron chases him to the Whomping Willow, where he is snatched by a large black dog and dragged into a tunnel. Ron and his friends follow the tunnel to the Shrieking Shack. The dog turns out to be Sirius Black, who explains that Scabbers is actually the Death Eater Peter Pettigrew. As Ron returns to Hogwarts with Harry, Hermione, Sirius and Remus Lupin, Pettigrew knocks Ron unconscious and escapes. (Note: Attributed to multiple references:) Ron is forced to remain in the hospital wing of Hogwarts while Harry and Hermione travel back in time to rescue Sirius and the hippogriff Buckbeak.

==== Harry Potter and the Goblet of Fire ====
The Weasleys invite Harry and Hermione to the Quidditch World Cup in Harry Potter and the Goblet of Fire (2000). Ron is in awe when he sees his favourite Quidditch player, Viktor Krum. He is even more excited when Krum comes to Hogwarts to participate in the Triwizard Tournament. At Christmas time, Ron attends the Yule Ball with Padma Patil. He becomes very upset when he sees that Hermione's date to the Ball is Krum, and the two have a heated argument. In the second task of the Tournament, Harry must rescue Ron from the depths of the Hogwarts lake.

==== Harry Potter and the Order of the Phoenix ====
In Harry Potter and the Order of the Phoenix (2003), Ron is made a Gryffindor prefect. His brother Percy congratulates him and advises him to become an ally of Dolores Umbridge, the new Defence Against the Dark Arts professor appointed by the Ministry of Magic. Ron, however, does not support Umbridge's policy of refusing to teach students practical defensive magic. He, Harry and Hermione form the group Dumebledore's Army, which provides a venue for students to practise defensive spellcasting. Ron also joins the Gryffindor Quidditch team as Keeper and helps Gryffindor win the Quidditch Cup. Near the end of the novel, Ron battles Death Eaters at the Department of Mysteries alongside Harry, Hermione, Ginny, Neville Longbottom and Luna Lovegood. He is injured during the fight, but makes a full recovery.

==== Harry Potter and the Half-Blood Prince ====
Ron returns as Quidditch Keeper in Harry Potter and the Half-Blood Prince (2005). However, he performs poorly at Quidditch after learning that Hermione may have kissed Krum. He becomes upset when he observes his younger sister Ginny kissing a boy, and Ginny reacts by pointing out that Ron has never been kissed. To bolster Ron's confidence for an upcoming Quidditch match, Harry pretends to give him a luck potion. Believing he has actually taken the potion, Ron performs well and Gryffindor wins the match. During the ensuing celebration, Ron kisses Lavender Brown. Hermione becomes jealous and begins to ignore Ron, who gradually becomes dissatisfied with his relationship with Lavender.

In March, Ron eats chocolates containing a love potion. Horace Slughorn administers an antidote, then kindly offers Ron some mead. Unbeknownst to Slughorn, the mead is poisoned; Harry saves Ron's life by forcing a bezoar down his throat. Ron is taken to the hospital wing, where he is visited by a panic-stricken Hermione. After recovering, Ron reconciles with Hermione and breaks up with Lavender. Later in the novel, Death Eaters enter Hogwarts. Ron, Hermione, Ginny and other students and staff fight them. Snape kills Dumbledore during the battle, after which Ron and Hermione vow to help Harry find and destroy Voldemort's Horcruxes. Rowling said that before this novel, Ron is relatively immature, but the events of Half-Blood Prince help him "grow up emotionally" and become a worthy partner for Hermione.

==== Harry Potter and the Deathly Hallows ====
In Harry Potter and the Deathly Hallows (2007), Ron and his friends use Polyjuice Potion to impersonate employees of the Ministry of Magic. They then infiltrate the Ministry and retrieve a Horcrux in the possession of Dolores Umbridge. Fearing the locket containing the Horcrux might be lost or stolen, Harry requests that someone wear it at all times. Wearing the locket has a profound effect on Ron, who lashes out at Harry and Hermione and abandons them. Ron immediately regrets his decision to leave, but is captured by Snatchers and cannot return. Eventually he reunites with his companions with the help of the Deluminator he inherited from Dumbledore. He finds Harry attempting to recover the Sword of Gryffindor from an icy pool and rescues him from drowning. Harry forgives Ron for leaving and insists that he use the sword to destroy the locket.

The trio are captured by Snatchers but are rescued by the house-elf Dobby, who dies during the escape. Eventually, the trio returns to Hogwarts, hoping to find the last unknown Horcrux shown in Harry's vision. Having lost the Sword of Gryffindor to Griphook the goblin, Ron gets an idea to procure more Basilisk fangs and manages to speak enough Parseltongue to open the Chamber of Secrets, where Hermione destroys the Horcrux in Helga Hufflepuff's cup. He begins to worry about the fate of Hogwarts' elves. Upon hearing this, Hermione drops the basilisk fangs she was carrying and kisses him for the first time. He also takes part in the Battle of Hogwarts, witnessing the death of his brother Fred, and teams up with Neville to defeat Fenrir Greyback.

In the epilogue of Deathly Hallows, which is set nineteen years after Voldemort's death, Ron and Hermione are sending their daughter Rose Granger-Weasley off to her first year at Hogwarts. They also have a younger son named Hugo. In interviews following the release of the novel, Rowling gave differing accounts of Ron's life after the events of the series. On one occasion she said Ron and Harry work for the Ministry of Magic as Aurors. In a later interview, she said that Ron works at the joke shop Weasleys' Wizard Wheezes with his brother George.

== Portrayal ==
=== Film adaptations ===
Rupert Grint portrays Ron Weasley in all eight Harry Potter films. He auditioned after seeing a segment on the children's news programme, Newsround, inviting children to apply for the role. Grint sent in a photo, a self-written script and a rap explaining his suitability for the part. Rowling was supportive of the casting, calling Grint perfect for the role. As part of the preparation for the film Prisoner of Azkaban, the actors playing Ron, Harry and Hermione were each asked to write an autobiographical essay about their character. The director, Alfonso Cuarón, recalled that Rupert Grint failed to deliver his essay. When Caurón asked him why he did not write it, Grint replied, "I'm Ron; Ron wouldn't do it", to which Caurón replied, "Okay, you do understand your character."

Grint's performance in Harry Potter and the Philosopher's Stone earned him the Satellite Award for Outstanding New Talent and the Young Artist Award for Most Promising Young Newcomer. In a 2020 article, Nathan Sharp of Screen Rant described him as the most natural child actor in the early films, and "excellent from minute one". Grint commented on playing Ron in the series: "The line between Ron Weasley and me got thinner with each film".

=== Television series adaptation ===
Alastair Stout is set to portray Ron Weasley in the television series version of Harry Potter, as announced on 27 May 2025.

=== Harry Potter and the Cursed Child ===
Harry Potter and the Cursed Child is a play written by Jack Thorne from an original story by Thorne, J.K. Rowling and John Tiffany. The plot occurs nineteen years after the events of Harry Potter and the Deathly Hallows. In the play, Ron and Hermione send their daughter Rose on the train to Hogwarts. Hermione is now the Minister for Magic, while Ron manages Weasley's Wizard Wheezes with his brother George. In the second act, Harry's son Albus Severus and Draco Malfoy's son Scorpius travel through time, and their actions change Ron and Hermione's relationship during their time at Hogwarts. Ron falls in love with Padma Patil at the Yule Ball, with the result that Ron and Hermione never marry. However, this alternate timeline is eventually erased, and the original timeline is restored.

In 2016, Paul Thornley portrayed Ron Weasley in the stage debut of the play at the Palace Theatre in London. For his performance, Thornley was nominated for Best Supporting Actor in a Play at the 2017 WhatsOnStage Awards. Thornley reprised the role on Broadway at the Lyric Theater in 2018, and again in 2020.

== Characterisation ==
=== Appearance and personality ===
In the first novel, Ron is described as tall, thin and gangling, with freckles, a long nose, and large hands and feet. He has the trademark red hair of the Weasleys, and according to Rowling he has blue eyes. Ron is known for his humour, loyalty, readiness to defend his friends, and his love of food. Rowling has described him as funny but insensitive. She said that although he is the most immature of the three main characters, he matures in the final novel and acknowledges his weaknesses, which turns him into a man.

== Reception ==
The entertainment website IGN selected Ron as the third best Harry Potter character, writing that his status as comic relief makes him instantly endearing. The IGN writers claimed that unlike most sidekicks, Ron is not a coward or a simpleton, and is not content to "live in Harry's shadow". They said that he overcomes his shortcomings with "faithfulness and perseverance". Empire magazine included Ron's friendship with Harry as one of the 33 best friendships in film.

== In popular culture ==
In 2003, the British charity organisation Comic Relief performed a spoof story called Harry Potter and the Secret Chamberpot of Azerbaijan, in which Jennifer Saunders appeared as both Ron and J. K. Rowling.
