= Resurrection stone =

A resurrection stone is a stone of immense weight which was hired out to prevent newly buried corpses from being stolen.

== List of resurrection stones in the United Kingdom ==
- St Laurence Church, Lurgashall
- Llantrisant
- Dean Row Chapel, Wilmslow
