= Death Eater =

Fictional villainous characters in Harry Potter

- Harry Potter organization
- Lord Voldemort (centre) with Bellatrix Lestrange (left), Lucius Malfoy (right) and several masked Death Eaters (back)
- Founded: Lord Voldemort
- Location: United Kingdom
- Leader: Lord Voldemort
- Key people: Bellatrix Lestrange; Severus Snape; Lucius Malfoy; Peter Pettigrew; Barty Crouch Jr; Draco Malfoy
- Purpose: Preservation of blood purity; Find Lord Voldemort; Control of wizarding world; Retrieve the Elder Wand; Get Draco to kill Dumbledore; Dominance over Muggles
- Powers: Dark magic
- Enemies: Harry Potter; Order of the Phoenix/Marauders; Albus Dumbledore; Igor Karkaroff; Dumbledore's Army; Ministry of Magic; Cedric Diggory

The Death Eaters are a fictional extremist organisation from the Harry Potter series, led by the dark wizard Lord Voldemort. They follow a strict belief in pure-blood supremacy, in that pure-blood wizards should have power over the Wizarding world. Because of this, they feel it is their duty to eliminate wizards born to non-magical families to keep their bloodlines pure.

In the timeline of the Harry Potter series, the Death Eaters were formed as Voldemort's army during the First Wizarding War. During this time, their activities focused on fighting against the Ministry of Magic and the Order of the Phoenix, the two main opposing groups. They used attacks and threats against their enemies and their families to create fear and weaken their resistance.

The Death Eaters were first introduced as a group in the novel Harry Potter and the Goblet of Fire (2000). However, individual members such as Severus Snape, Lucius Malfoy, and Peter Pettigrew appeared in earlier books. The name of the group is only mentioned from the fourth book onward, but Voldemort’s followers are talked about in Harry Potter and the Philosopher's Stone and in Harry Potter and the Chamber of Secrets.

== Concept ==
According to J.K. Rowling's speech at the 2007 Carnegie Hall event, the Death Eaters' beliefs are similar to the extremist ideas of the Nazi party.

== Synopsis ==
An artist's rendering of the Dark Mark, Lord Voldemort's symbol

=== Pre-Harry Potter ===
The Death Eaters first existed over 11 years before the events of the Harry Potter novels, torturing and murdering Muggles (non-magical people), as well as anyone who opposed them. When a deadly curse from Voldemort rebounded off Harry Potter and disembodied Voldemort, the Death Eaters largely disbanded and vanished.

=== Re-emergence ===
Early in Harry Potter and the Goblet of Fire, a group of Death Eaters gathers at the Quidditch World Cup and spread chaos and fear amongst the wizarding community. Voldemort regains his full strength at the end of Goblet of Fire, and summons his followers to him.

The Minister for Magic, Cornelius Fudge, deludes himself into believing that Voldemort could not have come back and that it was all a lie cooked up by Dumbledore, who Fudge believes had designs on his political office. The Death Eaters use this tactical advantage throughout Harry Potter and the Order of the Phoenix to maintain their secrecy. Because of the Ministry's refusal to remove the Dementors from Azkaban (as Dumbledore advises immediately following Voldemort's return), the Death Eaters recruit the Dementors to their cause and make similar progress with the giants; the Dementors' revolt against the Ministry of Magic also allows the Death Eaters to bolster their ranks with the mass break-out of several imprisoned Death Eaters, including Bellatrix Lestrange.

Towards the end of Harry Potter and the Half-Blood Prince, the Death Eaters attack Hogwarts for the first time, leading to the death of Albus Dumbledore and injuries to several of the school's defenders. A second, more deadly attack near the conclusion of Harry Potter and the Deathly Hallows results in over 50 deaths, including that of Voldemort, who dies when the Killing Curse he casts at Harry rebounds on him. All the Dark Marks on the remaining Death Eaters fade to scars.

=== Ideology ===
Voldemort's Death Eaters practise illegal and dangerous spells known as dark magic. They follow a racist ideology that places pure-blooded wizards at the top of a racial hierarchy, above all other magical or non-magical people and entities. They believe wizards are, as a genealogy book within the story phrases it, "Nature's Nobility"; other magical creatures and the non-magical are inferior and should be subjugated. Within the wizarding community, only those who are born to wizard parents are worthy of magical power, despite the fact that parentage does not in fact determine who possesses such powers. They categorise wizards according to blood purity; "pure-bloods" (those with only wizards as parents) out-rank "half-bloods" (mixed parentage) and "mudbloods", a derogatory name for those born to non-magical parents (Muggles). Death Eaters have also attacked pure-bloods who oppose them. Examples of this are pure-blooded members of the Order of the Phoenix such as Sirius Black, the Prewett brothers, who were murdered because of their loyalties, and the entire Weasley family. Such people are often called "blood traitors" by those who subscribe to Death Eater ideologies.

In reality, the idea of blood purity is a misnomer – Voldemort himself is a half-blood – and it is unlikely that all of them could be pure-bloods, as very few, if any, such people could exist given the small gene pool. In Half-Blood Prince, Rowling depicts the Gaunts as a family who are obsessed with their ancestry and driven to inbreeding to preserve its integrity. Rowling has stated on her website that there are no true pure-blood families left but that those who call themselves such simply strike Muggles, Squibs, and half-bloods from their family records. On the other hand, "in rare circumstances" a Muggle-born wizard can become a Death Eater. They are also not above recruiting creatures they deem inferior, as proven by werewolf Fenrir Greyback and the giant clan from continental Europe, as long as they help further the larger Death Eater agenda.

The Death Eaters seek complete power and control over the entire Wizarding world, wishing to restrict leadership to a small band of pure-bloods. The Death Eaters not only seek the restoration of pure-blood rule over the Wizarding community, but also the eventual subjugation of the Muggle community under Wizarding rule. During their control over the Ministry of Magic, they severely persecuted Muggle-born wizards, sending them to Azkaban for life or feeding them to Dementors.

== Notable Death Eater characters ==
=== Alecto and Amycus Carrow ===
Alecto and Amycus Carrow are siblings who participate in the assault on Hogwarts at the end of Harry Potter and the Half-Blood Prince. Amycus is described as being squat and lumpy, with a lopsided leer and a wheezy giggle; Alecto is described as a "stocky little woman" and shares her brother's squatness and laugh.

In Harry Potter and the Deathly Hallows, Alecto and Amycus become "teachers" at Hogwarts, severely disciplining students who oppose Voldemort. Amycus teaches Defence Against the Dark Arts, but as Neville Longbottom puts it, it becomes just "The Dark Arts" in which students are forced to perform the Cruciatus Curse against students who have been assigned to detention. Alecto teaches Muggle Studies, which becomes a compulsory subject, and teaches students that Muggles are like animals.

Ralph Ineson plays Amycus, and Suzie Toase appears as Alecto in the films.

=== Barty Crouch Jr ===
Bartemius "Barty" Crouch, Junior was captured by the Ministry of Magic along with Bellatrix, Rodolphus, and Rabastan Lestrange soon after the initial fall of Voldemort and torturing Neville's parents with the Cruciatus Curse. His father, Bartemius Crouch, who headed the Department of Magical Law Enforcement at the time, sentenced him to life imprisonment in Azkaban after being exposed by Igor Karkaroff. However, Barty Crouch Jr. eventually escaped the prison with the help of his father, who placed him under house arrest via the Imperius Curse.

Barty Crouch Jr attended the 1994 Quidditch World Cup under an Invisibility Cloak. During the attack on the tournament by other Death Eaters, he overcame the influence of his father's Imperius Curse, stole Harry Potter's wand, and cast the Dark Mark in the sky. He was not discovered, but was taken back home by his father and placed under the Imperius Curse again. Soon thereafter, he was freed from his house arrest by Lord Voldemort, who placed Crouch Sr under the Imperius Curse instead.

Crouch Jr later subdued and imprisoned Alastor "Mad-Eye" Moody, a famous Auror, and used Polyjuice Potion to assume Moody's appearance and infiltrate Hogwarts as the new Defence Against the Dark Arts teacher, thus demonstrating the unforgivable curses.

The revived Triwizard Tournament is held at Hogwarts, and Voldemort tasks Crouch Jr with ensuring Harry's victory. To do this, he puts Harry's name in the Goblet of Fire, bewitches Viktor Krum with the Imperius Curse to attack Cedric Diggory in the maze, and stuns Fleur Delacour. When Harry and Cedric simultaneously touch the Triwizard Cup, which is a Portkey, it transports them to the graveyard in Little Hangleton, home of the Riddle family. There, after killing Cedric, Death Eater Peter Pettigrew uses Harry's blood in a ritual that returns Voldemort to a physical body and summon Lucius and the Death Eaters. Voldemort attempts to kill Harry, but with the help of the ghost-echoes of Voldemort's previous victims, Harry escapes via the Portkey with Cedric's body.

When Harry reappears at Hogwarts, the still-disguised Crouch Jr hopes to succeed where his master failed and kill Harry; however, Dumbledore, Snape, and McGonagall foil his plot. Under the effects of Veritaserum, he recounts his plan to them. Although he is closely guarded so he can later repeat his testimony, a Dementor acting as bodyguard to Minister for Magic Cornelius Fudge attacks Crouch and sucks out his soul before anyone can stop it. Crouch lives from then on in a vegetative state, bereft of his memories or sense of self.

He is played by David Tennant in the film adaptation of Harry Potter and the Goblet of Fire.

=== Antonin Dolohov ===
Antonin Dolohov has a long, pale, and twisted face. He is confirmed in Half-Blood Prince to be one of Voldemort's first Death Eaters. Dolohov is one of the five Death Eaters who murder Gideon and Fabian Prewett (Molly Weasley's brothers). Dolohov is imprisoned in Azkaban but escapes during the mass break-out of 1996.

He participates in the battle of the Department of Mysteries, where he injures Hermione, but is imprisoned again and returns to Azkaban. He escapes once more some time before the events of Deathly Hallows. Dolohov later participates in the Battle of Hogwarts, killing Remus Lupin. Professor Flitwick finally defeats him. He is portrayed by Arben Bajraktaraj in the film adaptations of Order of the Phoenix and Deathly Hallows – Part 1.

=== Igor Karkaroff ===
Igor Karkaroff (Cyrillic: Игор Каркаров) is the Headmaster at Durmstrang Institute, one of the three schools (together with Hogwarts and Beauxbatons Academy) that enter the Triwizard Tournament. As Headmaster, Karkaroff is also one of the judges. He is described as a neat, fussy-looking man with an oily voice and manner who sports a small grey goatee. While unctuously pleasant most of the time, he is capable of violent rage. He is also described as "a man with yellowish teeth whose smile does not reach his cold stare". Before, he was a Death Eater and a prisoner from Azkaban. There he was interrogated by Barty Crouch Sr and gives false names, including Snape. Karkaroff then exposes Barty Crouch Jr for using the Cruciatus Curse on Neville's parents. He was likely sent back to Azkaban or released for giving away a Death Eater's name. Karkaroff is angered and threatens to withdraw from the tournament when Harry is selected as a fourth champion and second representative for Hogwarts. Although he is talked down and agrees to stay, he nevertheless shows evident favouritism towards the Durmstrang champion, Bulgarian Quidditch player Viktor Krum.

Sirius Black later identifies Karkaroff as a former Death Eater.

In the sixth novel, Harry Potter and the Half-Blood Prince, Remus Lupin states that Karkaroff was found dead in a shack with the Dark Mark hovering over it, an indication that he was killed by other Death Eaters.

Predrag Bjelac appeared as Karkaroff in the film adaptation of Goblet of Fire.

=== Bellatrix Lestrange ===
Bellatrix Lestrange is the aunt of Draco Malfoy and Nymphadora Tonks. She is introduced in Harry Potter and the Order of the Phoenix. She is the most faithful member of Voldemort's inner circle. She is described as being highly attractive yet emaciated due to her time in Azkaban, for which she was sentenced for the torture and permanent incapacitation of Neville Longbottom's parents. She escaped Azkaban and reunites with Voldemort. With Lucius, she kills Sirius Black with the Killing Curse. Then she forces Draco to kill Dumbledore. She then meets with Harry, Hermione and Ron after the Death Eaters captured them. After they escaped, Dobby is seen stabbed by Bellatrix's dagger for betraying Lucius. Bellatrix is later slaughtered by Molly Weasley after attempting to kill Ginny Weasley. Bellatrix is portrayed as paranoid, insane, sadistic, and fanatically devoted to Voldemort, seeing service to him as the noblest duty for any true wizard or witch.

=== Draco Malfoy ===
Draco Malfoy is the pure-blooded son of Lucius and Narcissa Malfoy. He was a notorious bully to Harry Potter and his friends throughout the series. Draco becomes a Death Eater in his sixth year at Hogwarts and is assigned to kill Dumbledore. However, he fails and Dumbledore is ultimately killed by Snape. Draco, like his family, is part of Slytherin house. Draco repaired a vanishing cabinet to let the Death Eaters in from the inside. In the Cursed Child, Malfoy was married to Astoria Greengrass, and has a child named Scorpius, one of the two main protagonists in the eighth Harry Potter book, and best friends with Albus Severus Potter.

He is portrayed by Tom Felton in all of the films and by Tom Stephens in the Cursed Child.

=== Lucius Malfoy ===
Lucius Malfoy is the head of a wealthy pure-blood wizarding family. He lives with his wife Narcissa Malfoy and their son Draco at Malfoy Manor in Wiltshire. Lucius was a school governor of Hogwarts before being sacked, and has very close connections at the Ministry of Magic. He was educated at Hogwarts, where he was a prefect in Slytherin House.

He first appears near the beginning of Harry Potter and the Chamber of Secrets, when he plants Tom Riddle's diary in Ginny Weasley's cauldron while she is shopping for school supplies, which is part of a plot to open the Chamber of Secrets and cause harm to Muggle-born students.

Lucius knows the diary is cleverly enchanted, but is not aware that it is a horcrux containing a part of Voldemort's soul. He is careless with it and punished by Voldemort himself. Lucius intends to use the opening of the Chamber of Secrets by Ginny to discredit her father, Arthur Weasley, and Dumbledore. Lucius' plans are ultimately thwarted with the help of the Malfoys' house-elf Dobby, and Harry, but not before the Chamber is opened and Lucius uses the ensuing terror to influence the school's Board of Governors to discredit and dismiss Dumbledore as Headmaster.

After the basilisk in the Chamber of Secrets is killed, Dumbledore is reinstated as Headmaster. Lucius, whose part in the scheme to remove Dumbledore is exposed, is ultimately stripped of his title as a Hogwarts school governor. Harry gives Voldemort's diary to Malfoy wrapped in a sock and Lucius denies ownership, but throws the sock away, which Dobby catches. A gift of clothing ending a house-elf’s servitude, Dobby proclaims himself free which angers Lucius. He attempts to attack Harry with a curse, but Dobby repels him and Lucius threatens Harry about the latter's parents.

In Harry Potter and the Goblet of Fire, Lucius and Draco spectate the Quidditch World Cup, whilst confronting Harry, Hermione, the Weasleys and Cedric Diggory. When Voldemort rises again with Cedric Diggory's death and summons his Death Eaters, Malfoy rejoins him and asserts that he had done everything he could to help his master, who however remains unimpressed. He watches Voldemort's duel with Harry but soon Harry escapes with Cedric's body away from Voldemort. Harry reports Malfoy's declarations to Minister Fudge, who refuses to believe him.

During the climax of Harry Potter and the Order of the Phoenix, Malfoy is the leader of the Death Eaters who are sent to retrieve the prophecy from Harry in the Hall of Prophecy. Lucius tries several ways to get the prophecy from Harry without breaking it, but the boy and his friends manage to escape from the Hall. Malfoy finally meets him in the Death Chamber, where Harry is about to give it to Malfoy when the Order of the Phoenix breaks into the Ministry and begins to duel with the Death Eaters. Lucius and another Death Eater duels Sirius Black and Harry and Lucius is knocked away by Sirius before Bellatrix casts the Killing Curse on Sirius. Dumbledore himself arrives at the end of the battle and Malfoy is captured and sent to Azkaban.

By the final book, Voldemort has given Malfoy his freedom, but he has lost Voldemort's favour. Voldemort treats him with great contempt by hijacking his house for headquarters, and is forcing his son to do dark deeds against his nature. Voldemort borrows Lucius's wand, which is accidentally destroyed by Harry Potter. Later in the book, Lucius, along with his wife and sister-in-law, accidentally allow Harry and his friends to escape from Malfoy Manor. Voldemort punishes them severely, eventually putting them under house arrest.

Despite his long-standing position as a Death Eater and Voldemort's advocate of pure-blood supremacy, Lucius decides his love for his family is more important than his involvement in the war. During the Battle of Hogwarts, he pleads with Voldemort to let him onto the battlefield so he can find his son. He is reunited with the rest of his family at the end of the book. Because Narcissa aided Harry in the Forbidden Forest, the Malfoys all manage to avoid being sent to Azkaban after Voldemort's death.

In the film series, Lucius is portrayed by Jason Isaacs as an adult. Scenes with Tony Coburn as a teenage Lucius were recorded for Harry Potter and the Half-Blood Prince, but were cut from the final movie. According to Isaacs, Lucius's desire to be in a position of supremacy and a "fear of the future he doesn't belong in" drive his actions; Isaacs described Lucius as "a repulsive creature [...] a racist [...] a eugenicist [...] a bully [...] a terrible father". When it came to Malfoy's fate, Isaacs surmised in an interview with Syfy Wire that he believes Lucius would not feel like a member of wizarding society again after Voldemort's fall, as society would shun him. Isaacs also states that Lucius would become a shell of his former self, lose the respect of his wife and son, protect himself with his money, and drink himself into an early grave.

=== Peter Pettigrew ===
Peter Pettigrew (aka Wormtail) was a close friend of Sirius Black, James Potter, and Remus Lupin. With Sirius and James' help, he became an Animagus who could transform into a rat. After leaving Hogwarts, Pettigrew joined forces with Voldemort, and became his spy in the Order of the Phoenix. When the Potters knew that their son, Harry, was Voldemort's target, Sirius suggested to them to use Pettigrew as Secret-Keeper because he did not believe Voldemort would ever suspect Pettigrew. Pettigrew betrayed the secret to Voldemort, an act that led to James and Lily's deaths. Sirius sought revenge on his new archenemy, Pettigrew, but during the confrontation, Pettigrew publicly accused Sirius of the Potters' deaths and murdered twelve Muggles before turning into a rat, thereby framing Sirius for the betrayal of the Potters, as well as for his own murder and that of the Muggles. Pettigrew hid during the next twelve years, masquerading as a rat. He eventually became Ron Weasley's pet, named Scabbers.

In Harry Potter and the Prisoner of Azkaban, Sirius confronts Pettigrew in the Shrieking Shack, where Lupin and Black compel him to resume his human form. Pettigrew confesses his treachery, claiming to have committed it only to save his own life. With Sirius and Lupin about to take their revenge, Harry begs Sirius to turn Pettigrew over to the Ministry of Magic instead, to prove Sirius' innocence. Pettigrew escapes while being led out of the Shack when Lupin transforms into a werewolf. Harry's actions result in Pettigrew owing him a life debt. This would be the reason behind Pettigrew (fruitlessly) trying to convince Voldemort to use the blood of another wizard when Voldemort wanted to use Harry's blood to restore his corporeal form in the next book.

Pettigrew returns to the service of Voldemort and helps him to return to a feeble baby's body. Pettigrew assists Barty Crouch Jr in overpowering Mad-Eye Moody, setting up the events in the fourth book, Harry Potter and the Goblet of Fire. In the climactic confrontation in that book, Pettigrew murders Cedric Diggory on Voldemort's orders, and brews the complex potion to regenerate Voldemort, severing his hand as one of the ingredients. Upon his return to corporeal form, Voldemort replaces Pettigrew's missing hand with a silver one that possesses five intact fingers and great strength. In Harry Potter and the Deathly Hallows, Pettigrew is tasked with keeping watch over prisoners in the cellar of Malfoy Manor. While Harry and Ron are being kept there, Pettigrew checks on the prisoners and is attacked. Pettigrew begins strangling Harry with the silver hand, but when reminded by Harry that he once saved his life, Pettigrew hesitates for a moment. The silver hand turns against him and strangles him to death as punishment for his moment of pity.

In the films, Pettigrew is portrayed by Timothy Spall as an adult and by Charles Hughes as a teenager. He appears in a flashback in Harry Potter and the Deathly Hallows – Part 2.

=== Severus Snape ===
Severus Snape is characterised as a person of considerable complexity, whose coldly sarcastic and controlled exterior conceals deep emotions and anguish. In the first novel of the series, Snape is a teacher who is hostile from the start toward Harry and is built up to be the primary antagonist due to his rivalry with Harry's father until the final chapters. As the series progresses, Snape's portrayal evolves from that of a malicious and partisan teacher to that of a complex, pivotal character of moral ambiguity, whose true loyalties are not revealed until the end. With the Death Eaters, Snape kills Dumbledore with the Killing Curse to prevent Draco from murdering him under Dumbledore's order. Snape is, as revealed in Harry Potter and the Deathly Hallows, actually a spy in Voldemort's ranks for Dumbledore. He is later slaughtered by Voldemort and Nagini. His life was seen by Harry, showing Snape's life as a student in Hogwarts and his love for Harry's mother. Alan Rickman plays Severus Snape in all eight movies.

=== Antonin Dolohov ===
Antonin Dolohov is the brutal-faced Death Eater who is present in the battle in which Snape killed Dumbledore. He is one of the more prominent Death Eaters, and one of Voldemort's spies in the Ministry of Magic. In Harry Potter and the Deathly Hallows, Dolohov is invited to Malfoy Manor to witness the murder of Charity Burbage, and argues with Snape about the correct date of Harry's departure from the Dursleys', but John Dawlish, an Auror who is tricked by an Order member, gives him incorrect information.

Yaxley places the Imperius Curse upon Pius Thicknesse, the Head of the Department of Magical Law Enforcement. He uses a unanamed purple curse the other major department heads and they allow Voldemort to murder Rufus Scrimgeour; thus Thicknesse becomes Minister for Magic.

When Harry, Ron, and Hermione, disguised as ministry officials, enter the Ministry to find Slytherin's locket, it is revealed that Yaxley has become Head of Magical Law Enforcement. He also assists Dolores Umbridge in leading the Muggle-Born Registration Commission, and the two seem to have a good relationship, together humiliating the Muggle-borns. Both are immobilised by Harry, but Yaxley recovers and grabs Hermione while she is Apparating her friends to safety. Yaxley arrives with them at Grimmauld Place, thus revealing their headquarters, but not the location to which the trio subsequently apparate.

He participates in the Battle of Hogwarts, where he duels with Professor Flitwick and is later seen among those who wait with Voldemort for Harry Potter to come to him, mistakenly believing that Harry would not come within the allotted time. When the battle resumes, he is defeated by George Weasley and Lee Jordan.

Peter Mullan appears as Yaxley in the film adaptation of Deathly Hallows.
