= Suzie Toase =

British actress (born 1979)

Suzie Toase or Suzanne Toase (born 1979) is a British actress who is possibly best known for her role as Alecto Carrow in the film adaptations of J. K. Rowling's Harry Potter and the Half-Blood Prince and Harry Potter and the Deathly Hallows – Part 1 and Part 2.

She also appeared in Season 3, Episode 5 of The IT Crowd, "Friendface", as Alison, a crying, Joker-esque ex-girlfriend of Roy. She has also appeared in an episode of Hotel Babylon.

Trained as a dancer at the London Studio Centre, Toase has had numerous lead roles in stage productions, including Little Red Riding Hood and The Wizard of Oz. She has appeared in One Man, Two Guvnors at the Adelphi Theatre in London, which also enjoyed a successful run on Broadway.

== Filmography ==
- Harry Potter and the Half-Blood Prince (2009) - Alecto Carrow (Death Eater)
- Harry Potter and the Deathly Hallows – Part 1 (2010) - Alecto Carrow (Death Eater)
- Harry Potter and the Deathly Hallows – Part 2 (2011) - Alecto Carrow (Death Eater)
- National Theatre Live: One Man, Two Guvnors (2011) - Dolly
