= Quidditch =

Fictional sport from Harry Potter

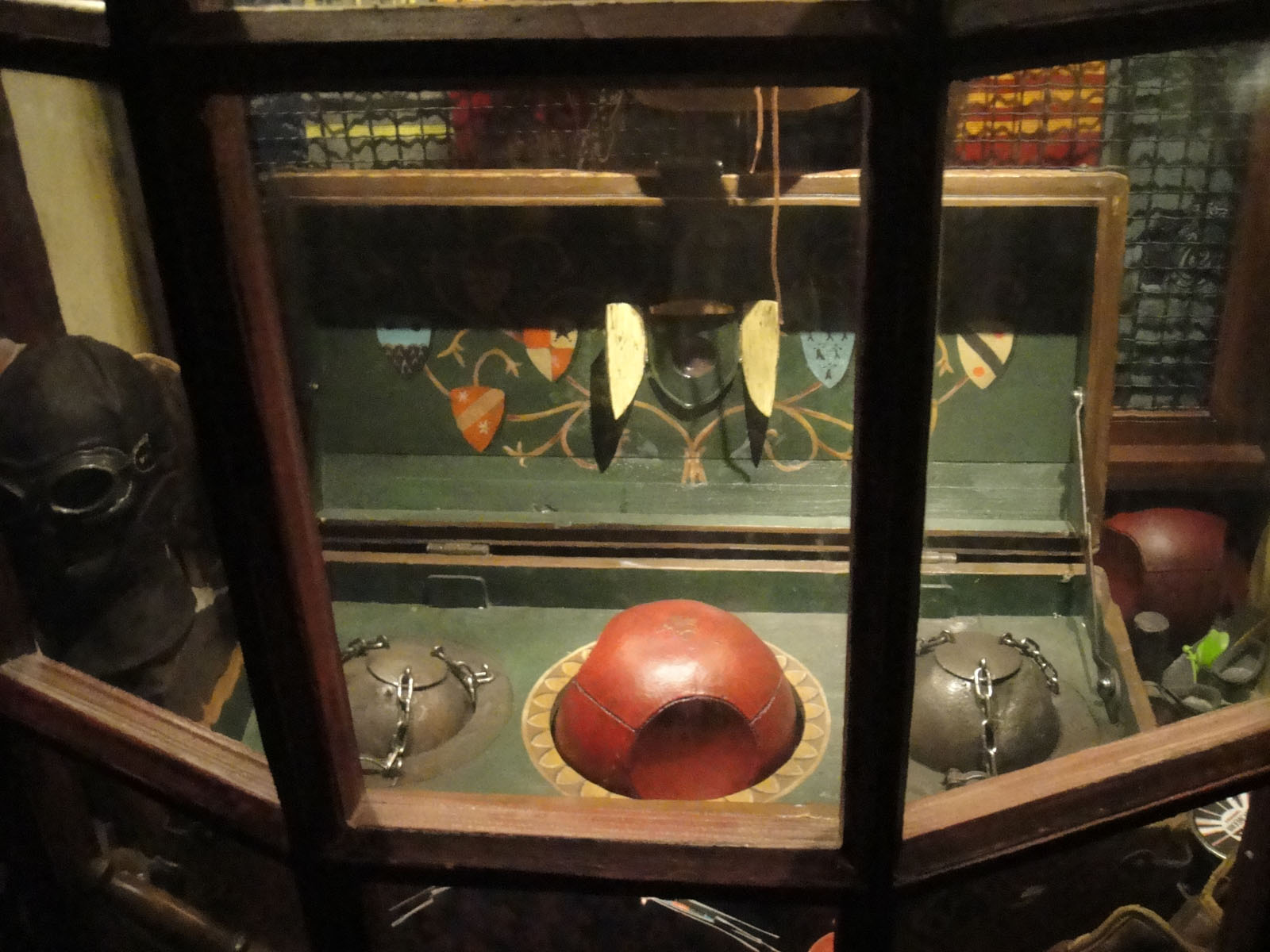
- Quidditch gear at The Wizarding World of Harry Potter in California

Characteristics
- Contact: Full
- Mixed-sex: Yes
- Equipment: Quaffle; Bludgers; Snitch; Broomsticks; Clubs
- Venue: Quidditch pitch

Quidditch (/ˈkwɪdɪtʃ/) is a fictional sport invented by author J. K. Rowling for her fantasy book series Harry Potter. It first appeared in the novel Harry Potter and the Philosopher's Stone (1997). In the series, Quidditch is portrayed as a dangerous but popular sport played by witches and wizards riding flying broomsticks.

Matches are played on a large oval pitch with three ring-shaped goals of different heights on each side, between two opposing teams of seven players each: three Chasers, two Beaters, the Keeper, and the Seeker. The Chasers and the Keeper, respectively, score with and defend the goals against the Quaffle; the two Beaters bat the Bludgers away from their teammates and towards their opponents; and the Seeker locates and catches the Golden Snitch, whose capture simultaneously wins the Seeker's team 150 points and ends the game. The team with the most points at the end wins.

Harry Potter plays as Seeker for his house team at Hogwarts. Regional and international Quidditch competitions are mentioned throughout the series. Aspects of the sport's history are revealed in Quidditch Through the Ages, published by Rowling on 12 March 2001 to benefit Comic Relief.

A real-life version of the game has been created, in which the players use brooms, but run instead of flying.

== Development ==
Rowling came up with the sport in a Manchester hotel room after an argument with her then-boyfriend. She explained: "I had been pondering the things that hold a society together, cause it to congregate and signify its particular character and knew I needed a sport." Rowling claims that the word "Quidditch" is not derived from any particular etymological root but was the result of filling five pages of a notebook with different words beginning with "Q".

Despite the sport's popularity with fans, Rowling grew to dislike describing the matches. She commented in an interview:

To be honest with you, Quidditch matches have been the bane of my life in the Harry Potter books. They are necessary in that people expect Harry to play Quidditch, but there is a limit to how many ways you can have them play Quidditch together and for something new to happen.

The final Quidditch scene in the books appears in Harry Potter and the Half-Blood Prince. Rowling experienced "fiendish glee" writing this scene, which features memorable commentary by Luna Lovegood.

Quidditch is introduced in Harry Potter and the Philosopher's Stone and is a regularly recurring feature throughout the first six books. It is depicted as being played by both professionals (as in tournaments like the Quidditch World Cup) and amateurs. A major motif of five of the Harry Potter books is the competition among the four Hogwarts houses for the Quidditch Cup each school year – in particular, the rivalry between Gryffindor and Slytherin.

In 2014, Rowling started publishing a series of match reports from the Quidditch World Cup on Pottermore, culminating in a short story about the final featuring the return of Harry, Ron, Hermione and their friends as adults. This generated interest from several media outlets, as it was the first new writing about the Harry Potter characters since the end of the series in 2007.

Rowling published Quidditch Through the Ages in 2001 to benefit Comic Relief; Quidditch Through The Ages Illustrated Edition was published in 2020, with banners being presented to 11 towns in the UK and Ireland that in the books have Quidditch teams, including the Ballycastle Bats, Falmouth Falcons, Holyhead Harpies, Montrose Magpies, Pride of Portree and Wigtown Wanderers; two teams based in fictional places, the Chudley Cannons and Puddlemere United, were also celebrated.

=== Game progression ===
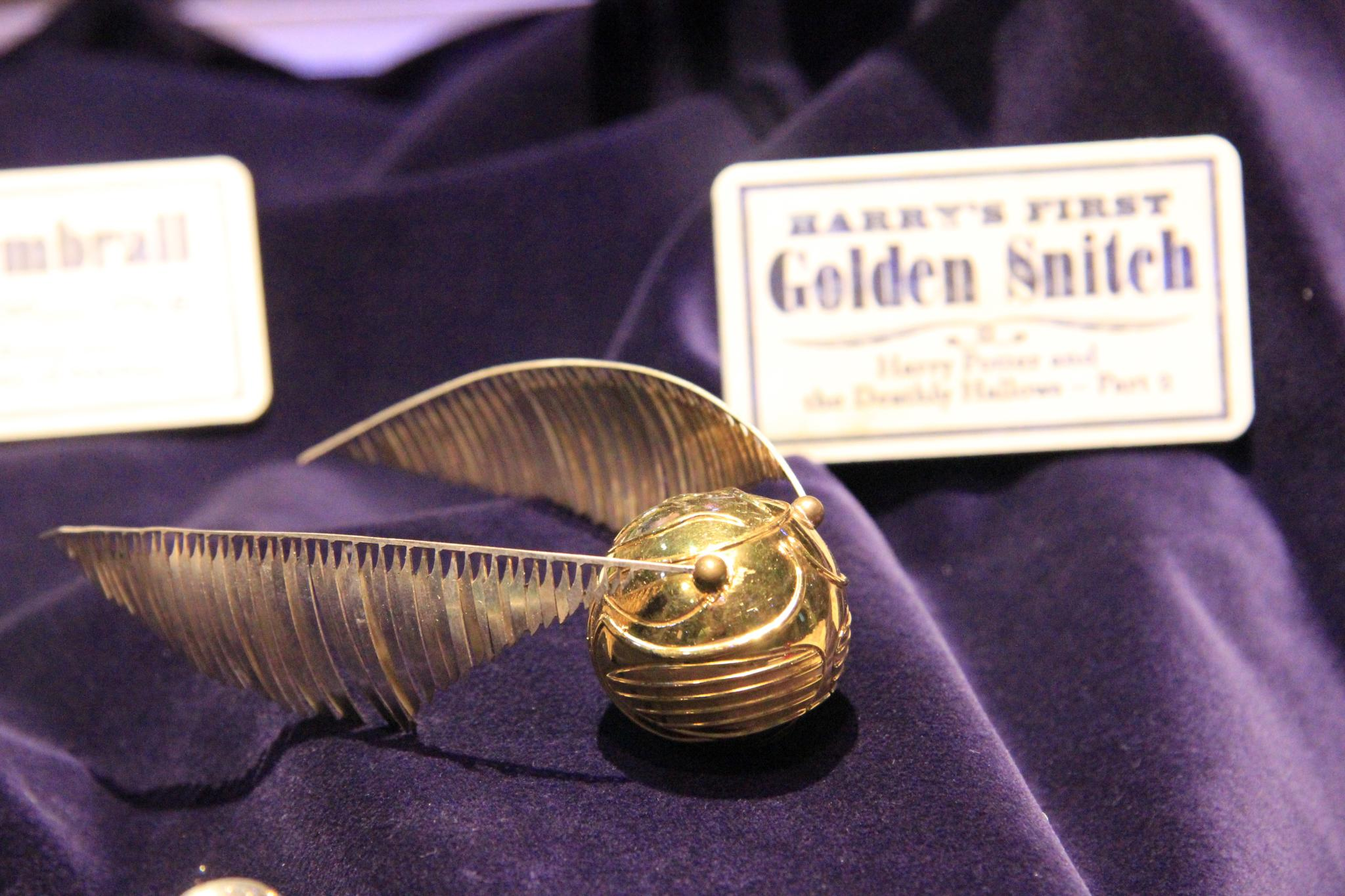
The Golden Snitch

- Quidditch matches are played over an oval-shaped pitch, with a scoring area at each end consisting of three hooped goal posts, each at a different height. Each team is made up of seven players, consisting of three Chasers, two Beaters, one Keeper and one Seeker.
- The job of the Chasers is to keep possession of the scarlet Quaffle, a leather ball passed between fellow chasers. They must attempt to score goals (worth 10 points) by throwing it through one of the opponents' three hoops. These hoops are defended by the opposing team's Keeper, who tries to block their goals and throw the "Quaffle" to fellow chasers.
- Meanwhile, players of both teams are attacked indiscriminately by the two Bludgers. These are round, jet-black balls made of iron that fly around violently trying to knock players off their brooms. It is the Beaters' job to defend their teammates from the Bludgers; they carry short wooden clubs, which they use to knock the Bludgers away from their teammates and/or toward the opposing team.
- Finally, the role of the Seeker is to catch the Golden Snitch. This is a small golden ball the approximate size of a walnut. The winged Snitch is enchanted to hover, dart, and fly around the pitch rapidly, avoiding capture while remaining within the boundaries of the playing area. A Seeker catching the Snitch ends the game and scores the successful Seeker's team an additional 150 points (15 goals). As the team with the most points wins, this often guarantees victory for the successful Seeker's team. A notable exception is when Bulgaria Seeker Viktor Krum catches the Snitch for Bulgaria during the World Cup Final in Goblet of Fire, while his team are still 160 points behind Ireland (their opponents), thus making his own team lose by only 10 points.

=== Broomsticks ===
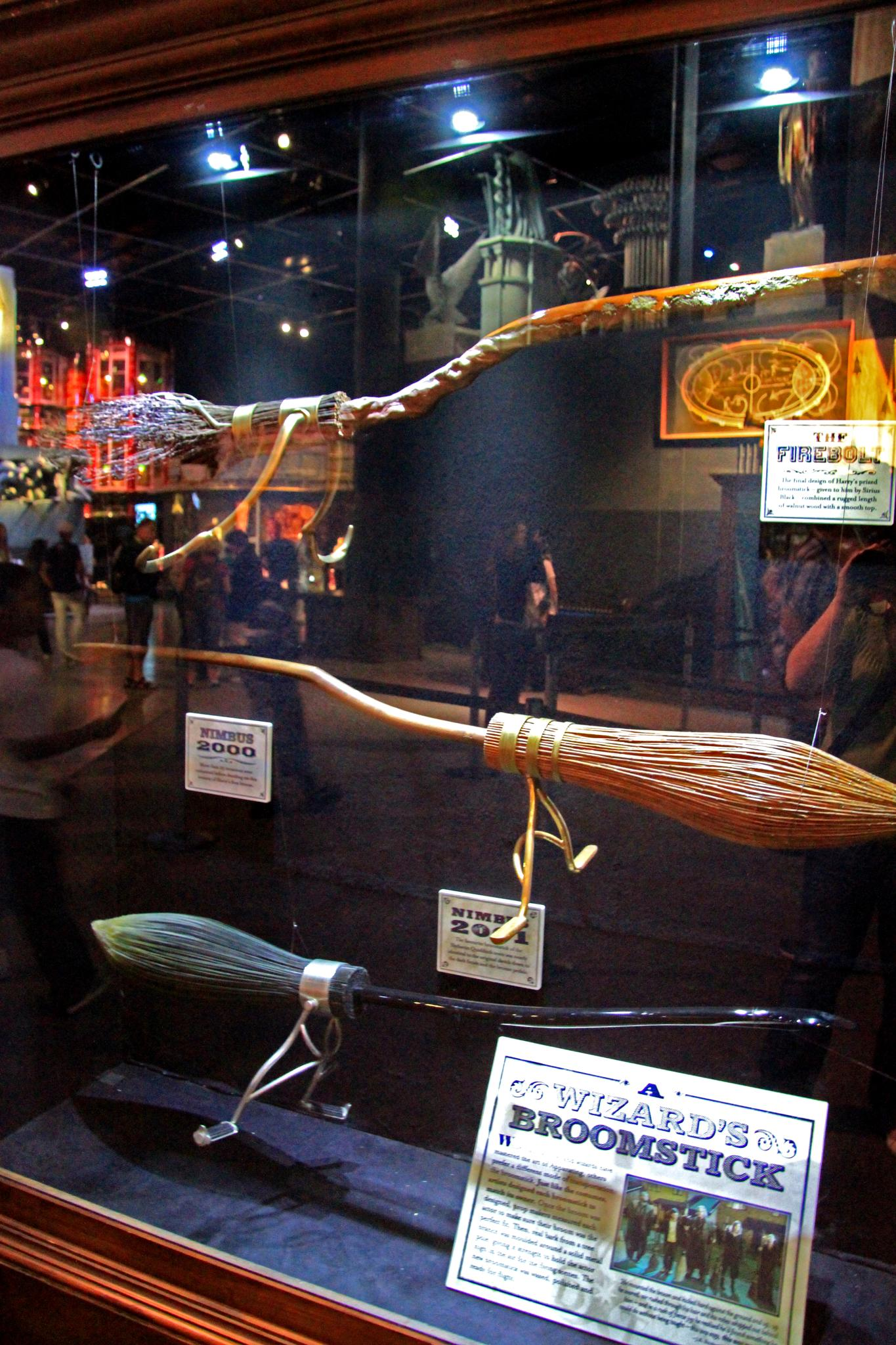
The broomsticks made as merchandise by Warner Bros.

Broomsticks are one of the forms of transportation for wizards and witches and are also used for playing Quidditch. The three most prominent broomsticks in the books are the Nimbus 2000, Nimbus 2001, and the Firebolt, all three of which have been produced as merchandise by Warner Bros.

The Nimbus is introduced as one of the best broomsticks in the wizarding world. Harry receives a Nimbus 2000 in Philosopher's Stone so that he can play for Gryffindor house. In Chamber of Secrets, Lucius Malfoy buys a full set of the more advanced Nimbus 2001s for the Slytherin team as a bribe, so they would choose his son Draco as Seeker that year.

The Firebolt later supersedes the Nimbus as the fastest and one of the most expensive racing brooms in existence. Harry receives a Firebolt model from his godfather, Sirius Black, after his Nimbus 2000 is destroyed during a Quidditch match in Prisoner of Azkaban. In Goblet of Fire, Harry uses his Firebolt to escape the Hungarian Horntail during the Triwizard Tournament.

=== Films and video games ===
Quidditch appears in five of the eight Harry Potter films. Some Quidditch subplots, such as Ron's Keeper storyline in Order of the Phoenix, were cut to save time in the films. Video games that feature Quidditch include:

- Main series' video game adaptions:
  - Harry Potter and the Philosopher's Stone
  - Harry Potter and the Chamber of Secrets
  - Harry Potter and the Half-Blood Prince
- Harry Potter: Quidditch series
  - Harry Potter: Quidditch World Cup
  - Harry Potter: Quidditch Champions
- Lego Harry Potter series
  - Lego Harry Potter: Years 1–4
  - Lego Harry Potter: Years 5–7

In the Harry Potter and the Forbidden Journey attraction in the Wizarding World of Harry Potter at the Islands of Adventure theme park, Quidditch is featured near the end where riders are flown through the Quidditch pitch. A storefront near Ollivanders Wand Shop is themed as a Quidditch supply with a Golden Snitch on the sign and a case containing animated Quaffle and Bludgers surrounded by Beaters' bats.

== Reception ==
According to David K. Steege, the books "follow very closely the school story tradition of making games and sports central to the boarding school experience; some of the most vivid and popular scenes in the series take place on the playing field".

Some critics have claimed that Rowling's presentation of Quidditch reinforces gender inequality. For example, Heilman and Donaldson argue that the female players ultimately have little impact on the outcome of the game, and it has also been noted that the female players on the Gryffindor Quidditch team have very few lines. In addition, D. Bruno Starrs notes Quidditch's rarity as a mixed-sex sport in which males and females compete against each other, and describes it as "levelling" the genders.

Quidditch has been criticised for its emphasis on catching the Snitch. Rowling claims that Quidditch is a sport that "infuriates" men in particular, who are bothered by the unrealistic scoring system. Because of the emphasis on the Snitch, legal scholar William Baude called Quidditch "a really stupid game".

== Non-fictional Quidditch ==
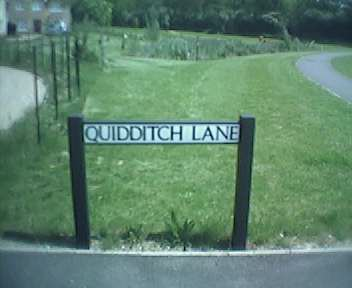
Quidditch Lane in Lower Cambourne

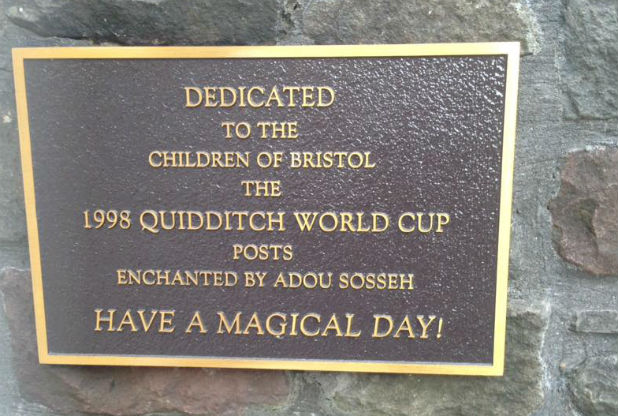
Dedication plaque outside the Bristol Royal Hospital for Children

In the real world, the word "Quidditch", long predating Harry Potter, occurs in some English placenames, and seems to come from Anglo-Saxon cwǣð-dīc = "mud-ditch".

A street in Lower Cambourne, Cambridgeshire, England is named Quidditch Lane, supposedly after a type of nearby dry ditch called a Quidditch. Fans have been known to visit the area.

In November 2014, a plaque appeared outside the entrance of Bristol Children's Hospital attesting that the famous hooped sculptures which stand in front of the paediatric institution are, in fact, not a 50-foot-tall (15 m) interactive installation inaugurated in 2001, but instead the goalposts used in the 1998 Quidditch World Cup.

In 2017, "Quidditch" was defined by Oxford Dictionaries, following the inclusion of "Muggle" in the third (2003) edition of the Oxford English Dictionary. Oxford Dictionaries associate editor Charlotte Buxton explained that Quidditch had gained recognition beyond the books, pointing to its existence as a real-life sport.

=== As a real-life sport ===
In 2007, the United States Quidditch Association, back then named the Intercollegiate Quidditch Association (or I.Q.A.), was founded to regulate quidditch in the United States and abroad, a very popular sport amongst college students. According to the International Quidditch Association, the current international governing body of the sport, the original rules and regulation of the popular collegiate sport known as quidditch were formed "... on a sunny Sunday afternoon in 2005 by Xander Manshel and Alex Benepe, students at Middlebury College in Vermont, US". In contrast to the fictional sport, the game is played on foot while using one hand to hold a broom between the legs.

Since 2005, many American schools, such as UC Berkeley, have added Quidditch to their list of team sports. In the United States, college teams compete in their respective regions and compete in an annual national tournament, last year held in Texas and won by The University of Texas over runner-ups, The University of California, Berkeley (Cal Quidditch). The sport has since then spread across more than 25 countries and includes multiple international tournaments, including a World Cup. In 2012, the International Quidditch Association held the IQA World Cup, then named the IQA Summer Games, as the torch was passing through Oxford, UK for the Summer Olympics.

Gameplay is based on the description in the books, films, and game adaptations, though the sport has been adapted to suit real-world constraints. Quidditch is still evolving to suit safe play for the members of the teams, male and female. Apart from joining teams registered with their national governing body, individuals are also able to become an official certified referee to officiate tournaments and games throughout the year as teams compete to take part in various national and international tournaments. As the oldest national governing body, USQ has hosted a grand total of ten US Quidditch Cups as of 2017.

In the United Kingdom, the Quidditch Premier League is played between 10 teams, split between the North and South divisions. In 2017, West Midlands Revolution won the QPL.

In response to allegations of J. K. Rowling's anti-trans positions, and Warner Bros.' ownership of the word "Quidditch", US Quidditch and Major League Quidditch announced in 2022 that they were renaming the sport "Quadball".

== See also ==
- List of fictional sports
- Harry Potter: Quidditch World Cup
