= James and Oliver Phelps =

British actors and identical twin brothers (born 1986)

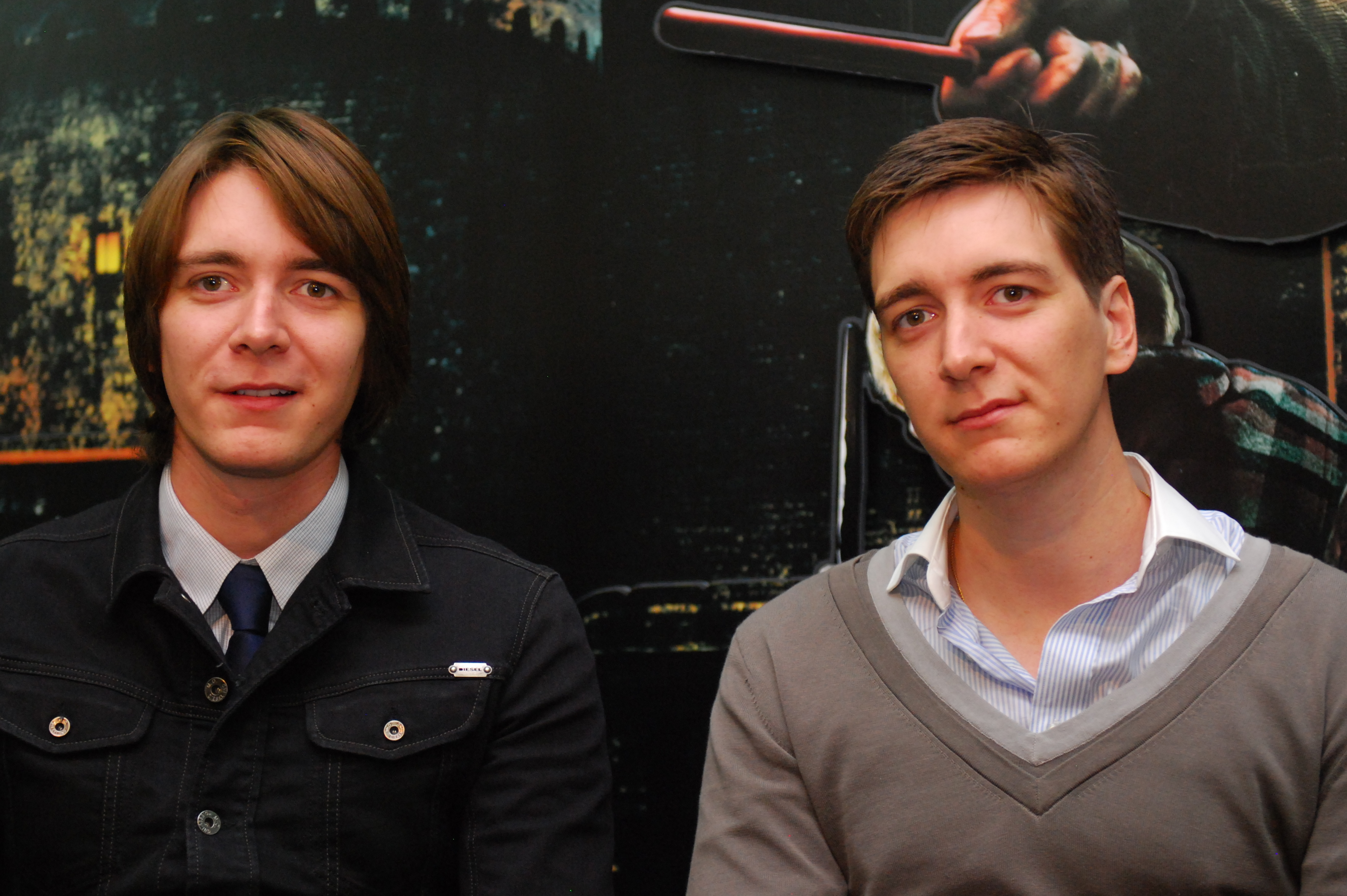
- James (left) and Oliver Phelps in 2011
- Born: James Andrew Eric Phelps; Oliver Martyn John Phelps; 25 February 1986 (age 40); Sutton Coldfield, Birmingham, England
- Occupations: Actors; podcasters
- Years active: 2000–present
- Spouses: James: Annika Ostle (m. 2016) Oliver: Katy Humpage (m. 2015)
- Children: Oliver: 2

James Andrew Eric Phelps and Oliver Martyn John Phelps (born 25 February 1986) are English actors, podcasters and identical twin brothers. They are known for playing Fred and George Weasley, respectively, in the Harry Potter film series from 2001 to 2011 and have continued to work together as a duo on other projects.

== Early lives ==
James and Oliver Phelps were born in the Sutton Coldfield area of Birmingham, England on 25 February 1986. They are the sons of Susan (née Spare) and Martyn Phelps. Oliver is the older of the two by 13 minutes. Growing up, the twins attended Little Sutton Primary School and the Arthur Terry Secondary School. During the filming of the Harry Potter series, the twins were tutored on set.

== Career ==
In 2000, despite having no previous acting experience, the twins skipped school to attend an open audition in Leeds. After about six auditions, the twins were cast as Fred and George Weasley in the film Harry Potter and the Philosopher's Stone. At the first table reading after being cast, James was given the role of Fred and Oliver was given the role of George. They played the characters in all eight films.

Outside of acting, James worked as a runner on the set of Harry Potter and the Half-Blood Prince and on The Da Vinci Code.

In 2009, the twins appeared as brothers in the fifth episode of the third season of the TV series Kingdom. In 2012, they starred in A Mind's Eye, a short documentary film based on the philosophical ideas of Plato, and they directed Journey along the Thames for the opening ceremony of the London 2012 Summer Olympics.

The twins have been involved in the Harry Potter Exhibition. They were present during its 2009 opening in Chicago and later toured various cities and countries to promote it.

In January 2014, the twins attended the Harry Potter Celebration in Orlando, Florida, along with Evanna Lynch, Matthew Lewis, and Devon Murray. They also made a LiveCast where they answered fans' questions and talked about the expansion at The Wizarding World of Harry Potter.

In 2024 the twins hosted Harry Potter: Wizards of Baking, a six-part competition show based on the Harry Potter franchise, for Food Network. They reprised this role for the show's second season in 2025.

=== Podcast ===
The twins collaborated on a podcast available on YouTube and various streaming services, including Spotify and iTunes. The first season, which premiered in 2017, featured James and Oliver discussing their previous travels.

The second season of the podcast was released in 2020 during quarantine, and the twins interviewed guests and spoke about their personal lives.

In 2021, they released a third season, titled "Normal Not Normal", on which they collaborated with Stabl production; this season is more structured and professionally edited compared to the previous season. In this season they discuss what normal really is and if it even exists. They have interviewed celebrities including Sasha Banks, Tom Hopper, Mara Wilson, as well as their former co-stars, such as Katie Leung, Evanna Lynch, and Alfie Enoch.

== Charity work and personal lives ==
In January 2003, the twins planted trees at the National Forest in Leicestershire. The trees were birch and ash—the same types of wood that helped make the broomsticks used in the Harry Potter films.

The twins are supporters of Teenage Cancer Trust, the "Celebrity World Cup Soccer Six", the Virgin Money Giving drive, and Cancer Research UK in Australia.

Oliver married Katy Humpage in 2015, and they have two daughters. James married Annika Ostle in 2016.

== Filmography ==
This filmography is of the twins as a duo. See James Phelps and Oliver Phelps for other productions in which they have appeared.

=== Film and television ===
Year	Title	James's role	Oliver's role	Notes
2001	Harry Potter and the Philosopher's Stone	Fred Weasley	George Weasley	
2002	Harry Potter and the Chamber of Secrets	Fred Weasley	George Weasley	
2004	Harry Potter and the Prisoner of Azkaban	Fred Weasley	George Weasley	
2005	Harry Potter and the Goblet of Fire	Fred Weasley	George Weasley	
2007	Harry Potter and the Order of the Phoenix	Fred Weasley	George Weasley	
2009	Kingdom	Callum Anderson	Finlay Anderson	Episode #3.5
2009	Harry Potter and the Half-Blood Prince	Fred Weasley	George Weasley	Assistant Director (James)
2010	Harry Potter and the Forbidden Journey	Fred Weasley	George Weasley	Short film Robocoaster at The Wizarding World of Harry Potter – Hogsmeade
2010	Harry Potter and the Deathly Hallows – Part 1	Fred Weasley	George Weasley	
2011	Harry Potter and the Deathly Hallows – Part 2	Fred Weasley	George Weasley	
2014	Own Worst Enemy	Constable Berrow	Constable Stroyde	
2014	Hogwarts Express	Fred Weasley	George Weasley	Short film Shuttle service between destinations at The Wizarding World of Harry Potter – Hogsmeade and Diagon Alley
2015	King of the Nerds	Himself	Himself	Guest Appearance(s) episode 7
2015	Danny and the Human Zoo	Mr Brian Carter	Mr Barry Carter	TV film
2019	7 days The Story of "Blind Dave" Heeley	Captain Williams	Dr. Mathews	Short Film
2021	Last Night in Soho	Cloakroom attendant	Cloakroom attendant	
2022–	Fantastic Friends	Himself	Himself	Travel series
2024-2025	Harry Potter: Wizards of Baking	Himself	Himself	Cooking show

=== Video games ===
Year	Title	James's role	Oliver's role	Note
2007	Harry Potter and the Order of the Phoenix	Fred Weasley (voice)	George Weasley (voice)	Video game
2010	Harry Potter and the Deathly Hallows – Part 1	Fred Weasley (voice)	George Weasley (voice)	Video game

== See also ==
- List of twins
