= James Phelps (actor) =

British actor

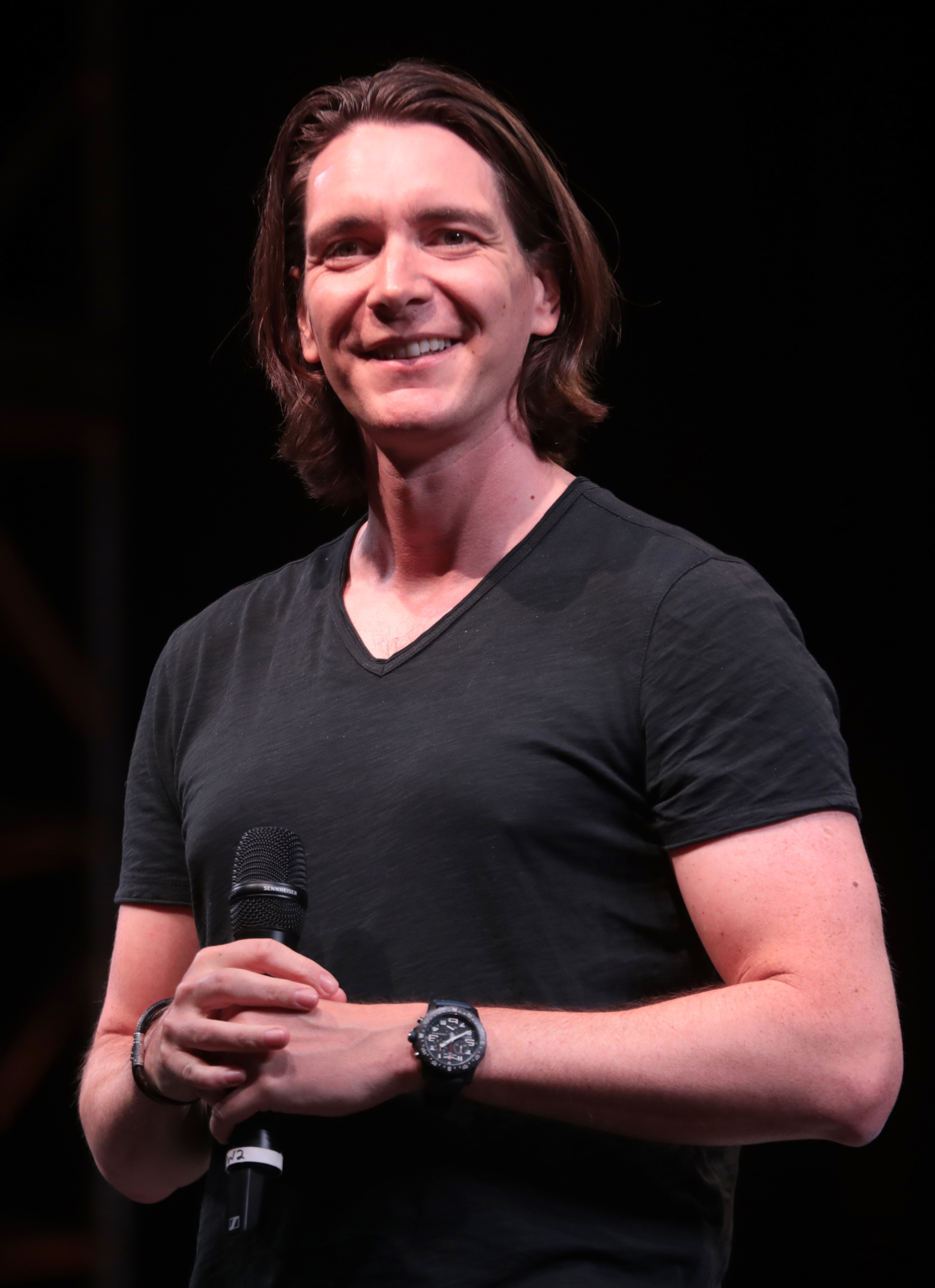
- Phelps in 2023
- Born: James Andrew Eric Phelps; 25 February 1986 (age 40); Sutton Coldfield, Birmingham, England
- Occupations: Actor; podcaster
- Years active: 2000–present
- Spouse: Annika Ostle (m. 2016)
- Relatives: Oliver Phelps (brother)

James Andrew Eric Phelps (born 25 February 1986) is an English actor and podcaster. He is known for playing Fred Weasley in the Harry Potter film series from 2001 to 2011, alongside his twin brother, Oliver Phelps, who played George Weasley. The twins have continued to work together as a duo on other projects.

== Early life ==
James Phelps was born in the Sutton Coldfield area of Birmingham, England, on 25 February 1986, 13 minutes after his brother, Oliver Phelps. They are the only children of Susan (née Spare) and Martyn Phelps. Growing up, James and his brother attended Little Sutton Primary School and the Arthur Terry Secondary School. During the filming of the Harry Potter series, the twins were tutored on set.

== Career ==
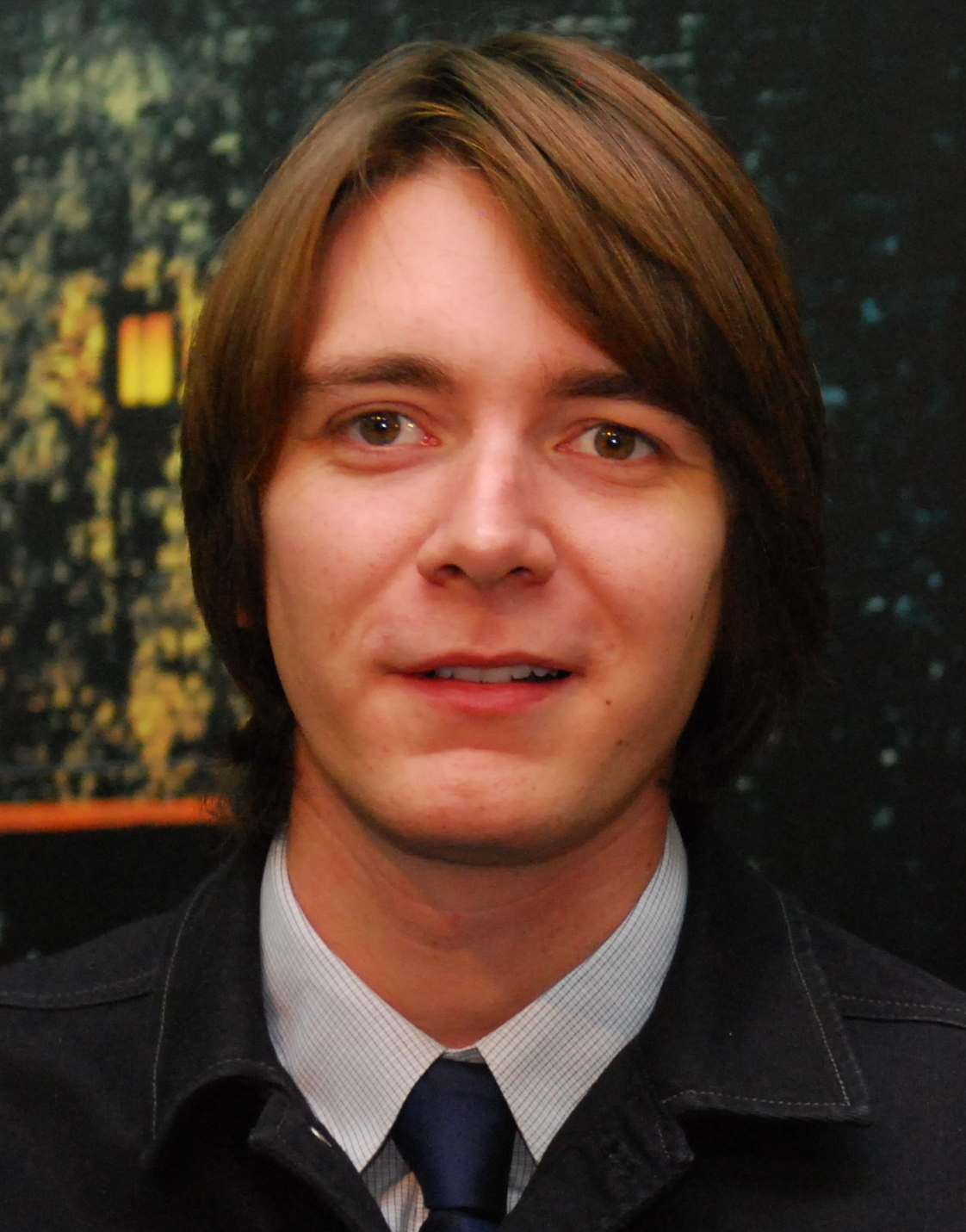
Phelps in 2011.

In 2000, despite having no previous acting experience, the twins skipped school to attend an open audition in Leeds. After about six auditions, the twins were cast as Fred and George Weasley in the film Harry Potter and the Philosopher's Stone. At the first table reading after being cast, James was given the role of Fred and Oliver was given the role of George.

Outside of acting, James Phelps worked as a runner on the set of Harry Potter and the Half-Blood Prince and on The Da Vinci Code.

In 2009, the twins appeared as brothers in the fifth episode of the third season of the TV series Kingdom. In 2012, they starred in A Mind's Eye, a short documentary film based on the philosophical ideas of Plato.

The twins have also been involved in the Harry Potter Exhibition. They were present during its 2009 opening in Chicago and later toured various cities and countries to promote it.

In January 2014, the twins attended the Harry Potter Celebration in Orlando, Florida along with Evanna Lynch, Matthew Lewis, and Devon Murray. They also made a LiveCast where they answered fans' questions and talked about the expansion at The Wizarding World of Harry Potter.

Phelps guest-starred in one episode of British television drama Silent Witness, which aired on 6 January 2015.

In 2019, he starred in fantasy movie Cadia: The World Within, and was also credited as associate producer on the project.

=== Podcast ===
Phelps has collaborated with his brother on a podcast, which was launched on YouTube and various streaming services, including Spotify and iTunes.

The first season, which premiered in 2017, featured James and Oliver discussing their previous travels.

The second season of the podcast was released in 2020 during quarantine, and the twins interviewed guests and spoke about their personal lives.

In 2021, they released a third season, titled "Normal Not Normal", on which they collaborated with Stabl production; this season is more structured and professionally edited compared to the previous season. In this season, they discuss what normal really is and if it even exists. They have interviewed celebrities including Sasha Banks, Tom Hopper, and Mara Wilson, as well as their former costars, such as Katie Leung, Evanna Lynch, and Alfred Enoch.

== Personal life and philanthropy ==
Phelps married Annika Ostle in 2016. They have two dogs named Tonto and Jason. In 2023, Phelps ran the London Marathon to raise awareness for endometriosis, in support of Ostle, who suffers from the disease. He finished with a time of 4:46:24.

In January 2003, Phelps and his brother planted trees at the National Forest, in Leicestershire. The trees were birch and ash, the same types of wood that helped make the broomsticks used in the Harry Potter films.

The twins are supporters of Teenage Cancer Trust, the "Celebrity World Cup Soccer Six", the Virgin Money Giving drive, and Cancer Research UK in Australia.

== Filmography ==
=== Film and television ===
Year	Title	Role	Notes
2001	Harry Potter and the Philosopher's Stone	Fred Weasley	
2002	Harry Potter and the Chamber of Secrets	Fred Weasley	
2004	Harry Potter and the Prisoner of Azkaban	Fred Weasley	
2005	Harry Potter and the Goblet of Fire	Fred Weasley	
2007	Harry Potter and the Order of the Phoenix	Fred Weasley	
2009	Kingdom	Callum Anderson	Episode #3.5
2009	A Mind's Eye	Stanley too	Short Film
2009	Harry Potter and the Half-Blood Prince	Fred Weasley	also Assistant Director
2010	Harry Potter and the Forbidden Journey	Fred Weasley	Short film Robocoaster at The Wizarding World of Harry Potter – Hogsmeade
2010	Harry Potter and the Deathly Hallows – Part 1	Fred Weasley	
2011	Harry Potter and the Deathly Hallows – Part 2	Fred Weasley	
2012	Ward 3	Jimmy	
2012	The Turn	Morris Talliver	Short film
2014	Own Worst Enemy	Constable Berrow	
2014	Hogwarts Express	Fred Weasley	Short film Shuttle service between destinations at The Wizarding World of Harry Potter – Hogsmeade and Diagon Alley
2015	King of the Nerds	Himself	Guest Appearance(s) episode 7
2015	Silent Witness	Chris	Season 18, Episode 1 – Sniper's Nest: Part 1
2015	Danny and the Human Zoo	Mr Brian Carter	TV film
2015	Patchwork	Garret	Film
2019	7 days The Story of "Blind Dave" Heeley	Captain Williams	Short Film
2019	Cadia: The World Within	Tanion	Associate producer credit
2021	Last Night in Soho	Cloakroom attendant	
2022	Brigantia	Koün the fisherman	Pre-production
2022	Fantastic Friends	Himself	Travel show
2022	Harry Potter 20th Anniversary: Return to Hogwarts	Himself	HBO Max Special
2023	Bloody Fury	Duke	Short Film
2024	Harry Potter: Wizards of Baking	Himself	Warner Bros Reality show
2026	The Traitors	Castlekeeper	

=== Video games ===
Year	Title	Role	Note
2007	Harry Potter and the Order of the Phoenix	Fred Weasley (voice)	Video game
2010	Harry Potter and the Deathly Hallows – Part 1	Fred Weasley (voice)	Video game
