= NPAS =

NPAS or NpAs may refer to:

- National Performing Arts School, in Dublin, Ireland
- National Police Air Service, of England and Wales
- National Public Alerting System, in Canada
- NpAs, chemical formula of neptunium arsenide
