= The Turn (film) =

- Directed by: Christian Krohn
- Written by: Christian Krohn
- Produced by: Adam Jackson
- Starring: Tim Bentinck; James Phelps; Richard Rycroft
- Cinematography: Annette Remler
- Music by: Samuel Pegg
- Release date: 2012
- Running time: 20 minutes
- Country: United Kingdom
- Language: English

The Turn is a 2012 short film, written and directed by Christian Krohn. It stars James Phelps in one of his first roles since playing Fred Weasley in the Harry Potter film series. The film also stars Tim Bentinck and Richard Rycroft.

The film is about faded comedian Stanley Kovack (Tim Bentinck). After a lull in success, he becomes desperate and steals the notes and material from a young, upcoming comedian Morris Talliver (James Phelps), whilst they are performing together at The Comedy Club, London. The success that follows is in stark contrast to the fortunes of Morris, whose career takes a resulting downward turn.

== Cast ==
- James Phelps as Morris Talliver
- Tim Bentinck as Stanley Kovack
- Richard Rycroft as George
- Graham Dickson as Arthur Penn
- Rob Tofield as the Heckler
- Andrew Pugsley as Tom
- James Ivens as Henry
- Lewis Allcock as the Bartender
- Nicholas Anscombe as the BBC Booker
- Roger Parkins as a Comedian
- Callum Hale as a Comedian
