= Arthur Terry School =

The Arthur Terry School
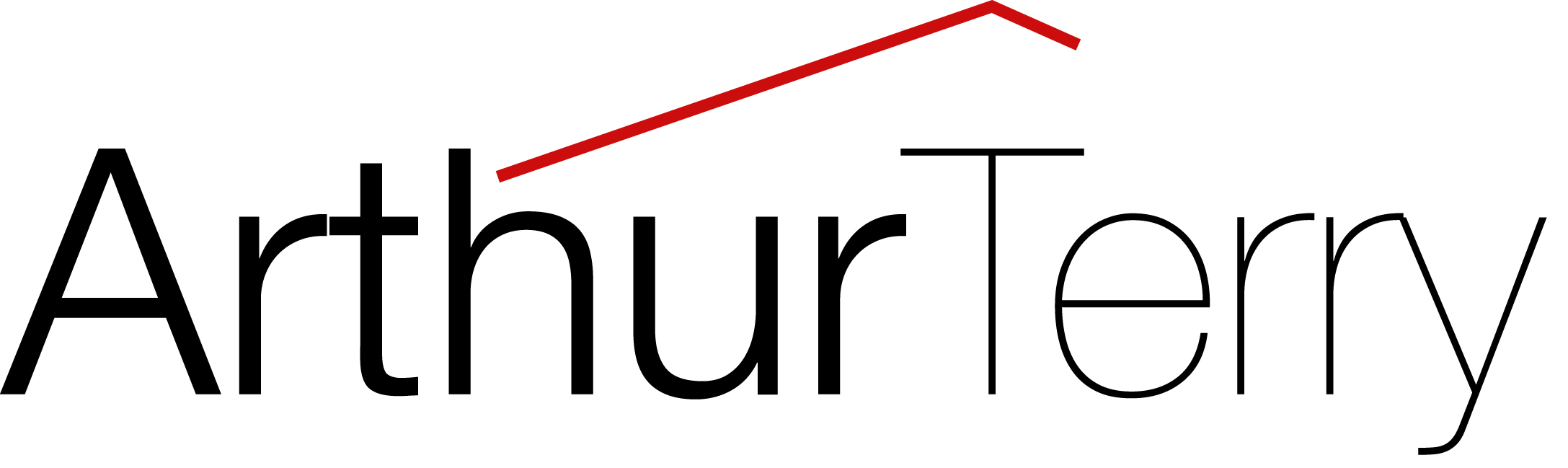

Location
- Kittoe Road; Four Oaks, West Midlands, B74 4RZ; England; 52.58892°N 1.83682°W

Information
- Type: Academy
- Motto: Be Proud. Be Kind. Be Ready.
- Established: 1963
- Local authority: Birmingham
- Specialist: National Teaching School
- Department for Education URN: 138136 Tables
- Ofsted: Reports
- Chair of Governors: Andrew Wood
- Headteacher: Jo Fairclough
- Gender: Co-educational
- Age: 11 to 18
- Houses: Lincoln, Gloucester, Hereford and York.
- Website: http://www.arthurterry.bham.sch.uk

The Arthur Terry School is a secondary school and sixth form with academy status in the Four Oaks area of Sutton Coldfield, England. It is Ofsted Good and was an Arts College before the Specialist Schools initiative was made defunct. The school's headteacher is Jo Fairclough. It is part of the Arthur Terry Learning Partnership.

== Admissions ==
It is situated south of the Butlers Lane railway station, between Four Oaks and Mere Green. It is north of the B4151, which is between the A454 and A5127. This school focuses on performing arts.

== History ==
=== Bi-lateral school ===
The school was built in 1963 (opening on 10 September) and was named after Arthur Terry, who was the Mayor of Sutton Coldfield from 1934 to 1935. It was sometimes known as the Arthur Terry Grammar/High School, with around 950 boys and girls. Boys were required to wear bow ties, with a light shade of bronze; this was the idea of the head master, Dennis Lindley. The uniform was initially popular. Knitted nylon conventional ties were equally allowed, and eventually replaced the bow tie due to their greater popularity with wearers.

It was run by Warwickshire Education Committee, specifically the excepted district of the Borough of Sutton Coldfield. It was a bilateral school with a grammar stream, similar to a grammar school. From April 1974 it was administered by Birmingham City Council.

=== Comprehensive ===
In March 1999, BBC Radio 4's Music Machine programme came from the school, interviewing the clarinettist Emma Johnson.

The school underwent a £15 million rebuilding program, designed by architects Watkins Gray International, that saw most of the original school demolished to make way for the new buildings; only the Sports Hall, Drama Studio and Sixth Form Centre have remained.

=== Academy ===
The school became an academy in August 2012, and is no longer under LA control, However the school continues to co-ordinate admission with Birmingham LA.

=== Headteacher ===
Jo Fairclough has been headteacher since April 2025. She has been in education for over twenty years.

== Activities ==
The school has its own student-run radio station, ATRfm, which broadcasts internally.

The school has been criticised, amongst several other British schools, for making use of the Brain Gym 'mental exercise' programme, which claims that 'the brain is a muscle' and that a set of hand and leg movements and chest rubs can promote learning. Commonly described as pseudoscience, physician Ben Goldacre has described the programme as 'ludicrous' while Teacher of the Year award-winner Philip Beadle described it as 'moonshine...you'd probably get as much benefit from taking a Brain Gym book and booting it around the room'.

== Academic performance ==
Arthur Terry is consistently the highest performing comprehensive school in Birmingham according to DfE league tables for KS4 and is in the top 10% nationally for mixed community comprehensive schools.

In 2012, it was chosen to become one of the first National Teaching Schools.

== Notable alumni ==
- Duncan Gibbins, TV Presenter and film Director. Was a pupil at the school from the day it opened, living on Kittoe Road.
- James and Oliver Phelps, actors portraying Fred and George Weasley in the eight film adaptations of the Harry Potter series, by J.K Rowling
