= Oliver Phelps (actor) =

British actor

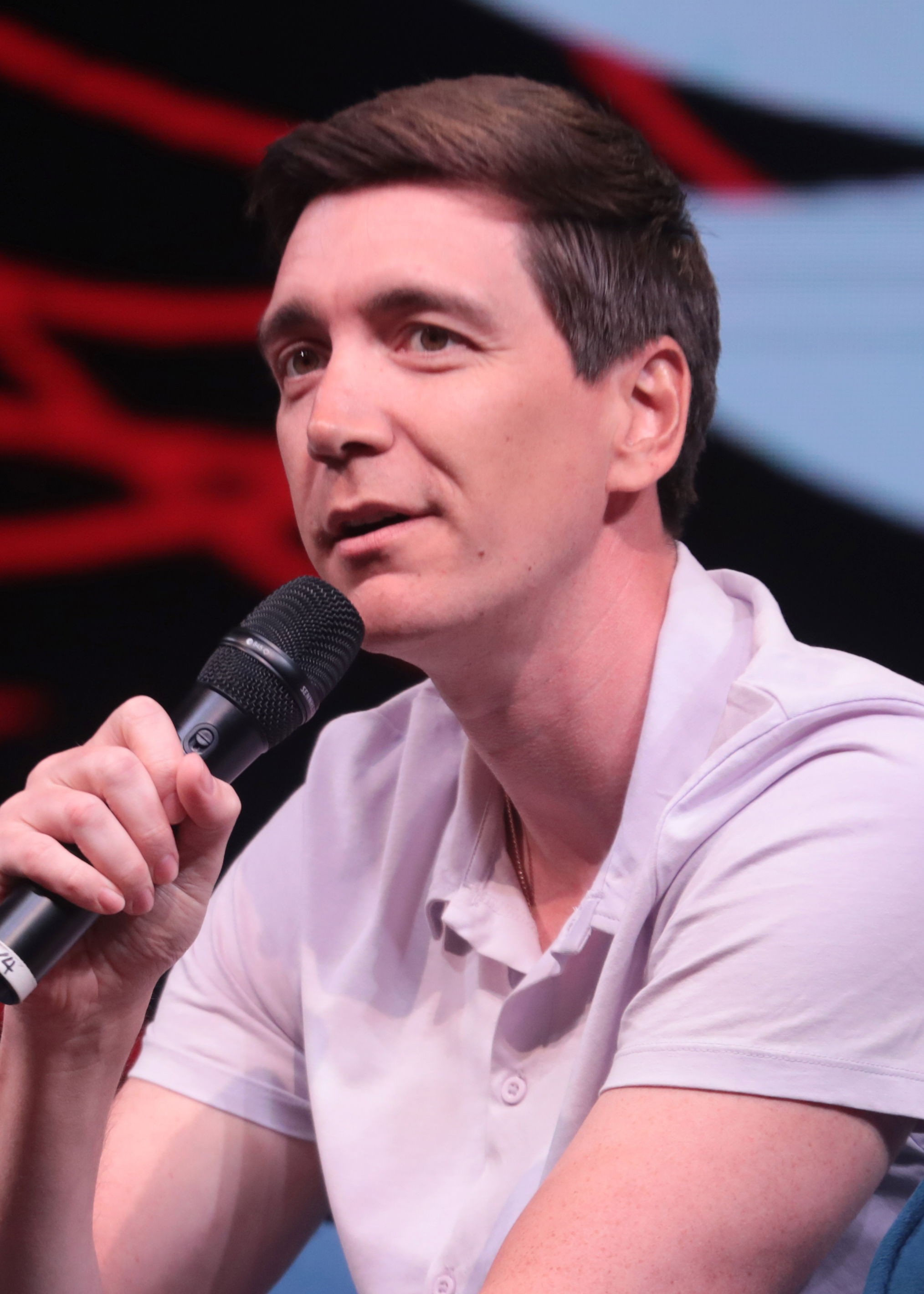
- Phelps at the 2023 Phoenix Fan Fusion
- Born: Oliver Martyn John Phelps; 25 February 1986 (age 40); Sutton Coldfield, Birmingham, England
- Occupations: Actor; podcaster
- Years active: 2000–present
- Spouse: Katy Humpage (m. 2015)
- Children: 2
- Relatives: James Phelps (brother)

Oliver Martyn John Phelps (born 25 February 1986) is an English actor and podcaster. He is known for playing George Weasley in the Harry Potter film series from 2001 to 2011, alongside his twin brother, James Phelps, who played Fred Weasley. The twins have continued to work together as a duo on other projects.

== Early life ==
Oliver Phelps was born in the Sutton Coldfield area of Birmingham, England on 25 February 1986, 13 minutes before his brother James. They are the only children of Susan (née Spare) and Martyn Phelps. Growing up, Oliver and his brother attended Little Sutton Primary School and the Arthur Terry Secondary School. During the filming of the Harry Potter series, the twins were tutored on set.

== Career ==
In 2000, despite having no previous acting experience, the twins skipped school to attend an open audition in Leeds. After about six auditions, the twins were cast as Fred and George Weasley in the film Harry Potter and the Philosopher's Stone. At the first table reading after being cast, Oliver was given the role of George and James was given the role of Fred.

In 2009, the twins appeared as brothers in the fifth episode of the third season of the TV series Kingdom. In 2012, they starred in A Mind's Eye, a short documentary film based on the philosophical ideas of Plato.

The twins have also been involved in the Harry Potter Exhibition. They were present during its 2009 opening in Chicago and later toured various cities and countries to promote it.

In January 2014, the twins attended the Harry Potter Celebration in Orlando, Florida along with Evanna Lynch, Matthew Lewis, and Devon Murray. They also made a LiveCast where they answered fans' questions and talked about the expansion at The Wizarding World of Harry Potter.

Oliver Phelps made his stage debut in 2018, in a production of The Case of the Frightened Lady (based on a novel of the same name by Edgar Wallace) at the Grand Opera House, York. He shared the stage with fellow actor Deborah Grant.

=== Podcast ===
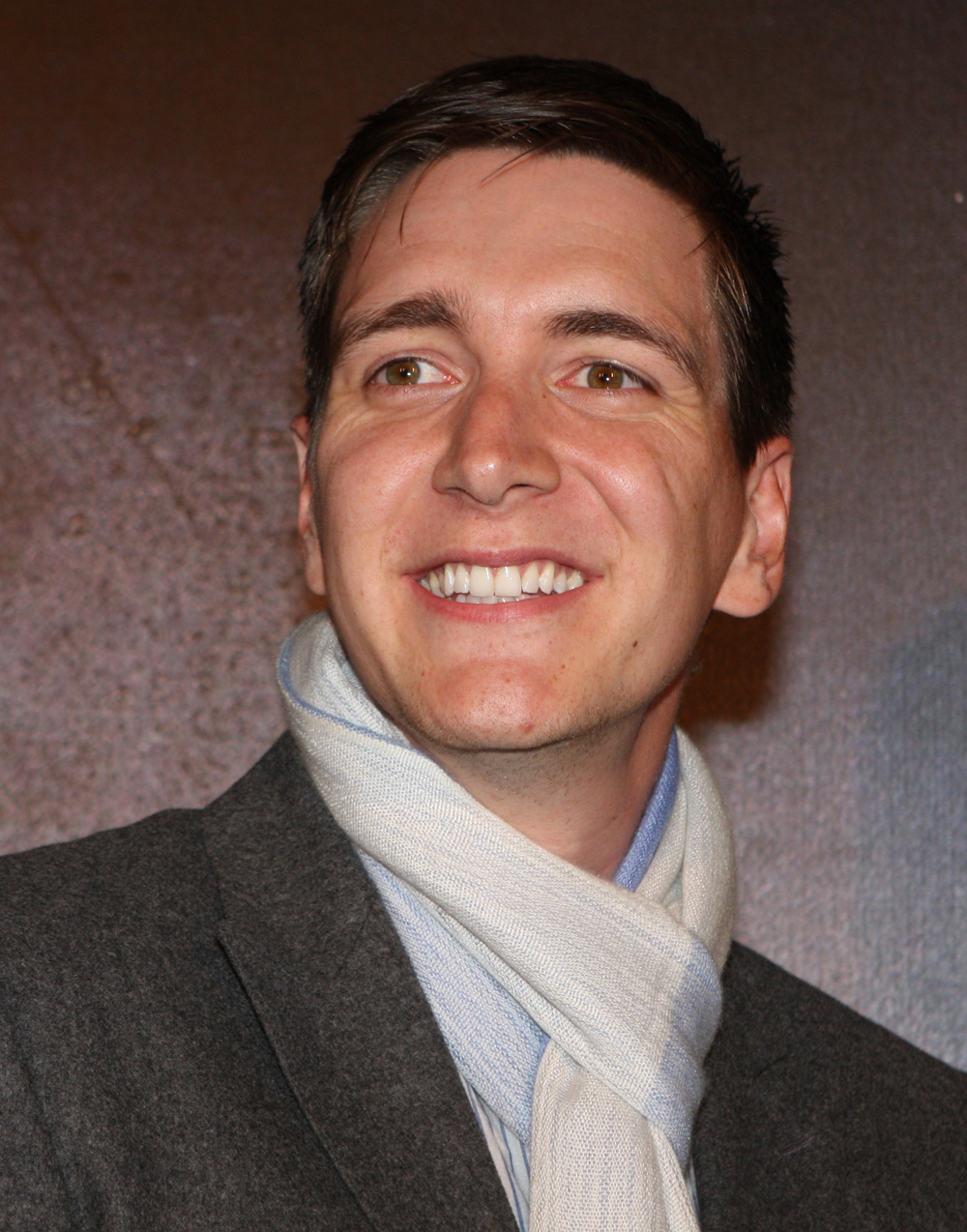
Phelps at Man of Steel red carpet movie premiere, Sydney, 2013

Phelps has also collaborated with his brother on a podcast, which was launched on YouTube and various streaming services, including Spotify and iTunes.

The first season, which premiered in 2017, featured James and Oliver discussing their previous travels.

The second season of the podcast was released in 2020 during quarantine, and the twins interviewed guests and spoke about their personal lives.

In 2021, they released a third season, titled "Normal Not Normal", on which they collaborated with Stabl production; this season is more structured and professionally edited compared to the previous season. In this season they discuss what normal really is and if it even exists. They have interviewed celebrities including Sasha Banks, Tom Hopper, Mara Wilson, as well as their former co-stars, such as Katie Leung, Evanna Lynch, and Alfie Enoch.

== Personal life and philanthropy ==
Phelps married Katy Humpage in 2015. They have two daughters named Autumn and Emilia.

In January 2003, Oliver and his brother planted trees at the National Forest, in Leicestershire. The trees were birch and ash—the same types of wood that helped make the broomsticks used in the Harry Potter films.

The twins are supporters of Teenage Cancer Trust, the "Celebrity World Cup Soccer Six", the Virgin Money Giving drive, and Cancer Research UK in Australia.

== Filmography ==
=== Film and television ===
Year	Title	Role	Notes
2001	Harry Potter and the Philosopher's Stone	George Weasley	
2002	Harry Potter and the Chamber of Secrets	George Weasley	
2004	Harry Potter and the Prisoner of Azkaban	George Weasley	
2005	Harry Potter and the Goblet of Fire	George Weasley	
2007	Harry Potter and the Order of the Phoenix	George Weasley	
2009	Kingdom	Finlay Anderson	Episode #3.5
2009	A Mind's Eye	Stanley	Short Film
2009	Harry Potter and the Half-Blood Prince	George Weasley	
2010	Harry Potter and the Forbidden Journey	George Weasley	Short film Robocoaster at The Wizarding World of Harry Potter – Hogsmeade
2010	Harry Potter and the Deathly Hallows – Part 1	George Weasley	
2011	Harry Potter and the Deathly Hallows – Part 2	George Weasley	
2013	Ears	Mr Ears	Short Film
2014	Own Worst Enemy	Constable Stroyde	
2014	Hogwarts Express	George Weasley	Short film Shuttle service between destinations at The Wizarding World of Harry Potter – Hogsmeade and Diagon Alley
2015	King of the Nerds	Himself	Guest Appearance(s) episode 7
2015	Danny and the Human Zoo	Mr. Barry Carter	TV film
2019	7 days The Story of "Blind Dave" Heeley	Dr. Mathews	Short Film
2021	Last Night in Soho	Cloakroom attendant	
2022	Harry Potter 20th Anniversary: Return to Hogwarts	Himself	HBO Max Special
2022	Fantastic Friends	Himself	Travel Show
2024	Harry Potter: Wizards of Baking	Himself	Warner Bros Reality show
2026	The Traitors	Castlekeeper	

=== Video games ===
Year	Title	Role	Note
2007	Harry Potter and the Order of the Phoenix	George Weasley (voice)	Video game
2010	Harry Potter and the Deathly Hallows – Part 1	George Weasley (voice)	Video game

=== Stage ===
Year	Title	Role	Note
2018	The Case of the Frightened Lady	Detective Sergeant Totti	Play based on a book by Edgar Wallace.
