= Richard Rycroft =

English actor and comedian (born 1960)

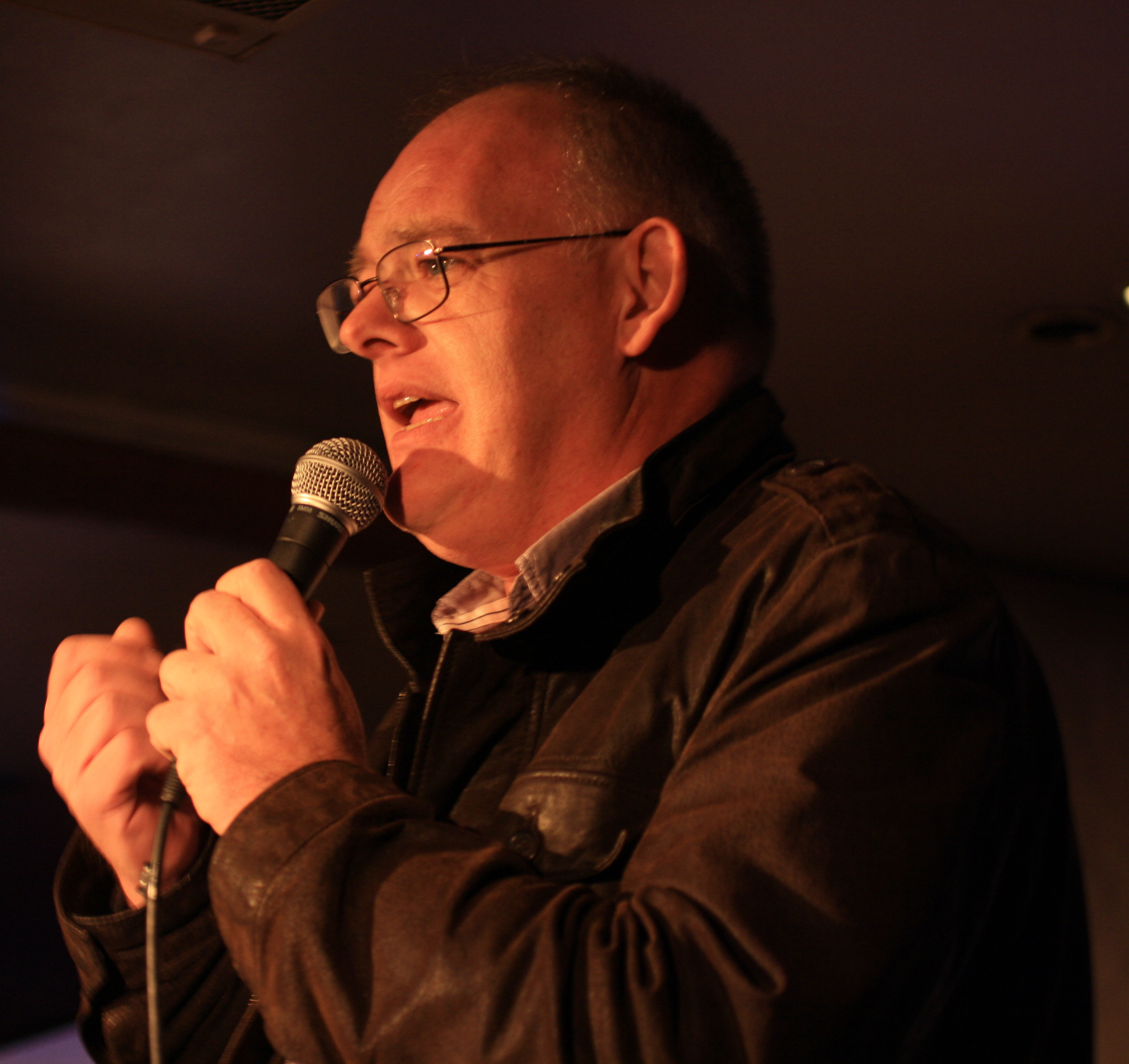
- Rycroft in 2010
- Born: 28 June 1960 (age 65); Gravesend, Kent, England
- Occupations: Actor, comedian
- Years active: 2001–present

Richard Rycroft (born 28 June 1960) is an English actor and comedian, best known for his role as Maester Wolkan on the HBO series Game of Thrones.

== Career ==
Rycroft first started his acting career in 2001. He has appeared in several British drama television series, including: EastEnders, Casualty, Holby City and Doctors. He also featured in the films The Turn and Bridget Jones's Baby. In August 2007, he started stand-up comedy, and was a finalist in both the Laughing Horse New Act of the Year and the Hackney Empire New Act of the Year competitions in 2010.

In 2016, he joined the cast of Game of Thrones, appearing in the sixth, seventh and eighth seasons as Maester Wolkan. His other work includes parts in the television series Wolf Hall, Secret Smile, Not Going Out and Apple Tree Yard. In 2017, he lent his voice to the Fighting Fantasy audio dramas, in which he voiced the character Throm.

== Filmography ==
=== Film ===
Year	Title	Role	Notes
2001	Feeling Lucky	Owen	(Short)
2004	Belly Button	Martin	(Short)
2004	Feedback	Mr. Jones	
2005	Planespotting	Planespotter	(TV Movie)
2005	Heatwave	Brian Lancashire	(TV Movie)
2012	The Turn	George	(Short)
2013	Resting	Pub Manager	(Short)
2015	In Memory	Mr. Michaels (voice)	(Short)
2016	Bridget Jones's Baby	Election Official	
2019	Greed	Publisher	

=== Television ===
Year	Title	Role	Notes
2002–2005	Casualty	Thomas Banks / Barry	3 episodes
2003	EastEnders	Mr. Broughton	1 episode
2005	Doctors	Reg Peacock	1 episode
2005	Secret Smile	Brendan's Lawyer	1 episode
2009	Holby City	Dennis Johnson	1 episode
2014	Not Going Out	Dougal	1 episode
2015	Wolf Hall	Speaker of the House	1 episode
2015	Drunk History	Boss 2 / Albert's friend	2 episodes
2015	Mr Selfridge	Shareholder	1 episode
2015	Charity Starts at Home	John	4 episodes
2016–2019	Game of Thrones	Maester Wolkan	12 episodes
2017	Apple Tree Yard	MP	1 episode
2018–2020	The Self-Tapers	Gerald Dorrington	2 episodes
2022–2023	The Crown	George Carey	4 episodes
