= Billie Barry =

Irish singer, dancer and choreographer

Lillian "Billie" Barry (27 January 1921 – 30 September 2014) was an Irish singer, dancer and choreographer who founded the Billie Barry Stage School in 1964.

== Background ==
Billie Barry was born in Drumcondra, Dublin, Ireland, one of 15 children. Her father, John Clarke-Barry, was a respected musician who took part in many orchestras. Her mother was an amateur operatic singer. Lillian, later known as "Billie", began performing as a singer at the age of five. She later joined the Barry Sisters singing group, which toured Ireland and the UK.

== Career ==
She started the stage school after her husband Paddy was diagnosed with multiple sclerosis. Paddy died the following year.

Billie Barry became a household name in Ireland due to the success the school enjoyed. Notable pupils include Angeline Ball, Susan McFadden, Brian McFadden, Mikey Graham (of Boyzone), Samantha Mumba, Hilda Fay, Lisa Lambe, Ruth-Anne Cunningham, Devon Murray, Sharon Jones, and Jacinta Whyte.

Billie Barry was awarded a "Living Legend" Award in 2010 from the Variety Club of Ireland.
