= Last Night in Soho =

2021 British film by Edgar Wright

- Theatrical release poster
- Directed by: Edgar Wright
- Screenplay by: Edgar Wright; Krysty Wilson-Cairns
- Story by: Edgar Wright
- Produced by: Nira Park; Tim Bevan; Eric Fellner; Edgar Wright
- Starring: Thomasin McKenzie; Anya Taylor-Joy; Matt Smith; Rita Tushingham; Michael Ajao; Terence Stamp; Diana Rigg
- Cinematography: Chung Chung-hoon
- Edited by: Paul Machliss
- Music by: Steven Price
- Production companies: Focus Features; Film4; Working Title Films; Complete Fiction Pictures
- Distributed by: Universal Pictures
- Release dates: 4 September 2021 (Venice); 29 October 2021 (United Kingdom & Ireland and North America)
- Running time: 116 minutes
- Country: United Kingdom
- Language: English
- Budget: $43 million
- Box office: $23 million

Last Night in Soho is a 2021 British psychological horror film directed and co-produced by Edgar Wright, and co-written by Wright and Krysty Wilson-Cairns. It stars Thomasin McKenzie as a naive teenager who moves to London to study fashion design; there she is haunted by visions of Sandie (played by Anya Taylor-Joy), a glamorous young woman who had lived during the Swinging Sixties. The cast also features Matt Smith, Terence Stamp, Rita Tushingham, and Michael Ajao, with Diana Rigg and Margaret Nolan in their final film roles. Rigg and Nolan died in 2020, and the film is dedicated to their memories.

Following its premiere at the 78th Venice International Film Festival on 4 September 2021, Last Night in Soho was released theatrically in the United Kingdom and the United States on 29 October 2021 by Universal Pictures and Focus Features, respectively. It received generally positive reviews from critics, who praised its technical aspects, direction and performances, while its writing received some criticism (especially the ending). The film grossed $23 million worldwide on a budget of $43 million. The film was nominated for two BAFTA Film Awards, including Outstanding British Film and Best Sound.

== Plot ==
Eloise "Ellie" Turner, a sweet and naive teenager with troubled mental health, loves the music and fashion of the Swinging Sixties and dreams of becoming a fashion designer. Her mother, who was a fashion designer, committed suicide when Ellie was a child, so Ellie was raised by her maternal grandmother. She occasionally sees her mother's ghost in mirrors, something her grandmother is aware of.

Ellie moves from her rural home near Redruth, Cornwall, to London to study at the London College of Fashion, where she has trouble fitting in with her peers, especially her bullying roommate Jocasta. Only John, the only male student, is kind to her. Unhappy in the dormitory, she moves into a bedsit owned by the elderly Ms. Collins.

That night, Ellie has a vivid dream where she is transported back to the 1960s. At the Café de Paris, she observes a confident young blonde woman, Sandie, inquire about becoming a singer at the club. Sandie begins a relationship with the charming teddy boy manager, Jack. The next morning, Ellie designs a dress inspired by Sandie and discovers a love bite on her neck.

Ellie has another dream in which Sandie auditions at a Soho nightclub, arranged by Jack, before returning to the same bedsit that Ellie is renting. Inspired by these visions, Ellie dyes her hair blonde, changes her fashion style to match Sandie's, and gets a job at a pub. She is observed by a silver-haired man who recognises her similarities to Sandie. In further dreams, Ellie discovers Sandie is not living the life she had hoped for, now being pimped by Jack to his male business associates.

In her waking life, Ellie is disturbed by increasingly menacing apparitions that resemble Jack and the men who exploited and used Sandie. After she has a vision of Jack seemingly murdering Sandie, she decides to track down the silver-haired man, who she believes is Jack. She goes to the police but is not taken seriously, though the kindly female detective expresses concerns for her wellbeing. She tries to find newspaper reports about Sandie's murder. Instead, she finds stories of local men who vanished without a trace. Believing she must avenge Sandie, Ellie confronts the silver-haired man. He denies killing Sandie and leaves the pub but is struck by a taxi and killed. Ellie's boss later reveals that the man's name was Lindsey, not Jack. Ellie recalls encountering him in her dreams; he was an undercover vice officer who tried to encourage Sandie to escape her life of prostitution.

Panicked, Ellie goes to inform Ms. Collins that she is leaving London. Ms. Collins tells her she knows she went to the police because the "nice police lady" came to check up on her. She then reveals that she is Sandie; Ellie's vision of Sandie's death was actually a vision of Sandie killing Jack when he threatened her with a knife. Sandie then lured the men she was pimped to back to her room and killed them, hiding their bodies in the house's floorboards and walls. Ms. Collins drugs Ellie's tea with the intention of killing her to ensure her silence.

In the ensuing scuffle, Ellie knocks over an ashtray and starts a fire. John comes to Ellie's aid, but Ms. Collins stabs him and continues after Ellie, who hallucinates Ms. Collins as the younger Sandie, and that they are ascending a glass staircase. Ellie kicks Ms. Collins, sending her down the stairs. She flees to her room, where the spirits of Sandie's abusers plead with her to avenge them, but she refuses. Ms. Collins enters Ellie's room, where she also sees the spirits and is struck by "Jack". With the police outside, she attempts suicide but Ellie stops her, understanding why she did what she did. Sandie tells Ellie to save John and herself, remaining in the building as it burns.

Ellie enjoys success as her designs are showcased at her end-of-year fashion show and is congratulated by her grandmother and John. Ellie sees her mother smile at her in a mirror. Sandie then also appears in a mirror and blows her a kiss.

== Cast ==
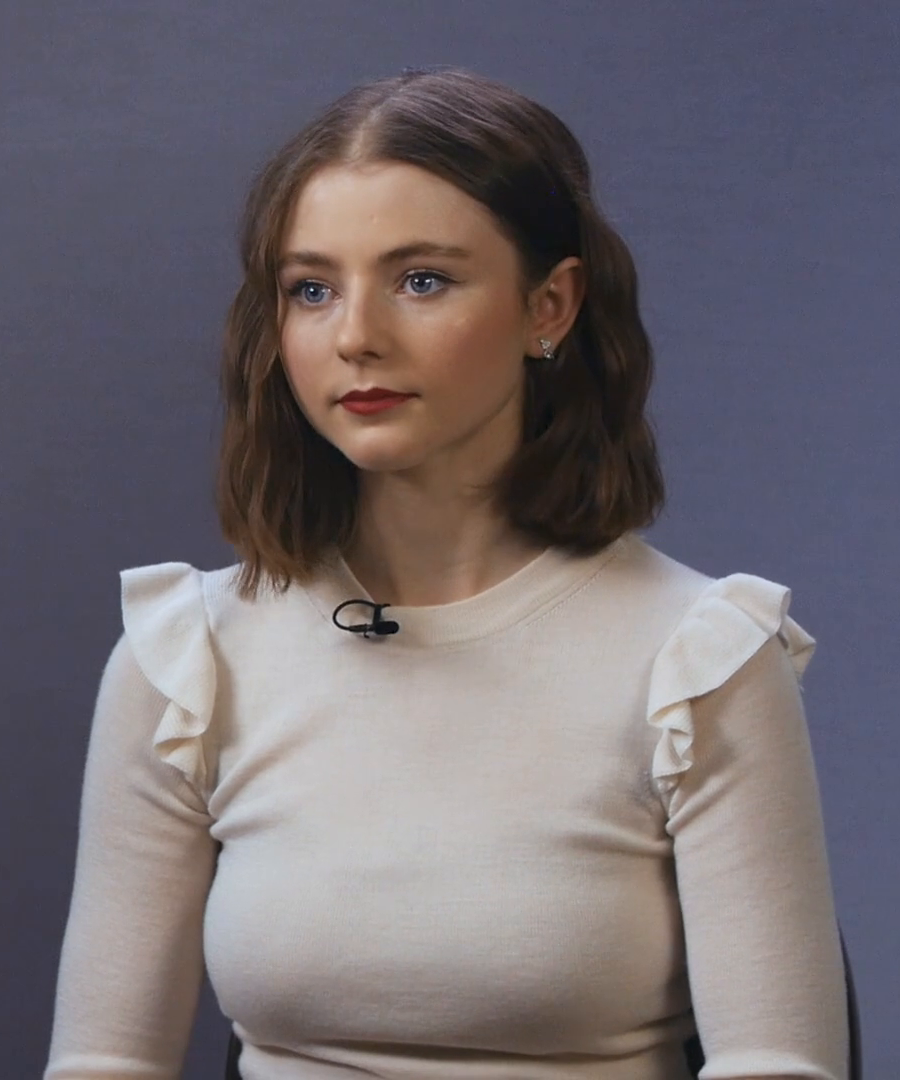
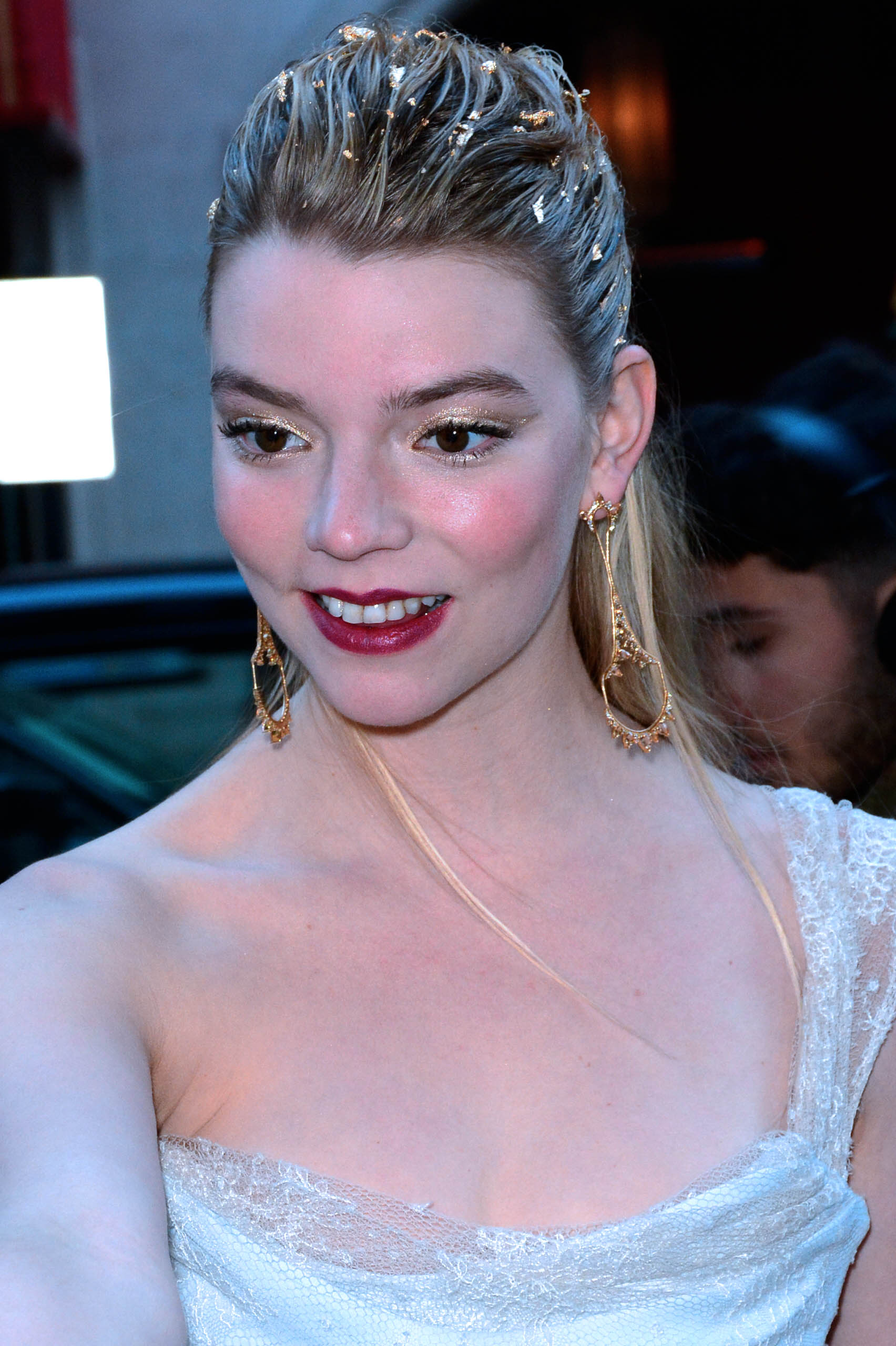
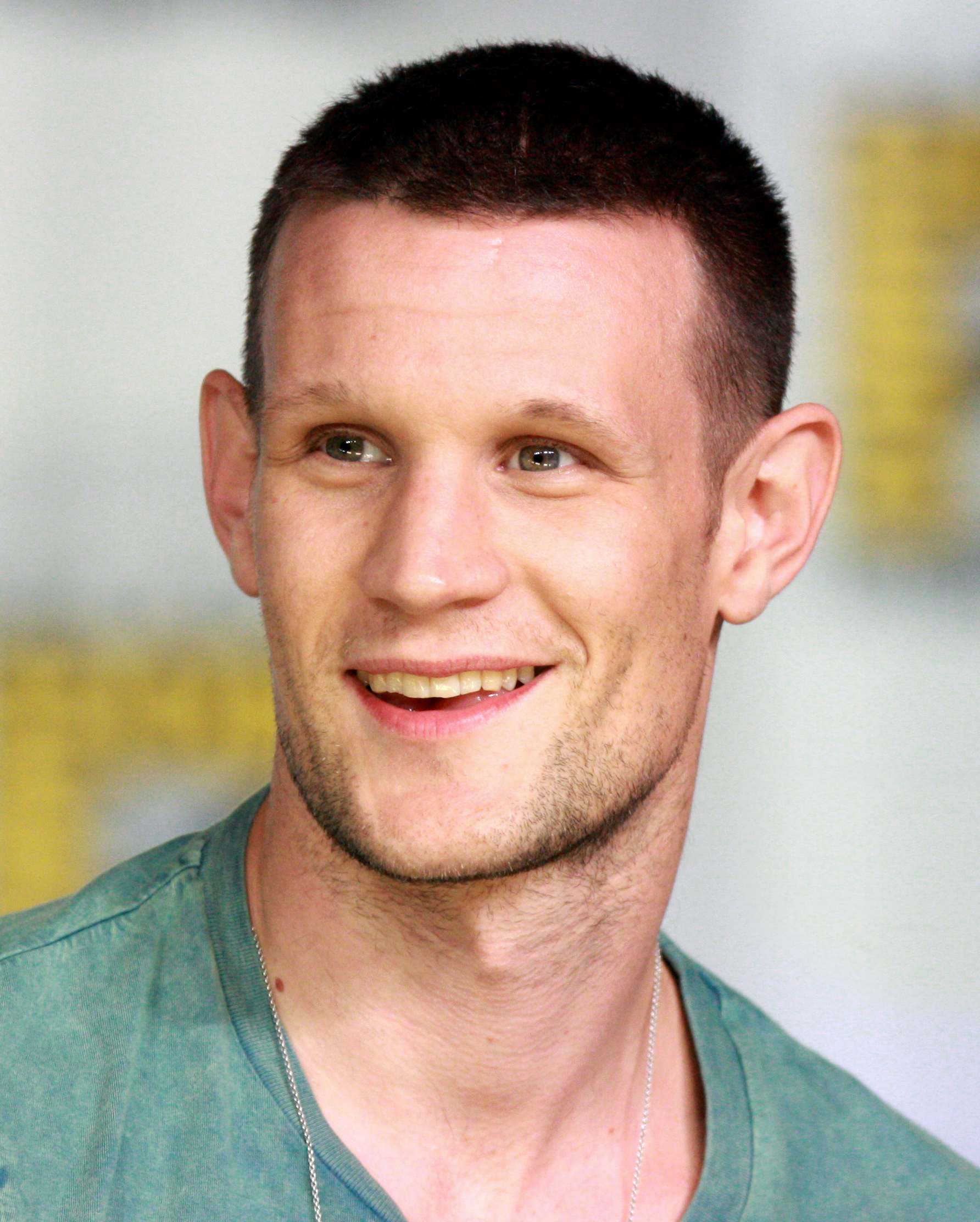
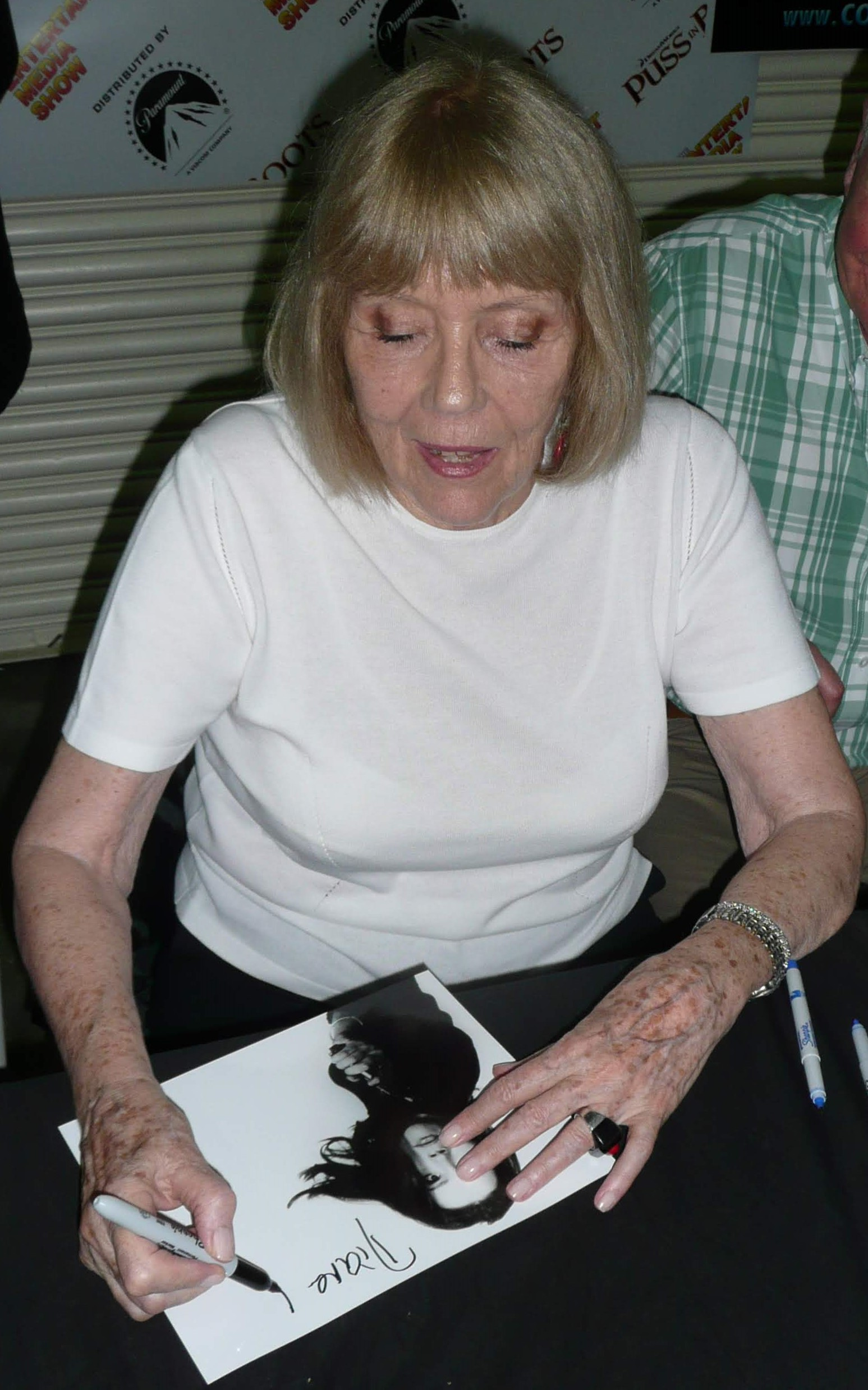
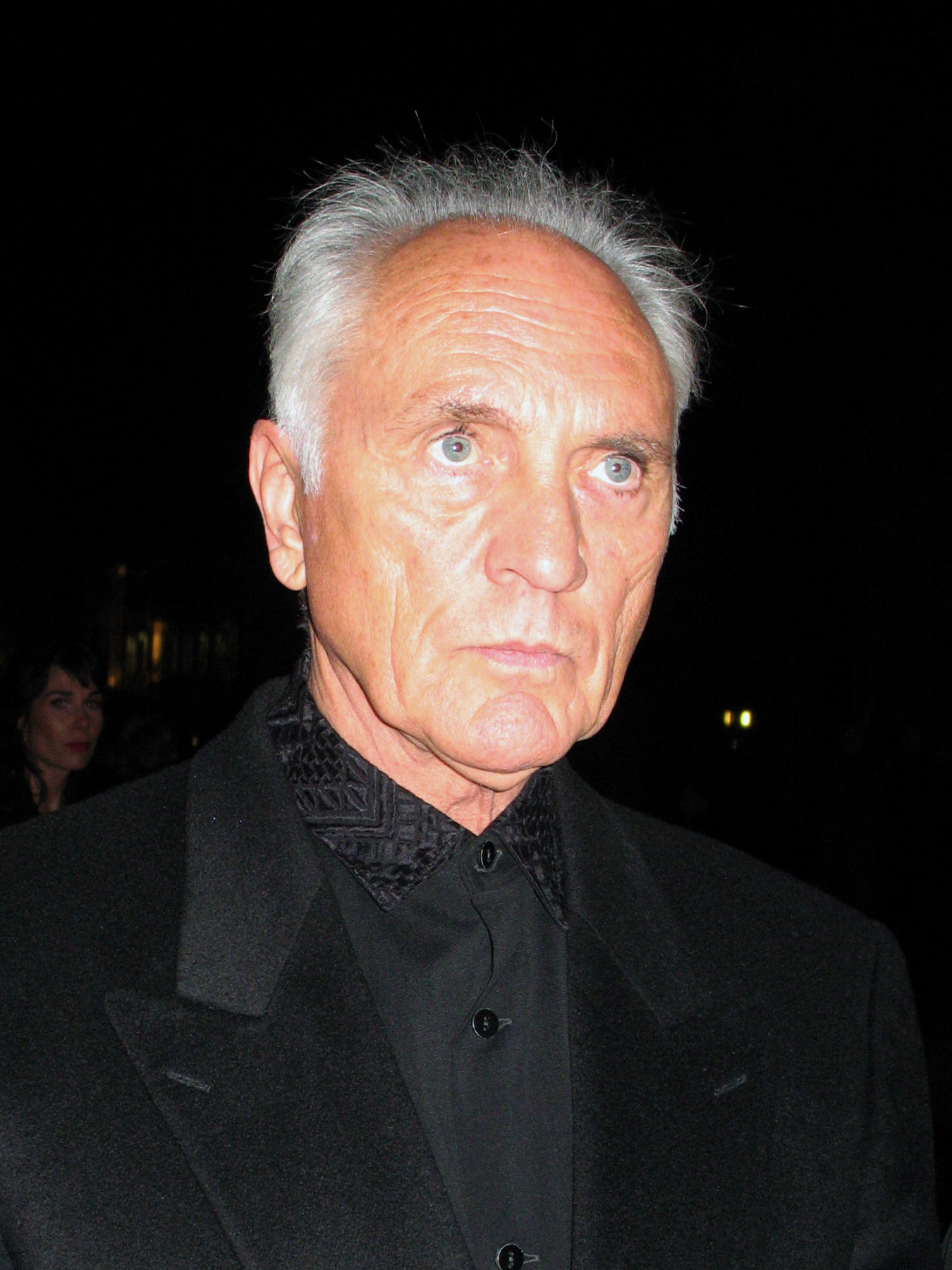
Thomasin McKenzie (left), Anya Taylor-Joy, Matt Smith, Diana Rigg and Terence Stamp respectively play the roles of Ellie, Sandie, Jack, Ms. Collins, and the Silver Haired Gentleman.
- Thomasin McKenzie as Eloise "Ellie", a fashion college student.
- Anya Taylor-Joy as Sandie, an aspiring singer in 1960s London.
- Matt Smith as Jack, the teddy boy manager.
- Rita Tushingham as Peggy, Ellie's maternal grandmother.
- Michael Ajao as John
- Synnøve Karlsen as Jocasta
- Pauline McLynn as Carol
- Terence Stamp as the Silver Haired Gentleman.
- Diana Rigg as Ms Collins, Ellie's landlord.

In addition, Sam Claflin plays younger Lindsey (credited as Punter #5), Beth Singh portrays English 60s hit singer Cilla Black, Margaret Nolan appears as the Sage Barmaid, while twins James and Oliver Phelps cameo as cloakroom attendants. Jessie Mei Li and Kassius Nelson appear as students of the London College of Fashion.

== Production ==
=== Development ===
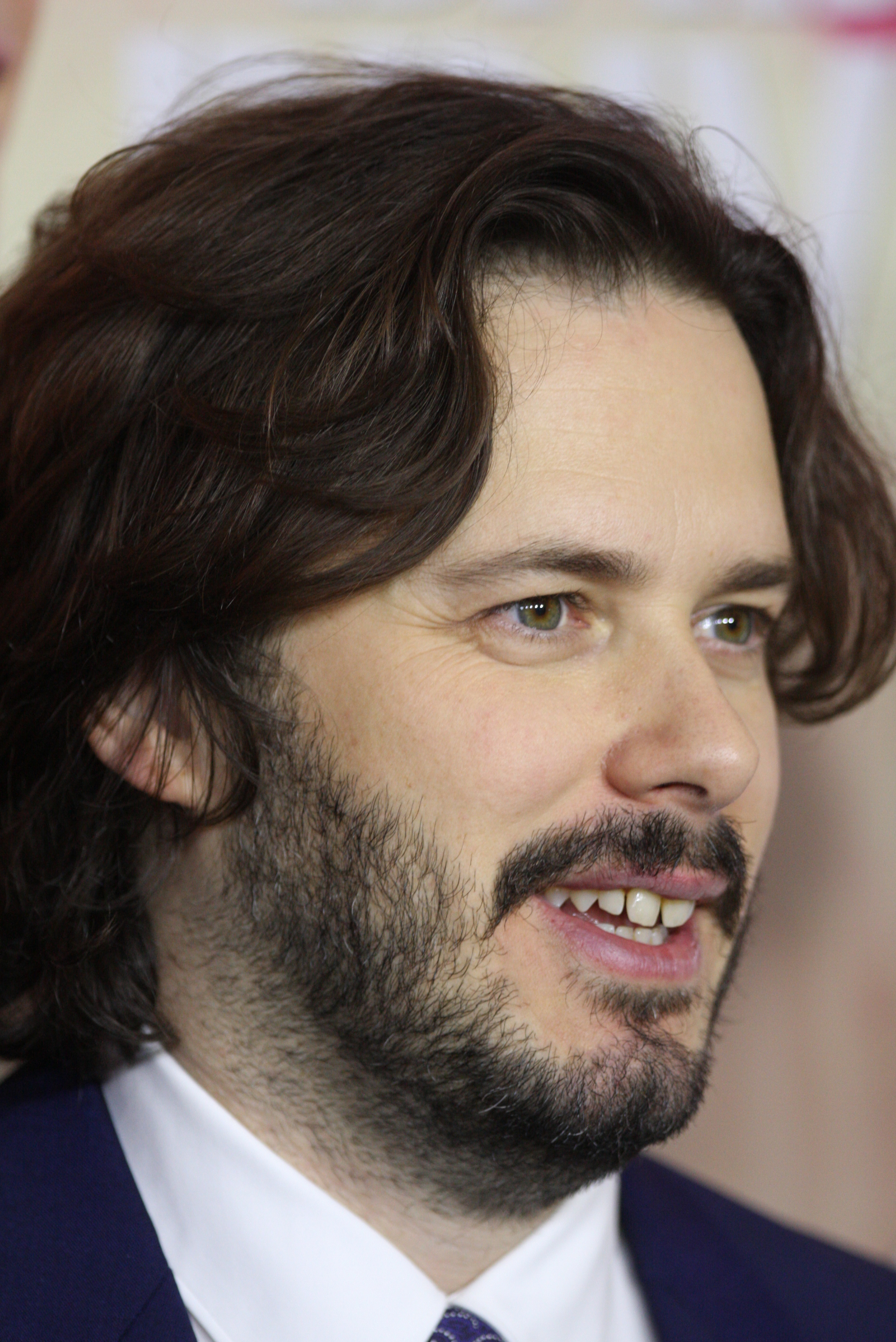
Director, co-producer and co-writer Edgar Wright

Edgar Wright conceived the idea for Last Night in Soho in 2007. He pitched the plot, as a "dark valentine" to London and the Soho neighbourhood, to producers Nira Park and Rachel Prior before the start of filming for The World's End (2013).

Growing up in Somerset, Wright listened to his parents' stories of coming of age in the 1960s, which contributed to his becoming enamoured with the era. He nurtured his obsession through their 1960s record collection, saying he would "sort of almost just disappear into that decade through the music". But he recalled that his mother's memories of Swinging Sixties London were not always fond ones, and that she once said: "I went to Soho once with my friend and we got harassed by a man and chased out. And that's the end of the story."

Wright's obsession with 1960s London helped shape the themes of Last Night in Soho. "Something that I find truly nightmarish—and I guess there's an element where I'm sort of giving a sharp rebuke to myself—is the danger of being overly nostalgic about previous decades. In a way, the film is about romanticizing the past and why it's ... wrong to do that."

British films of the 1960s were also inspirations for Wright, who said: "A lot of films of that period are about the darker side of Soho or of show business. You still have to question where they're coming from, because there's a lot of them, which are more the sensationalistic ones, that take this kind of punitive approach to the female characters. There's a lot of movies where it seems that the genre is 'Girl comes to London to make it big and is roundly punished for her efforts.'"

=== Writing ===
Filmmaker Sam Mendes first introduced Wright to screenwriter Krysty Wilson-Cairns, who later co-wrote 1917 (2019) with Mendes. Wilson-Cairns told Wright in passing that she had worked as a bartender at The Toucan in Soho for five years and lived around the corner, above The Sunset Strip on Dean Street. On the night of the Brexit vote in 2016, they went on a bar crawl through the basement bars of Soho, ending up at one called Trisha's, where Wright pitched her the story of Last Night in Soho.

In December 2017, after the press tour for Baby Driver concluded, Wright felt pressure to begin working on a sequel immediately, but decided instead to go in "a radically different direction" for his next film. He phoned Wilson-Cairns and asked if she wanted to co-write the screenplay for Last Night in Soho. They rented an office in Soho to work on the script, consulting a folder of research collected by Lucy Pardee, a BAFTA Award-winning casting director and researcher who had interviewed people who lived and worked in Soho in the 1960s and the present day. Wright wanted to be "true to the history of the area".

Wright and Wilson-Cairns wrote the first draft of the script in six weeks, before she had to leave to begin 1917 with Mendes. Wright originally wanted the 1960s scenes to have no dialogue or only be accompanied by music, "that they should be like dreams". Wilson-Cairns suggested the character of Sandie have dialogue, saying, "We have to fall in love with Sandie. And I think it's difficult to fall in love with [her] if she doesn't say anything." Wilson-Cairns also proposed a scene where Sandie auditions at a Soho nightclub called the Rialto. As soon as she suggested it, Wright knew that Sandie should sing Petula Clark's song "Downtown".

Last Night in Soho was originally titled Red Light Area, then The Night Has a Thousand Eyes. The final title originates from a 1968 hit single by the English pop band Dave Dee, Dozy, Beaky, Mick & Tich and a conversation Wright had with filmmaker Quentin Tarantino, who was told by Allison Anders that "Last Night in Soho" was the "best title music for a film that's never been made".

=== Casting ===
Wright became aware of Anya Taylor-Joy when he was on the US Dramatic Jury at the 2015 Sundance Film Festival, where The Witch premiered. He met Taylor-Joy in Los Angeles shortly afterward, where he pitched her the story for Last Night in Soho. He initially had Taylor-Joy in mind for the role of Eloise, but later came around to the idea of her playing Sandie, and she agreed after reading a draft of the script. Taylor-Joy's casting was announced in February 2019, and Thomasin McKenzie and Matt Smith were cast shortly thereafter. McKenzie got Wright's attention with what he described as her naturalistic performance in the film Leave No Trace (2018).

Diana Rigg, Terence Stamp, Rita Tushingham, Michael Ajao and Synnøve Karlsen rounded out the rest of the cast in June. Rigg died shortly after production ended. Wright said that he was filming with Rigg "right up until the end", and described working with her as "a beautiful experience". It is also the last film appearance of Margaret Nolan, who died in October 2020.

=== Filming ===
Filming began on 23 May 2019 and was completed on 30 August 2019. Wright posted several photographs on his Instagram account showing that additional filming had commenced on 24 June 2020 and concluded on 5 August 2020. Reshoots took place at Pinewood Studios.

== Music ==
Some of the songs inspired sequences in the film. When Wright heard a cover version of "Wade In The Water" by the Graham Bond Organisation, he "would just start imagining that first dream". Cilla Black's "You're My World" with its dramatic strings conjured up "the sort of the tone and the mood". Most of the songs selected were from the 1960s. Wright also chose "Happy House" by Siouxsie and the Banshees from the 1980s, because "the production on that song is incredible" and it fits a "scene in the movie where they are at a student union Halloween dance". Wright also said: "I like songs that become famous in a different realm. Like the use of "Got My Mind Set on You" the original by James Ray, which most people know as the George Harrison cover. And a lot of people know 'Happy House' because The Weeknd sampled it." Taylor-Joy performed "Downtown" by Petula Clark in the film, saying: "It's not every day you're asked to record several versions of an iconic song. The sounds of the '60s was what first made me fall in love with music so I was overjoyed when Edgar asked me to give it a go". The soundtrack was released on double vinyl.

== Release ==
Last Night in Soho had its world premiere at the 78th Venice International Film Festival on 4 September 2021. It also screened at the Toronto International Film Festival in September 2021 and at the Strasbourg European Fantastic Film Festival on 10 September 2021. Its UK premiere was on 9 October 2021 at the BFI London Film Festival, prior to its general release in the United Kingdom on 29 October 2021. It was originally scheduled to be released on 25 September 2020, but was delayed to 23 April 2021 due to the COVID-19 pandemic, before being delayed again to 22 October, then again to the following weekend.

On 20 October 2021, Universal Pictures released a music video of Anya Taylor-Joy's cover of "Downtown" from the film's soundtrack, featuring scenes from the film.

The film was released on video on demand on 19 November 2021 in the US and Canada. It was released physically on optical media, including Blu-ray, DVD and Ultra HD Blu-ray, on 18 January 2022 by Universal Pictures Home Entertainment.

== Reception ==
=== Box office ===
Last Night in Soho grossed $23 million worldwide.

In the United States and Canada, the film was released alongside Antlers and the expansion of The French Dispatch, and was projected to gross around $5 million from 3,016 cinemas in its opening weekend. It made $1.9 million on its first day and went on to debut to $4.2 million, finishing sixth at the box office. In its second weekend, it dropped 57% to gross $1.8 million, finishing tenth.

=== Critical response ===
On the review aggregator website Rotten Tomatoes, 75% of 350 critics' reviews are positive, with an average rating of 6.9/10. The website's consensus reads: "Although it struggles to maintain its thrilling early momentum, Last Night in Soho shows flashes of Edgar Wright at his most stylish and ambitious." Metacritic, which uses a weighted average, assigned the film a score of 65 out of 100, based on 55 critics, indicating "generally favorable" reviews. Audiences polled by CinemaScore gave the film an average grade of "B+" on an A+ to F scale, while those at PostTrak gave it a 73% positive score, with 56% saying they would definitely recommend it.

Robbie Collin of The Daily Telegraph gave the film a score of 4/5 stars, describing it as "a riotous, rascally hybrid of a thing: part glittering love-letter to the disreputable nightlife district in which it takes place, part darting psychological thriller that rips up the letter as soon as it's written before tearfully torching the scraps". He also praised the cinematography and the "spellbinding recreation of the West End of the '60s".

Reviewing for The Wall Street Journal, Joe Morgenstern also praised the cinematography, writing: "And how gorgeous it is. The cinematographer, Chung-hoon Chung, should have been given star billing too". Xan Brooks of The Guardian gave the film 4/5 stars, describing it as "a gaudy time-travel romp that whisks its modern-day heroine to a bygone London that probably never existed outside our fevered cultural imagination", and called it "thoroughly silly and stupidly enjoyable".

David Rooney of The Hollywood Reporter described the film as "immensely pleasurable" and said that it "delights in playing with genre, morphing from time-travel fantasy to dark fairy tale, from mystery to nightmarish horror". Rooney also praised the film's sets, costume design and McKenzie's performance, describing her as "enchanting".

Linda Marric of The Jewish Chronicle gave the film 4/5 stars, deeming it "a thrilling, gorgeously acted offering from a filmmaker who is at the top of his craft and knows exactly what he wants from his performers". Tom Shone, writing for The Times, criticised the writing, saying there were "one too many jump scares involving a cab screeching to a halt, and two too many scenes of Eloise sitting up in bed and realising it-was-just-a-dream", although he considers that Taylor-Joy's performance "shines".

Writing for Variety, Guy Lodge criticised aspects of the film, observing "Wright's particular affections for B-movies, British Invasion pop and a fast-fading pocket of urban London may be written all over the film, but they aren't compellingly written into it, ultimately swamping the thin supernatural sleuth story at its heart". Lodge praised McKenzie's performance, describing her as "never one to let an underwritten character thwart her best efforts, and whose sweetly open, porous, persistently worry-etched features couldn't be more ideally suited to Eloise's ingenuous, new-in-town outlook". Jake Coyle of the Associated Press also praised McKenzie and Taylor-Joy performance, writing: "While neither of their characters gets enough depth, McKenzie and Taylor-Joy sustain Last Night in Soho, a movie filled with reflections to both past fiction horrors ... and today's #MeToo terrors".

Brad Wheeler of The Globe and Mail gave the film a score of 2.5/4 stars, writing: "Though visually sumptuous and a bunch of fun early on, Edgar Wright's take on sixties and seventies horror eventually devolves into unsatisfying spoof." Richard Lawson of Vanity Fair was more critical of the film, describing it as a "clumsy horror pastiche" and writing, "perhaps the film's thematic intentions are noble. But its execution is glib, never finding the right balance between compassion and leering." Robert Daniels of RogerEbert.com gave the film a score of 1.5/4 stars, writing that it "is funny and chaotic, slick and stylish, and falls apart in its confounding second half".

Rosalind Jana, writing in The Daily Telegraph, also praised the costume design and its importance to the plot, and concluded that "the storytelling becomes overly heavy handed, but the costumes never falter". The film's production design was praised by some critics, including by Yasmin Omar for Harper's Bazaar, who found it "tremendous"; Jaden S. Thompson, writing in The Harvard Crimson thought the design was "sleek, saturated".

Filmmaker George Miller praised the film, saying that it "left me contemplating, among other things, fate, grief, innocence, trauma, insanity, reality, healing, ambition, the sources of creativity, justice and retribution. On top of that, I was exhilarated by Edgar's palpable nostalgia for a time before he was born. To mark this, in addition to the compelling work of Thomasin McKenzie and Anya Taylor-Joy, he includes Rita Tushingham, Terence Stamp and Diana Rigg — who all arrived on the screen so significantly in the '60s."

The film ranks on Rotten Tomatoes' Best Horror Movies of 2021.

=== Accolades ===
Accolades received by House of Gucci
Award	Date of ceremony	Category	Recipient(s)	Result	Ref.
Detroit Film Critics Society	6 December 2021	Best Supporting Actress	Diana Rigg	Nominated	
Detroit Film Critics Society	6 December 2021	Best Use of Music/Sound	Last Night in Soho	Won	
Hollywood Critics Association	28 February 2022	Best Picture	Last Night in Soho	Nominated	
Hollywood Critics Association	28 February 2022	Best Horror Film	Last Night in Soho	Won	
Hollywood Critics Association	28 February 2022	Best Original Screenplay	Edgar Wright and Krysty Wilson-Cairns	Nominated	
Hollywood Critics Association	28 February 2022	Best Score	Steven Price	Nominated	
Hollywood Critics Association	28 February 2022	Best Production Design	Marcus Rowland	Nominated	
Hollywood Critics Association	28 February 2022	Best Editing	Paul Machliss	Won	
Hollywood Critics Association	28 February 2022	Best Costume Design	Odile Dicks-Mireaux	Nominated	
Visual Effects Society	8 March 2022	Outstanding Supporting Visual Effects in a Photoreal Feature	Tom Proctor, Gavin Gregory, Julian Gnass, Fabricio Baessa	Won	
British Academy Film Awards	13 March 2022	Outstanding British Film	Edgar Wright, Tim Bevan, Eric Fellner, Nira Park and Krysty Wilson-Cairns	Nominated	
British Academy Film Awards	13 March 2022	Best Sound	Tim Cavagin, Dan Morgan, Colin Nicolson and Julian Slater	Nominated	
Critics' Choice Super Awards	17 March 2022	Best Horror Movie	Last Night in Soho	Nominated	
Critics' Choice Super Awards	17 March 2022	Best Actress in a Horror Movie	Thomasin McKenzie	Nominated	
Critics' Choice Super Awards	17 March 2022	Best Actress in a Horror Movie	Anya Taylor-Joy	Nominated	
British Fantasy Award	17 September 2022	Best Film/Television Production	Last Night in Soho	Won	
Saturn Awards	25 October 2022	Best Horror Film	Last Night in Soho	Nominated	
Saturn Awards	25 October 2022	Best Supporting Actress	Diana Rigg	Nominated	
Saturn Awards	25 October 2022	Best Production Design	Marcus Rowland	Nominated	
