= Harry Potter 20th Anniversary: Return to Hogwarts =

2022 television special

- Promotional poster
- Based on: Harry Potter by Warner Bros. Pictures
- Directed by: Casey Patterson; Joe Pearlman; Giorgio Testi; Eran Creevy
- Starring: Daniel Radcliffe; Rupert Grint; Emma Watson; Helena Bonham Carter; Robbie Coltrane; Ralph Fiennes; Jason Isaacs; Gary Oldman; Tom Felton; James Phelps; Oliver Phelps; Mark Williams; Bonnie Wright; Alfred Enoch; Ian Hart; Toby Jones; Matthew Lewis; Evanna Lynch; David Heyman; Chris Columbus; Alfonso Cuarón; Mike Newell; David Yates
- Narrated by: Stephen Fry
- Music by: Charlie Mole
- Countries of origin: United Kingdom; United States
- Original language: English

Production
- Executive producers: Casey Patterson; Carol Donova; Ashley Edens; Marisa Clifford; Louis Mole; Sam Bridger; Isabel Davis; David Heyman
- Producers: Lottie Allen; Alice Cady; Rosa Junkovic; Maryam Lamond
- Production location: Warner Bros. Studio Tour London – The Making of Harry Potter
- Cinematography: Simon Fanthorpe; Sebastian Feehan; Geoffrey Sentamu
- Editors: Simon Bryant; Jim Clark; James Collett; Bill DeRonde; Asaf Eisenberg; Will Gilby; Lior Linevitz; Pablo Noe; Tim Perniciaro; Jacob Proctor
- Running time: 103 minutes
- Production companies: Casey Patterson Ent.; Pulse Films; Warner Bros. Unscripted Television

Original release
- Network: HBO Max
- Release: 1 January 2022

Harry Potter 20th Anniversary: Return to Hogwarts is a television special released on 1 January 2022 on HBO Max. It is a reunion special for the cast and crew of the Harry Potter film series, marking the twentieth anniversary of the series' first instalment, The Philosopher's Stone. It was produced by Warner Bros. Unscripted Television in association with Warner Horizon and executive produced by Casey Patterson.

The films' protagonist trio Daniel Radcliffe, Rupert Grint, and Emma Watson appear throughout the special, along with surviving principal cast members Helena Bonham Carter, Robbie Coltrane, Ralph Fiennes, Jason Isaacs, Gary Oldman, Tom Felton, James Phelps, Oliver Phelps, Mark Williams, Bonnie Wright, Alfred Enoch, Ian Hart, Toby Jones, Matthew Lewis, and Evanna Lynch, producer David Heyman, and filmmakers Chris Columbus, Alfonso Cuarón, Mike Newell, and David Yates. The special was Coltrane's final on-screen appearance prior to his death on 14 October 2022.

== Cast ==
- Daniel Radcliffe
- Rupert Grint
- Emma Watson
- Helena Bonham Carter
- Robbie Coltrane
- Alfred Enoch
- Tom Felton
- Ralph Fiennes
- Ian Hart
- Jason Isaacs
- Toby Jones
- Matthew Lewis
- Evanna Lynch
- Gary Oldman
- James Phelps
- Oliver Phelps
- Mark Williams
- Bonnie Wright
- David Heyman
- Chris Columbus
- Alfonso Cuarón
- Mike Newell
- David Yates
- J. K. Rowling (archival footage)
- Stephen Fry (chapter passage narration)

The reunion features clips of and pays tribute to cast members who have since died, including Helen McCrory, Alan Rickman, John Hurt, Richard Griffiths, and Richard Harris.

== Production ==
=== Development ===
In November 2021, Warner Bros. announced Harry Potter 20th Anniversary: Return to Hogwarts, a retrospective special featuring the cast and filmmakers of the Harry Potter film series to celebrate the 20th anniversary of the release of the series' first instalment, Harry Potter and the Philosopher's Stone (2001). The special is produced by Warner Bros. Unscripted Television in association with Warner Horizon and executive produced by Casey Patterson.

==== Absence of J. K. Rowling ====
J. K. Rowling—the author of the original Harry Potter book series, who had a significant role in the production of the film adaptations—is largely absent from the special. She appears for under thirty seconds in archival footage from her interviews in 2019 and is mentioned by some of the special's interviewees, but no advertisements for the special featured images of her. Critics speculated that this was due to her views on transgender issues and, as The Daily Telegraph's Ed Power put it, consequent "public rebuke by the series' stars". However, Entertainment Weekly reported that Rowling had been invited to appear but she felt that the archival footage was sufficient, with "sources close to the situation" denying that the author's decision was related to the controversy around her remarks on transgender issues.

=== Filming ===
The special was filmed at Warner Bros. Studio Tour London – The Making of Harry Potter in Leavesden, England.

=== Corrections ===
In the initial release, a childhood image of Emma Roberts was mistakenly presented as an image of a young Watson, and Oliver and James Phelps are mislabelled as each other. By 3 January, these errors had been corrected in a new version.

=== Music ===
Charlie Mole composed the music for the special. In addition, John Williams, who scored the first three Harry Potter films, re-recorded two of his compositions ("Hedwig's Theme" and "Harry's Wondrous World") for the special with the orchestra of Vienna Synchron Stage, conducted by James Seymour Brett.

== Release ==
Return to Hogwarts was released on HBO Max on 1 January 2022. The special aired on 10 April 2022 on TBS, and on Cartoon Network ahead of the release of Fantastic Beasts: The Secrets of Dumbledore. It was later released on both Blu-ray and DVD on 9 August 2022.

List of international distributors
Region	Broadcaster(s)	Ref(s)
Asia (selected countries)	HBO Go	
Australia	Binge	
Belgium	Streamz (Flanders in Dutch); Tipik and Auvio (Wallonia in French)	
Canada	Crave (in English and French)	
Central and Eastern Europe (selected countries)	HBO Go	
France	Salto	
Germany	Sky	
India	Prime Video	
Vietnam	FPT Telecom	
Ireland	Sky and Now	
Israel	Yes	
Italy	Sky	
Latin America and Caribbean	HBO Max	
New Zealand	TVNZ 2 and TVNZ OnDemand	
Nordic countries	HBO Max	
Russia	Amediateka	
Spain	HBO Max	
Switzerland	Sky (in German); RTS 1 (in French)	
Portugal	HBO Portugal	
United Kingdom	Sky and Now	
United States	HBO Max	

== Reception ==
=== Critical response ===
On the review-aggregation website Rotten Tomatoes, the special has a 93% approval rating with an average rating of 7.5/10, based on 27 reviews. The site's critical consensus reads, "Affectionate and revealing, Return to Hogwarts offers an intimate glimpse into how the making of the Harry Potter franchise delivered its own special kind of magic for those involved." Metacritic, which uses a weighted average, assigned a score of 65 out of 100 based on 11 critics, indicating "generally favorable reviews".

=== Accolades ===
Year	Award	Category	Nominee(s)	Result	Ref.
2022	Hollywood Critics Association TV Awards	Best Streaming Variety Sketch Series, Talk Series, or Special	Harry Potter 20th Anniversary: Return to Hogwarts	Nominated	
2022	Primetime Emmy Awards	Outstanding Variety Special (Pre-Recorded)	Casey Patterson, Carol Donova, Ashley Edens, Marisa Clifford, Louis Mole, Sam Bridger, Isabel Davis, David Heyman, Rob Paine, Chase Simonds, Mike Darnell, Brooke Karzen, and Dan Sacks	Nominated	
2022	Primetime Emmy Awards	Outstanding Picture Editing for Variety Programming	Simon Bryant, Jim Clark, James Collett, Bill DeRonde, Asaf Eisenberg, Will Gilby, Lior Linevitz–Matthews, Pablo Noe, Tim Perniciaro, and Jacob Proctor	Nominated	
