= National Performing Arts School =

Coordinates: 53.3412°N 6.2370°W

The National Performing Arts School (NPAS) is located in Dublin, Ireland. Formed in 1993, its courses are aimed at students aged from 2 to 22 years old and include classes in drama, singing and dancing. Every two years, an NPAS show is staged at the Olympia Theatre. The arts school is run by Jill Doyle and Eamon Farrell (brother of Colin Farrell).

== Location ==
NPAS is located in 'The Factory', a rehearsal, recording and performance space. Performers that have rehearsed at 'The Factory' include U2, Britney Spears, Pink, The Abbey Theatre and Riverdance. As of 2025, NPAS had its "creative home" at 'The Factory' at Boland's Mills.

== Notable alumni ==
Performers to have attended the school include actors Colin Farrell, Eve Hewson, Jack Reynor and Devon Murray, B*Witched members Edele Lynch and Keavy Lynch were also graduates of the NPAS.
