= Fred and George Weasley =

Characters from Harry Potter

- Harry Potter characters
- James and Oliver Phelps as Fred and George Weasley (Note: Promotional image for Harry Potter and the Order of the Phoenix (2007))
- First appearance: Harry Potter and the Philosopher's Stone (1997)
- Created by: J. K. Rowling
- Portrayed by: James Phelps (Fred) (Note: Film series); Oliver Phelps (George); Tristan Harland (Fred) (Note: Television series); Gabriel Harland (George)

In-universe information
- Family: Arthur Weasley (father); Molly Weasley (mother); Bill Weasley (brother); Charlie Weasley (brother); Percy Weasley (brother); Ron Weasley (brother); Ginny Weasley (sister)
- Spouses: Angelina Johnson; (George's wife)
- Children: Fred Weasley II; (George's son); Roxanne Weasley; (George's daughter)
- Nationality: British
- House: Gryffindor
- Born: 1 April 1978
- Died: 2 May 1998 (aged 20) (Fred)

Fred and George Weasley are fictional characters in the Harry Potter series of novels by J. K. Rowling. They are identical twin brothers of the Weasley family, which also includes Ron Weasley and Ginny Weasley. Fred and George are friends of Harry Potter, members of the Order of the Phoenix, and founders of the joke shop Weasleys' Wizard Wheezes. They are portrayed by the identical twins James and Oliver Phelps in the Harry Potter films.

== Character biography ==
Fred and George are identical twin sons of Arthur and Molly Weasley, the younger brothers of Bill, Charlie, and Percy, and the older brothers of Ron and Ginny, who are both members of Harry Potter's close group of friends. The twins revel in practical jokes and pranks, often acting as comic relief.

While their best friend is Lee Jordan – their classmate, dormmate, and fellow prankster – the twins are also good friends with Harry, having played Quidditch with him for Gryffindor. They are less friendly with Percy, whom they love to torment for being a model student. Like the other Weasleys, they have flaming red hair and are described as being on the shorter, stockier side like their second older brother Charlie.

== Appearances ==
=== Novels ===
Fred and George are introduced in Harry Potter and the Philosopher's Stone (1997) when they meet Harry Potter at King's Cross station. They are two years ahead of Harry, Ron, and Hermione Granger. They are the school clowns and troublemakers, more interested in inventing new pranks than studying. Despite their unimpressive academic record, they show a high degree of knowledge and skill in creating magical jokes and tricks. Both play as Beaters on the Gryffindor Quidditch team and are very talented players.

Fred and George care little for Prefects or rules, which contributes in their eventual falling out with their older brother Percy. Their appearances and personalities are so indistinguishable that they can fool even their mother. Fred appears slightly more aggressive/take-charge than George, which is most apparent in Harry Potter and the Goblet of Fire where George is more cautious about blackmailing Ludo Bagman and, unlike Fred, is not mentioned as having a date at the Yule Ball.

In Harry Potter and the Goblet of Fire, Fred and George begin selling their own jokes by owl order, under the name "Weasleys' Wizard Wheezes."

One of their primary ambitions is to run their own joke shop. Harry makes this possible by giving them his winnings from the Triwizard Tournament. In return, in Harry Potter and the Half-Blood Prince, they allow Harry to take anything from their joke shop for free while asking Ron to pay for the items in his arms.

The pair provide Harry with useful assistance throughout the series; in Harry Potter and the Chamber of Secrets they and Ron help him escape his house arrest at Privet Drive. In Harry Potter and the Prisoner of Azkaban they give him the Marauder's Map. In Goblet of Fire, they try to encourage Harry and Ron to find dates to the Yule Ball by letting them see Fred ask Angelina Johnson. They also help Harry in Order of the Phoenix when Harry wishes to talk with his godfather, Sirius Black, by creating a distraction, leaving Hogwarts in a state of chaos. They were also members of Dumbledore's Army, a group started by Harry, Ron, and Hermione to teach practical instruction in Defence Against the Dark Arts, which Umbridge had removed from that course's curriculum.

Later that year, they are banned from Quidditch and decide to abandon formal education; before leaving, though, they pay tribute to Dumbledore by waging a prank war against the dictatorial Dolores Umbridge.

It is stated by several characters, including Professor Flitwick and Hermione, that despite their poor grades, the Weasley twins are extremely proficient wizards, capable of sophisticated magic. This is evidenced by the large number of inventions they have created and by Fred's ability to transform Ron's teddy bear into a spider even before he was old enough to attend Hogwarts.

=== After Hogwarts ===
As they leave, the twins inform their fellow students of their new shop in Diagon Alley and offer discounts to students who will likewise harass Umbridge. The swamp, meanwhile, remains for some time, since Umbridge is unable to remove it and no other teacher particularly wishes to. After Professor Umbridge is driven from the school, Professor Flitwick removes it, but leaves a small bit as a tribute to the Weasley twins.

In The Half-Blood Prince, Fred and George continue to run their very successful joke shop, Weasleys' Wizard Wheezes, out of Diagon Alley. Though Mrs. Weasley initially disapproves of their enterprises, she realises they have a natural gift and passion for their business and has since raised no objections. In fact, she is now rather impressed with how successful the twins have become since leaving school.

=== Deathly Hallows ===
In Harry Potter and the Deathly Hallows, Fred and George are members of the Order of the Phoenix and serve as two of Harry's six decoys when he escapes Privet Drive. George loses one of his ears to Snape's Sectumsempra curse (which was aimed at a Death Eater's wand hand, but missed).

During this novel, every member of the Weasley family is being watched by the Ministry of Magic (now led by Death Eaters). It is impossible for Fred and George to return to their shop in Diagon Alley to sell their products, so they begin to run another owl-order business out of their Auntie Muriel's house.

During the Battle of Hogwarts, Fred is killed in an explosion. Before his death, Fred reconciles with his estranged brother Percy, who arrives at Hogwarts to participate in the fight and apologises to the family for not believing them. Percy, who was right next to him, was distraught, and refused to leave Fred's body. Fred died with a smile frozen on his face, as moments before death he was laughing at Percy for making a rare joke.

There are only two mentions of George after this. The first comes when Harry sees that the dead have been laid out in a row in the Great Hall. He can't see Fred's body, because he is surrounded by his family. George is only briefly described as kneeling at his twin's head. The second mention is when George and Lee Jordan defeat the Death Eater Yaxley.

According to Rowling, she always knew, intuitively, that Fred would die, but she does not know why. Although not mentioned in the novel, Rowling said in a web chat that George never does fully get over Fred's death. However, he goes on with his life, turning Weasleys' Wizarding Wheezes into a "money spinner" with Ron. George later names his first child with Angelina Johnson after his twin.

== Personality ==
Throughout the series, the twins are portrayed as troublemakers. However, as the twins explain to Hermione in Harry Potter and the Order of the Phoenix, they do avoid getting in serious trouble, pointing out that, despite all their rule-breaking, they have never been kicked out of school. "We've always known where to draw the line," says Fred. "We might have put a toe across it occasionally," adds George. When Dumbledore is forced out of Hogwarts, they decide to cause real mayhem for the new headmistress, the hated Dolores Umbridge, something that they had always stopped short of before, for example by creating swamps in the corridors and setting off fireworks that multiply. Before they can be punished, they summon their brooms and depart the school for good, an act that would later come to be known as "pulling a Weasley", often said by unhappy students who were ready to leave school as well.

The twins display a genuine loyalty to Harry, Ron, and Hermione, generosity to strangers, and a protective nature. George was the first Weasley to befriend Harry (not yet realizing he was the famous Harry Potter). In Chamber of Secrets, Malfoy calls Hermione a "Mudblood" and the twins get worked up at this vulgarity; they jump to her defense. When Harry is unable to go on Hogsmeade trips in Prisoner of Azkaban, they give him the Marauder's Map and show him a secret passage out of the castle so he can participate in the trips with his friends. In Half-Blood Prince, the twins show up in Hogsmeade to surprise Ron on his seventeenth birthday. After Ron had been accidentally poisoned that morning, the twins show genuine concern and worry for him. They deliver his birthday gifts at his bedside as he sits in the hospital wing recovering.

Rowling stated that George "was the quieter of the two", while she described Fred as "the ringleader, crueler and funnier twin."

== Portrayal in film ==
In the Harry Potter film adaptations, Fred and George are played by twins James and Oliver Phelps, respectively. Unlike the characters in the novels, the Phelpses are tall and lanky. The actors are not natural redheads and had their hair dyed for the films.

During the filming of Harry Potter and the Deathly Hallows – Part 2, the scene where George mourns the death of Fred was only able to be shot twice, as the filming was emotionally draining for George's portrayer Oliver to imagine that his own brother had passed. Fred's portrayer James however, found the scene to be "the easiest day of work" and fell asleep during shooting of the scene, missing his lunch break.

== Reception ==
The entertainment website IGN has referred to Fred and George as "the kind of older brothers that we all would have wanted to grow up with." In an article about Fred's death, Mashable called him a fan-favourite character. The death of Fred in Harry Potter and the Deathly Hallows was the first death author J.K. Rowling apologised for, stating that his death was the worst for her personally. Ever since apologising for the death of the character, Rowling has made an annual tradition of apologising to the fans of the series for the deaths of their favourite characters on the fictitious anniversary of the Battle of Hogwarts. To date, Rowling has apologised for the deaths of Remus Lupin, Severus Snape, Dobby the House Elf and Sirius Black, along with Fred's.
