= Devon Murray =

Irish actor (born 1988)

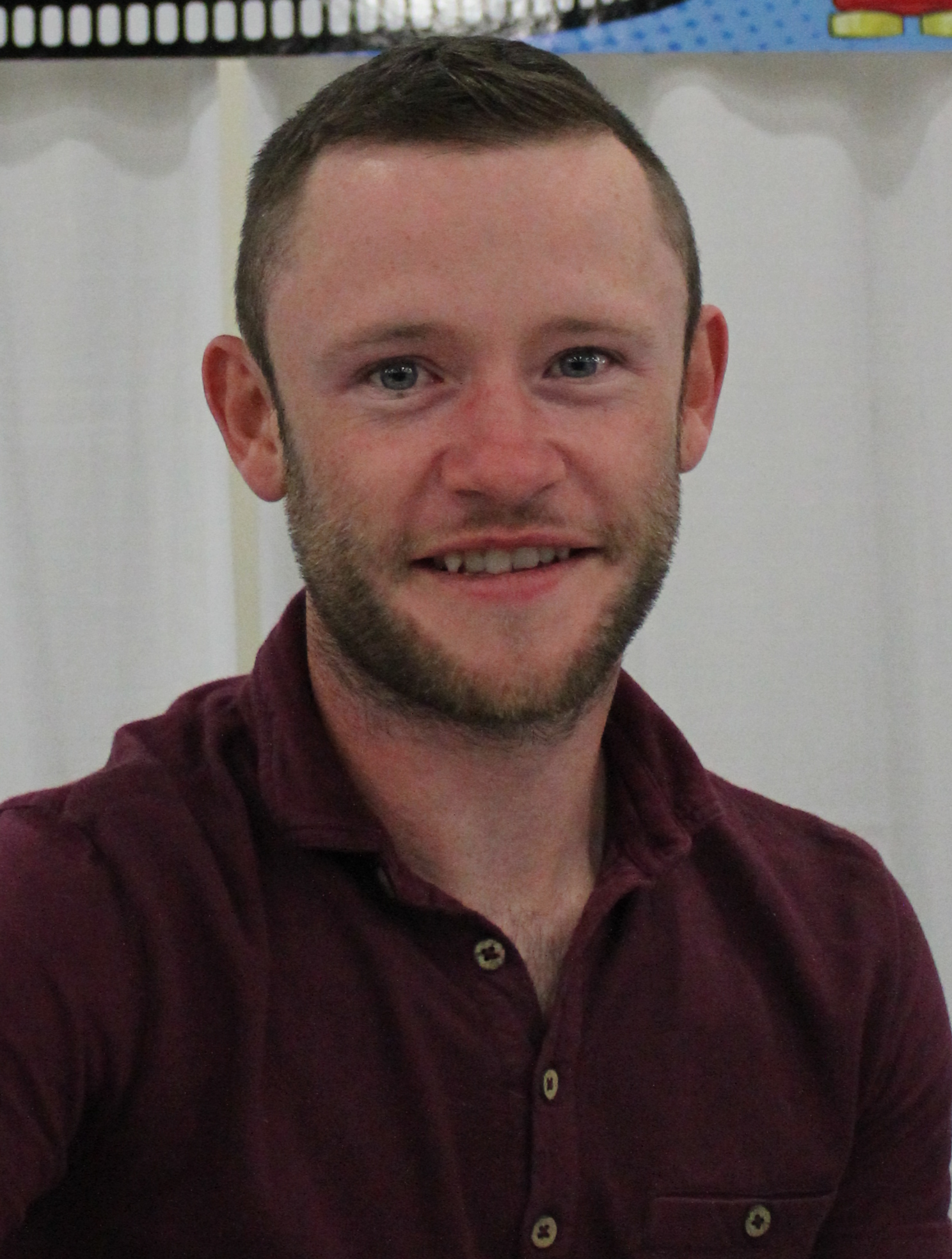
- Murray in 2016
- Born: Devon Michael Murray; 28 October 1988 (age 37); Celbridge, County Kildare, Ireland
- Occupation: Actor
- Years active: 1997–2018
- Height: 5 ft 2.5 in (159 cm)
- Partner: Shannon McCaffrey Quinn (2018–)
- Children: 1

Devon Michael Murray (born 28 October 1988) is an Irish actor, best known for playing Seamus Finnigan in the Harry Potter film series.

== Early life ==
Devon Michael Murray was born on 28 October 1988 in County Kildare, Ireland, to Fidelma and Michael Murray.

== Career ==
When he was seven, his parents sent him to the Billie Barry Stage School and within five weeks he landed a Tesco television ad. Within two months he was in his first film, acting alongside Aidan Quinn in This Is My Father (1998). He then joined the National Performing Arts School and had his breakthrough role in Angela's Ashes (1999). He also acted alongside Jane Seymour in Yesterday's Children (2000).

Murray auditioned four times before landing the role of Seamus Finnigan in the Harry Potter film series. He played the character in all eight movies, the production of which spanned from 2000 to 2010.

Unlike other cast members, Murray was absent from the Harry Potter 20th Anniversary: Return to Hogwarts reunion, which released in 2022.

== Personal life ==
Murray has been in a relationship with Shannon McCaffrey Quinn since late 2020. The engaged couple have a son, born in 2021.

Murray struggled with depression for 10 years.

== Filmography ==
Year	Title	Role	Notes
1998	This Is My Father	Christy	
1999	Angela's Ashes	Middle Malachy	
2000	Yesterday's Children	Young Geoffrey Sutton	TV film
2001	Harry Potter and the Philosopher's Stone	Seamus Finnigan	Released as Harry Potter and the Sorcerer's Stone in the US.
2002	Harry Potter and the Chamber of Secrets	Seamus Finnigan	
2002	Kelly	Himself	TV series
2003	Interviews with Students	Himself	Video documentary short
2004	Head to Shrunken Head	Himself	Video documentary short
2004	Harry Potter and the Prisoner of Azkaban	Seamus Finnigan	
2005	Harry Potter and the Goblet of Fire	Seamus Finnigan	
2006	Reflections on the Fourth Film	Himself	Video documentary short
2007	Harry Potter and the Order of the Phoenix	Seamus Finnigan	
2008	Gone Fishing	Young Bill	Short film
2008	The Podge and Rodge Show	Himself	TV series episode #4.8
2008	The 9th Meteor Ireland Music Awards	Himself	Presenter
2009	Harry Potter and the Half-Blood Prince	Seamus Finnigan	
2010	Harry Potter and the Deathly Hallows – Part 1	Seamus Finnigan	
2011	Harry Potter and the Deathly Hallows – Part 2	Seamus Finnigan	
2017	Every time you need me	Simonna	Music video
2018	Damo & Ivor: The Movie	Bosco	
2025	Harry Potter: Wizards of Baking	Himself	Season 2, episodes 2 and 6
