= Dave Heeley =

English marathoner

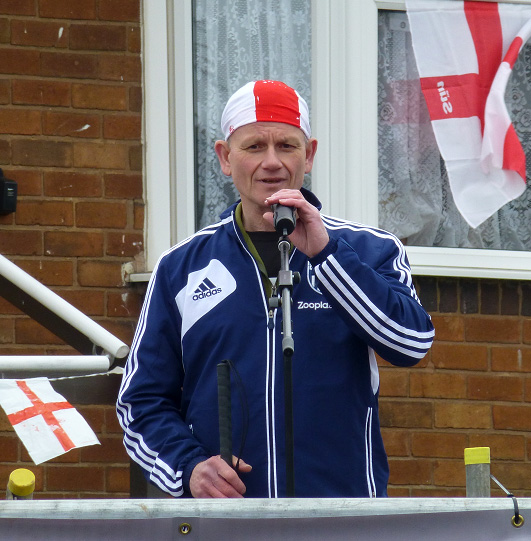
Dave Heeley opening the Stone Cross St George's Parade 2014

Dave George Heeley OBE, a father-of-three from West Bromwich, who is nicknamed Blind Dave, is the first blind person to complete the seven-marathon challenge, doing so in 2008.

The first marathon was in the Falkland Islands, via Rio de Janeiro, Los Angeles, Sydney, Dubai, Tunis and culminating at the Flora London Marathon. Heeley was aged 50 at the time of his achievement.

Heeley, from West Bromwich, has run 10 marathons in 10 days travelling from John O'Groats to Land's End, and cycled between each stage. Prior to the 2012 Olympics in London, Heeley carried the Olympic Torch on a 300-metre stretch of the relay in Cobridge, Stoke-on-Trent, on 31 May 2012, before taking part in the opening ceremony of the Paralympics on 29 August 2012.

In 2012, National Express West Midlands named a bus Dave Heeley in Heeley's honour. He has since taken part in 7inSeven, a 700-mile week-long bike ride between Zurich and Birmingham in aid of Help Harry Help Others.

In late 2016, UK film production company, Pixel Revolution Films announced that they were producing a film titled "7 Days" based on the life of Dave Heeley and his experiences completing the 2008 seven-marathon challenge. The film was released in 2019 and was directed by Ian and Dominic Higgins and produced by Nigel Martin Davey.
