= King of the Nerds (British TV series) =

British reality TV series

- Genre: Reality competition
- Directed by: Ashley Meneely
- Presented by: Konnie Huq
- Country of origin: United Kingdom
- Original language: English
- No. of series: 1
- No. of episodes: 8

Production
- Executive producers: Adam Adler; Shannon Delwiche; Andrew Newman
- Producer: Ross Curran
- Running time: 40 to 43 minutes
- Production companies: Electus; Objective Productions

Original release
- Network: Sky 1
- Release: 12 July – 30 August 2015

King of the Nerds is a British reality competition series co-produced by Electus and Objective Productions. Based on the American series of the same name, the show features nerds and geeks competing in challenges for a £15,000 prize and the title of "King of the Nerds". It is hosted by television presenter and writer Konnie Huq. The series premiered on Sky 1 on 12 July 2015.

== Premise ==
Following roughly the same format as the American series, King of the Nerds follows several contestants as they compete in various challenges testing their intellect, ingenuity, skills, and pop-culture prowess. The competitors live together in one house, named "Nerdvana", initially competing as teams before proceeding to individual challenges. In each episode, the contestants compete in a challenge called the "Nerd War". The winner(s) of the Nerd War are granted immunity from elimination. Two losing players are then selected to compete in a head-to-head elimination challenge called the "Nerd-Off"; one player is selected by vote between the losers of the Nerd War, while the other is selected by the winner(s).

Unlike its US counterpart, which features different challenges for each Nerd-Off, the UK version uses a single, quiz bowl-style challenge. The Nerd-Off consists of two rounds. In the wild-card round, the two nerds compete simultaneously to answer questions about a mystery topic. In the Quick Fire round, the contestants, taking turns, are given 90 seconds to answer as many questions as possible on a subject chosen by their opponent. The person with the fewest points by the end of both rounds is eliminated from the competition. In the event of a tie, the contestants are given one final "killer question". One contestant is eliminated in each episode until the finale, where the last remaining competitor is crowned the "King of the Nerds", claims the Throne of Games (a reference to the television series Game of Thrones), and wins the show's £15,000 prize.

== Development and production ==
Sky 1 announced that it had ordered an adaptation of King of the Nerds for the United Kingdom on 31 July 2014. The UK version, which received an order for eight episodes, was co-produced by Objective Productions and Electus and filmed at Felsted School in Felsted, England. Electus International distributed the UK series, alongside the format and the US series. The first series was originally scheduled to air in October 2014; however, the premiere was delayed to 2015 due to unspecified reasons.

== Contestants ==
Name	Age	Specialty
Curtis Reubens	19	Maths nerd
Emily Jones	24	Star Wars nerd
Hannah Harle	21	Role-play nerd
Karen Dawson	31	Doctor nerd
Kenny Lam	23	Cosplay nerd
Kerry Allingham	21	Gamer nerd
Mark Hughes	28	Trekkie nerd
Matt Barr	30	Trivia nerd
Robyn Potter	—N/a	Potter nerd
Ryan MacDonald	21	Space nerd
Yasmeen Ojeleye	21	Manga nerd

== Contestant progress ==
Contestant	Episode								
Contestant	1	2	3	4	5	6	7^{2}	8	
Matt	IN	WIN	WIN	RISK	WIN	IN	RISK	WIN	WINNER
Mark	WIN	IN	RISK	WIN	IN	WIN	IN	WIN	RUNNER-UP
Kenny	IN	WIN	WIN	IN	WIN	RISK	WIN	OUT^{3}	
Emily	WIN	RISK	IN	WIN	RISK	WIN	IN	OUT^{3}	
Curtis	IN	WIN	WIN	IN	WIN	WIN^{1}	OUT		
Kerry	IN	WIN	WIN	IN	WIN	OUT			
Yasmeen	WIN	IN	IN	WIN	OUT				
Karen	RISK	WIN	WIN	OUT					
Hannah	WIN	IN	OUT						
Ryan	WIN	OUT							
Robyn	OUT								

^Note 1: Curtis switched from Team Defenders of Time to Team E.V.I.L.
^Note 2: Teams were dissolved and Nerd Wars became individual challenges.
^Note 3: The losers of the final Nerd War were automatically eliminated.

Key
(WINNER) The contestant won the competition and was crowned "King of the Nerds".
(RUNNER-UP) The contestant was the runner-up in the competition.
(WIN) The contestant won the Nerd War and received immunity from elimination.
(IN) The contestant lost the Nerd War, but was not selected to compete in the Nerd-Off.
(RISK) The contestant won the Nerd-Off and escaped elimination.
(OUT) The contestant lost the Nerd-Off and was eliminated from the competition.
Teams
The contestant was a member of Team Defenders of Time.
The contestant was a member of Team E.V.I.L. (Extremely Valiant Independence League).

== Episodes ==
No.	Title	Original release date
1	"Episode 1"	12 July 2015
Nerd War: Two players are randomly selected as captains to initiate a schoolyard pick to separate the remaining players into teams, with one player left over. Since "nothing is nerdier than getting picked last", the unselected contestant is declared the winner of the challenge. This contestant joins the team of their choice, winning the challenge for them, and sends another contestant to join the losing team.; Nerd-Off: Karen vs. Robyn; Wild Card Round: Acronyms; Quick Fire Round: Music theory (Karen); capital cities (Robyn)
2	"Episode 2"	19 July 2015
Nerd War: The teams compete in a cosplay contest, requiring them to develop a coherent mythology and appearance for their given theme (heroes or villains). The contestants are judged by make-up and prosthetic artist Charlie Hounslow, TV costume designer Howard Burden, and professional prop and costume creator Tabitha Lyons.; Nerd-Off: Emily vs. Ryan; Wild Card Round: Numbers (unaired); Quick Fire Round: Geek TV (Emily); British kings and queens (Ryan)
3	"Episode 3"	26 July 2015
Nerd War: The teams are challenged to a castle-building competition. The teams are first given two hours to draft the blueprints for their creations. Each castle must be designed to withstand enemy fire and weather conditions, using a maximum of 272 building blocks and 250 wooden pegs; in addition, they must include four walls, a window, and a door. Afterwards, the teams are given 40 minutes to build their castles. They are then judged by art director Paul Inglis and actor Kristian Nairn. The team with the judges' favorite castle is awarded an extra cannonball. Using a catapult, the teams take turns launching their cannonballs at the opposing castle. The team with the most building blocks left standing wins.; Nerd-Off: Mark vs. Hannah; Wild Card Round: Anagrams; Quick Fire Round: Board games (Mark); Middle-earth (Hannah)
4	"Episode 4"	2 August 2015
Nerd War: Three members from each team compete in a debate about various nerd-related topics, including Doctor Who, Game of Thrones, and Harry Potter. The teams are judged by comedian Katherine Ryan and actor David Bradley. The team with the most points after three rounds wins the challenge.; Nerd-Off: Matt vs. Karen; Wild Card Round: Timelines (unaired); Quick Fire Round: Space science (Matt); Turner Prize winners (Karen)
5	"Episode 5"	9 August 2015
Nerd War: The teams are tasked with navigating tablet-controlled quadcopters through an obstacle course. While one team attempts to fly their quadcopter through the course, the opposing team is given the opportunity to shoot it down with Nerf guns to impede their progress. Passing through the large gates is worth one point, while passing through the smaller "doom gates" is worth two points. After both teams complete their timed runs, the team with the highest score is declared the winner.; Nerd-Off: Emily vs. Yasmeen; Wild Card Round: Spelling bee; Quick Fire Round: Anime/manga (Emily); Star Trek (Yasmeen)
6	"Episode 6"	16 August 2015
Nerd War: The teams are instructed to use math and physics to estimate how many panes of glass, arranged in a vertical array, will be broken by two falling objects: a 3 kg ball and a 7.25 kg teddy bear. The two experiments are then performed. The teams are penalised for the difference in the actual panes broken versus their estimate. The team with the lowest overall penalty wins.; Nerd-Off: Kenny vs. Kerry; Wild Card Round: Name the year (unaired); Quick Fire Round: Maths (Kenny); Harry Potter (Kerry); Note: Following the Nerd-Off, teams are officially dissolved and subsequent Nerd Wars become individual challenges.
7	"Episode 7"	23 August 2015
Nerd War: While riding a broomstick attached to a zip-line, the contestants attempt to score as many points as possible by hitting targets with potions during their descent. The nerds are provided two potions by default; however, they can earn up to three additional potions by successfully completing a three-round quiz. The bullseye is worth three points, the inner ring is worth two points, and the outer ring is worth one point. The contestant with the highest score is given the opportunity to nominate another competitor for the Nerd-Off, while the contestant with the lowest score is automatically put up for elimination.; Nerd-Off: Matt vs. Curtis; Wild Card Round: Nerdy locations (unaired); Quick Fire Round: Periodic table (Matt); Superhero films (Curtis)
8	"Episode 8"	30 August 2015
Nerd War: The contestants compete in a quiz bowl based on various nerd topics. The first two nerds to answer five questions correctly earn a spot in the final Nerd-Off.; Nerd-Off: The final two contestants compete in a series of games called the "Nerdliminator". The finalists must petition the banished nerds to pledge their allegiance towards them. The eliminated competitors then choose which finalist to help during the challenge. The finalists can call upon their allies for assistance during the first two games; however, the remaining challenges must be fought alone. The first player to reach four points is crowned "King of the Nerds".
