= Production of Harry Potter and the Deathly Hallows =

Harry Potter and the Deathly Hallows
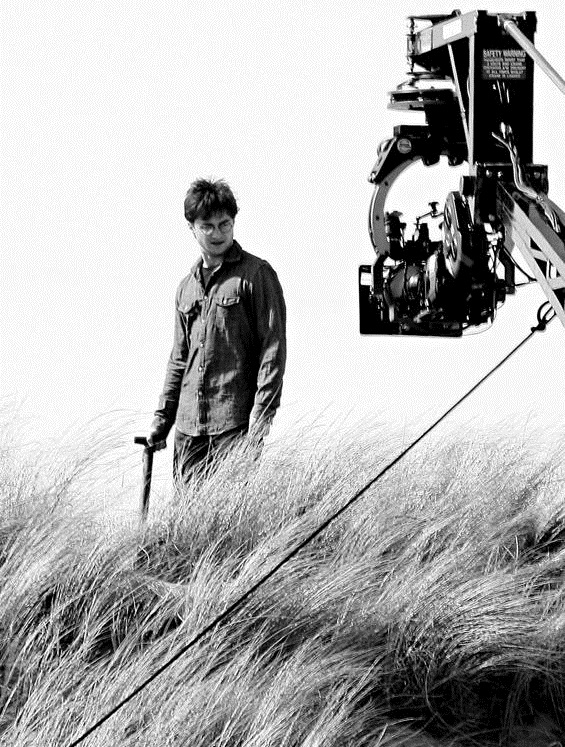
- Daniel Radcliffe filming for Harry Potter and the Deathly Hallows at Freshwater West, Pembrokeshire in May 2009
- Directed by: David Yates
- Screenplay by: Steve Kloves
- Based on: Harry Potter and the Deathly Hallows by J. K. Rowling
- Produced by: David Heyman; David Barron; J. K. Rowling
- Starring: Daniel Radcliffe; Rupert Grint; Emma Watson; Helena Bonham Carter; Robbie Coltrane; Warwick Davis; Ralph Fiennes; Michael Gambon; Brendan Gleeson; Richard Griffiths; John Hurt; Rhys Ifans; Jason Isaacs; Gary Oldman; Alan Rickman; Fiona Shaw; Maggie Smith; Timothy Spall; Imelda Staunton; David Thewlis; Julie Walters
- Cinematography: Eduardo Serra
- Edited by: Mark Day
- Music by: Alexandre Desplat
- Production companies: Warner Bros. Pictures; Heyday Films
- Distributed by: Warner Bros. Pictures
- Release dates: 19 November 2010 (Part 1); 15 July 2011 (Part 2)
- Running time: 146 minutes (Part 1); 130 minutes (Part 2); 276 minutes (total)
- Countries: United Kingdom; United States
- Language: English
- Budget: $250 million
- Box office: $960.9 million (Part 1) $1.342 billion (Part 2) $2.303 billion (total)

Production of Harry Potter and the Deathly Hallows, the 2010/2011 two-part finale of the Harry Potter film series, began in 2009. Both Part 1 and Part 2 were directed by David Yates and written by Steve Kloves. The two movies also collectively form the screen adaptation of the 2007 novel of the same name by J. K. Rowling. The picture was produced by Rowling, alongside David Heyman and David Barron. It was originally set to be released as one movie, but due to its long running time, Warner Bros. Pictures divided the film into two parts.

Both parts were shot simultaneously; principal photography began on 19 February 2009 and was completed on 12 June 2010, with reshoots for the epilogue scene taking place in December 2010. Part 1 was released in 2D and IMAX on 19 November 2010, and Part 2 was released in 3D, 2D and IMAX on 15 July 2011.

== Development ==
The idea to divide J. K. Rowling's final book into two parts came from "creative imperative" and was suggested by executive producer Lionel Wigram. David Heyman initially responded negatively, but Wigram asked, "No, David. How are we going to do it?". Having reread the book and discussed it with Steve Kloves when the 2007–08 Writers Guild of America strike ended, and having Rowling's approval, he agreed with the division. Deathly Hallows was shot back-to-back, and treated as if it were one film during principal photography. Heyman said of the project, "Over ten years ago, we made a commitment to Jo Rowling that, above all else, we would be faithful and true to the spirit of her books, and ever since we have endeavored never to compromise on the creative ambitions of the films."

In concluding the film franchise, we recognized that Harry Potter and the Deathly Hallows is packed with vital plot points that complete the story arcs of all of its beloved characters. That said, we feel that the best way to do the book, and its many fans, justice is to expand the screen adaptation of Harry Potter and the Deathly Hallows and release the film in two parts.

— Jeff Robinov, Warner Bros. press release on 13 March 2008

Before David Yates was officially chosen to direct, others had expressed an interest in the job. Alfonso Cuarón, director of Harry Potter and the Prisoner of Azkaban, had said that he would be tempted to return to direct. Guillermo del Toro, who passed on Prisoner of Azkaban, had expressed interest in directing Deathly Hallows, but an increased workload over the production of The Hobbit ruled him out of the project. Chris Columbus, director of Harry Potter and the Philosopher's Stone and Harry Potter and the Chamber of Secrets, had longed to helm another installment after just producing Prisoner of Azkaban and wished to return to direct Deathly Hallows, but Yates was chosen to direct it.

For the first time in the series, Rowling was credited as a film producer alongside David Heyman and David Barron; however, David Yates noted that her participation in the filmmaking process did not change from the previous films. Heyman stated that the films are a closer recreation of the books than the previous films because of the length a two-part adaptation entails. Steve Kloves wrote the first part's script before starting his work on the second part in April 2009.

Daniel Radcliffe said, "This is a road movie, particularly in Part 1 of the film. People have been so used to seeing Harry Potter at Hogwarts and we're just not there for the first part of the film. That seems to have really freshened things up, and hopefully will get people seeing the films with fresh eyes again, because it's just a totally different look when you're not just sat in the same room the whole time." He also commented on the relationship between Harry and Voldemort in Part 2 saying that "Voldemort does absolutely kick six bells out of me, and that's what makes it effective, the fact that Harry's a kid having the crap beaten out of him. If it's Voldemort killing an adult – well, he does that loads in the films. To see him brutalising and desperately trying to kill a 17-year-old boy is hopefully going to shake some people up."

As maintained by producer David Heyman and director David Yates, Part 1 and Part 2 were treated as one film during production, but are ultimately two different films with separate tones and styles, connected only by the "linear narrative that runs through the middle". Yates commented on the contrast between the two parts, saying that Part 1 is a "road movie" and "quite real", "almost like a vérité documentary", while Part 2 is "much more operatic, colourful and fantasy-oriented", a "big opera with huge battles."

Yates and Heyman have noted that some of the events of the seventh book had an effect on the way the sixth film was written.

== Filming (2009–2010) ==
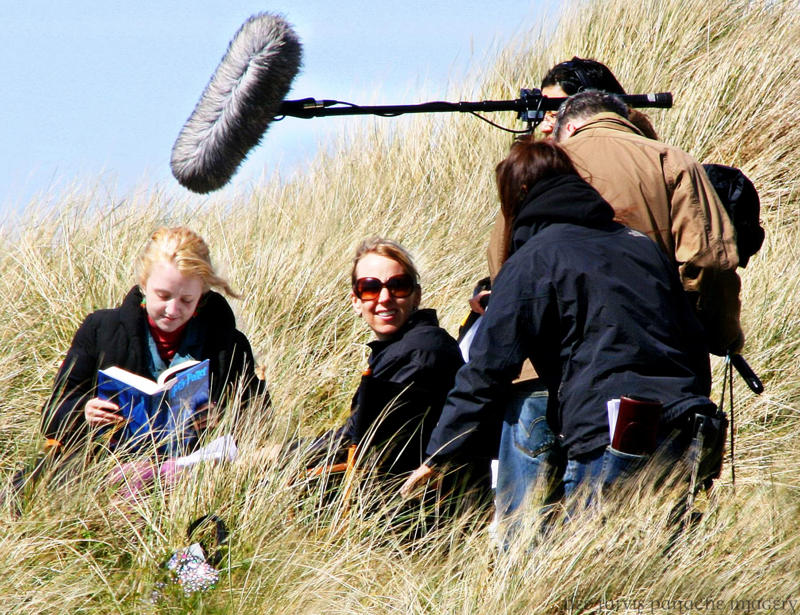
Evanna Lynch reading Harry Potter and the Order of the Phoenix on the Deathly Hallows set in May 2009.

Pre-production began on 26 January 2009, while filming began on 19 February 2009 at Leavesden Studios, where the previous six instalments were filmed. Pinewood Studios became the second studio location for shooting the seventh film. Bruno Delbonnel, the director of photography of the sixth film, opted not to work on Deathly Hallows, as he was afraid of repeating himself. Eduardo Serra was brought on as director of photography for both Part 1 and Part 2. Director David Yates said that the films would be shot with "loads of hand-held cameras." He stated, "I want to shake things up every time I go into this world. I like experimenting as we go along." In October 2009, Ralph Fiennes started filming his role as Lord Voldemort. Many of the adult actors also prepared for filming during this period. The crew also shot on location, with Swinley Forest being the main outdoor filming area, along with the village of Lavenham in Suffolk and the streets of the city of London.

Filming at Pinewood Studios was concluded on 26 March 2010. However, Leavesden Studios was still occupied for further filming. Both Part 1 and Part 2 were filmed over a year and a half period throughout the UK, finishing on 12 June 2010. Even though the shooting schedule was set at 250 days, the filming took 478 days to complete. Radcliffe, Grint, and Watson all openly wept on the last day, which seemed to end their ten years of work on the films. However, reshoots were confirmed to begin in the winter of 2010 for the film's final scene, "19 Years Later", which originally took place in London at King's Cross station. The filming was completed in December 2010, marking the franchise's official closure of ten years of filming.

On 28 January 2009, during production at Leavesden, Radcliffe's stunt double David Holmes suffered a serious spinal injury during the filming of an aerial sequence, which left him paralysed. Holmes fell to the ground following an explosion which was part of the stunt. He is credited in the finished film as a stunt performer, and would be the subject of a 2023 documentary titled David Holmes: The Boy Who Lived, on which Radcliffe served as executive producer.

=== The Deathly Hallows documentary ===
During filming of Deathly Hallows, British filmmaker Morgan Matthews shot a documentary highlighting the filmmaking process and the lives of the cast and crew on set. Producer David Heyman said that "[It] shows the challenges of making the film – the tolls it takes on the actors and crew. It's not just pure gloss and everybody's happy. It's real. At the same time, it's really, really funny." Matthews had access to various creative departments behind the scenes as well as on set filming.

=== The Golden Board ===
Throughout the production of Deathly Hallows, the filmmakers formed a video which showed cast and crew members holding up a board which displayed how many days they were into production and how many days left until the end. Some of the footage included actor Robbie Coltrane playing air guitar, production staff waving goodbye and the final scene of Daniel Radcliffe, Rupert Grint, and Emma Watson. The last shot was of director David Yates "getting into his car and driving away out of Leavesden" as confirmed by David Heyman.
