= David Holmes (stunt performer) =

British actor and stunt performer (born 1983)

David Holmes MBE
- Born: 2 July 1983 (age 43); Leigh-on-Sea, Essex, England
- Occupations: author; stunt double; activist
- Years active: 2001–present

David Michael Holmes MBE (born 2 July 1983) is a British former stunt performer and gymnast, best known for his work on the Harry Potter films. Following an on-set accident in 2009 that left him paralysed, he is now a published author, podcast host, and disability rights activist.

== Early life and career ==
Holmes grew up in Leigh-on-Sea, Essex. He was a daredevil and competitive gymnast as a child. After seeing him jump from his bedroom window onto the trampoline in the garden, his mother signed him up for the local gymnastics club. In 1997, through his gymnastics club, he landed a role as a “stunt kid” for sci-fi movie Lost In Space (1998), starring Friends actor Matt LeBlanc. For his stunt career, he trained in gymnastics, trampolining, high diving, kick boxing, horse riding, and swimming.

Holmes worked as Daniel Radcliffe's stunt double for Harry Potter in the first six Harry Potter films. Holmes was spotted as a potential Radcliffe double by stunt coordinator Greg Powell, who asked him to do a broomstick test for director Chris Columbus. “I found myself in this wonderful studio strapped to the back of a truck, getting towed down the runway, dragging my feet along the floor.... That's how I got the job."

Describing doing stunts as his "calling in life", Holmes said doubling for Radcliffe was "the best job in the world." "I had the time of my life on the Harry Potter set. I was the first person to play Quidditch on a broomstick." In addition to doubling for Radcliffe, he occasionally also doubled for Tom Felton as Draco Malfoy and played a Slytherin beater in Harry Potter and the Philosopher's Stone. "It was an amazing experience. I loved it and Dan was an absolute pleasure to work with. The cast and crew were like a second family."

== Harry Potter accident and aftermath ==
On 28 January 2009, while rehearsing a stunt sequence on a wire for Harry Potter and the Deathly Hallows – Part 1, Holmes, then 25 years old, was hurled into a wall and broke his neck, leaving him permanently paralysed from the chest down. "I was filming a scene where Harry fights a snake and I remember hitting the wall and my chest folding into my nose. I was fully conscious for the whole thing. I knew I had broken my neck." When stunt director Greg Powell ran over and squeezed his hand, he could not feel anything. Another stuntman on set described him as looking like a "puppet with strings cut", as he was "sagging" while hanging from the wire. Holmes underwent multiple surgeries, and spent seven months at the Royal National Orthopaedic Hospital in Stanmore; Radcliffe, Felton, and Matthew Lewis regularly visited him while he was there.

As well as his paralysis, Holmes describes suffering from PTSD from his accident, and had difficulty adjusting to his new life. “I have gone from being able to stand on my hands for half an hour at a time and then all of a sudden I can’t sit up in bed." He initially turned to drugs to cope with his injury. He requires 24-hour care, and his condition is degenerative. Due to a cyst on his spine, he progressively loses function, and is expected to someday lose the ability to talk, eat, and breathe on his own. “I go through the stages of grief with every muscle group I lose."

Holmes was credited for additional stunts on Mortdecai (2015). However he was not involved in the filming, Holmes recalled “I was booked on Mortdecai to sit in my wheelchair to sit in the back of a restaurant as a fight routine kicks off. I never made it to work that day because of an infection, but because they booked me they put on the credit list.”

Holmes started Ripple Productions, along with two friends who are also paralysed. In 2020, they launched a podcast with Daniel Radcliffe, called Cunning Stunts, where they interview other stunt actors to raise awareness about the risks they face. Holmes participates in charity events to raise money for hospitals and advocates for disability rights. After becoming disabled, he took up automobile racing, driving a car with hand controls rather than foot pedals. Holmes' girlfriend, Rosie, is also paralysed. "It took me to break my neck to meet the woman of my dreams."

In 2023, a documentary about Holmes's life, accident, and friendship with Daniel Radcliffe, David Holmes: The Boy Who Lived, was released. It premiered at Doc NYC on 13 November 2023 before being released on HBO two days later. Radcliffe, who served as the film's executive producer and is featured throughout, said Holmes is "an incredibly important person in my life." The documentary was well received by critics and the general public.

"The film is a coming-of-age story of stuntman David Holmes, a prodigious teenage gymnast from Essex, England, who is selected to play Daniel Radcliffe’s stunt double in the first ‘Harry Potter’ film, when Daniel is just 11. Over the next 10 years, the two form an inextricable bond, but on the penultimate film a tragic accident on set leaves David paralyzed with a debilitating spinal injury, turning his world upside down. As Daniel and his closest stunt colleagues rally to support David and his family in their moment of need, it is David’s extraordinary spirit of resilience that becomes their greatest source of strength and inspiration."

In 2024, Holmes published a memoir, The Boy Who Lived, which captures his thrills working on the Harry Potter films and the lows of his life in the wake of his accident. In 2025, he was selected to voice Stan Shunpike, the conductor of the Knight Bus, in a new all-star audiobook of Harry Potter and the Prisoner of Azkaban for Audible.

Despite his life-changing accident, Holmes does not regret participating in the Harry Potter films. "The experience and the character of Harry Potter meant so much to me," he said. "I always tell myself that my stunts in those films were pivotal moments in the story. Harry Potter is a safe space for a lot of people. It's a gift for humanity and I will always be proud of that."

Holmes was appointed Member of the Order of the British Empire (MBE) in the 2026 Birthday Honours for services to film, media and to charity.

== Filmography ==
=== Stunts ===
Year	Title	Role	Notes
1998	Lost In Space	Stunts	Uncredited
2001	Harry Potter and the Philosopher's Stone	Harry Potter stunt double	Uncredited
2002	Harry Potter and the Chamber of Secrets	Harry Potter stunt double	Uncredited
2004	Harry Potter and the Prisoner of Azkaban	Harry Potter stunt double	Uncredited
2005	Green Street Hooligans	Stunt performer	
2005	Harry Potter and the Goblet of Fire	Harry Potter stunt double	Uncredited
2007	The Last Legion	Romulus Augustus stunt double	
2007	Ruddy Hell! It's Harry and Paul	Stunts	3 episodes
2007	Harry Potter and the Order of the Phoenix	Harry Potter stunt double	Uncredited
2007	My Boy Jack	Stunt performer	Television film
2007	The Golden Compass	Stunts	
2007	National Treasure: Book of Secrets	Stunts	
2008	Doomsday	Stunt performer	
2008	Mutant Chronicles	Stunt performer	
2008	Inkheart	Utility stunts	
2009	Harry Potter and the Half-Blood Prince	Harry Potter stunt double	Uncredited
2010	Prince of Persia: The Sands of Time	Young Bis stunt double	
2010	Harry Potter and the Deathly Hallows – Part 1	Harry Potter stunt double	
2015	Mortdecai	Additional stunt performer	credited only

=== Other ===
Year	Title	Role	Notes
2000	Bedazzled	Student	uncredited
2001	Harry Potter and the Philosopher's Stone	Slytherin Beater	Mistakenly credited as "Adrian Pucey"
2002	Harry Potter and the Chamber of Secrets	Slytherin Beater No. 1	
2023	David Holmes: The Boy Who Lived	Self	HBO Max Documentary
