= David Holmes: The Boy Who Lived =

2023 documentary film

- Directed by: Dan Hartley
- Starring: David Holmes
- Composer: Tandis Jenhudson
- Countries of origin: United Kingdom; United States
- Original language: English

Production
- Executive producers: Daniel Radcliffe; Simon Chinn; Jonathan Chinn; Nancy Abraham; Poppy Dixon
- Cinematography: Tim Cragg; Peter Emery; Chris Openshaw; Kris Vankay
- Editor: Kevin Konak
- Production companies: HBO Documentary Films; Sky Documentaries; Lightbox

Original release
- Network: HBO
- Release: 15 November 2023

David Holmes: The Boy Who Lived is a 2023 documentary film about David Holmes, a stunt double who was paralysed after a stunt testing accident during production on Harry Potter and the Deathly Hallows – Part 1. It was executive-produced by Harry Potter star Daniel Radcliffe. Holmes broke his neck in January 2009, had medical complications and years of physical therapy, and now is able to move one of his arms.
