= Chang-ho =

- Hangul: 창호
- RR: Changho
- MR: Ch'angho

Chang-ho is a Korean given name.

== People ==
People with this name include:

=== Sportspeople ===
- Kim Chang-ho (table tennis) (fl. 1960s), North Korean table tennis player
- Choi Chang-ho (born 1964), South Korean boxer
- Song Chang-ho (born 1986), South Korean football midfielder
- Lee Chang-ho (baseball) (born 1987), South Korean baseball player
- Lee Chang-ho (footballer) (born 1989), South Korean football midfielder

=== Other ===
- Ahn Changho (1878–1938), Korean independence activist
- Cho Chang-ho (soldier) (1930–2006), South Korean soldier held prisoner in North Korea for 43 years
- Bae Chang-ho (born 1953), South Korean film director
- Chung Chang-ho (born 1967), South Korean judge on the International Criminal Court
- Kim Chang-ho (climber) (1969–2018), South Korean mountain climber
- Cho Chang-ho (film director) (born 1972), South Korean film director
- Lee Chang-ho (born 1975), South Korean professional Go player

== See also ==
- List of Korean given names
