= Harry Potter and the Deathly Hallows – Part 2 =

2011 film by David Yates

- Theatrical release poster
- Directed by: David Yates
- Screenplay by: Steve Kloves
- Based on: Harry Potter and the Deathly Hallows by J. K. Rowling
- Produced by: David Heyman; David Barron; J. K. Rowling
- Starring: Daniel Radcliffe; Rupert Grint; Emma Watson; Helena Bonham Carter; Robbie Coltrane; Warwick Davis; Ralph Fiennes; Michael Gambon; John Hurt; Jason Isaacs; Gary Oldman; Alan Rickman; Maggie Smith; David Thewlis; Julie Walters
- Cinematography: Eduardo Serra
- Edited by: Mark Day
- Music by: Alexandre Desplat
- Production companies: Warner Bros. Pictures; Heyday Films
- Distributed by: Warner Bros. Pictures
- Release dates: 7 July 2011 (Trafalgar Square); 15 July 2011 (United Kingdom and United States)
- Running time: 130 minutes
- Countries: United Kingdom; United States
- Language: English
- Budget: $250 million (shared with Part 1)
- Box office: $1.380 billion

Harry Potter and the Deathly Hallows – Part 2 is a 2011 fantasy film directed by David Yates from a screenplay by Steve Kloves. It is the second of two cinematic parts based on the 2007 novel by J. K. Rowling, and the eighth and final instalment of the Harry Potter film series. The film follows Harry as he continues his quest to find and destroy Lord Voldemort's Horcruxes in order to destroy him once and for all.

The film stars an ensemble cast comprising Daniel Radcliffe as Harry Potter, and Rupert Grint and Emma Watson as Harry's best friends, Ron Weasley and Hermione Granger, alongside Helena Bonham Carter, Robbie Coltrane, Warwick Davis, Ralph Fiennes, Michael Gambon, John Hurt, Jason Isaacs, Gary Oldman, Alan Rickman, Maggie Smith, David Thewlis, and Julie Walters. Principal photography began on 19 February 2009, and was completed on 12 June 2010, with reshoots taking place in December 2010.

Harry Potter and the Deathly Hallows – Part 2 was released by Warner Bros. Pictures in the United Kingdom and United States on 15 July 2011, and is the only Harry Potter film to be released in 3D. The film was praised as a satisfying conclusion to the saga, and for the visual effects, performances, action sequences, direction, musical score, and cinematography. It grossed over $1.3 billion worldwide, becoming the third-highest-grossing film ever during its run, and the highest-grossing film in the Harry Potter series. The National Board of Review named Deathly Hallows – Part 2 one of the top-ten films of 2011. It was nominated for three awards at the 84th Academy Awards, and received numerous other accolades.

== Plot ==
After burying Dobby, Harry Potter asks the goblin Griphook to help him, Ron Weasley, and Hermione Granger break into Bellatrix Lestrange's vault at Gringotts bank, suspecting a Horcrux is there. Griphook agrees, in exchange for the Sword of Gryffindor. Wandmaker Ollivander tells Harry that two wands taken from Malfoy Manor (Note: As depicted in Harry Potter and the Deathly Hallows – Part 1 (2010)) belonged to Bellatrix and Draco Malfoy; he senses Draco's wand has changed its allegiance to Harry when he took it from Draco. A horcrux, Helga Hufflepuff's cup, is found in Bellatrix's vault, but Griphook snatches the sword and abandons them. Trapped by security, they release the dragon guardian and flee Gringotts on its back.

Harry has a vision of Lord Voldemort at Gringotts, furious at the theft. Harry also realises a Horcrux connected to Rowena Ravenclaw is hidden at Hogwarts. The trio apparate into Hogsmeade and Albus Dumbledore's brother Aberforth helps them, revealing that he was the one who sent Dobby to Malfoy Manor. He reveals a secret passageway into Hogwarts's Room of Requirement and summons Neville Longbottom to lead them back into the school.

As Severus Snape threatens the school staff and students, Harry reveals himself. Professor McGonagall duels Snape and forces him to flee before rousing Hogwarts for battle. Luna Lovegood advises Harry to consult Helena Ravenclaw's ghost, who reveals that Voldemort used dark magic on her mother's diadem before hiding it in the Room of Requirement. In the Chamber of Secrets, Ron and Hermione destroy the Horcrux cup with a Basilisk fang. Draco, Blaise Zabini, and Goyle attack Harry, but Ron and Hermione intervene. Goyle casts a Fiendfyre curse that kills him, while Harry, Ron, and Hermione rescue Draco and Zabini and escape. Harry stabs the diadem with the Basilisk fang, and Ron kicks it into the fire.

As Voldemort's army attacks, Harry realises Voldemort's snake Nagini is the final Horcrux. The trio overhears Voldemort telling Snape the Elder Wand cannot serve him until Snape dies, as he killed Dumbledore, the wand's previous master. Nagini mortally wounds Snape. As he dies, he gives Harry one of his memories. Many members of the Order, students, and staff, including Fred Weasley, Remus Lupin, and Nymphadora Tonks, are killed in battle.

Harry views Snape's memory in the Pensieve: Snape and Harry's mother Lily were childhood friends; he was also in love with her, but she fell for Harry's father James, whom Snape despised for his arrogance and for bullying him. Harry also learns Snape attempted to protect Lily by pleading with Dumbledore to hide the Potters. Following her death, Snape worked with Dumbledore as a double agent among the Death Eaters, including agreeing to kill him. Harry sees Snape conjure the Patronus doe that led Harry to Gryffindor's sword. Harry also learns that he inadvertently became a Horcrux when Voldemort's curse originally failed to kill him; Voldemort must now kill Harry to destroy the soul shard within him. Using the Resurrection Stone that had been stored in the Golden Snitch bequeathed to him, Harry sees the spirits of his parents, Sirius Black, and Remus. They comfort him before he returns to Voldemort in the Forbidden Forest. Voldemort casts the Killing Curse upon Harry, who awakens in limbo. Dumbledore's spirit meets him and explains that Harry is now free of the link to Voldemort and can choose to return to his body or move on.

Voldemort returns with Harry's apparently dead body and demands Hogwarts surrender. As Neville takes the Sword of Gryffindor from the Sorting Hat, Harry reveals he is alive, and the Malfoys abandon Voldemort along with many other Death Eaters. Molly Weasley kills Bellatrix in the Great Hall, and Neville beheads Nagini, destroying the last Horcrux. Harry defeats Voldemort when his Expelliarmus deflects Voldemort's Killing Curse back at him. After the battle, Harry explains to Ron and Hermione that Voldemort never commanded the Elder Wand; it recognised him as its true master after disarming Draco, who had disarmed Dumbledore before he was killed by Snape. Instead of claiming the Elder Wand, Harry chooses to destroy it.

Nineteen years later, Harry, Ginny Weasley, Ron, Hermione, and Draco watch as their children depart on the train at King's Cross for Hogwarts.

== Cast ==
- Daniel Radcliffe as Harry Potter: A 17-year-old wizard.
- Rupert Grint as Ron Weasley: A young wizard and one of Harry's best friends.
- Emma Watson as Hermione Granger: A young witch and one of Harry's best friends.
- Helena Bonham Carter as Bellatrix Lestrange: A Death Eater and the aunt of Draco Malfoy. Bonham Carter also plays Hermione Granger when she disguises as Bellatrix.
- Robbie Coltrane as Rubeus Hagrid: Harry's half-giant friend and the gamekeeper at Hogwarts.
- Ralph Fiennes as Lord Voldemort: An evil power-hungry wizard and the leader of the Death Eaters.
- Michael Gambon as Professor Albus Dumbledore: The previous headmaster of Hogwarts killed by Severus Snape.
- John Hurt as Garrick Ollivander: A wandmaker abducted by the Death Eaters.
- Jason Isaacs as Lucius Malfoy: Draco's father and a disgraced Death Eater.
- Kelly MacDonald as Helena Ravenclaw: The ghost of the house of Ravenclaw. MacDonald replaced Nina Young in the role.
- Gary Oldman as Sirius Black: Harry's deceased godfather.
- Alan Rickman as Professor Severus Snape: A double agent to the Death Eaters and the headmaster of Hogwarts.
- Maggie Smith as Professor Minerva McGonagall: A teacher at Hogwarts.
- Matthew Lewis as Neville Longbottom:One of Harry's closest friends becomes a guerilla fighter against Voldemort and his powerful Lackeys.
- David Thewlis as Remus Lupin: A member of the Order of the Phoenix and former teacher at Hogwarts.
- Bonnie Wright as Ginny Weasley
- Evanna Lynch as Luna Lovegood

Also reprising their roles are Warwick Davis as Filius Flitwick, a teacher at Hogwarts, and also as Griphook, a goblin and former employee at the bank Gringotts; David Bradley as Argus Filch, the caretaker of Hogwarts; Gemma Jones as Poppy Pomfrey, the sole healer at Hogwarts; Miriam Margolyes as Pomona Sprout, a teacher at Hogwarts; Julie Walters, Mark Williams, James and Oliver Phelps, Clémence Poésy, and Natalia Tena as Order of the Phoenix members Molly Weasley, Arthur Weasley, Fred and George Weasley, Fleur Delacour, and Nymphadora Tonks; Tom Felton as Draco Malfoy, Lucius's son and a Death Eater; Helen McCrory as Narcissa Malfoy, Draco's mother and Bellatrix's sister; Dave Legeno as Fenrir Greyback, a werewolf and supporter of Voldemort; and Nick Moran as Scabior, a bounty hunter for Voldemort. Ciarán Hinds portrays Aberforth Dumbledore, Albus Dumbledore's brother and the owner of the pub Hog's Head, replacing Jim McManus from Part 1.

In the novel, several characters that have not appeared since the earlier novels return in the climatic battle at Hogwarts. Director David Yates said that he wanted to bring back a lot of the characters that had previously appeared in the film series. Additional actors reprising their roles from previous films are Emma Thompson as Sybill Trelawney, Jim Broadbent as Horace Slughorn, George Harris as Kingsley Shacklebolt, Domhnall Gleeson as Bill Weasley, Matthew Lewis as Neville Longbottom, Devon Murray as Seamus Finnigan, Jessie Cave as Lavender Brown, Katie Leung as Cho Chang, Afshan Azad as Padma Patil, Anna Shaffer as Romilda Vane, Georgina Leonidas as Katie Bell, Freddie Stroma as Cormac McLaggen, Josh Herdman as Gregory Goyle, Scarlett Byrne as Pansy Parkinson, Leslie Phillips as the voice of the Sorting Hat, Geraldine Somerville as Lily Potter, and Adrian Rawlins as James Potter.

== Production ==
=== Filming ===
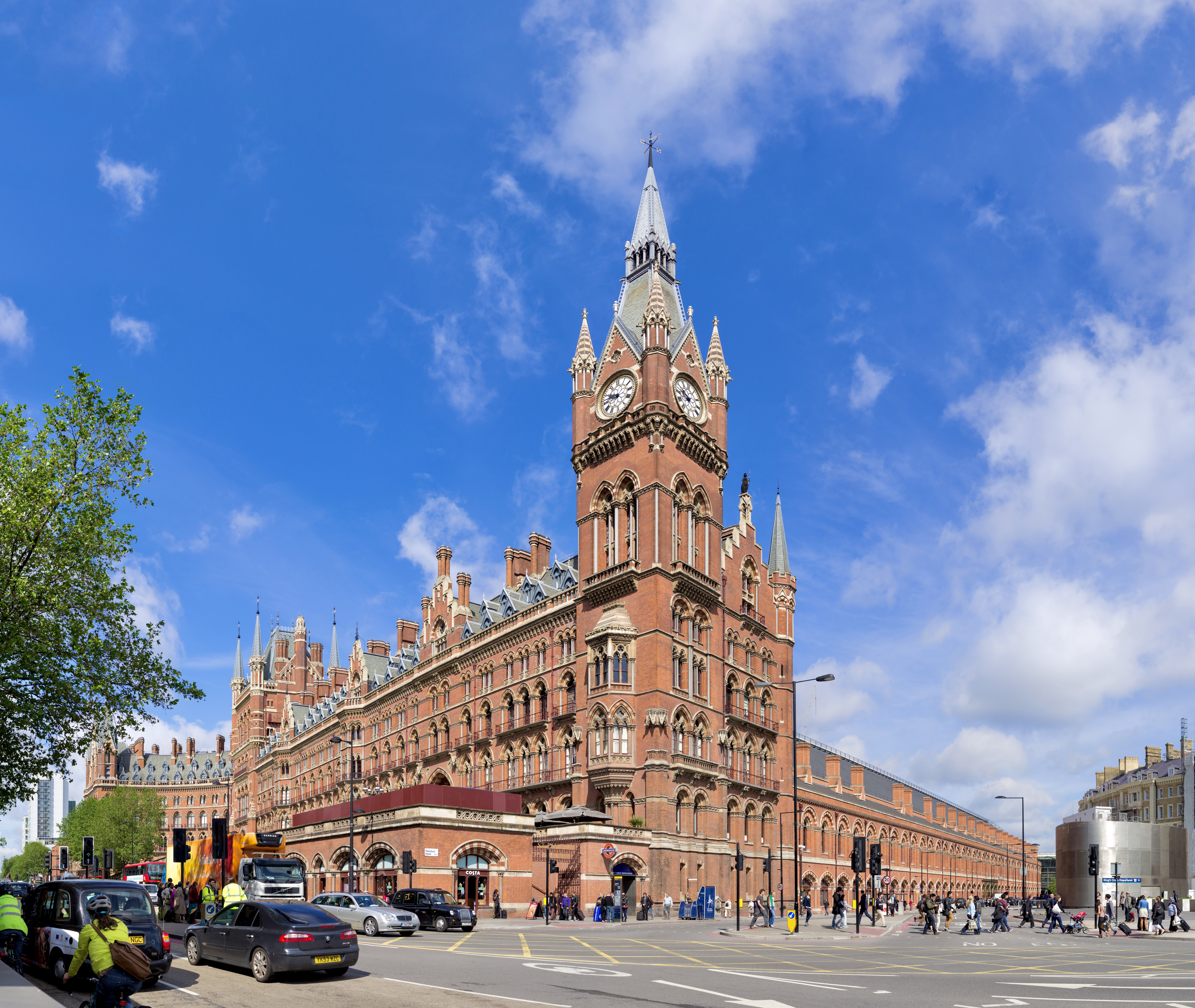
St Pancras serves as the opening shot of the film's "nineteen years later" epilogue.

Part 2 was filmed back-to-back with Harry Potter and the Deathly Hallows – Part 1 from 19 February 2009 to 12 June 2010, with reshoots for the epilogue scene taking place at Leavesden Film Studios on 21 December 2010. Yates, who shot the film with director of photography Eduardo Serra, described Part 2 as "operatic, colourful and fantasy-oriented", a "big opera with huge battles".

Originally set for a single theatrical release, the idea to split the book into two parts was suggested by executive producer Lionel Wigram due to, what David Heyman called, "creative imperative". Heyman initially responded negatively to the idea, but Wigram asked, "No, David. How are we going to do it?". After rereading the book and discussing it with screenwriter Steve Kloves, he agreed with the division.

=== Set design ===
In an interview with Architectural Digest, production designer Stuart Craig remarked on creating sets for Part 2. Of the Gringotts Wizarding Bank, he said, "our banking hall, like any other, is made of marble and big marble columns. And it has great strength. The fact that the goblins are the bankers and tellers at the counter helps that feeling of grandeur and solidity and the big proportions. That was part of the fun of the set: we exaggerated the size of it, we exaggerated the weight of it, and we even exaggerated the shine of the marble." About the multiplication of treasure in one of the bank's vaults, he noted, "We made literally thousands of pieces for it and vacuum metallised them to be shiny gold and silver. John Richardson, the special effects supervisor, made a floor that was capable of rising on different levels, so there was kind of a physical swelling of the treasure on it."

Craig spoke about the Battle of Hogwarts to Art Insights Magazine, saying that "the great challenge is the destruction of Hogwarts. The sun rising behind the smoke ... the massive remains of destroyed walls, the entrance hall, the entrance of the Great Hall, part of the roof of the Great Hall completely gone, so yeah. A big challenge there and an enjoyable one really – maybe it helped me and the guys in the art department sort of prepare for the end ... we demolished it before we had to strike it completely." When asked about the King's Cross scene near the end of the film, Craig said, "We experimented a lot, quite honestly. I mean it was quite a protracted process really but we did experiment the sense of it being very burnt out very very kind of white – so we experimented with underlit floors, we experimented with different kind of white covering everything: white paint, white fabric, and the cameraman was involved in how much to expose it, and a series of camera tests were done, so we got there but with a great deal of preparation and research."

=== Visual effects ===
Visual effects supervisor Tim Burke said that "It was such a major job to stage the Battle of Hogwarts, and we had to do it in different stages of production. We had shots with complex linking camera moves from wide overviews, to flying into windows and interior spaces. So, we took the plunge at the end of 2008, and started rebuilding the school digitally with Double Negative." He went on to say: "It's taken two years – getting renders out, texturing every facet of the building, constructing interiors to see through windows, building a destruction version of the school. We can design shots with the knowledge that we have this brilliant digital miniature that we can do anything with. With a practical Hogwarts, we would have shot it last summer and been so tied down. Instead, as David Yates finds the flow and structure, we are able to handle new concepts and ideas."

On the quality of 3D in film, Burke told Los Angeles Times, "I think it's good, actually. I think people are going to be really pleased. I know everyone's a little nervous and sceptical of 3D these days, but the work has been done very, very well. We've done over 200 shots in 3D and in the visual effects as well, because so much of it is CGI, so the results are very, very good. I think everyone's going to be really impressed with it, actually." Producer David Heyman spoke to SFX magazine about the 3D conversion, saying that "The way David Yates is approaching 3D is he's trying to approach it from a character and story point of view. Trying to use the sense of isolation, of separation that sometimes 3D gives you, to heighten that at appropriate moments. So we're approaching it in a storytelling way."

For the film's epilogue, the main cast were made to look older through makeup and special effects. After the initial look of their aged appearances were leaked online, some fans opined that Radcliffe and Grint looked too old while Watson did not appear significantly different. After primary filming concluded in June 2010, Yates examined the footage and concluded that the problem could not be resolved through editing or CGI, and had the sequence re-shot that December with redesigned makeup.

=== Music ===
It was originally planned that John Williams, who composed the scores for the first three instalments, would return to compose the final film's score, but he was unavailable due to scheduling conflicts. It was confirmed that the composer for Part 1, Alexandre Desplat, was set to return for Part 2. In an interview with Film Music Magazine, Desplat stated that scoring Part 2 is "a great challenge" and that he has "a lot of expectations to fulfill and a great deal of work" ahead of him. In a separate interview, Desplat also made note that Williams's themes will be present in the film "much more than in Part 1". The soundtrack for the film was nominated for Best Score Soundtrack for Visual Media at the 54th Annual Grammy Awards.

== Marketing ==
In March 2011, the first preview for Deathly Hallows – Part 2 was released, revealing new footage and new interviews from the starring cast. The first United States poster was released on 28 March 2011, with the caption "It All Ends 7.15" (referring to its international release date). On 27 April 2011 the first theatrical trailer for Part 2 was released. The trailer revealed a range of new and old footage. The IMAX trailer for the film was released with IMAX screenings of Pirates of the Caribbean: On Stranger Tides on 20 May 2011. During the MTV Movie Awards on 5 June 2011, Emma Watson presented a sneak peek of the film.

== Release ==
=== Theatrical ===
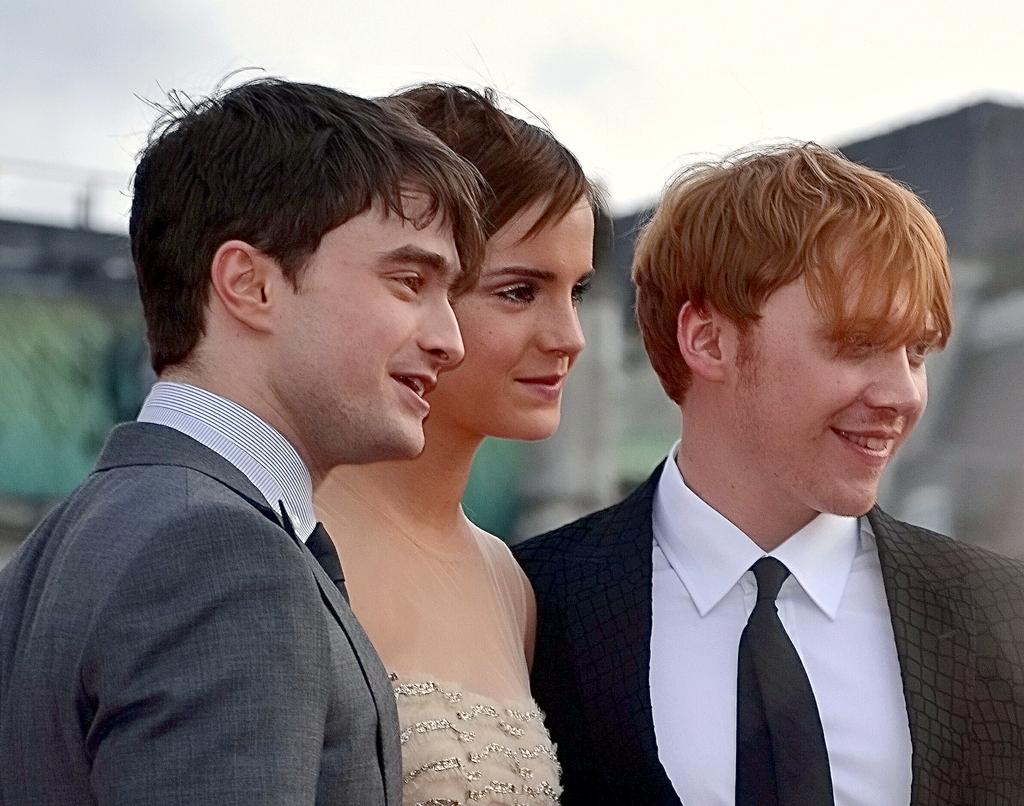
Daniel Radcliffe, Emma Watson and Rupert Grint at the premiere of Harry Potter and the Deathly Hallows – Part 2 on 7 July 2011 at Trafalgar Square in London

On 2 April 2011, a test screening of the film was held in Chicago, with Yates, Heyman, Barron and editor Mark Day in attendance. The film had its world premiere on 7 July 2011 at Trafalgar Square in London. The United States premiere was held in New York City at Lincoln Center on 11 July 2011. Although filmed in 2D, the film was converted into 3D in post-production and was released in both RealD 3D, IMAX 3D and 4DX.

The film was originally scheduled to open in Indonesia on 13 July 2011. The Indonesian government levied a new value added tax on royalties from foreign films in February 2011, causing three film studios, including Warner Bros. Pictures, to halt the importation of their films, including Harry Potter and the Deathly Hallows – Part 2 into the country. The film was not released to cinemas in the Kingdom of Jordan due to recently enforced taxes on films.

On 10 June, one month before release, tickets went on sale. On 16 June 2011, Part 2 received a 12A certificate from the British Board of Film Classification, who note that the film "contains moderate threat, injury detail and language", becoming the only Harry Potter film to receive a warning for "injury detail". At midnight on 15 July, Part 2 screened in 3,800 cinemas. In the United States, it played in 4,375 cinemas, 3,100 3D cinemas and 274 IMAX cinemas, the widest release for an IMAX, 3D, 4DX and Harry Potter film. In Southeast Asia, the film premiered on 16 July 2011 on Screen Red.

=== Home media ===
Harry Potter and the Deathly Hallows – Part 2 was released on 11 November 2011 in the United States in four formats: a one-disc standard DVD, a two-disc standard DVD special edition, a one-disc standard Blu-ray, and three-Disc Blu-ray 2D Combo Pack (Blu-ray + DVD + Digital Copy). In the United Kingdom and Ireland, the film was released on 2 December 2011 in three formats: a two-disc standard DVD, a three-disc Blu-ray 2D Combo Pack (Blu-ray + DVD + Digital Copy), and a four-disc Blu-ray 3D Combo Pack (Blu-ray 3D + Blu-ray 2D + DVD + Digital Copy). The film set the record for fastest-selling pre-order DVD and Blu-ray on Amazon.com, just two days into the pre-order period.

Deathly Hallows – Part 2 sold 2.71 million Blu-ray units ($60.75 million) in three days (Friday to Sunday). It also sold 2.83 million DVD units ($42.22 million) during its debut. By 18 July 2012 it had sold 4.71 million Blu-ray units ($99.33 million) and 6.47 million DVD units ($88.96 million).

On 28 March 2017, Deathly Hallows – Part 2 made its Ultra HD Blu-ray debut, along with Deathly Hallows - Part 1, The Half-Blood Prince, and Order of the Phoenix.

== Reception ==
=== Box office ===
Box office records set by Harry Potter and the Deathly Hallows – Part 2 upon its release
Record item	Record detail
Opening weekend (US/Canada)	$169,189,427
Summer opening weekend (US/Canada)	$169,189,427
Opening weekend for a 3D film (US/Canada)	$169,189,427
Opening weekend – IMAX (US/Canada)	$15,200,000
Opening weekend – IMAX (worldwide)	$23,200,000
Biggest IMAX midnight release (US/Canada)	$2,000,000
Opening weekend (worldwide)	$483,189,427
Opening weekend outside the US and Canada	$314,000,000
Opening day and single day (US/Canada)	$91,071,119
Biggest midnight release (US/Canada)	$43,500,000
Highest gross in advance ticket sales (US/Canada)	$32,000,000
Widest 3D launch (US/Canada)	3,100+ locations
Highest-grossing film of 2011	$1,342,511,219
July opening (US/Canada)	$169,189,427
Highest-grossing fantasy live-action film	$381,011,219

Prior to its release, the film was predicted by box office analysts to break records, citing the anticipation built up over the course of 10 years. Harry Potter and the Deathly Hallows – Part 2 grossed $381.4 million in the United States and Canada, along with $960.8 million in other markets, for a worldwide total of $1.342 billion. In worldwide earnings, it was the third-highest-grossing film, the highest-grossing film of 2011, the highest-grossing film in the Harry Potter franchise, and the highest-grossing book adaptation. It also became the highest-grossing film for Warner Bros. until 2023's Barbie, as well as the highest-grossing release from parent company WarnerMedia, surpassing The Lord of the Rings: The Return of the King. Part 2 set a worldwide opening-weekend record with $483.2 million. This record would be held for four years before Jurassic World took it in 2015. The film set a worldwide IMAX opening-weekend record with $23.2 million. It set the worldwide record as the fastest film to gross $500 million (6 days), $600 million (8 days), $700 million (10 days), $800 million (12 days), and $900 million (15 days). On 30 July 2011, the film crossed the $1 billion mark, tying the 19-day record that had been set by Avatar. It was also the fastest Warner Bros. film to cross that mark until Barbie surpassed it in 2023, passing it in 17 days.

==== United States and Canada ====
In the US and Canada, the film became the 13th-highest-grossing film at the time of its release, the highest-grossing film of 2011, the highest-grossing Harry Potter film, the highest-grossing children's book adaptation, the highest-grossing fantasy/live action film and the 13th-highest-grossing 3D film. Box Office Mojo estimates that the film sold more than 40 million tickets. It set new records in advance ticket sales with $32 million, in its midnight opening with $43.5 million and in its IMAX midnight opening with $2 million. It grossed $91.1 million on its opening Friday, setting a Friday-gross record as well as single- and opening-day records. It also set an opening-weekend record with $169.2 million, an IMAX opening-weekend record of $15.2 million and opening-weekend record for a 3D film. Although 3D enhanced the film's earning potential, only 43% of the opening gross came from 3D venues. This means only $72.8 million of the opening-weekend grosses originated from 3D showings, the second-largest number at the time.

It also scored the largest three-day and four-day gross, the sixth-highest-grossing opening week (Friday to Thursday) with $226.2 million, and even the seventh-largest seven-day gross. It fell precipitously by 84% on its second Friday and by 72% during its second weekend overall, grossing $47.4 million, which is the largest second-weekend drop for any film that opened to more than $90 million. Still, it managed to become the fastest-grossing film in the franchise and also achieved the second-largest ten-day gross ever at the time (now eighth). In its third weekend, the movie surpassed Harry Potter and the Philosopher's Stone to become the highest-grossing film of the franchise in the US & Canada.

==== Other territories ====
Harry Potter and the Deathly Hallows – Part 2 became the third-highest-grossing film, the highest-grossing 2011 film, the highest-grossing Warner Bros. film and the highest-grossing Harry Potter film. On its opening day, Deathly Hallows – Part 2 grossed $43.6 million from 26 countries, placing it 86% ahead of Deathly Hallows – Part 1 and 49% higher than Half-Blood Prince. From Wednesday until Sunday, on its 5-day opening weekend, it set an opening-weekend record outside the US and Canada by earning $314 million. The average 3D share of Deathly Hallows – Part 2 was 60%, which was lower than the 3D share for Transformers: Dark of the Moon (70%) and On Stranger Tides (66%). On its second weekend, it held to the top spot, but fell precipitously by 62% to $120.2 million despite minor competition. This amount is about the same as what On Stranger Tides made from its second weekend ($124.3 million). Deathly Hallows – Part 2 was in first place at the box office outside North America for four consecutive weekends.

In the United Kingdom, Ireland and Malta it brought in a record $14.8 million on its first day. On its opening weekend it earned £23,753,171 in the United Kingdom, marking the second largest opening weekend in 2011. Its performance did not surpass that of Harry Potter and the Prisoner of Azkaban in 2004, which earned £23,882,688 on its opening weekend. In United States dollars, its opening weekend was an all-time record $38.3 million, ahead of Harry Potter and the Order of the Phoenix ($33.5 million). The film also achieved the largest single-day gross on its first Saturday and the largest opening week with $57.6 million. The film made a total of £73.1 million ($117.2 million) at the United Kingdom box office, making it the tenth-highest-grossing film. It also is the highest-grossing film of 2011 and the highest-grossing Wizarding World film.

Deathly Hallows – Part 2 also set opening-day records in Mexico ($6.1 million), Australia ($7.5 million), France and the Maghreb region ($7.1 million), Italy ($4.6 million), Sweden ($2.1 million), Norway ($1.8 million), Denmark ($1.6 million), the Netherlands ($1.7 million), Belgium ($1.4 million), the Czech Republic ($2.0 million), Argentina ($961,000), Finland ($749,000) and Hong Kong ($808,000). It also established new Harry Potter opening-day records in Japan ($5.7 million), Brazil ($4.4 million), Russia and the CIS ($4.2 million), Spain ($3.3 million) and Poland ($1.25 million).

Deathly Hallows – Part 2 set opening day records in India with ₹15 crore ($3.41 million), Australia with $19.6 million, New Zealand with $2.46 million, Brazil with $11. million, Scandinavia with $18.5 million, Mexico with $15.9 million and many other Latin American and European countries.

=== Critical response ===
On Rotten Tomatoes, the film has an approval rating of 96% based on 333 reviews, with an average score of 8.3/10. The site's critical consensus reads, "Thrilling, powerfully acted, and visually dazzling, Deathly Hallows Part II brings the Harry Potter franchise to a satisfying – and suitably magical – conclusion." On Metacritic, which assigns a normalised rating to reviews, the film has a score of 85 out of 100 based on 41 reviews, indicating "universal acclaim". The film received a score of 93 from professional critics at the Broadcast Film Critics Association; it is the organisation's highest-rated Harry Potter film. Audiences surveyed by CinemaScore gave the film an average grade of "A" on an A+ to F scale.

Philip Womack in The Daily Telegraph commented, "This is monumental cinema, awash with gorgeous tones, and carrying an ultimate message that will resonate with every viewer, young or old: there is darkness in all of us, but we can overcome it." He further expressed that David Yates "transmutes [the book] into a genuinely terrifying spectacle." Another review was released on the same day from Evening Standard, who rated the film four out of five and stated "Millions of children, parents, and those who should know better won't need reminding what a Horcrux is – and director David Yates does not let them down. In fact, in some ways, he helps make up for the shortcomings of the final book." The Daily Express remarked that the film showcases "a terrifying showdown that easily equals Lord of the Rings or Star Wars in terms of a dramatic and memorable battle between good and evil".

Roger Ebert of the Chicago Sun-Times gave the film three and a half stars out of four and said, "The finale conjures up enough awe and solemnity to serve as an appropriate finale and a dramatic contrast to the lighthearted (relative) innocence of Harry Potter and the Sorcerer's Stone all those magical years ago." Mark Kermode from the BBC said that the film is a "pretty solid and ambitious adaptation of a very complex book", but he criticised the post-converted 3D. Christy Lemire of the Associated Press gave the film three and a half out of four and said "While Deathly Hallows: Part 2 offers long-promised answers, it also dares to pose some eternal questions, and it'll stay with you after the final chapter has closed." Richard Roeper, also from the Chicago Sun-Times, gave the film an A+ rating and said: "This is a masterful and worthy final chapter in one of the best franchises ever put to film."

In one of the few negative reviews, Brian Gibson of Vue Weekly described the film as "deadly dull" and a "visual overstatement". Other reviews criticised the decision to split the novel into two cinematic parts, with Ben Mortimer of The Daily Telegraph writing "Deathly Hallows – Part 2 isn't a film. It's HALF a film ... it's going to feel somewhat emotionless." Other critics wrote of the film's runtime; Alonso Duralde from The Wrap said, "If there's one substantial flaw to the film, it's that this cavalcade of people and places and objects can barely fit in the 130-minute running time." Rebecca Gillie of The Oxford Student gave the film two out of five and wrote: "At the end of [the film] there is nothing that stays with you once you've left the cinema."

=== Accolades ===
At the 84th Academy Awards, Harry Potter and the Deathly Hallows – Part 2 received nominations for Best Art Direction, Best Makeup, and Best Visual Effects. Its other nominations include four British Academy Film Awards (winning one) and four Critics' Choice Movie Awards (winning two). The National Board of Review named Deathly Hallows – Part 2 one of the ten best films of 2011.

== Future ==
In July 2016, Warner Bros. Entertainment, Inc. applied to purchase the rights to the stage play Harry Potter and the Cursed Child, a follow-up to Deathly Hallows, leading to speculation that the stage play was being planned to be adapted into a film. In November 2021, Chris Columbus, who directed the first two instalments of the film series, expressed interest in directing an adaptation of Cursed Child with the intent of having the main cast members reprise their roles. In March 2022, when The New York Times asked Radcliffe whether he would return to his role as Harry Potter, he replied that he was not interested at the moment, but did not deny the possibility of doing so in the future.

In a Sunday Times interview in August 2025, Columbus confirmed that he maintains close relationships with the original cast but has not spoken to Rowling in "a decade or so". He went on to state that the controversy over Rowling's views on transgender people meant that a film adaptation of The Cursed Child with the original cast was "never going to happen". In a later interview with Variety, Columbus spoke of "separating the artist from the art" and described the controversy around Rowling as "just sad, it's very sad", while noting that he does not agree with her views.

== See also ==
- List of films about witchcraft
