= Cho Chang-ho =

- Hangul: 조창호
- RR: Jo Changho
- MR: Cho Ch'angho

Cho Chang-ho, a Korean name consisting of the family name Cho and the given name Chang-ho, may refer to:

- Cho Chang-ho (military officer)
- Cho Chang-ho (film director)
