= Lee Chang-ho (disambiguation) =

Lee Chang-ho (born 1975) is a South Korean Go player of 9-dan rank.

Lee Chang-ho may also refer to:

- Lee Chang-ho (table tennis) (born 1969), South Korean para table tennis player
- Lee Chang-ho (baseball) (born 1987), South Korean pitcher
- Lee Chang-ho (footballer) (born 1989), South Korean footballer
