= List of accolades received by Harry Potter and the Deathly Hallows – Part 2 =

Harry Potter and the Deathly Hallows – Part 2 accolades
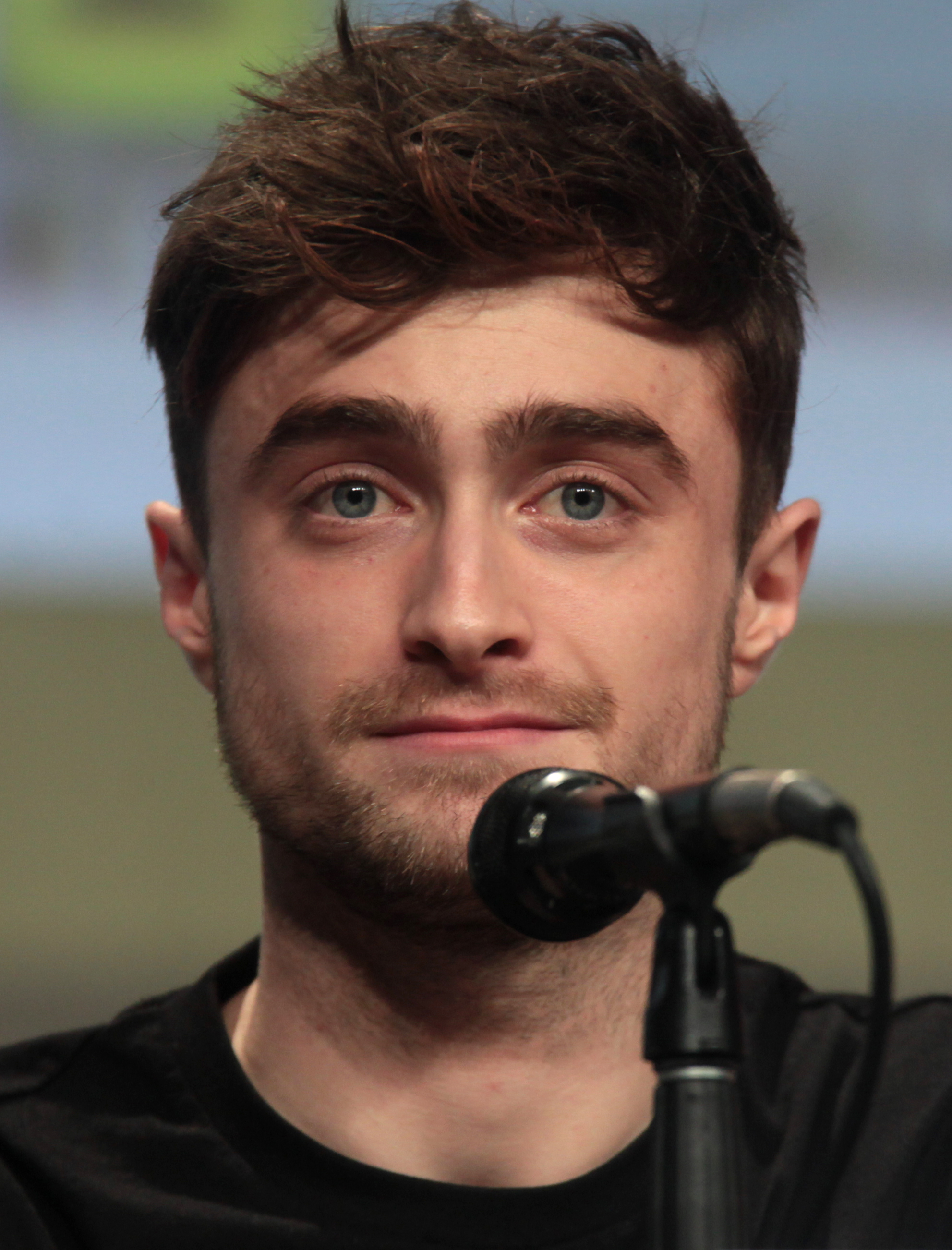
- Daniel Radcliffe received multiple awards and nominations for reprising his role in the film.
Awards and nominations
Award	Wins	Nominations

Totals (Note: Certain award groups do not simply award one winner. They acknowledge several different recipients, have runners-up, and have third place. Since this is a specific recognition and is different from losing an award, runner-up mentions are considered wins in this award tally. For simplification and to avoid errors, each award in this list has been presumed to have had a prior nomination.)
- Wins: 37
- Nominations: 101

Harry Potter and the Deathly Hallows – Part 2 is a 2011 fantasy film directed by David Yates from a screenplay by Steve Kloves. It is the sequel to Harry Potter and the Deathly Hallows – Part 1 (2010) as the second of a two-part adaptation of the 2007 novel Harry Potter and the Deathly Hallows by J. K. Rowling, and the eighth and final instalment in the Harry Potter film series. The film stars Daniel Radcliffe, Rupert Grint, Emma Watson, Helena Bonham Carter, Robbie Coltrane, Warwick Davis, Ralph Fiennes, Michael Gambon, John Hurt, Jason Isaacs, Gary Oldman, Alan Rickman, Maggie Smith, David Thewlis, and Julie Walters. Its story concludes Harry Potter's (Radcliffe) quest to find and destroy Lord Voldemort's (Fiennes) Horcruxes in order to stop him once and for all.

Harry Potter and the Deathly Hallows – Part 2 premiered at Trafalgar Square in London on 7 July 2011, and was released in the United Kingdom and the United States on 15 July. Produced on a budget of $250 million, (Note: Shared with Harry Potter and the Deathly Hallows – Part 1 (2010)) it grossed $1.342 billion, finishing its theatrical run as the highest-grossing film of 2011 and the third-highest-grossing film of all time. On the review aggregator website Rotten Tomatoes, the film holds an approval rating of 96% based on 333 reviews.

Harry Potter and the Deathly Hallows – Part 2 garnered awards and nominations in various categories with particular recognition for its acting (mainly that of Radcliffe), musical score, production design, and visual effects. It received three nominations at the 84th Academy Awards, including Best Visual Effects. At the 65th British Academy Film Awards, the film was nominated for Best Production Design, Best Sound, and Best Makeup and Hair, and won Best Special Visual Effects. It received four nominations at the 17th Critics' Choice Awards and won two awards. Composer Alexandre Desplat received a nomination for Best Score Soundtrack for Visual Media at the Grammy Awards' 54th ceremony. The film won one of ten nominations at the 38th Saturn Awards. In addition, the National Board of Review selected The Deathly Hallows – Part 2 as one of the top-ten films of 2011.

== Accolades ==
Accolades received by Harry Potter and the Deathly Hallows – Part 2
Award	Date of ceremony	Category	Recipient(s)	Result	Ref.
Academy Awards	26 February 2012	Best Art Direction	Stuart Craig and Stephenie McMillan	Nominated	
Academy Awards	26 February 2012	Best Makeup	Nick Dudman, Amanda Knight, and Lisa Tomblin	Nominated	
Academy Awards	26 February 2012	Best Visual Effects	Tim Burke, David Vickery, Greg Butler, and John Richardson	Nominated	
Alliance of Women Film Journalists Awards	10 January 2012	Best Actor in a Supporting Role	Alan Rickman	Nominated	
Art Directors Guild Awards	4 February 2012	Excellence in Production Design for a Fantasy Film	Stuart Craig	Won	
BMI Film & TV Awards	17 May 2012	BMI Film Music Awards	Alexandre Desplat	Won	
Britannia Awards	30 November 2011	Artistic Excellence in Directing	David Yates (Note: Also for Harry Potter and the Order of the Phoenix (2007), Harry Potter and the Half-Blood Prince (2009), and Harry Potter and the Deathly Hallows – Part 1 (2010))	Won	
British Academy Children's Awards	27 November 2011	Feature Film	Harry Potter and the Deathly Hallows – Part 2	Won	
British Academy Children's Awards	27 November 2011	Kid's Vote — Film	Harry Potter and the Deathly Hallows – Part 2	Won	
British Academy Film Awards	12 February 2012	Best Production Design	Stuart Craig and Stephenie McMillan	Nominated	
British Academy Film Awards	12 February 2012	Best Special Visual Effects	Tim Burke, John Richardson, Greg Butler, and David Vickery	Won	
British Academy Film Awards	12 February 2012	Best Sound	James Mather, Stuart Wilson, Stuart Hilliker, Mike Dowson, and Adam Scrivener	Nominated	
British Academy Film Awards	12 February 2012	Best Makeup and Hair	Amanda Knight and Lisa Tomblin	Nominated	
Costume Designers Guild Awards	21 February 2012	Excellence in Fantasy Film	Jany Temime	Won	
Critics' Choice Movie Awards	12 January 2012	Best Art Direction	Stuart Craig	Nominated	
Critics' Choice Movie Awards	12 January 2012	Best Visual Effects	Harry Potter and the Deathly Hallows – Part 2	Nominated	
Critics' Choice Movie Awards	12 January 2012	Best Sound	Harry Potter and the Deathly Hallows – Part 2	Won	
Critics' Choice Movie Awards	12 January 2012	Best Makeup	Harry Potter and the Deathly Hallows – Part 2	Won	
Empire Awards	25 March 2012	Best Film	Harry Potter and the Deathly Hallows – Part 2	Won	
Empire Awards	25 March 2012	Best Actor	Daniel Radcliffe	Nominated	
Empire Awards	25 March 2012	Best Director	David Yates	Won	
Empire Awards	25 March 2012	Best 3D	Harry Potter and the Deathly Hallows – Part 2	Nominated	
Empire Awards	25 March 2012	Best Female Newcomer	Bonnie Wright	Nominated	
Evening Standard British Film Awards	4 February 2012	Blockbuster of the Year	Harry Potter and the Deathly Hallows – Part 2	Won	
Golden Trailer Awards	31 May 2012	Best Action TV Spot	"Every Journey" (Aspect Ratio)	Nominated	
Golden Trailer Awards	31 May 2012	Best Graphics in a TV Spot	"Triumphant Review" (Mojo LLC.)	Nominated	
Golden Trailer Awards	31 May 2012	Best Action Poster	"Companion One Sheets" (WORKS ADV)	Nominated	
Grammy Awards	12 February 2012	Best Score Soundtrack for Visual Media	Alexandre Desplat	Nominated	
Hollywood Film Awards	24 October 2011	Hollywood Movie Award	Harry Potter and the Deathly Hallows – Part 2	Won	
Houston Film Critics Society Awards	7 January 2012	Best Original Score	Alexandre Desplat	Nominated	
Hugo Awards	2 September 2012	Best Dramatic Presentation, Long Form	David Yates and Steve Kloves	Nominated	
ICG Publicists Awards	24 February 2012	Maxwell Weinberg Publicists Showmanship Motion Picture Award	Harry Potter and the Deathly Hallows – Part 2	Nominated	
International Film Music Critics Association Awards	23 February 2012	Best Original Score for a Fantasy/Science Fiction/Horror Film	Alexandre Desplat	Nominated	
MTV Movie Awards	3 June 2012	Movie of the Year	Harry Potter and the Deathly Hallows – Part 2	Nominated	
MTV Movie Awards	3 June 2012	Best Male Performance	Daniel Radcliffe	Nominated	
MTV Movie Awards	3 June 2012	Best Female Performance	Emma Watson	Nominated	
MTV Movie Awards	3 June 2012	Best Hero	Daniel Radcliffe	Won	
MTV Movie Awards	3 June 2012	Best Kiss	Rupert Grint and Emma Watson	Nominated	
MTV Movie Awards	3 June 2012	Best Fight	Daniel Radcliffe vs. Ralph Fiennes	Nominated	
MTV Movie Awards	3 June 2012	Best Cast	Daniel Radcliffe, Rupert Grint, Emma Watson, and Tom Felton	Won	
National Board of Review Awards	1 December 2011	Top 10 Films	Harry Potter and the Deathly Hallows – Part 2	Won (Note: This award does not have a single winner, but recognizes multiple films.)	
National Movie Awards	10 May 2011	Must See Movie of the Summer	Harry Potter and the Deathly Hallows – Part 2	Won	
Nickelodeon Kids' Choice Awards (Australia)	7 October 2011	Fave Movie	Harry Potter and the Deathly Hallows – Part 2	Won	
Nickelodeon Kids' Choice Awards (United States)	31 March 2012	Favorite Movie	Harry Potter and the Deathly Hallows – Part 2	Nominated	
Nickelodeon Kids' Choice Awards (United States)	31 March 2012	Favorite Movie Actor	Daniel Radcliffe	Nominated	
Nickelodeon Kids' Choice Awards (United States)	31 March 2012	Favorite Movie Actress	Emma Watson	Nominated	
People's Choice Awards	11 January 2012	Favorite Movie	Harry Potter and the Deathly Hallows – Part 2	Won	
People's Choice Awards	11 January 2012	Favorite Action Movie	Harry Potter and the Deathly Hallows – Part 2	Won	
People's Choice Awards	11 January 2012	Favorite Movie Ensemble	Harry Potter and the Deathly Hallows – Part 2	Won	
People's Choice Awards	11 January 2012	Favorite Book Adaptation	Harry Potter and the Deathly Hallows – Part 2	Won	
People's Choice Awards	11 January 2012	Favorite Movie Actor	Daniel Radcliffe	Nominated	
People's Choice Awards	11 January 2012	Favorite Movie Star (Under 25)	Daniel Radcliffe	Nominated	
People's Choice Awards	11 January 2012	Favorite Movie Star (Under 25)	Rupert Grint	Nominated	
People's Choice Awards	11 January 2012	Favorite Movie Star (Under 25)	Emma Watson	Nominated	
People's Choice Awards	11 January 2012	Favorite Movie Star (Under 25)	Tom Felton	Nominated	
San Diego Film Critics Society Awards	14 December 2011	Best Ensemble	Harry Potter and the Deathly Hallows – Part 2	Won	
San Diego Film Critics Society Awards	14 December 2011	Best Production Design	Stuart Craig	Nominated	
San Diego Film Critics Society Awards	14 December 2011	Best Original Score	Alexandre Desplat	Won	
San Diego Film Critics Society Awards	14 December 2011	Best Adapted Screenplay	Steve Kloves	Nominated	
Satellite Awards	18 December 2011	Best Original Score	Alexandre Desplat	Nominated	
Satellite Awards	18 December 2011	Best Visual Effects	Tim Burke, John Richardson, David Vickery, and Greg Butler	Nominated	
Satellite Awards	18 December 2011	Best Sound	Dave Patterson, Lon Bender, Robert Fernandez, and Victor Ray Ennis	Nominated	
Saturn Awards	26 July 2012	Best Fantasy Film	Harry Potter and the Deathly Hallows – Part 2	Won	
Saturn Awards	26 July 2012	Best Director	David Yates	Nominated	
Saturn Awards	26 July 2012	Best Supporting Actor	Ralph Fiennes	Nominated	
Saturn Awards	26 July 2012	Best Supporting Actor	Alan Rickman	Nominated	
Saturn Awards	26 July 2012	Best Supporting Actress	Emma Watson	Nominated	
Saturn Awards	26 July 2012	Best Production Design	Stuart Craig	Nominated	
Saturn Awards	26 July 2012	Best Editing	Mark Day	Nominated	
Saturn Awards	26 July 2012	Best Costume	Jany Temime	Nominated	
Saturn Awards	26 July 2012	Best Make-up	Nick Dudman and Amanda Knight	Nominated	
Saturn Awards	26 July 2012	Best Special Effects	Tim Burke, Greg Butler, John Richardson, and David Vickery	Nominated	
Scream Awards	15 October 2011	The Ultimate Scream	Harry Potter and the Deathly Hallows – Part 2	Won	
Scream Awards	15 October 2011	Best Scream-Play	Steve Kloves	Won	
Scream Awards	15 October 2011	Best Fantasy Actor	Daniel Radcliffe	Won	
Scream Awards	15 October 2011	Best Villain	Ralph Fiennes	Won	
Scream Awards	15 October 2011	Holy Sh*t Scene of the Year	"Room of Requirement"	Won	
Scream Awards	15 October 2011	Best F/X	Tim Burke	Won	
Scream Awards	15 October 2011	Best Fantasy Movie	Harry Potter and the Deathly Hallows – Part 2	Nominated	
Scream Awards	15 October 2011	Best Director	David Yates	Nominated	
Scream Awards	15 October 2011	Best Fantasy Actress	Emma Watson	Nominated	
Scream Awards	15 October 2011	Best Supporting Actor	Rupert Grint	Nominated	
Scream Awards	15 October 2011	Best Supporting Actor	Alan Rickman	Nominated	
Scream Awards	15 October 2011	Best Ensemble	Harry Potter and the Deathly Hallows – Part 2	Nominated	
Scream Awards	15 October 2011	Fight Scene of the Year	"Final Battle"	Nominated	
Scream Awards	15 October 2011	Fight Scene of the Year	"The Battle of Hogwarts"	Nominated	
Scream Awards	15 October 2011	Best 3-D Movie	Harry Potter and the Deathly Hallows – Part 2	Nominated	
Screen Actors Guild Awards	29 January 2012	Outstanding Performance by a Stunt Ensemble in a Motion Picture	Harry Potter and the Deathly Hallows – Part 2	Won	
St. Louis Film Critics Association Awards	12 December 2011	Best Supporting Actor	Alan Rickman	Nominated	
St. Louis Film Critics Association Awards	12 December 2011	Best Visual Effects	Harry Potter and the Deathly Hallows – Part 2	Won	
Teen Choice Awards	7 August 2011	Choice Summer Movie	Harry Potter and the Deathly Hallows – Part 2	Won	
Teen Choice Awards	7 August 2011	Choice Summer Movie Star – Male	Daniel Radcliffe	Won	
Teen Choice Awards	7 August 2011	Choice Summer Movie Star – Female	Emma Watson	Won	
Visual Effects Society Awards	7 February 2012	Outstanding Visual Effects in a Visual Effects Driven Feature Motion Picture	Tim Burke, Emma Norton, John Richardson, and David Vickery	Nominated	
Visual Effects Society Awards	7 February 2012	Outstanding Animated Character in a Live Action Feature Motion Picture	Yasunobu Arahori, Tom Bracht, Gavin Harrison, and Chris Lentz for "The Gringotts Dragon"	Nominated	
Visual Effects Society Awards	7 February 2012	Outstanding Created Environment in a Live Action Feature Motion Picture	Keziah Bailey, Stephen Ellis, Clement Gerard, and Pietro Ponti for "Hogwarts"	Nominated	
Visual Effects Society Awards	7 February 2012	Outstanding Models in a Feature Motion Picture	Steven Godfrey, Pietro Ponti, Tania Marie Richard, and Andy Warren for "Hogwarts School Buildings"	Nominated	
Visual Effects Society Awards	7 February 2012	Outstanding Compositing in a Feature Motion Picture	Michele Benigna, Martin Ciastko, Thomas Dyg, and Andy Robinson	Nominated	
Washington D.C. Area Film Critics Association Awards	5 December 2011	Best Cast	Harry Potter and the Deathly Hallows – Part 2	Nominated	
Washington D.C. Area Film Critics Association Awards	5 December 2011	Best Art Direction	Harry Potter and the Deathly Hallows – Part 2	Nominated	
World Soundtrack Awards	22 October 2011	Film Composer of the Year	Alexandre Desplat (Note: Also for A Better Life (2011), The Burma Conspiracy (2011), The King's Speech (2010), The Tree of Life (2011), The Well Digger's Daughter (2011), and Harry Potter and the Deathly Hallows – Part 1 (2010))	Won	
