= Cho chang =

Cho chang may refer to:

- Cho chang (Thai: ช ช้าง) the tenth consonant letter in the Thai script
- Cho Chang, a fictional character from the Harry Potter books

== See also ==
- Cho Chang-ho
- Cho Chang-jae
