= Korean War POWs detained in North Korea =

Buses full of Allied POWs who were detained in North Korea are released in Operation Little Switch. Although POWs from other countries were released, South Korean ones were likely not.

Tens of thousands of South Korean soldiers were captured by North Korean and Chinese forces during the Korean War (1950–1953) but were not returned during the prisoner exchanges under the 1953 Korean Armistice Agreement. Most are presumed dead, but the South Korean government estimated in 2007 that some 560 South Korean prisoners of war (POWs) still survived in North Korea. The issue of unaccounted South Korean POWs from the Korean War has been in dispute since the 1953 armistice. North Korea continues to deny that it holds these South Korean POWs. Interest in the issue has been renewed since 1994, when Cho Chang-ho, a former South Korean soldier presumed to have been killed in the war, escaped from North Korea. As of 2008, 79 former South Korean soldiers had escaped from North Korea.

There have also been reports that several hundred US prisoners of war may not have been returned by North Korea, but the vast majority of unaccounted POWs are South Koreans.

== Origins ==
The treatment of prisoners of war and their repatriation were complicated issues during the Korean War. Nominally, both the communist and the United Nations forces were committed to the terms of the 1949 Third Geneva Convention, regarding the treatment of POWs. However, both sides applied exceptions and the negotiations regarding POWs were contentious and difficult.

Korean prisoners were assigned to one of three types of POW camps. Peace camps were for POWs sympathetic to communism, reform camps held highly skilled POWs who were indoctrinated in communist ideologies, and the third type was the normal POW camps. Prisoners in the first two camp types were prized and usually neither exchanged nor released.

The North Koreans viewed South Korean forces not as enemy soldiers, protected by the Geneva Conventions, but as fellow Koreans, who had been led astray into "war crimes against their people" by imperialist forces. According to such reasoning, it was justified to "re-educate" those South Koreans and allow the ones who were fit to volunteer for the North Korean military. That was common practice, and many South Korean POWs had been enlisted in the North Korean military. Although North Korea asserts that all such former South Korean soldiers had volunteered freely, others, including former South Korean POWs who have escaped in recent years, allege that there had been coercion.

When negotiations for POW exchanges began in 1951, the UN Command estimated that 88,000 South Korean soldiers were missing in action (MIA). However the communists claimed to hold only 7,712 South Korean POWs. The UN Command protested the huge discrepancy in their POW estimates and the number given by the communists, and it noted that the number of POWs submitted by the communists was far smaller than the 65,000 South Koreans that the North Koreans and Chinese had claimed to have captured in their own announcements. The communists insisted that many POWs had been killed in UN air raids and died of disease and that all captives who had recognized their crimes of "participating in imperialists' war" had been released at the front and allowed to return to their original army or home town.

The UN Command noted that only about 200 former POWs had returned to UN lines and charged that the communist list was small because many South Korean POWs had been press-ganged into joining the North Korean military. The UN demanded that South Korean POWs in the North Korean military also be repatriated. The communists claimed that all of the former POWs who were serving in their forces had volunteered to do so and refuted that as "a conspiracy to carry away more than one hundred thousand soldiers from the People's Army."

South Korean President Syngman Rhee had been reluctant about the Armistice talks to begin with and was particularly opposed to any involuntary repatriation of former South Koreans to North Korea. Many other South Korean leaders had also been unhappy with the ceasefire negotiations in general, as well as the issue of anti-communist POWs in UN custody. The tensions between the South Koreans and their UN allies erupted when the South Koreans unilaterally released 25,000 anti-communist POWs on June 18 of 1953.

The unilateral release of the anti-communist POWs by South Koreans complicated negotiations. Doing so without resolving the issue of South Korean MIA missing from the POW lists from the communist forces may have been detrimental to the POWs held in North Korea. However, the fact that the communists had begun with such a small list of POWs is an indication that they had little intention of returning many of the South Koreans.

The UN and the communists finally signed the Armistice Agreement on July 27, 1953, a little over a month after the release of the anti-communist POWs by South Korea. That ended the fierce fighting which had continued for two years even as negotiations dragged on. Both the UN and communist forces agreed that POWs who did not desire repatriation would be turned over to a Neutral Nations Repatriation Commission, led by the Indian military, which would interview individual prisoners and allow them to choose their side in a neutral setting. In the following two months, POWs exchanges were carried out under the agreement. The UN Command repatriated 75,823 communist POWs (among them, 70,183 North Koreans), and the communists returned only 12,773 UN POWs. Only 8,726 South Koreans were returned, less than 10% of the total of South Korean MIAs.

== Number of POWs held in North Korea ==
=== South Korean POWs ===
The exact number of South Korean POWs who were detained in North Korea after the war is unknown, as is the number who still survive in North Korea. In its report to the legislature in October 2007, the Korean Ministry of Defense reported that "a total of 41,971 South Korean soldiers were missing during the Korean War, of which 8,726 were repatriated through POW exchanges after the Armistice of 1953. Some 13,836 have been determined to have been killed based on other information. To date, the status of 19,409 soldiers has not been confirmed." Most of these unconfirmed were believed to have been unrepatriated POWs. Other estimates of South Korean POWs held by the North Koreans at the Armistice have been higher. Yi Hang-gu, a writer and North Korea expert currently in South Korea who had served as a Sergeant in the Korean People's Army, has testified that he commanded former South Korean POWs who had been enlisted into the Korean People's Army during the Korean War. Yi's unit, the 22nd Brigade, was composed mostly of former South Korean captives led by North Korean officers and non-commissioned officers. Yi has said the number of South Korean POWs who survived in North Korea at the end of the fighting "could have been about 50,000-60,000." In July 2020 it is reported that 50,000 South Korean POWS were never repatriated from North Korea in 1953.

The South Korean government estimates that 560 South Korean POWs still survive in North Korea. This number is based upon analysis of various testimonies from defectors and former POWs who managed to escape North Korea. Other researchers (e.g. the Korean Institute for National Unification's 2008 White Paper on Human Rights in North Korea) think the actual number of POWs still alive in North Korea could be higher, since many of the POWs who have recently managed to escape had been presumed to have been killed.

=== American and other UN POWs ===
On September 17, 1996, The New York Times reported the possible presence of American POWs in North Korea, citing recently declassified documents. The documents show that the U.S. Defense Department claimed to know in December 1953 that "more than 900 American troops were alive at the end of the war but were never released by the North Koreans." The Pentagon did not confirm the report, saying they had no clear evidence that any American POWs were being held against their will in North Korea, but pledged to continue to investigate accounts of defectors and others who said they had seen American POWs there. The North Korean government has said it is not holding any American soldiers.

== Treatment of POWs by North Korean and Chinese forces ==
North Korea did not recognize the POW status of its South Korean captives, and viewed them as "liberated fighters." Because of this fundamental difference in perspective, captured South Korean soldiers were treated very differently from other UN captives. Articles 49 through 57 of the 1949 Geneva Convention III specifically restrict the use of POW labor for military purposes. However, it was common practice to enlist former South Korean volunteers into its own forces after several weeks of re-education.

Some of the South Koreans were assigned to front line combat units, such as Yi Hang-gu's 22nd Brigade. Many more were assigned to construction units repairing railroads and airfields and disposing unexploded ordnance. This repair work was particularly dangerous due to the heavy air raids on supply lines and airfields in North Korea by UN air forces.

The Chinese forces initially did not recognize the Geneva Conventions and followed its own "Policy of Tolerance". This policy was based upon Confucian codes and traditions where enemy forces who have surrendered are allowed to join their captors. Official Chinese records distinguish between prisoners who were "captured" and those who "surrendered". On July 13 of 1952, the Chinese forces changed their policy and committed to the Geneva Conventions - and demanded full repatriation of its own POWs according to Article 118.

Punishment for transgressions by the South Koreans was harsh. Lieutenant Cho Chang-ho, a former South Korean artillery officer who escaped from North Korea in 1994, testified before the U.S. Congress on April 27, 2006. In 1952 he had been caught trying to escape back to South Korean lines and was sentenced by court martial to thirteen years in prison. He served six years in a political prison camp where conditions were unsanitary and prisoners suffered from malnutrition. There were four other South Korean officer POWs held with Cho, all of whom perished from disease in prison.

Other UN prisoners also suffered horrific treatment. Out of 7,000 US prisoners, 2,800 (40 percent) died in captivity. Diet and medical conditions were notoriously bad. However, other UN prisoners were not enlisted in large numbers into the North Korean forces or made to work for the communist war effort, the way that South Koreans had been. The diet, as bad as it was, was comparable to that of North Korean peasants and medical supplies were unavailable to doctors.

From 1951, the Chinese tried to improve the treatment of POWs after being alarmed by the excessive death rate. The Chinese recognized the propaganda value of POWs and established permanent POW camps in the far North, close to the Yalu River. The Chinese forces also held indoctrination sessions. These sessions gained notoriety for potential brainwashing, though "no confirmed cases of brainwashing came out of the Korean War." One of the oddest events held by the North Koreans and Chinese during this war was the 1952 POW olympics. UN and South Korean POWs gathered together in November 1952 at the Pyuoktong Camp and competed in many athletic matches, including softball and sack races. Although the event was blatantly propagandistic, many of the POWs cooperated since it was their only opportunity to see if comrades in other camps had survived.

South Korean and other UN POWs were also treated differently with regards to the POW exchange. The majority of surviving UN POWs were repatriated or turned over to the Neutral Nations Repatriation Commission in accordance with Section 3 of the Armistice Agreement. South Koreans who had been enlisted into the North Korean construction units were never reported as POWs during the negotiations to begin with. Some of the former South Korean POWs who have escaped reported that they did not even know there was an exchange of POWs.

== Life of POWs in North Korea after the Armistice ==
After the Korean War, the former South Korean POWs were given North Korean citizenship after formally being discharged from their camps and units. Most of them were assigned to work at coal mines near their camps. Although they were nominally full citizens, they faced much discrimination in their employment and residence.

Within North Korea's rigid caste system, they were amongst the lowest castes and were under surveillance by the State Security (secret police) agency. Even though most POWs are now over 70 years old, their movement and residence is still restricted to remote regions and the surveillance by State Security still continues.

The discrimination extended to the children of POWs who were restricted in their careers, barred from membership in the Workers' Party of Korea, college admissions and military service. Mr. Koh Eul Won, a former POW who escaped to South Korea in 2001, testified that "in North Korea, one must complete military service to be treated like a human being. However, our children were rejected by the military solely for the reason of being the children of POWs. Therefore, our children had no choice but to work in the coal mines as we had done." Young-Bok Yoo, who escaped in 2000, also writes about the discrimination and surveillance in his Memoirs.

== South Korean repatriation efforts ==
The Seoul government regards the POW issues as a "basic national responsibility" related to the protection of its citizens. Since the end of the Korean War, the South Korean government has repeatedly raised this POWs issue to North Korea at various meetings. Between 1953 and 1964 Seoul called for the repatriation of POWs 11 times. But North Korea flatly denied any South Korean POWs were being held against their will.

A few months after the first inter-Korean Summit of Jun 15, 2000, the South repatriated all 63 former North Korean agents and guerrillas in its custody who had completed their prison terms in the South and wanted to return to the North. Many in the South criticized the Seoul government for failing to secure the return of South Korean prisoners of war or any civilian abductees in return. The repatriations were a good will gesture and no conditions officially were attached. The South Korea government did expect its gesture to lead to more cooperation and eventual reconciliation between the two sides.

Contrary to the Seoul government's expectation, North Korea only enraged liberals and conservatives alike in the South Korean legislature when it demanded billions of dollars in compensation for alleged atrocities against the repatriated agents. North Korea has consistently refused to discuss the POW issue. During the second inter-Korea summit of October 2007, President Roh Moo-hyun received no response from his North Korean counterpart, Kim Jong-il.

Human rights groups in Korea and other countries have been unhappy with the two previous Presidents, Kim Dae Jung and Roh Moo Hyun with regards to the POW issue. Both the Kim and Roh governments were criticized for being excessively cautious about provoking the North Koreans and "lacking determination" in getting back the POWs. Previously, before the 1990s, South Korea was not a democracy and this issue was not raised by grassroots groups before the government.

The Lee Myung Bak government clarified that the POW and abductee issues was of high priority and raised the issue as one of main agendas for inter-Korean dialogues. It has expressed its commitment to persuade the North to take active and sincere measures, although nothing has changed since the 2008 announcement. It has also created an agency within South Korea's Unification Ministry whose task is to deal with North Korean human rights and POW related issues.

== Appeals for repatriation by NGOs ==
Non-governmental Organizations(NGOs) from around the world have appealed for the repatriation of South Korean POWs.

- The Korea National Red Cross: In 1999. The Korea National Red Cross appealed to international organization to give their attention to the repatriation of hundreds of South Koreans held captive in North Korea. At the time, the Red Cross released a list of 454 South Koreans who had been kidnapped by the North since the end of the war and 231 POWs.
- The National Assembly of South Korea: On 8 December 2000, South Korean Parliament passed the resolution of urging for North Korea to repatriate all detained POWs.
- World Veterans Federation : In November 1997, WVF 22nd General Assembly issued a statement calling for the North Korea to repatriate detained South Korean POWs and abductees.
- Family Union of Korean War POWs Detained in North Korea (국군포로가족회): Founded by detained POWs' families in the South on Feb. 19, 2005. On June 23, 2005, it hosted a press conference to urge the North Korea's immediate repatriation of detained POWs, at the front of the hotel where inter-Korea ministerial talk was being held.
- The International Korean War Foundation Korean War POW Affairs Committee: Advocates on behalf of South Korean POWs from its offices in Los Angeles, CA. The committee had arranged for Lt. Cho Chang Ho (the first former South Korean POW to escape North Korea) to give testimony at the US Congress in 2006.
- MULMANGCHO: Non-profit Organization for South Korean POW
- Korean War POW Affairs in USA

== POWs who have escaped from North Korea ==
In October 1994, Lt. Cho Chang-ho successfully escaped to South Korea. He was the first South Korean POW to have made it out of North Korea since the Korean War ended. Thereafter, during the past decade, as of June 2009, 79 prisoners of war (and about 180 of their family members) have escaped from the North.

In July 2010, a POW was reported to have escaped from North Korea, but was arrested in China and forcibly repatriated. The POW, surnamed Jung, an infantryman of the 3rd Battalion of the Republic of Korea Army, was captured in 1952. After being handed over to North Korea's security forces by the Chinese side's public security bureau, he was reportedly sent to the Yodok concentration camp.

Yoo Young-bok, a POW who escaped from North Korea in 2000, first published his memoirs in 2010, entitled Under Starry Nights in Hell. He wrote under a pseudonym, Yoo Young-chul. In 2012 his memoirs were translated into English under the title Tears of Blood: A Korean POW's Fight for Freedom, Family, and Justice. He also contributed expert testimony for the UN Commission of Inquiry on Human Rights in the DPRK in 2013.

The Database Center for North Korean Human Rights in Seoul, Korea, published a detailed report based on in-depth interviews with 20 of the former POWs who have escaped to South Korea. The interviews cover their capture, their treatment as POWs during and after the war, their lives in North Korea, their escape from North Korea, and their readjustment to life in South Korea.

Former POWs receive back pay and pensions for their military service from the South Korean government once they reach South Korea. This adds up to a significant payment and is much higher than the assistance that typical North Korean refugees receive when they successfully reach South Korea. Information about the South Korea's policy toward former POWs has circulated among POWs in North Korea and that has encouraged them to try to leave. Private "brokers" are also aware of such policies and actively seek former POWs in North Korea and help arrange their escape for hefty fees.

There are NGOs that help former POWs and their families in South Korea. The former POWs are generally happy with their new lives in South Korea. However, many suffer from health problems due to many years of hard labor and depression from concern for their family members who are still in North Korea. Getting their remaining family members out of North Korea is a top priority.

== See also ==
- North Korean abductions of South Koreans
- North Korean abductions of Japanese
- Human rights in North Korea
- Unconverted long-term prisoners
- Remembered Prisoners of a Forgotten War: An Oral History of Korean War POWs
