= Lee Chang-ho (baseball) =

South Korean baseball player

LG Twins – No. 46
- Relief pitcher
- Born: March 9, 1987 (age 39)
- Bats: Right Throws: Right

Teams
- NC Dinos (2012–2013); LG Twins (2014–present)

- Lee Chang-ho
- Hangul: 이창호
- Hanja: 李彰浩
- RR: I Changho
- MR: I Ch'angho

Lee Chang-ho (Korean: 이창호; Hanja: 李彰浩; born March 9, 1987, in Uiwang) is a South Korean relief pitcher who plays for the LG Twins in the Korea Baseball Organization. He bats and throws right-handed.
