= Cho Chang-ho (military officer) =

South Korean military officer (1930–2006)

Cho Chang-ho 조창호
- Born: 2 October 1930; Pyongyang, Heian'nan Province, Korea, Empire of Japan
- Died: 19 November 2006 (aged 76); Seoul, South Korea
- Military career
- Allegiance: South Korea
- Branch: Republic of Korea Army
- Service years: 1950–1951; 1951–1994 (as POW)
- Rank: Lieutenant
- Conflicts: Korean War; Battle of Hanseok Mountain at Inje County

Korean name
- Hangul: 조창호
- Hanja: 趙昌浩
- RR: Jo Changho
- MR: Cho Ch'angho

Cho Chang-ho (Korean: 조창호; October 2, 1930 – November 19, 2006) was a South Korean military officer who served South Korea, during the Korean War.

Cho Chang-ho is known as the first South Korean POW to escape from North Korea after the Korean Armistice Agreement in 1953.

== Early life and education ==
Cho Chang-ho was born in Pyongyang, Heian'nan Province, Korea, Empire of Japan. His family moved to Keijō (Seoul) in 1936. and he graduated from Gyeonggi Commercial High School and entered Yonsei University in 1950.

On 25 June 1950, with the outbreak of Korean War, he entered the Republic of Korea Army in October 1950 and became an ROK Army officer in April 1951.

== Korean War ==
In May 1951, he took part in the Battle of Hanseok Mountain at Inje County and became a POW of the Chinese Army before being deported to North Korea.

He was interned for 43 years in North Korea. After being released from a concentration camp for good behavior in August 1964 and assigned to the Hwa-Poong coal mines in North Pyongyang province, he married. The couple divorced after having three children in five years, as the constant surveillance and North Korean demand that they spy on each other made the marriage very difficult.

== Escape ==
In October 1994, he escaped from North Korea by crossing the Yalu River to China and was helped by some ethnic Koreans in returning to South Korea. He tried to persuade his children to go with him to China, but they did not want to leave North Korea.

In South Korea, he devoted the rest of his life to the repatriation effort of other POWs.

In 2006, he attended United States House Committee on Foreign Affairs and testified about the POW issue.

== Death and legacy ==
In 1995, Cho Chang-ho published his autobiography: "돌아온 사자" ("a returned dead person").

Cho Chang-ho died on 19 November 2006.

Cho's children left behind in North Korea are believed to have been arrested and sent to a labour camp.

== In popular culture ==
Cho Chang-ho has been depicted on-screen by Cha In-pyo in the South Korean movie Albatross.

== See also ==
- Korean War POWs detained in North Korea
