= Draco Malfoy =

Fictional character of the Harry Potter series

- Harry Potter character
- Tom Felton as Draco Malfoy in Harry Potter and the Prisoner of Azkaban
- First appearance: Harry Potter and the Philosopher's Stone (1997)
- Created by: J. K. Rowling
- Portrayed by: Tom Felton (film series); Lox Pratt (television series); Lauren Lopez (A Very Potter Musical)

In-universe information
- Full name: Draco Lucius Malfoy
- Family: Lucius Malfoy (father); Narcissa Malfoy (mother)
- Spouse: Astoria Greengrass (deceased wife)
- Children: Scorpius Malfoy (son)
- Nationality: British
- House: Slytherin
- Born: 5 June 1980

Draco Malfoy is a fictional character and a major antagonist in J. K. Rowling's Harry Potter series. He is a student in Harry Potter's year belonging in the Slytherin house. He is frequently accompanied by his two cronies, Crabbe and Goyle, who act as henchmen. Draco is characterised as a cowardly bully who tricks and hurts people to get what he wants; he is also a cunning user of magic. He was played by Tom Felton in the Harry Potter film series, while Lox Pratt is set to portray him in the TV series adaptation.

The character has received a positive critical reception, and has inspired various fan-fiction and fan-art works and original fiction, including the Draco/Harry or Drarry slash fan-fiction subgenre where he is paired romantically or shipped by fans with Potter, the novel Alchemised which began as a fan-fiction called "Manacled" where he is shipped with Hermione Granger, and the gender-swap trend Malfoid which reimagines him as a girl who is shipped with Potter.

== Character development ==
Draco serves as a foil to the hero, Harry Potter, and is loosely based on bullies Rowling encountered during her school days. Harry first encounters Draco's snobbish bigotry after their initial encounter at Madam Malkin's. Rowling uses the Malfoys to introduce themes of intolerance and bigotry into a setting where people are often judged solely by their blood lineage rather than their good character or accomplishments. Draco, adhering to his family's beliefs, thinks that Muggle-born witches and wizards, which he and other characters derogatorily describe by the epithet Mudbloods, should be denied a magical education. Harry's first impression that the Wizarding community is a "magical wonderland" is instantly shattered. Says Rowling, "[Harry] found out that many people in power in the wizarding world are just as corrupt and nasty as they are in our world."

Malfoy was originally named "Draco Spungen" in the earliest drafts of Philosopher's Stone. "Spungen" also appeared on her pre-canon class list, but it was crossed out and replaced with the surname "Spinks", while "Malfoy" was later added after the completion of the list. Philip Nel believes that Malfoy is derived from the French phrase mal foi, meaning "bad faith". In an article published in 2002, Nilsen and Nilsen argue that "Draco" has connotations with draconian, and that his name starts with "mal", a French prefix for "bad" or "evil".

== Appearances ==
=== Harry Potter and the Philosopher's Stone ===
Draco Malfoy makes his first appearance in the series when he and Harry meet while being fitted for school robes at Madam Malkin's, a clothing shop in Diagon Alley. Not realising that the boy in the store is Harry Potter—a child whose parents were murdered when he was one year old by the powerful dark wizard Lord Voldemort—Draco engages him in polite (relative to his later attitude towards Harry) conversation. Harry, however, is alienated by the arrogance of Draco, who asks whether the orphan's parents are "our kind" (pure-blood wizards). Draco then proclaims that "the other sort" (Muggle-borns) should not be allowed at Hogwarts School of Witchcraft and Wizardry, because "they've never been brought up to know our ways". The two boys part without introductions, but meet again on the Hogwarts Express. After Draco ridicules Ron Weasley's family, Harry rejects his offer of friendship, demonstrated by a handshake, and their mutual antagonism is born.

According to Rowling, Malfoy originally makes an effort to be Harry's friend because "it will be cool to turn up at the school being Harry Potter's friend, because Harry is so famous." However, Harry did not want Malfoy as a friend because he "has been so rude about Rubeus Hagrid and about Ron, who Harry likes so much".

At the first years' Sorting Ceremony, the Sorting Hat places him instantly into Slytherin, the house that has developed all of the bad wizards, where he becomes an instant favourite of Potions teacher and Slytherin Head of House, Severus Snape, an apparent follower of Lord Voldemort. Draco attempts to get Harry expelled by falsely challenging him to a midnight duel and informing Argus Filch in advance of Harry's plans to be out of bed; Draco's attempt fails when Harry evades Filch and safely makes it back to his dormitory.

=== Harry Potter and the Chamber of Secrets ===
In Harry Potter and the Chamber of Secrets, Draco becomes the new Seeker for the Slytherin Quidditch team after his father, Lucius Malfoy, donates new, high-quality Nimbus 2001 broomsticks. When Hermione Granger comments that the Gryffindor players made the team through talent and not bribery, Draco responds by calling her a "Mudblood", a derogatory term for people of mixed magical and human ancestry. This provokes an immediate, violent response from Ron. Because of Draco's contempt for Muggle-borns, Harry, Ron, and Hermione suspect that Draco is the Heir of Slytherin, who has recently reopened the Chamber of Secrets. Harry and Ron disguise themselves as Crabbe and Goyle with Polyjuice Potion and infiltrate the Slytherin common room in an attempt to collect additional information, whereupon they realise that their initial suspicion about Draco is incorrect.

=== Harry Potter and the Prisoner of Azkaban ===
During Hagrid's debut as Care of Magical Creatures instructor in Harry Potter and the Prisoner of Azkaban, Buckbeak the hippogriff attacks Draco after he fails to observe proper protocol while approaching it and insults it. He exaggerates the extent of his injury, giving Slytherin a chance to postpone their Quidditch match against Gryffindor until later in the year and as an attempt to have Hagrid fired. Hermione punches Draco when he mocks Hagrid for crying over Buckbeak's death sentence. Draco, who implies that he is aware of how Sirius Black was supposedly involved in the deaths of Harry's parents, also taunts Harry about the impending threat of Black: "If it was me, I'd want revenge. I'd hunt him down myself."

=== Harry Potter and the Goblet of Fire ===
After Harry is unexpectedly chosen as a Triwizard Tournament champion in Harry Potter and the Goblet of Fire, Draco shows off a "Support Cedric Diggory" badge to Harry, then presses it to replace the phrase with "Potter Stinks." Draco also gives malicious and often false information about Harry and Hagrid to muckraking Daily Prophet journalist Rita Skeeter. When Draco attempts to curse Harry behind his back, the Defence Against the Dark Arts professor Alastor Moody (actually Barty Crouch, Jr in disguise via Polyjuice Potion) humiliates Draco by transforming him into a ferret and repeatedly slamming him against the ground as well as dropping him down Goyle's pants.

=== Harry Potter and the Order of the Phoenix ===
In Harry Potter and the Order of the Phoenix, Draco is named a Slytherin prefect along with Pansy Parkinson. He gets Harry and the Weasley twins banned from the Gryffindor Quidditch team when they attack him during a postmatch brawl after Draco insults their families following Gryffindor's win over Slytherin. He later joins Dolores Umbridge's Inquisitorial Squad, with whom he plays an important part in the exposure of Dumbledore's Army. As the D.A. flees the Room of Requirement, Draco earns Slytherin fifty points after catching Harry, and helps hold several members captive in Umbridge's office, letting them free only after Ginny Weasley performs her famous Bat Bogey Hex. After his father and other Death Eaters are captured and sentenced to Azkaban following the events at the Department of Mysteries, Draco twice attempts to get revenge on Harry, but Snape and Minerva McGonagall thwart his first effort, and while returning home on the Hogwarts Express, Draco, Crabbe, and Goyle are transformed into giant slugs by a barrage of hexes cast by several D.A. members coming to Harry's defence.

=== Harry Potter and the Half-Blood Prince ===
Draco is drawn into Death-Eaters' activities more directly in Harry Potter and the Half-Blood Prince. Because of Lucius' arrest and fall from Voldemort's favour, Narcissa Malfoy and Bellatrix Lestrange visit Snape at his home to discuss a dangerous task that Voldemort has assigned Draco. Narcissa, deeply worried that her son will be killed in his attempt to complete it, begs Snape to make an Unbreakable Vow to aid Draco with this task and protect him at all costs, and if Draco fails to complete the mission, he will complete it himself; he agrees.

Under the Invisibility Cloak, Harry, Ron, and Hermione follow Draco to Borgin and Burkes, a dark magic shop in Knockturn Alley. Draco threatens Mr. Borgin about repairing one item and keeping another safe for him. Draco shows Mr. Borgin something on his arm that Harry believes to be the Dark Mark, Voldemort's sign, though whether or not Harry is correct is never confirmed. (In the film version Draco Malfoy shows Dumbledore the Dark Mark on his arm.) On the Hogwarts Express, Harry invisibly spies on Draco and overhears him discussing Voldemort's task with several other Slytherins. Draco knows Harry is present and, once alone in the compartment, immobilises him and breaks his nose causing Harry to hate Draco even more. Harry is left stranded on the train until Nymphadora Tonks (Luna Lovegood in the film adaptation) rescues him. Harry spends much of the year trailing Draco's whereabouts on his Marauder's Map, but loses track of him once Draco enters the Room of Requirement. When Katie Bell is almost killed in Hogsmeade after handling a cursed necklace and Ron nearly dies by drinking poisoned mead, Harry suspects Draco is behind both attacks.

In this book, Draco is, for the first time since being introduced in the series, portrayed as having considerable initiative, ingenuity, and perseverance. However, unlike Harry, who always relies on his friends' support and help, Draco mostly works alone in the Room of Requirement, refusing to confide in or involve his own circle of friends, whom he treats more as underlings. This, and the realisation of what he is ultimately expected to do, nearly drives him to a nervous breakdown. When Harry walks in on Malfoy crying in Moaning Myrtle's bathroom, Draco attempts to cast the Cruciatus Curse. Harry is faster to the draw with an obscure Sectumsempra spell that he learned from the mysterious Half-Blood Prince's book. The spell cuts deep gashes into Malfoy's face and chest, resulting in severe blood loss. Snape, alerted by Myrtle's screams, swiftly arrives and heals Draco's cuts, then takes him to the hospital wing.

Near the conclusion, Draco ambushes and disarms a gravely weakened Dumbledore at the Astronomy Tower. After Draco disarms him, Dumbledore calmly reasons with the frightened teenager and persuades him to reveal how he was, according to Voldemort's orders, to kill the headmaster through the cursed necklace and the poisoned mead. Malfoy reveals that he mended the broken Vanishing Cabinet in the Room of Requirement to act as a portal enabling Death Eaters to enter Hogwarts. Draco is hesitant to kill Dumbledore and he eventually lowers his wand. Snape arrives, dispatches Dumbledore himself and then flees Hogwarts with Draco in tow. As revealed during his confrontation with Dumbledore, Draco was an insecure boy incapable of committing cold-blooded murder and was forced to do Voldemort's bidding under the threat of his and his parents' deaths. Harry, who was horrified by the result of his duel with Draco in the bathroom incident, feels "the tiniest drop of pity mingled with his dislike" for his old rival.

During an interview in 2005, Rowling revealed that she enjoyed writing Draco in this book, and that the character "did a lot of growing up" as well.

=== Harry Potter and the Deathly Hallows ===
The Malfoys remain reluctant followers of Voldemort, who now uses their home as his headquarters; Draco passes out after witnessing Voldemort murder Muggle Studies professor Charity Burbage. Harry experiences occasional and disturbing visions of Draco being forced into performing Voldemort's bidding and feels "sickened... by the use to which Draco was now being put by Voldemort." When Harry, Ron, and Hermione are captured and taken to Malfoy Manor, Draco is asked to identify them, and though they are clearly recognisable, he only ambiguously replies "It might be." During the successful escape from Malfoy Manor headed by Dobby, Harry overpowers Draco and captures his wand.

When Harry, Ron, and Hermione seek Ravenclaw's diadem in the Room of Requirement, Draco, along with Crabbe and Goyle (Blaise Zabini in film version rather than Crabbe), attempts to capture Harry alive. However, Crabbe (Goyle in film version) defies Draco's orders and attempts to kill the trio by casting the deadly Fiendfyre; unable to control the spell, he dies in the blaze while the trio rescue Draco and Goyle (Zabini in film version). Draco, despite his often condescending and belittling attitude toward Crabbe and Goyle (as well as his other underlings), grieves for his lost friend. During the Battle of Hogwarts, Draco is seen pleading with a Death Eater who seems intent on killing him. He is once again saved by Harry and Ron, the latter of whom punches Draco in the face under the invisibility cloak for attempting to appease the Death Eater.

At about this time, it is revealed through the Pensieve that Dumbledore had known he was dying after being cursed by Voldemort's ring. However, to spare Draco's soul from being forever tainted by committing murder, Dumbledore pre-arranged his own death with Snape. Voldemort intended Draco to die in the attempt to kill Dumbledore so that Lucius would be punished for his failure to retrieve the prophecy from the Ministry of Magic.

After Harry is struck by the Avada Kedavra curse, Voldemort orders Narcissa to verify that Harry is actually dead. She detects his heartbeat, but she lies to Voldemort, knowing that she will be allowed to search for her son if the Death Eaters return to Hogwarts "as part of the conquering army." Although Draco does not directly take part in Harry's final confrontation with Voldemort, as he and his parents flee the battle for their personal safety, he influences its outcome; a plot twist reveals that Draco had unwittingly become the Elder Wand's master when he disarmed Dumbledore, even though Draco never actually possessed the wand. The wand's allegiance passes to whoever defeats its owner, so Harry, having taken Draco's wand at Malfoy Manor, became its new master; this prevents Voldemort from using its full power. In the end, it is Narcissa's lie to Voldemort concerning Harry's death that enables the Malfoys to narrowly avoid imprisonment in Azkaban.

==== Epilogue ====
In the epilogue, Draco marries Astoria Greengrass and has a son, Scorpius Malfoy. Draco's hairline has receded, making his face look even more pointed. Though they are not friends, Malfoy has somewhat decreased his animosity toward Harry, and, upon seeing them at King's Cross station, gives a brief and curt nod to Harry, Ron, Hermione and Ginny.

=== Harry Potter and the Cursed Child ===
In the play Harry Potter and the Cursed Child, Draco appears with his son Scorpius Hyperion Malfoy, who became best friends with Harry's second son Albus Severus Potter. It was revealed that during the fourth year of Scorpius's time in Hogwarts that Draco became widowed, as his wife Astoria Malfoy (née Greengrass) died due to an inherited blood curse, which could shorten her lifespan and prevent her from growing into old age.

The play also explores some of Draco's later life after the second wizarding war and prior to the events of the play. Due to his harrowing experiences during his time with the Death Eaters and his remorse over his crimes as a Death Eater, Draco had realised the error in his ways and thus abandoned the old pure-blood beliefs he was raised to believe in. This notably caused friction between him and his parents (who maintained these beliefs despite having defected from Voldemort). As he grew into adulthood, Draco fell in love with fellow Slytherin Astoria Greengrass, who also witnessed the carnage and horrors which the war and the old beliefs brought about (though lesser than Draco). This romance and eventual marriage would disappoint Draco's parents further given that they expected a more suitable candidate from one of the wizarding world's oldest pure-blood families and also an individual who had the embodiment of the old pure-blood beliefs. Despite having lost the favour of his parents, he still inherits the massive fortune of the Malfoy family, which made him independently wealthy and having no need to work. The inheritance also included his father's collection of Dark Arts artefacts.

After he married, Draco initially contemplated letting the Malfoy bloodline end with him to allow Astoria to live longer (much to Lucius's disappointment), as he was aware of Astoria's family blood curse and that childbirth would weaken her further. Astoria, however, dissuaded him from doing so as she wanted a child not for the pure-blood beliefs, but for him so that he will not be alone should she die some day, which culminated in the birth of Draco's first and only child Scorpius. Draco had once considered the birth of his son as the greatest day of his life, even though Scorpius's birth had further weakened Astoria's health and eventually caused her to die fourteen years later.

Draco was strict in Scorpius's upbringing and taught him to not believe in the old pure-blood beliefs and instead raised him to become a better child than Draco was in his own childhood, and was willing to allow his son to be punished for breaking school rules. He was also supportive of Scorpius's decision to befriend Harry's son Albus Severus, even though he and Harry had a history of animosity during their schooling years. Draco even trusted Albus to help Scorpius to heal him of his pain over losing his mother, and he valued his son's friendship to the point that he personally went to the Potter house to confront Harry, who tried to separate the two best friends. Despite having become more civil with his old enemies from the past, Draco remained apathetic and full of mockery towards them, including how he continued to mock Harry and his friends and sending a cold reply letter to Ginny's request to invite Scorpius to stay in the Potter house. These feelings only began to dissipate gradually as they became united by their common interest to save their sons. He was also revealed to be constantly envious of how Harry had true friends like Ron and Hermione (the latter whom became Minister for Magic) during his schooling years while he had only Crabbe and Goyle, who did not amount to being true friends for Draco.

During the events of the play, Draco slowly made amends with Harry and his friends as they all embarked on a journey to save their sons from Voldemort's daughter Delphini, demonstrating his slow, but gradual acknowledgement of Harry as a friend and his outright denouncement of his Death Eater past.

== Portrayal ==
=== Film portrayal ===
Tom Felton played Draco Malfoy in all of the Harry Potter films. Prior to landing the part of Malfoy, Felton auditioned to play Harry and Ron.

Felton contributed to premieres, articles and interviews, and received the Disney Channel's Kids Awards for Best DVD Harry Potter and the Chamber of Secrets on 22 September 2003 with Hermione Granger actress, Emma Watson. He also won the MTV Movie Award for Best Villain for his portrayal as Malfoy in the 2010 MTV Movie Awards and the 2011 MTV Movie Awards.

Malfoy grew into one of the series' most popular characters due to Felton's performances, and Felton quickly became synonymous with the character to many female fans, much to Rowling's dismay.

"I'm trying to clearly distinguish between Tom Felton, who is a good-looking young boy, and Draco, who, whatever he looks like, is not a nice man. It's a romantic, but unhealthy, and unfortunately all too common delusion of girls ... it actually worried me a little bit, to see young girls swearing undying devotion to this really imperfect character ... I mean, I understand the psychology of it, but it is pretty unhealthy."

Rowling has also noted that Malfoy "is certainly stylish in the film".

=== Theatre portrayal ===
In the theatre play Harry Potter and the Cursed Child Draco was portrayed by Alex Price and later by James Howard. Beginning in 2025, Tom Felton began playing the role, reprising it from the film series. In the theatre play Draco has a style like his father's, such as his long hair. Draco was married to Astoria Greengrass, who had died, and has a son named Scorpius.

== Characterisation ==
=== Outward appearance ===
Draco is described as a tall, slender boy with a pale, pointed face, sleek blond hair, and ice grey eyes.

=== Personality ===
Draco is the prototypical spoiled, rich brat; he believes that his family's wealth and social position gives him the right to bully those poorer than himself, such as Ron Weasley. He also insults Hermione Granger's Muggle-born status by referring to her as a "Mudblood", a term that, as stated by Hagrid, is one not used in civilised conversations. As Rowling explained in 1999, "He's a bigot and he's a bully, and as I say, in the most refined sense, he knows exactly what will hurt people".

In a July 2005 interview, Rowling added that Draco, unlike Harry, never feels remorse for his actions: "I thought of Draco as someone who is very capable of compartmentalising his life and his emotions, and always has done. So he's shut down his pity, enabling him to bully effectively. He's shut down compassion— how else would you become a Death Eater?"

Draco, as well as Dudley Dursley, was indoctrinated with his parents' beliefs. Rowling commented that "The moment Draco got what he thought he wanted, to become a Death Eater, and given a mission by Lord Voldemort, as he did in Harry Potter and the Half-Blood Prince, reality finally hit him" because his dream was "so very different". Rowling also stated that there was a real moral cowardice in Draco, but that he was not wholly bad.

Having gone through the horrors of the second wizarding war as a Death Eater, Draco abandoned the pure-blood beliefs he was originally devoted to and grew to become a better person than he was in his youth, becoming more tolerant and accepting of the non-pure-bloods of the wizarding world. He also made sure to discipline his son Scorpius to be a better child than he himself was in his youth, which made Scorpius to show kindness and become friends with Harry's son Albus Severus, as evidence of his reformation.

=== Magical abilities and skills ===
During the series, Draco is portrayed as a cunning, competent young wizard. In his second year, he successfully performed the Tarantallegra curse against Harry, a curse used by Death Eater Antonin Dolohov in book 5, and also successfully cast the Serpensortia spell in the same scene, conjuring a serpent from his wand just as Voldemort would later do against Dumbledore in book 5, and Snape against McGonagall in the final book. His character further develops in the sixth book, in which he is among very few students able to reach the required level to take Advanced Potions. Draco also proved capable at Occlumency, which he learned from his Aunt Bellatrix. Rowling recalled a discussion with her editor about Draco having mastered Occlumency while Harry could not. The author said that this is due to Draco being someone "very capable of compartmentalising his life and his emotions". Draco's wand is 10 inches precisely, made of hawthorn with a unicorn hair core, and which Ollivander states is "reasonably springy".

When asked what shape Draco's Patronus Charm is, Rowling replied that, at least by the end of the sixth book, Draco was not capable of producing a Patronus, as it is not magic routinely taught at Hogwarts.

== Reception ==
In a 2003 interview, Rowling noted that boys liked to dress up as Malfoy a lot more than Harry, and that people were "getting far too fond of Draco", which she found "a little bit worrying". In the same interview, Stephen Fry noted that just as Harry met Malfoy, he found out that there is also racism in the wizarding world and that many characters in power can be "as nasty and corrupt as in our world".

== In popular culture ==
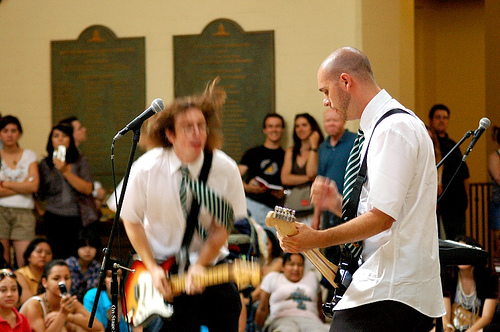
Draco and the Malfoys during a performance at Los Angeles Public Library in July, 2006.

Wizard-rock band Draco and the Malfoys' lyrics are inspired by the Harry Potter books but from Draco Malfoy's point of view. As well as Harry and the Potters, the members of Draco and the Malfoys dress themselves as Hogwarts students, in this case in Slytherin-themed costumes. The band is one of about 750 bands of young musicians playing music inspired by the Harry Potter series.

Draco is parodied as Jerko Phoenix in the series Wizards of Waverly Place, during the episodes "Wizard School Part 1" and "Wizard School Part 2", in which Alex and Justin Russo go to a wizarding school named Wiz-tech, where everyone wears yellow and black robes, and glasses reminiscent of Harry Potter. Draco also appears as Sacco (played by Shane Lyons) in the Harry Bladder sketches in All That, in which Harry Bladder and other students often encounter Sacco's mischief-making. In the stage production Harry Potter and the Obnoxious Voice, Malfoy is seen interacting with Hagrid and a dementor. Draco was also parodied in a Big Bite sketch, where he was known as Mailboy (with his father Lucius being parodied as Mailman). In Neil Cicierega's Potter Puppet Pals, Draco stars in the episode "Draco Puppet". He is different from all the other characters, simplistically made out of paper and is a smaller puppet, held and voiced by the Harry puppet. Harry created him in order to torture him, and after the puppet "annoys" Harry, he does a series of strange things to the paper Draco and eventually burns it on a stove. In A Very Potter Musical Draco is played by actress Lauren Lopez. He has a very obvious crush on Hermione and spends a great deal of time posing and rolling around on the floor.

=== "Malfoid" trend ===
A fan art depicting Malfoid, a gender-swap version of Draco Malfoy.

In fan fiction and fan art, characters are often subjected to "Rule 63" or gender-swap, in which historically male or female characters are depicted as the opposite gender. In the Harry Potter fandom, such fan works often include a female Draco Malfoy, sometimes paired with a female Harry or one that remains male. Stories in which Draco Malfoy is female, either born a girl or turned into one by magic, appeared in Harry Potter fan fiction from the early 2000s, and in 2013 fans set up a FanFiction.Net community for gender-swapped Harry Potter stories. The terms used in this early era were variations of Fem!Draco or Fem!Malfoy. In January 2018, Japanese DeviantArt and Twitter user Jean "TheMightFenek" Hayashi drew a gender-swapped Draco Malfoy as a tsundere girl, Dracia Malfoy, in being shipped with Harry. In Taiwan, users of the C_Chat board on PTT began a collaborative project around a female Draco in June 2020, writing stories and drawing scenes that followed the plots of the seven books. In South Korea, an amateur web novel with a female Draco, 악역영애 말포이 (lit. "Villainess Malfoy"), was published free of charge in 110 instalments and completed around 2021.

This variation of the Drarry (Draco/Harry) ship with a female Malfoy and a male Harry went newly viral in September 2026, with a wave of anime and manga-influenced fan art of a gender-swapped tsundere version of Draco, following an artwork posted on X by REDTEN (@redteneri). Swiftly known as "Malfoid" (a combination of Malfoy and the pejorative internet slang for women foid) or less popularly as "Galfoy" (a combination of Malfoy and gal), and properly named Dracaena, Draconia, Dracina, or the earlier Dracia Malfoy, this version of the gender-swapped character began trending on X and other social media platforms, consisting of hundreds of thousands of pieces of fan-art, fan-fiction, Harry Potter rewrites, fan films, and dating sim video games about the Potter/Malfoid ship, both from human-made and artificial intelligence-produced sources. The trend has been positively compared to the Bowsette and Petra Parker trends. One such Potter/Malfoid-centric Harry Potter rewrite, Harry Potter and the Sorcerer’s Tsundere by GuardBro, was removed from Royal Road in October 2026 following the site's copyright policy, due to excessive reused original text with minimal changes. Soichiro Yamamoto, Bkub Okawa, and Shun Saeki also drew fan-art of Malfoid/Galfoy. On October 27, 2026, the United States Department of Education posted an AI-generated photo of Malfoid with the caption "There’s Magic in Learning!".
