= Malfoid =

Fan-made version of Harry Potter's Draco Malfoy

- Based on: Draco Malfoy by J. K. Rowling

In-universe information
- Full name: Dracaena Malfoy, Draconia Malfoy, Dracia Malfoy etc.
- Nationality: British

Malfoid, also known as Galfoy, is a fan-made trend of depicting a gender-bend version of the Harry Potter franchise character Draco Malfoy. Properly named in many fan works as Dracaena, Dracia or Draconia Malfoy, she is usually drawn in an anime style with Draco's platinum-blonde hair and Slytherin uniform, and given a tsundere personality: she mocks Harry Potter while secretly being in love with him.

Female versions of Draco had appeared in fan fiction since the early 2000s, and in several fan art since the 2010s, but this latest version of the gender-swapped character became an Internet meme in late September 2026, when anime-style drawings of her spread on X and then to Reddit and other fan communities. The trend produced comics, fan fiction, AI-generated videos and a fan-made dating sim, drew contributions from professional manga artists, and attracted attention in Japan, South Korea and Taiwan. The term "Malfoid" has drawn criticism because it combines Malfoy with "foid", a derogatory term for women used in incel communities. It was also used during the 2026 United States elections period as a means to promote far-right views.

== Etymology ==
The term "Malfoid" is a portmanteau of Malfoy and "foid", short for "femoid", a derogatory term for women used in incel communities. According to Tuổi Trẻ, the term appears to be used in the fan-art trend mainly as a pun on Malfoy's surname, and the art does not play on its derogatory meaning; Indiatimes reported that many of those posting the art treated it as a pun on the surname, while others objected to the word choice. Spanish-language media have called the character "Malfoy Girl".

== Background ==
Stories in which Draco Malfoy is female, either born a girl or turned into one by magic, appeared in Harry Potter fan fiction from the early 2000s, and in 2013 fans set up a FanFiction.Net community for gender-swapped Harry Potter stories. The terms used in this early era were variations of Fem!Draco or Fem!Malfoy. In Taiwan, users of the C_Chat board on PTT began a collaborative project around a female Draco in June 2020, writing stories and drawing scenes that followed the plots of the seven books. In South Korea, an amateur web novel with a female Draco, 악역영애 말포이 (lit. 'Villainess Malfoy'), was published free of charge in 110 instalments and completed about five years before the 2026 trend. Drawings posted on X in March 2024 by the artist Grizz (@grizz056), built around the idea "if Malfoy was a girl", are commonly cited as the inspiration of the 2026 trend.

The concept went viral in September 2026 following a post on X by RedTeneri, which was followed by hundreds of thousands of pieces of fan-art, fan-fiction, Harry Potter rewrites, fan films, and dating sim video games being produced about the character and ship, both from human-made and artificial intelligence-produced sources. On 22 September, REDTEN (@redteneri) posted an anime-style drawing of a female Draco taunting Harry about being one of the best students in the school; it received more than 89,000 likes in its first week and prompted other artists to draw their own versions. On 27 September, @spaz141 posted a drawing of the character and Hermione Granger competing for Harry's attention, which received more than 44,000 likes in three days. The drawings spread from X to Reddit and other Harry Potter fan communities within days. Among the fan works were comics, fan fiction and animations, some made with generative AI tools, including re-creations of scenes from the films with Harry and the female Draco as a couple; a fan-made visual novel, Malfoid Dating Sim: Pureblood & Prejudice; and the AI-animated series In Another Universe by the creator Foyege, which retells the story around Harry and a female Draco named Draconia. In October, an English-language post on X pointing to the Korean web novel was viewed more than 12 million times.

The manga artists Soichiro Yamamoto, Bkub Okawa, and Shun Saeki were noted for drawing fan-art of Malfoid. A Malfoid-centric Harry Potter rewrite, Harry Potter and the Sorcerer's Tsundere by GuardBro, was removed from Royal Road following the site's copyright policy, due to excessive reused original text with minimal changes.

== Reception ==
Carl Martin Agustin of Lifestyle.INQ wrote that, while the upcoming HBO television series faced criticism over its casting and over J. K. Rowling's views on transgender people, fan art of a female Draco seemed "to be the one thing fans are happily agreeing upon", and that pairing Draco with Harry gave his betrayal and later redemption "more depth and significance". Tuổi Trẻ attributed the trend's spread partly to how closely Draco's wealth, arrogance and pride in his lineage match the "rich young lady" and villainess archetypes of manga and anime, and wrote that the 2026 trend did not create a new idea but let an old one reach a wider audience through social media, adding to interest in the franchise's characters ahead of the HBO series in December 2026. Ian Dean of Creative Bloq called Foyege's AI series "weird to watch" but "oddly compelling", describing such videos as "a new, professionalised aspect of fan fiction" while raising unresolved questions about copyright and AI training data.

In early October, the artist Yunayu posted a drawing of the female Draco on Bluesky and received hostile replies arguing that any new Harry Potter content kept attention on Rowling and indirectly was supporting her views, on top of objections to the "foid" part of the trend's name. Yunayu deleted the drawing and apologised, saying the wider controversies had been unknown to them when they drew it, and on 6 October reposted it on X, where the response was mostly supportive.

=== Usage by the political right ===
Steffi Cao of Slate criticized the alt-right for co-opting this meme, describing it as an attempt to reframe queer, same-sex pairings through a heteronormative lens. Michaela Makush of Wired noted that blood purity, which the original source material portrays as a form of prejudice that ought to be overcome, is instead romanticized and aestheticized; consequently, "Malfoid" has "transformed into an icon embodying right-wing aesthetics on Telegram and within far-right channels." On October 27, 2026, the United States Department of Education posted a Malfoid meme on X. This meme was used as right-wing propaganda during the 2026 United States elections.

On November 2, 2026, BlazeTV posted an image of Anakin Skywalker with his arm around Malfoid's shoulder as a thumbnail for a YouTube video.

== See also ==
- List of Internet phenomena
- Drarry – Community of fans of the Harry Potter books and films
- Bowsette – Fan-made version of Nintendo's Bowser
- Rule 63 – Technique in fiction
