= Fate/Apocrypha (TV series) =

2017 Japanese anime television series

- Blu-ray cover art featuring eight characters. Clockwise from top left: Sieg, Vlad III, Jeanne d'Arc, Chiron, Frankenstein's monster, Siegfried (center), Jack the Ripper, Astolfo, and Avicebron.
- Type: TV series
- Genre: Historical drama
- Based on: Fate/Apocrypha by Yūichirō Higashide
- Directed by: Yoshiyuki Asai
- Series composition: Yūichirō Higashide
- Character designer: Yūkei Yamada
- Music by: Masaru Yokoyama
- Voices of: Natsuki Hanae; Maaya Sakamoto; Rumi Ōkubo; Kenji Nomura; Miyuki Sawashiro; Kōki Uchiyama
- Opening themes: "Eiyū: Unmei no Uta" (Japanese: 英雄 運命の詩; "Heroes: Song of Fate") by Egoist; "Ash" by LiSA
- Ending themes: "Désir" (Desire) by Garnidelia; "Koe" by Asca
- No. of episodes: 25

Production
- Art director: Kazuhiro Inoue
- Sound director: Miwa Iwanami
- Cinematographer: Masaharu Okazaki
- Color designers: Takahiro Motegi; Makiko Doi
- CG director: Hiroshi Nakajima
- Editor: Ayumu Takahashi
- Animation producer: Yoshio Fujita
- Studio: A-1 Pictures
- Producers: Shizuka Kurosaki; Yoshiyuki Shiotani; Tomoyuki Owada
- Production companies: Aniplex; Type-Moon; Tokyo MX; BS11

Original release
- Networks: Tokyo MX, BS11, GTV, GYT, MBS
- Release: July 2 – December 30, 2017

Fate/Apocrypha is a 2017 Japanese anime television series produced by A-1 Pictures and directed by Yoshiyuki Asai. An adaptation of the light novel series of the same name written by Yūichirō Higashide, it is part of the Fate franchise. The 25-episode series aired in Japan from July 2 to December 30, 2017.

Set in an alternate world to Fate/stay night, the series depicts a conflict in Romania between two groups of mages, each commanding seven summoned historical or legendary figures called Servants, over possession of the wish-granting Holy Grail. The struggle increasingly centers on Sieg, an artificial human seeking freedom, and the attempt of another participant to use the Grail to grant immortality to all humanity.

The series received mixed to positive reviews, with praise for its animation and ensemble cast and criticism of its crowded narrative and characterization of Sieg. It won Best TV Anime at the 2017 Newtype Anime Awards.

== Plot ==
During the Second World War, the Greater Grail, a magical artifact capable of granting wishes, is stolen from Fuyuki, Japan, and taken to Romania. Decades later, the Yggdmillennia family of mages announces that it possesses the Grail and is breaking away from the Mage's Association. The Association responds by initiating a Great Holy Grail War between seven Masters of Black, representing Yggdmillennia, and seven Masters of Red, aligned with the Association. Each Master summons a Servant, a recreated figure from history, legend or literature. Joan of Arc is summoned as a neutral Ruler to oversee the conflict.

The Black Servants include Astolfo, Avicebron, Chiron, Frankenstein's monster, Jack the Ripper, Siegfried and Vlad III. The Red Servants include Achilles, Atalanta, Karna, Mordred, Semiramis, Spartacus and William Shakespeare. Mordred and her Master, Kairi Shishigō, operate independently of the Red faction's leadership. Meanwhile, Semiramis creates the Hanging Gardens of Babylon, a flying fortress from which the Red faction can attack Yggdmillennia.

A homunculus manufactured by Yggdmillennia as a source of magical energy escapes confinement with Astolfo's help. When the homunculus is fatally injured, Siegfried sacrifices himself and gives him his heart. The survivor takes the name Sieg, gains the ability to transform temporarily into Siegfried and begins helping other homunculi escape. Joan protects Sieg and becomes increasingly attached to him. During the fighting, Frankenstein's monster sacrifices herself in an attack on Mordred, while the Red faction captures the Greater Grail.

The Red faction is secretly controlled by Shirō Kotomine, revealed to be Amakusa Shirō Tokisada, a Ruler Servant from an earlier Grail War. He intends to use the Grail to free humanity from death by giving human souls an immortal existence without physical bodies. His plan causes several participants from opposing factions to cooperate against him. Avicebron defects to Shirō's side and sacrifices his own Master to create a giant golem that begins transforming the surrounding land into Eden, but the golem is destroyed by the opposing Servants. Sieg becomes Astolfo's new Master after Astolfo's previous Master is killed.

Jack the Ripper, revealed as a collective manifestation of the spirits of abused and murdered children, draws Sieg, Joan and Atalanta into an illusory Victorian London. Joan releases the spirits, angering Atalanta, who wants to protect them. In preparation for an assault on the Hanging Gardens, the surviving opponents of Shirō form an alliance. During the final battles, Chiron and Achilles fight each other, Sieg defeats Karna, and Mordred and Shishigō defeat Semiramis but suffer fatal injuries. Joan confronts Shirō after overcoming an illusion created by Shakespeare and sacrifices herself in an attempt to stop his plan.

Sieg ultimately defeats Shirō, but the Grail has already been activated. To prevent its power from transforming humanity, Sieg becomes the dragon Fafnir and carries it to another plane of existence. Astolfo survives and returns to the human world. Joan eventually reaches Sieg in the other realm, where they are reunited.

== Production ==
The series adapts Higashide's five-volume light novel sequence, published between 2012 and 2014, itself developed from concepts for an abandoned Fate video game. The anime was directed by Yoshiyuki Asai at A-1 Pictures, with scripts by Higashide, character designs by Yūkei Yamada and music by Masaru Yokoyama.

The first opening theme, used for episodes 1–12, is "Eiyū: Unmei no Uta" by Egoist, and the corresponding ending theme is "Désir" by Garnidelia. Episodes 13–24 use "Ash" by LiSA as the opening and "Koe" by Asca as the ending. "Désir" returns for the final episode.

== Release and distribution ==
Fate/Apocrypha premiered on July 2, 2017, on Tokyo MX and also aired on BS11, Gunma TV, Tochigi TV and MBS. Its 25 episodes concluded on December 30, 2017.

The series streamed on Netflix in Japan. The first twelve episodes became available on Netflix outside Japan on November 7, 2017. Aniplex of America released the series in two Blu-ray sets on November 20, 2018, and February 12, 2019, including an English dub. Madman Entertainment acquired home-video rights in Australia and New Zealand, and MVM Entertainment did so in the United Kingdom and Ireland.

== Episodes ==
No.	Title	Original air date
1	"Apocrypha: The Great Holy Grail War"; Transliteration: "Gaiten: Seihai Taisen" (Japanese: 外典:聖杯大戦)	July 2, 2017
Kairi Sisigou is summoned to the Clock Tower by Rocco Belfeban, who informs him that Darnic Prestone Yggdmillennia has gone rogue, claiming he possesses the Holy Grail that was stolen from Fuyuki during the Third Grail War and announcing his intentions to form a new Mage Association in direct conflict with the Clock Tower. Knowing that the Yggdmillennia group has already summoned Servants to fight for them, the Clock Tower has decided to activate an emergency system in the Greater Grail, triggering a Great Holy Grail War. Seven Masters of Red representing the Clock Tower will be pitted against seven Masters of Black representing Yggdmillennia in a team battle instead of the free-for-all of a regular Holy Grail War. Sisigou accepts the offer to become a Master of Red and receives a piece of the Round Table as his catalyst. Meanwhile, in Romania, Darnic is aware of the Clock Tower's plans and begins building an army of golems with the help of Avicebron, while his comrades summoned their Servants. Sisigou then arrives in Romania and performs the summoning ritual, calling forth Mordred. Elsewhere, a girl claiming to be Jeanne d'Arc appears.
2	"The Appearance of the Saints"; Transliteration: "Seijo no Shuttatsu" (Japanese: 聖女の出立)	July 9, 2017
Jeanne d'Arc is summoned to Romania as a Ruler-class servant, tasked with ensuring that the Holy Grail War proceeds as intended. After having a brief flashback of being burned at the stake, Jeanne leaves for the battlefield. Meanwhile, the Black Faction servants are revealed to be Astolfo, Chiron, Frankenstein's monster, Siegfried, Avicebron, Vlad Tepes III, and Jack the Ripper. Sisigou introduces himself to Mordred, and finds out she desires the Grail in order to get the chance to draw Caliburn, therefore proving her worthiness to succeed her father, King Arthur. The two then head to the local church to meet Shiro Kotomine, a priest and the de facto leader of the Red Faction. Shiro reveals his servant is Semiramis, but Sisigou refuses to divulge Mordred's identity and leaves, intending to act on his own since neither he nor Mordred trust Shiro. Shakespeare then arrives and informs Shiro that Spartacus has defied orders and has moved to attack the Yggdmillenia castle on his own. That night, Sisigou and Mordred encounter a Yggdmillenia patrol and eliminate it, with Sisigou and Mordred mutually impressed with each others' combat abilities. At the church, Shiro orders Karna to assassinate Jeanne, fearing that she will interfere with his plans.
3	"First Step of Fate"; Transliteration: "Arukidasu Unmei" (Japanese: 歩き出す運命)	July 16, 2017
Karna attacks Jeanne as she is traveling to Trifas, but Siegfried and Gordes intervene. Both Karna and Siegfried battle each other to a stalemate, and Karna voluntarily withdraws. During the battle, Siegfried has a flashback to his past and death and wonders what he truly wishes for. Gordes then tries to convince Jeanne to side with the Black Faction, but she reminds him that as the Ruler class, she must remain neutral. At the castle, one of the homunculi awakens and escapes from his tube. Astolfo encounters the Homunculus and takes him to Chiron for treatment. Chiron heals the Homunculus, but warns him that he only has three years left to live. Caules talks to Frankenstein's monster, and determines that her wish is to have a being similar to her that she can live with. Caules reveals that his wish is to protect his sister Fiore. Chiron tells Fiore that his wish is to regain his immortality, while Fiore admits that she simply wants to the Grail to heal her legs so that she can walk without having to sacrifice her magical ability. Sisigou and Mordred are resting in a nearby mausoleum when Shiro warns them that Spartacus is assaulting the castle. The Black Faction is aware of Spartacus' approach, and begin preparations to face him in battle.
4	"Price of Life, Redemption of Death"; Transliteration: "Nama no Daishō, Shi no Tsugunai" (Japanese: 生の代償、死の償い)	July 23, 2017
Spartacus continues his advance on the Yggdmillenia castle, with Achilles and Atalanta keeping a close eye on him. The Black Faction servants then engage Spartacus and are able to immobilize him, with Darnic planning to try and turn him to their side. Siegfried and Frankenstein's monster are sent to attack Achilles and Atalanta, but Achilles is easily able to hold them both off by himself. Believing that Siegried is prolonging the fight because he is enjoying the battle, Gordes impulsively uses a Command Spell to force Siegfried to use his Noble Phantasm Balmung, but is forced by Darnic to use a second Command Spell to cancel the order. Chiron then joins the battle, forcing Achilles and Atalanta to withdraw. During the confusion of the battle, Astolfo takes the chance to smuggle the Homunculus out of the castle, but they are spotted and Gordes and Siegfried are sent to catch them. Meanwhile, Jeanne is also in the forest investigating the aftermath of the battle, noting how the presence of the Red Masters is uncharacteristically weak and that something is wrong with this war. Gordes then catches the Homunculus and inadvertently kills him when he tries to defend himself. Siegried knocks out Gordes and removes his own heart to give to the Homunculus, saving his life. Before fading away, Siegried reveals that his greatest wish was to help somebody of his own volition rather than being told to, and he does not regret his sacrifice. Jeanne arrives and promises to Siegfried that she will protect the Homunculus.
5	"Will of Heaven"; Transliteration: "Ten no Koe" (Japanese: 天の声)	July 30, 2017
After having a dream about encountering a dragon, the Homunculus awakes to find Jeanne and Astolfo watching over him. The rest of the Black Faction then arrives and attempts to retrieve the Homunculus, but are forced to back down when Jeanne declares that he is under her protection. The Black Faction returns to their castle, with Astolfo being sent to the dungeon for the night as punishment. Caules reflects that Siegfried disobeyed Gordes due to poor communication between the two, and Gordes assuming Siegfried was merely an obedient familiar. Darnic then receives news that Jack the Ripper has gone rogue in Sighisoara, and sends Fiore and Chiron to investigate. Sisigou and Mordred also receive orders from the Mage Association to head to Sighisoara. Jeanne escorts the Homunculus, who decides to name himself "Sieg" in honor of Siegfried, and puts him in the care of a local farmer. She advises Sieg that he is now free to make his own choices on how to live before taking her leave. However, Jeanne knows from a prophetic vision that Sieg is doomed to die on the battlefield, and she resolves to fight to change his fate. Meanwhile, Shiro approaches the Red Masters, claiming that the Red Faction has won the war and asking for them to turn over their Command Spells to him.
6	"Knight of Rebellion"; Transliteration: "Hangyaku no Kishi" (Japanese: 叛逆の騎士)	August 6, 2017
In the past, it is revealed that Mordred led a rebellion against King Arthur due to Arthur's refusal to recognize her as her child or a worthy heir to the throne, resulting in Mordred's death at Arthur's hands. In the present, Sisigou and Mordred arrive in the town of Sighisoara to investigate a string of serial murders targeting mages. Inspecting the bodies, Sisigou notes that the victims' hearts are missing, suggesting that the murderer is a Servant who is harvesting the mages' life force. At the Yggmillenia castle, Darnic considers sacrificing the now-useless Gordes to be the heart for Avicebron's ultimate golem. Caules decides to leave on his own to follow Fiore, while Celenike wonders why Astolfo is so interested in Sieg. At the church, Semiramis completes the Hanging Gardens of Babylon, and Shiro decides it is time for the Red Faction to begin their offensive. Later that night, Sisigou uses himself as bait to lure out Jack the Ripper, and Mordred engages her. However, Chiron and Fiore intervene in the battle, forcing Jack the Ripper to retreat. Mordred engages Chiron in battle, where they are both able to wound each other. Sisigou battles Fiore and manages to corner her, firing a shotgun blast she cannot avoid.
7	"Where Freedom Lies"; Transliteration: "Jiyū no Arika" (Japanese: 自由の在処)	August 13, 2017
Fiore is saved when Caules blocks Sisigou's attack. However, Chiron warns them that he is at a disadvantage fighting Mordred, and they retreat. Sisigou and Mordred also leave, calling it a draw. Meanwhile, Jack the Ripper eats her last mage heart to recover from her wounds, and decides to head for Trifas to find more mages. Jeanne heads to the church to investigate the Red Faction, but finds that they have already left. Sieg has a discussion with his guardian about the true nature of freedom, and reflects on what he wants to do. Semiramis finally completes the Hanging Gardens of Babylon, which acts as a giant flying fortress to aid in their assault on Castle Yggdmillienia. Jeanne follows the Red Faction as they depart. As the Hanging Gardens approaches the castle, the Black Faction rallies their forces to defend against the Red Faction attack. Sieg decides to leave for the battlefield, finally having discovered his purpose.
8	"The Beginning of the War"; Transliteration: "Kaisen no Noroshi" (Japanese: 開戦の狼煙)	August 20, 2017
The Red Faction begins their assault on Castle Yggdmillenia, with Atalanta and Karna facing off against Vlad who manages to hold his own against the two Servants. Achilles encounters Chiron and reluctantly realizes that he must battle his old teacher. On the Hanging Gardens, Shiro decides to personally take part in the battle, stating that if God truly does not want him to succeed, then he will be defeated. However, if he succeeds, then that means God has blessed his desire to use the Grail to bring about world peace. Astolfo mounts his hippogryph and attacks the Hanging Gardens, with Semiramis activating the fortress' defenses. Jeanne arrives on the battlefield, but is surrounded by the Red Faction's minions. Sieg also arrives on the battlefield, helping a wounded homunculus and telling her that he intends to infiltrate the castle and free all of the other homunculi, just as how Astolfo and Siegfried did for him. Sisigou and Mordred arrive by car, with Mordred furious that they missed the beginning of the battle. Avicebron convinces Spartacus to join the Black Faction and releases him to fight. Frankenstein's Monster chases some Red Faction minions into the forest and encounters Shiro, who asks her to join the Red Faction instead.
9	"Hundreds of Flames and Hundreds of Flowers"; Transliteration: "Hyaku no Honō to Hyaku no Hana" (Japanese: 百の焔と百の華)	August 27, 2017
Darnic observes the Grail and reminisces how he stole it from Fuyuki. Outside, Shiro is able to battle Frankenstein's Monster to a standstill while Shakespeare observes. Astolfo attempts to assault the Hanging Gardens but is shot down by Semiramis' magic. Achilles begins to battle Chiron in earnest, demonstrating that he has learned skills that Chiron never taught him. Karna continues to battle Vlad while Atalanta is forced to fight Spartacus. She unleashes her Noble Phantasm on him, but he absorbs the attack and begins to mutate. In the castle, Sieg manages to free all of the homunculi and arrange for their escape. He then sees Astolfo falling from the sky and leaves to help. Astolfo survives the fall and encounters Mordred, who begins a battle with him. Jeanne senses Shiro's presence and decides to pursue him, despite Semiramis' best efforts to stop her. Warned of Jeanne's approach, Shiro retreats and has Shakespeare trap Frankenstein's Monster in an illusion. Frakenstein's Monster breaks out, but is traumatized from the experience, requiring Caules to use a Command Spell to calm her down. Shiro then instructs Atalanta to lure the heavily mutated Spartacus to Jeanne. Darnic then heads out to "conclude the battle." In a post credits scene, Mordred defeats Astolfo, but before she can finish him off, Sieg arrives and challenges Mordred.
10	"Scattered Flower"; Transliteration: "Hana to Chiru" (Japanese: 花と散る)	September 3, 2017
Sieg attempts to save Astolfo from Mordred but is easily defeated by her. Frankenstein's Monster then intervenes but is also easily defeated by Mordred. Sieg tries to attack Mordred again, and she responds by killing him. With no other choice, Frankenstein's Monster uses her Noble Phantasm and sacrifices herself in an attempt to kill Mordred, but she survives the blast. In the process, Sieg's body is struck by a bolt of lightning. Meanwhile, Jack the Ripper kills several homunculi to restore her energy. In his mind, Sieg meets Siegfried, who asks him what he wishes for. Sieg wishes to have the power to save even one person, and inherits Siegfried's power. Sieg is then resurrected in the form of Siegfried, and begins battling Mordred. Shiro observes the events and surmises that Sieg has been possessed by Siegfried's spirit, granting him Servant-level power, but such a transformation can only last for a few minutes. After realizing they are both at a stalemate, both Sieg and Mordred unleash their Noble Phantasms at each other, creating a massive explosion.
11	"Eternal Radiance"; Transliteration: "Eien no Kagayaki" (Japanese: 永遠の輝き)	September 10, 2017
Atalanta leads a heavily mutated Spartacus to Jeanne, forcing her to fight him. However, Spartacus' attention is drawn to the explosion caused by Sieg and Mordred's Noble Phantasms colliding. Sieg is weakened by the attack and reverts to his regular form, and Spartacus attacks Mordred before she can finish him off. Mordred cuts Spartacus in half, which triggers his regeneration again and making his body unstable. Mordred withdraws under Sisigou's orders. Karna and Vlad continue to battle each other to a stalemate until Karna is ordered to withdraw as well. Jeanne follows Spartacus and encounters Sieg and Astolfo just as Spartacus' body overloads and explodes. Jeanne is forced to use her Noble Phantasm to protect Sieg and Astolfo. Meanwhile, Shiro takes advantage of the distraction caused by the blast to steal the Greater Grail from the castle. Vlad, Chiron, and Avicebron board the Hanging Gardens and are met by Karna, Achilles, and Atalanta. Karna and Vlad clash again, but now that Vlad is no longer fighting on Romanian soil, his power is greatly weakened. Darnic them reminsices on how Vlad's wish is to erase the legend of Dracula from existence, and how Vlad warned him not to force him to use his true Noble Phantasm. Seeing that there is no way for Vlad to win against Karna in this situation, Darnic prepares his Command Spells.
12	"The Holy Man Returns Triumphant"; Transliteration: "Seijin no Gaisen" (Japanese: 聖人の凱旋)	September 17, 2017
Darnic uses his Command Spells to force Vlad to transform into his vampire form, and then merges his own soul with Vlad's to seize control of his body. Jeanne then arrives and realizes that the vampirized Darnic would destroy the world if he obtains the Grail. So she recruits Karna, Achilles, Atalanta, Avicebron, and Chiron to form a temporary truce to defeat Darnic. Meanwhile, back in the castle, Fiore takes charge in Darnic's absence, attempting to have what is left of the Black Faction forces regroup. In the Hanging Gardens, the combined might of the gathered heroes begins to gain the upper hand against Darnic, but the Red Faction servants are incapacitated when their mana is cut off. Darnic takes the opportunity to make a run for the Grail while Jeanne attempts to follow. Darnic then reaches a chapel where he encounters Shiro. Shiro easily destroys Darnic, pointing out how Darnic's vampirization makes him vulnerable to Shiro's holy weapons. Jeanne then catches up and is shocked to see Shiro, who she recognizes as the Ruler-class servant of the Fuyuki Grail War sixty years ago, Amakusa Shiro Tokisada. When Jeanne asks Shiro what he is planning, he replies that he wants to "save all of mankind".
12.5	"The Beginning of the Great Holy Grail War Arc"; Transliteration: "Seihai Taisen Kaimaku-hen" (Japanese: 聖杯大戦開幕編)	September 24, 2017
A recap of the first 12 episodes.
13	"The Last Master"; Transliteration: "Saigo no Masutā" (Japanese: 最後のマスター)	October 1, 2017
Sieg and Astolfo reunite and discover Sieg has Command Spells now, but are interrupted by Celenike. She uses her own Command Spells to force Astolfo to kill Sieg, but she herself is killed by Mordred before Astolfo can carry out the order. With Astolfo's master dead, Sieg makes a contract with Astolfo and becomes his new master. In the Hanging Gardens, Shiro tells Jeanne that he intends to use the Grail to bring salvation to humanity and will eliminate anybody in his way. Since Shiro possesses all of the Red Faction's Command Spells, Karna, Achilles, and Atalanta reluctantly stand down. Avicebron accepts Shiro's offer for surrender and joins his side, under the condition that Roche not be harmed. Jeanne and Chiron refuse to join Shiro, and are rescued when Mordred arrives and creates a distraction, revealing that she and Sisigou have also decided to oppose Shiro. Back in the castle, Fiore, Caules, and Gordes confront the rescued homunculi when Sieg intervenes, intending to negotiate with the Black Faction by leveraging his status as Astolfo's master. Fiore is then interrupted by a report from Chiron warning her of Avicebron's betrayal. Roche, unaware of Avicebron switching sides, meets him by the lake, bringing a special item he requested.
14	"Prayer of Salvation"; Transliteration: "Kyūsei no Inori" (Japanese: 救世の祈り)	October 8, 2017
As the Hanging Gardens fly away, Jeanne returns to the castle and asks Sieg whether he is truly ready to join the Grail War. Sieg reaffirms his choice, and Jeanne reluctantly accepts his status as a Master. Meanwhile, Avicebron uses Roche as the core for his Golem Keter Malkuth and activates it, intending to use it to bring salvation to mankind. Avicebron then leads the Golem to attack the castle. Jeanne, Sieg, Astolfo, Chiron, and Fiore attempt to mount a defense and Chiron kills Avicebron, but the Golem continues its attack. Jeanne realizes that the Golem is slowly converting the area around it into Eden, and if left alone long enough to complete its transformation, it will become unstoppable. On Chiron's suggestion, Jeanne summons Mordred, who agrees to assist them. As Jeanne, Chiron, and Astolfo distract the Golem, Sieg transforms into Siegfried and both he and Mordred strike the Golem with their Noble Phantasms simultaneously. The Golem is overwhelmed by the combined attack and is destroyed. Afterwards, Fiore meets with Sisigou and they agree to a temporary truce.
15	"Differing Paths"; Transliteration: "Michi wa Chigae do" (Japanese: 道は違えど)	October 15, 2017
Achilles, Atalanta, and Karna confront Shiro, who explains that their former masters are still alive and being held prisoner. The three Servants reluctantly agree to follow Shiro. Achilles reveals his wish is to live again as a hero, Atalanta wants all children in the world to be loved, and Karna simply wishes to battle Siegfried again. Shiro acknowledges their wishes and decides to tell them exactly how he plans to achieve his salvation of humanity. Back at the castle, Jeanne, Sisigou, and the remains of the Black Faction agree to work together to stop Shiro. Chiron privately warns Caules that Fiore's empathy may make her unfit to be the ruler of Yggdmillenia, but Caules promises to be there to help her. Jeanne gives Sisigou an extra Command Spell as payment for Mordred's assistance with Avicebron, and she gives Sieg two more Command Spells, warning him never to use the third Command Spell since nobody knows what will happen to him if it disappears. Later, Sisigou tells Mordred how his family was cursed, and his family line will die with him. In addition, his adopted daughter had also died due to the curse. Mordred assumes Sisigou will use the Grail to lift the curse, and he reveals to her that he is actually planning to steal the Grail from both the Red and Black factions while they are busy fighting each other. Gordes comes across the infirmary where the wounded homunculi are being treated, and begins to reflect on his past actions. Atalanta asks Shakespeare why he's helping Shiro, and he responds that he is interested in Shiro's struggle. Shiro stands in front of the Grail, promising to sacrifice everything to make his wish come true.
16	"Jack the Ripper"; Transliteration: "Jakku za Rippā" (Japanese: ジャック・ザ・リッパー)	October 22, 2017
In Trifas, Jack the Ripper tortures a mage until he agrees to tell her what she wants to hear. Satisfied, Jack the Ripper tears the mage's heart out. Meanwhile, Jeanne is still troubled by Sieg's participation in the war when she sees him collapse. Chiron performs an examination and reveals that Sieg's act of transforming into Siegfried is taking a toll on his body, and repeated use may eventually kill him. However, Sieg is not bothered by this news, as he is willing to sacrifice his life to protect others. Jeanne and Astolfo then meet with Fiore, who asks them to help track down Jack the Ripper, who has been indiscriminately killing mages, including ones belonging to the Yggdmillenia family. Jeanne, Astolfo, Chiron, and Caules head into Trifas to examine the bodies of Jack the Ripper's victims, and they realize that one of the victims knew how to bypass the castle's magical defenses. As the Servants rush back to the castle, Fiore is attacked by Jack the Ripper, and she is narrowly saved by intervention from Sieg, who distracts Jack the Ripper long enough for the others to arrive. Jack the Ripper is forced to retreat, and everybody agrees that she must be dealt with before they can make their move against Shiro.
17	"Träumerei"; Transliteration: "Toroimerai" (Japanese: トロイメライ)	October 29, 2017
Sieg and Jeanne head into Trifas to act as decoys in an effort to lure out Jack and Ripper and her master, Reika Rikudo. Fiore tells them that Reika was meant to be used as a sacrifice by Jack the Ripper's original master, but Jack the Ripper turned on him instead. Jeanne takes the opportunity to show Sieg around the town and teach him to interact with humans, and it is shown that she has started to develop feelings for him. In the Hanging Gardens, Achilles asks Shiro whether he has truly let go of his hatred against the people responsible for his death, and Shiro replies he threw his hatred away for the sake of his wish. This answer appears to satisfy Achilles, though Semiramis is wary of his motives. In Trifas, Jack the Ripper and Reika attempt to ambush Sieg and Jeanne, but are thwarted when Chiron ambushes them instead. As Jack the Ripper and Reika attempt to flee, Reika notices Atalanta aiming an arrow at Jack the Ripper and sacrifices herself by taking the hit instead. With her dying breath, Reika uses her remaining Command Spells to order Jack the Ripper to live on without her. The entire area is then engulfed in a mist and Sieg finds himself transported to Victorian London, where he encounters a younger version of Jack the Ripper.
18	"From Hell"; Transliteration: "Furomu Heru" (Japanese: フロム・ヘル)	November 5, 2017
Sieg, Jeanne, and Atalanta are transported into a nightmare version of Victorian London created by Jack the Ripper, where they learn that Jack the Ripper isn't an actual person, but instead the amalgamation of all of the spirits of the children who were victimized and killed during the Victorian era. Atalanta, remembering how she was abandoned by her birth parents before being adopted and wanting to create a world where children are loved, sides with the spirits and tries to protect them from Jeanne, who believes the only way to free the spirits is to destroy them. The spirits agree to let Jeanne destroy them, and she uses her power to purify them. Atalanta then attacks Jeanne, furious that she didn't try to save the children, but is chased off by Chiron and Astolfo. Sieg is left shaken after witnessing the cruelty humans are capable of, but Jeanne tries to reassure him by reminding him that humans are also capable of loving others. Shakespeare then addresses the audience (breaking the 4th wall), announcing that the story will now focus on the conflict between Jeanne and Shiro, and wondering what role Sieg will play in the battles to come.
19	"Dawn of the End"; Transliteration: "Owari no Asa" (Japanese: 終わりの朝)	November 12, 2017
Jeanne and the Yggdmillenia faction begin to plan for their assault on the Hanging Gardens, though the only way to access it would be by plane. Astolfo points out that his Noble Phantasm can protect them from the Garden's magical defenses, but it will only work on a moonless night. The next new moon is in three days, which risks the Hanging Gardens leaving Romanian airspace by then. Fiore is forced to make the choice between leaving immediately, ensuring heavy casualties, or waiting three days and potentially allowing Shiro to escape. She decides to wait three days but realizes that her kindness makes her unfit to be the leader of Yggdmillenia, so she transfers her magical crest to Caules. Meanwhile, Sieg and Astolfo visit Trifas and run into Mordred. Sieg, still troubled over what he saw in Jack the Ripper's illusion, asks Mordred whether humans are worth protecting or not. Mordred simply replies that there is no right or wrong choice, but Sieg remains troubled. Afterwards, both Jeanne and Shiro's factions prepare for the final battle.
19.5	"The Disturbance of the Great Holy Grail War Arc"; Transliteration: "Seihai Taisen Dōran-hen" (Japanese: 聖杯大戦動乱編)	November 18, 2017
A recap from episodes 13 to 19.
20	"Soar Through the Sky"; Transliteration: "Sora o Kakeru" (Japanese: 空を駆ける)	November 25, 2017
Jeanne, Sieg, Astolfo, Chiron, Fiore, and Caules depart to assault the Hanging Gardens. Jeanne and Chiron will draw the attention of the enemy Servants while Sieg and Astolfo dismantle the Hanging Gardens' defenses, allowing Fiore and Caules to board it. Meanwhile, Shiro prepares to enter the Grail to carry out the next step on his plan. Before doing so, though, he uses a Command Spell to order Shakespeare not to write his story as a tragedy. Semiramis then sees Jeanne's approach and begins organizing the defense of the Hanging Gardens. Achilles and Atalanta are sent out first, with Achilles engaging Chiron while Atalanta goes after Jeanne. Atalanta, still furious over Jeanne destroying Jack the Ripper's soul, decides to attack her directly in close combat. Achilles initially has the advantage over Chiron due to his chariot, but Chiron is able to disable the chariot and force Achilles to fight him on even terms. Chiron then asks why Achilles would follow Shiro, since his wish to save all of humanity is impossible. However, Achilles hints to Chiron that Shiro will use the Grail to rewrite reality itself to achieve his wish. Inside the Grail, Shiro resists the temptation to give in to his hate and despair, reminding himself that he had thrown away his emotions. He then reaches "Heaven's Feel" and meets the physical embodiment of the Grail, where he tells her that he wishes to materialize all of humanity's souls.
21	"Antares Snipe"; Transliteration: "Tenkatsu Issha" (Japanese: 天蠍一射)	December 2, 2017
Chiron and Achilles continue their battle against each other. Meanwhile, Sieg and Astolfo begin to attack the Hanging Garden's defenses. Astolfo, empowered by the new moon, uses one of his Noble Phantasms to negate Semiramis' magical attacks. Semiramis orders Karna to stop them, and Sieg resorts to transforming himself into Siegfried to hold him off. Astolfo uses the last of his energy to destroy the last of the Hanging Gardens' defenses. Semiramis arrives to finish him off, but she is interrupted when Modred arrives and engages her. Back outside, Achilles traps himself and Chiron in an altered reality where neither of them can use their Noble Phantasms and must rely on their own innate fighting ability. Both sides engage in hand-to-hand combat, where they are almost evenly matched, but Achilles ultimately ends up the victor. Mortally wounded, Chiron reveals that he had laid a trap for Achilles, striking his heel with an arrow and negating his immortality. Before passing away, Chiron makes one final request to Achilles to give one of his Noble Phantasms to one of the Black Servants. Nearby, Atalanta continues to attack Jeanne, resorting to transforming herself into a bestial form. Back on the Hanging Gardens, Astolfo regains consciousness and is met by Achilles, who decides to entrust something to Astolfo.
22	"Reunion and Farewell"; Transliteration: "Saikai to Betsuri" (Japanese: 再会と別離)	December 9, 2017
Jeanne and Atalanta continue to battle, with Jeanne barely able to hold her own against Atalanta's new bestial form. Achilles then intervenes, deciding to battle Atalanta to save her from the dark path she has chosen. Jeanne continues on to find Shiro. Meanwhile, Sieg's time limit on his transformation runs out, though Karna makes a request to him and Caules to rescue to the Red Masters, who are still being held hostage by Shiro. Caules adds a condition that if the Red Masters are saved, then Karna will spare Sieg if he cannot defeat him before his next transformation expires. Caules teleports the Red Masters away and Sieg and Karna battle once again. At first, both opponents prove to be evenly matched until Karna decides to unleash his ultimate Noble Phantasm. Sieg is unable to repel the attack but is saved by Astolfo, who uses Achilles' shield (which Achilles entrusted to Astolfo to fulfill Chiron's request) to protect them from Karna's attack. Sieg then takes advantage of the opening and defeats Karna by stabbing him in the chest. Karna congratulates Sieg on his victory, and warns him that Shakespeare has laid a trap for Jeanne before fading away. Achilles and Atalanta continue to battle, and while Achilles is successful in forcing Atalanta back into her regular form, the battle results in both servants mortally wounding each other. As they fade away, Atalanta expresses sadness for Achilles sacrificing his life to redeem her, while Achilles is happy that he can pass on without any regrets. Jeanne encounters Semiramis, but she allows Jeanne to proceed without a fight, knowing that she will be eliminated by Shakespeare's trap.
23	"Going Beyond"; Transliteration: "Kanata e To" (Japanese: 彼方へと)	December 16, 2017
Mordred and Sisigou confront Semiramis and begin to battle. However, Semiramis quickly gains the upper hand and incapacitates Mordred with a powerful poison. She then offers to spare Mordred's life if she turns on Sisigou. Mordred reflects on her past and realizes that she didn't really want to become king to usurp King Arthur. Instead, her true intention was to free her father from the shackles of being king, which required sacrificing all emotion and humanity. Sisigou arrives and administers an antidote to Mordred to counter Semiramis' poison and Mordred attacks again, with Sisigou providing a distraction. Mordred is able to kill Semiramis but Sisigou is mortally wounded. He mentions that during the battle, he realized his true wish was to resurrect his daughter rather than eliminate his family curse. Despite Sisigou's advice to make a contract with another master, Mordred chooses to die alongside him. Astolfo and Sieg continue after Jeanne, but Astolfo is caught in a magical trap, forcing Sieg to continue alone. Jeanne confronts Shakespeare, who traps her in an illusion and taunts her with memories of her past, as well as her conflicted feelings over Sieg. Shakespeare then summons another Servant, Gilles de Rais, one of Jeanne's comrades. Gilles points out the inherent contradiction in Jeanne wanting to treat all humans equally, yet giving Sieg special treatment. Unable to admit she is in love with Sieg, Jeanne suffers a mental breakdown.
24	"The Holy Grail War"; Transliteration: "Seihai Sensō" (Japanese: 聖杯戦争)	December 23, 2017
Shiro emerges from the Grail, explaining to Jeanne that he plans to materialize all of humanity's souls so that they can exist without physical bodies, therefore eliminating all conflict and achieving their salvation. Sieg then arrives and argues that humans are not inherently evil, and that they are always fighting their dark sides. Jeanne comes to her senses, and realizes that Shiro forcing his salvation upon humanity will only rob them of their potential by making them incapable of change. She convinces Gilles to fight for her again, and he sacrifices himself to protect Jeanne as she unleashes her second Noble Phantasm, La Pucelle. As she readies her attack, Jeanne finally accepts her feelings for Sieg. Shiro is barely able to block Jeanne's attack and loses an arm in the process. Having used up all of her power, Jeanne fades away, leaving behind Laeticia, the girl she possessed, but not before reassuring Sieg that they will meet again. Astolfo and Caules arrive, but are blocked by a heavily-wounded Semiramis. Angry at Shiro, Sieg engages in a sword fight with him, managing to fight him on equal terms despite no longer having any Command Spells to use Siegfried's power. Caules then realizes that Sieg has been carrying a part of Frankenstein's Monster's power ever since he had been hit with a bolt of lightning from her Blasted Tree attack. While Shiro is able to critically wound Sieg, Sieg grabs Shiro and initiates his own Blasted Tree attack, engulfing the both of them in a massive explosion.
25	"Apocrypha"; Transliteration: "Apokurifa" (Japanese: アポクリファ)	December 30, 2017
In the aftermath of the explosion, Semiramis is able to spirit Shiro away, but the both of them are mortally wounded. Shiro accepts his defeat, as well as Semiramis' feelings for him before they both die. Sieg and Astolfo wake up to find themselves inside the Grail, where it asks them for their wish. Unable to countermand Shiro's wish to give all of humanity immortality, Sieg instead wishes to turn himself into a dragon so he can carry the Grail to the Reverse Side of the World, an alternate dimension where the Grail's magic will have no effect on humanity. Astolfo reluctantly leaves after Sieg gives him his last order, which is to bring joy to other people. Astolfo, Caules, and Laeticia escape the Hanging Gardens as it collapses and witness Sieg carrying the Grail away. Shakespeare also witnesses this, and inspired by the sight, finally finishes writing the conclusion to his story before fading away. After the conclusion of war, the Mage Association accepts Caules back into their ranks in recognition for his role in stopping Shiro, Fiore has given up being a mage and enters rehabilitation to regain the use of her legs, Laeticia returns home, and Astolfo leaves on an adventure to carry out Sieg's last order. Some unknown amount of time later, Jeanne's spirit manages to reach the Reverse Side of the World, where she reunites with Sieg and turns him back into human form. Before leaving together on a new journey, Jeanne finally tells Sieg she loves him.

== Themes ==
Writing in The Encyclopedia of Science Fiction, Piotr Konieczny interprets Sieg's progression from a manufactured servant to an autonomous individual as an exploration of identity, freedom and the ethics of creating artificial life. He contrasts Sieg's development with Frankenstein's monster, who likewise seeks recognition as a person but sacrifices herself during the conflict. Konieczny also identifies the forced immortality proposed by Amakusa as a conflict between universal salvation and the right of individuals to choose their own futures.

Konieczny discusses the series' reinterpretations of legendary and historical figures, including the depiction of Mordred, Frankenstein's monster and Jack the Ripper as female characters. He highlights Mordred's relationship with Shishigō and her resentment of King Arthur, as well as Astolfo's portrayal as an androgynous, cross-dressing male character. He describes Astolfo as particularly prominent in online fan culture, calling him "one of anime's most recognizable gender-nonconforming characters, arguably transcending the fame of the series itself", while criticizing the sexualized presentation of the childlike Jack the Ripper.

Konieczny situates the series within science fantasy and urban fantasy, observing that its system of magic is presented as a structured, quasi-scientific discipline. He also notes that the alternate-world setting allows the Fate franchise to present conflicting versions of historical figures and Grail Wars within separate continuities.

== Reception ==
Fate/Apocrypha won Best TV Anime at the 2017 Newtype Anime Awards, where Yūichirō Higashide also received the screenplay award.

Kim Morrissy of Anime News Network praised the series' action and animation, describing its more movement-focused visual style as a refreshing alternative to Ufotable's Fate adaptations. She also considered its large ensemble generally effective, singling out Astolfo and Mordred among its most memorable characters, but found that the size of the cast limited individual character development and sometimes made the plot difficult to follow. Reviewing the second half, Morrissy was more critical of the writing, arguing that Sieg lacked the personality to sustain the story as its protagonist and that some later developments relied on narrative convenience. She nevertheless remained invested in the supporting cast and regarded the series as entertaining for its spectacle and frequent action scenes.

Also writing for Anime News Network, Rebecca Silverman praised the attention given to the Servants' historical and literary identities, arguing that this allowed them to function as characters rather than merely participants in the Grail War. She particularly highlighted the treatment of Achilles and Chiron and considered Siegfried, Astolfo and Jeanne among the more engaging characters. Silverman later praised the religious and philosophical conflict involving Amakusa Shirō, Jeanne and Sieg and thought that the series ultimately brought its themes of wishes and humanity to a satisfying conclusion, although she found the storytelling near the finale somewhat jumbled and the ending overly neat. She described the animation as generally strong but inconsistent, with some action sequences sacrificing consistency of character design for fluidity and spectacle.

Summarizing the critical response in The Encyclopedia of Science Fiction, Konieczny describes reception as mixed to positive. He reports praise for the animation and varied cast, especially Astolfo, Mordred and Joan of Arc, alongside criticism of the number of characters, limited development of some supporting figures and plot conveniences. He also identifies Sieg as a divisive protagonist: his reserved personality fits his emergence into independent personhood, but many critics found him insufficiently engaging to carry the central narrative.

== Related media ==
The original light novels were supplemented by the setting book Fate/Apocrypha material (2015). Akira Ishida adapted the story as a sixteen-volume manga published from 2016 to 2024, with additional attention to some supporting characters. The web radio programme Fate/Apocrypha Radio Trifas! ran in 2017–2018 and again in 2021. Characters from the series subsequently appeared in Fate/Grand Order, including the 2018 Apocrypha/Inheritance of Glory crossover event. The light novel Fate:Lost Einherjar – Aslaug of the Aurora (2022), by Hikaru Sakurai with illustrations by Shirow Miwa, takes place in the same parallel world approximately a decade later. The anime's score, composed by Masaru Yokoyama, was originally released in 2017. A 53-track compilation, Fate/Apocrypha Original Soundtrack, was released by Aniplex on October 27, 2021, featuring previously unreleased music and a remix by TeddyLoid.
