= Sugoi Japan Award =

Award for anime, manga, and novels

- Awarded for: "Outstanding works in the four divisions of Manga, Anime, Light novel and Entertainment novel"
- Country: Japan
- Presented by: Yomiuri Shimbun
- First award: 2015
- Website: sugoi-japan.jp

Sugoi Japan Award (すごいジャパンアワード, Sugoi Japan Awādo) is an event established by Yomiuri Shimbun in 2015. Awards are given in four categories: Manga, Anime, Light novel and Entertainment novel. In the first year, the award was given to Puella Magi Madoka Magica as 'Grand Prix'.

The word Sugoi is a Japanese word meaning amazing, wonderful and great.

== Winners ==
=== 2015 ===
- Manga award: Attack on Titan
- Anime award: Puella Magi Madoka Magica (Grand Prix)
- Light novel award: My Youth Romantic Comedy Is Wrong, as I Expected
- Entertainment novel award: Library War

=== 2016 ===
- Manga award: One Punch Man
- Anime award: Your Lie in April
- Light novel award: Is It Wrong to Try to Pick Up Girls in a Dungeon?
- Entertainment novel award: The Empire of Corpses

=== 2017 ===
- Manga award: My Hero Academia
- Anime award: Re:Zero − Starting Life in Another World
- Light novel award: Re:Zero − Starting Life in Another World
- Entertainment novel award: Your Name

== See also ==
- List of animation awards
- List of manga awards
