= List of manga awards =

The kanji for "manga" from Seasonal Passersby (Shiki no Yukikai), 1798, by Santō Kyōden and Kitao Shigemasa.

This list of manga awards is an index to articles about notable awards for manga, comics or graphic novels created in Japan or using the Japanese language and conforming to a style developed in Japan in the late 19th century.

== Awards ==
Country	Award	Venue / sponsor	Notes
United States	American Manga Awards	Japan Society, Anime NYC	Manga. First year August 2024
Japan	Akatsuka Award	Shueisha	New manga artist in the comedy manga category From 1974
United States	American Anime Awards	New York Comic Con	Excellence in the release of anime and manga in North America From 2007
France	Prix Babelio	Babelio	Manga category
Japan	Bungeishunjū Manga Award	Bungeishunjū	Gag, yonkoma, one-panel, and satirical manga From 1955. Inactive
Japan	Dengeki Comic Grand Prix	ASCII Media Works	Original one-shot manga
United Kingdom	Eagle Award	Mike Conroy, Cassandra Conroy	Favourite Manga Comic. From 2000. Inactive
United States	Harvey Award	Harvey Awards Executive Committee	Best Manga Title that has been translated into English. Since 2018
Japan	International Manga Award	Minister for Foreign Affairs (Japan)	Non-Japanese manga artists
Japan	Japan Cartoonists Association Award	Japan Cartoonists Association	Manga
Japan	Kodansha Manga Award	Kodansha	Serialized manga
Japan	Manga Taishō	Manga Taishō	Manga
Japan	Next Manga Award	Da Vinci Niconico	Manga
Japan	Seiun Award	Federation of Science Fiction Fan Groups of Japan	Best Comic of Science fiction
Japan	Shogakukan Manga Award	Shogakukan Publishing	Manga
Japan	Saito Takao Award	The Saito Takao Gekiga Cultural Foundation	Manga
Japan	Sugoi Japan Award	Yomiuri Shimbun	Manga, Anime, Light novel and Entertainment novel
Japan	Tsutaya Comic Award	Culture Convenience Club	Manga
Japan	Tezuka Award	Shueisha	Manga
Japan	Tezuka Osamu Cultural Prize	Asahi Shimbun	Manga
Japan	Japan Media Arts Festival	Agency for Cultural Affairs	Manga
France	Japan Expo Awards	Japan Expo	Manga

== See also ==
- Lists of awards
- List of media awards
- List of comics awards
