= Fate/Apocrypha (soundtrack) =

Fate/Apocrypha Original Soundtrack

Soundtrack album by Masaru Yokoyama
- Released: October 27, 2021
- Studio: Miracle Bus Studio
- Genres: Anime; J-pop
- Length: 2:00:07 (Note: Duration is different on various music streaming platforms.)
- Label: Aniplex
- Compiler: Masaru Yokoyama

The soundtrack for the 2017 Japanese fantasy anime television series Fate/Apocrypha, based on an alternate timeline from Type Moon's visula novel game Fate/stay night, consists of an original score composed by Masaru Yokoyama. The soundtrack was originally released in 2017, and later re-released on October 27, 2021, through Aniplex.

== Background and composition ==
Fate/Apocrypha Original Soundtrack was originally released in 2017, and later re-released on October 27, 2021. The soundtrack contains 53 tracks, and has a runtime of around 2 hours. Its artwork was designed by Yuki Yamada. The soundtrack also includes unreleased tracks and a remix by Japanese DJ TeddyLoid.

== Reception ==
Anime UK News' reviewer Onosume felt that while the soundtrack "fits the series well and heightens its many action scenes", it was "very repetitive" and had the same common themes returning over and over again. While Darkstorm had wrote that Yokoyama's sound tracks was "fully orchestral", and that "his score swings from the tender moments to the heart-thumping battles with incredible ease".

== Track listing ==
Fate/Apocrypha Original Soundtrack I track listing
| No. | Title | Length |
|---|---|---|
| 1. | "Fate/Apocrypha" | 4:34 |
| 2. | "Necromancer" | 2:03 |
| 3. | "The Great Holy Grail War" | 2:42 |
| 4. | "The Great Holy Grail War - Ambience Mix" | 2:05 |
| 5. | "Tense Encounter" | 1:44 |
| 6. | "Sieg - Nightmare" | 1:32 |
| 7. | "Say Hello" | 2:13 |
| 8. | "Thoughts Flows On" | 1:40 |
| 9. | "in the Past" | 1:54 |
| 10. | "A Mystic Meeting" | 1:56 |
| 11. | "Ambition" | 2:18 |
| 12. | "Where it begins" | 2:24 |
| 13. | "The Knight of Rebellion" | 2:28 |
| 14. | "Ruler - Prayer" | 2:09 |
| 15. | "Ruler - Execution" | 1:59 |
| 16. | "Fate/Apocrypha - Battle" | 2:25 |
| 17. | "What Comes Next" | 1:43 |
| 18. | "Affection" | 2:01 |
| 19. | "Sieg - Alive" | 2:01 |
| 20. | "Invasion" | 2:11 |
| 21. | "Sexology" | 1:34 |
| 22. | "Everything is a Story" | 1:51 |
| 23. | "Something's Going On" | 1:39 |
| 24. | "Jack the Ripper" | 2:12 |
| 25. | "Fate/Apocrypha - Hope" | 1:48 |
| 26. | "Savior" | 3:20 |
| Total length: | | 56:37 |

Fate/Apocrypha Original Soundtrack II track listing
| No. | Title | Length |
|---|---|---|
| 1. | "Amakusa Shirou Tokisada" | 3:02 |
| 2. | "Fate/Apocrypha – Confronting" | 1:43 |
| 3. | "Insanity of Dominator" | 2:35 |
| 4. | "Intensity of Lord" | 2:12 |
| 5. | "Have a Vision" | 1:46 |
| 6. | "Breakthrough" | 1:54 |
| 7. | "Grand War" | 1:49 |
| 8. | "Battle - Black Faction" | 2:10 |
| 9. | "Glory of the King" | 1:39 |
| 10. | "Ruler - Sanctity" | 2:00 |
| 11. | "Sieg - Will" | 2:12 |
| 12. | "Sieg - Despair" | 1:52 |
| 13. | "Battle - Red Faction" | 1:38 |
| 14. | "Fate/Apocrypha - Rising" | 1:50 |
| 15. | "Fate/Apocrypha - Before Dawn" | 2:23 |
| 16. | "Freedom" | 1:32 |
| 17. | "Joy of Life" | 1:44 |
| 18. | "Fearless Smile" | 1:44 |
| 19. | "In the Dream" | 1:34 |
| 20. | "Fate/Apocrypha - Love" | 1:59 |
| 21. | "Bloody Soul" | 2:02 |
| 22. | "Requiem" | 2:27 |
| 23. | "Afterglow" | 1:38 |
| 24. | "La Pucelle" | 2:46 |
| 25. | "Justeaze" | 1:36 |
| 26. | "Say Goodbye" | 2:35 |
| 27. | "Apocrypha" | 2:04 |
| Total length: | | 54:26 |

== Personnel ==
Credits adapted from media notes.

- Masaru Yokoyama – composer
- Mitsunori Aizawa – recording
