= Dengeki Comic Grand Prix =

Japanese manga award

The Dengeki Comic Grand Prix (電撃コミックグランプリ, Dengeki Komikku Guran Puri) is an award handed out semiannually (from 2004–2009) and annually (since 2010) by the Japanese publisher ASCII Media Works (formerly MediaWorks) for original one-shot manga. Between the first and fifth contests held, there were two divisions: original and anthology. This was changed with the sixth contest to a Daioh/Gao! division which covered shōnen manga, and a Sylph division which covered shōjo manga. Between the seventh and twelfth contests, the two divisions were changed to simply shōnen and shōjo manga. Starting with the 13th contest in 2011, a seinen manga division was added. There are three types of prizes given out each contest: the Grand Prix Prize (2 million yen), the Semi-Grand Prix Prize (500,000 yen), and the Excellence Prize (300,000 yen). The Grand Prix Prize has only been handed out four times in the contest's history: in 2004, 2005, 2010 and 2012. There was also once a Dengeki Moeoh Grand Prize division which was held twice with a Grand Prize and Honorable Mentions.

== Prize winners ==
=== 2004–2010 ===
#	Year	Division							
01	2004	Original				Anthology			
01	2004	Grand Prix	Semi-Grand Prix	Excellence Prize	Honorable Mention	Grand Prix	Semi-Grand Prix	Excellence Prize	Honorable Mention
01	2004	Akarui Raise no Tsukurikata; Ruiki Akiba	Seeds; Atsushi Suzumi	Sekaiichi no Mikata; Yomi Namiki	Gabriel no Ryōken; Nato Mikio	Not awarded	Chika no Baai; Yutaka Masaki	Melancholy; Ryūi Masui	Lottery Lolita; Shō Hōjō
01	2004	Akarui Raise no Tsukurikata; Ruiki Akiba	Seeds; Atsushi Suzumi	Sekaiichi no Mikata; Yomi Namiki	Gabriel no Ryōken; Nato Mikio	Not awarded	Chika no Baai; Yutaka Masaki	Natsubate Taisaku; Mari Manishi	Suppai Ichigo Mashimaro; Terapii
02	2005	Not awarded	Murder Rabbit Wanted; Yoshino Koyoka	Nekora wa Minna Ikiteru; Junkō Miruzumi	Ofuro no Keroyo; Kami Inakai	Not awarded	Not awarded	What's Going on the Anthology? Hayashi Imano	7 Haku 8-nichi 300-yen Rei Yūhana
02	2005	Not awarded	Murder Rabbit Wanted; Yoshino Koyoka	Mahōya e Yōkoso! Kiyoshi Nanoya	Hitori Omoi Hanashi Nyūmon; Shukue Kawanaka	Not awarded	Not awarded	What's Going on the Anthology? Hayashi Imano	Strawberry Spice Everyday; Yun Kōsaka
03	2005	Green Wheezers; Sachi Kurafugi	Ihabu; Kajiki Nora	Hi! How are you today? Tō Haibara	On Rei Shi; Yuzi	Not awarded	DearS Hunting; Suiren Matsukaze	Matsuri no Tamago; Sumire Aoi	Mihane no Kōsaku; Aoba Matsukaze
03	2005	Green Wheezers; Sachi Kurafugi	Oni Aka; Hota.	Hi! How are you today? Tō Haibara	Shugo Seishi Tenko; Nekomaru Nekoyashiki	Not awarded	DearS Hunting; Suiren Matsukaze	Matsuri no Tamago; Sumire Aoi	Halloween Mashimaro + Iroiro Mashimaro; Ichi Kyojūgawa
04	2006	Not awarded	Tomi o Kakeru Majo; Ginyūshijin	Domestic Medicaloid Satsuki; Rō Mishidia	Ri-Writing Noa; Sayaka Iaoi	Not awarded	Not awarded	Katsuteba Kangun! Takahiro Sakaki	Not awarded
04	2006	Not awarded	Tomi o Kakeru Majo; Ginyūshijin	Domestic Medicaloid Satsuki; Rō Mishidia	Burokura - Tōhō Matsuriki; Kōsaku Makaze	Not awarded	Not awarded	Katsuteba Kangun! Takahiro Sakaki	Not awarded
05	2006	Not awarded	Land's End; Takahiro Endō	Early Service-like Nichijō; Imigimuru	Koto no wa Techō; Mei Fumizuki	Not awarded	Not awarded	Not awarded	Not awarded
05	2006	Not awarded	Land's End; Takahiro Endō	Wake Ari! My Room; Junko Ogino	Koto no wa Techō; Mei Fumizuki	Not awarded	Not awarded	Not awarded	Not awarded
05	2006	Not awarded	Land's End; Takahiro Endō	Aru Shimai to Kuma; Yūsu Kurahashi	Koto no wa Techō; Mei Fumizuki	Not awarded	Not awarded	Not awarded	Not awarded
06	2007	Daioh/Gao!				Sylph			
06	2007	Not awarded	Gosenzo-sama! Itadakimasu! Azusa Shitō	Hankōki × Hanjūryoku; Inei Inei	Haiiro Shōjo ni Sekai wa Seijakusuru; Sako Sorakogen	Not awarded	Wheel Roads Tōri no Akuma Tsukai; Fūka Mizuya	Guida = File; Yuzu Morino	Deep Forest; Sei Kanzaki
06	2007	Not awarded	Gosenzo-sama! Itadakimasu! Azusa Shitō	Ichigo Shinbunhaitatsu Hiyori! Maitake	Haiiro Shōjo ni Sekai wa Seijakusuru; Sako Sorakogen	Not awarded	Wheel Roads Tōri no Akuma Tsukai; Fūka Mizuya	Tenohira no Kioku; Inagi Fūmori	Deep Forest; Sei Kanzaki
07	2007	Shōnen manga				Shōjo manga			
07	2007	Not awarded	Can you Fly? Tatsu Nohana	Yūhigaoka Dōbutsuen no Kōtei-san; Mikan Tōno	Toriaizu Reset de Nell	Not awarded		Shōjo Rinbu; Yōko Ito	Oretachi no Hōhō; Nao Ōsawa
07	2007	Not awarded	Yuina; Sayaka Yoshimoto	Yūhigaoka Dōbutsuen no Kōtei-san; Mikan Tōno	Merry Sei...! Ryūji Gen	Not awarded		Yoi Hitoya; Mizu Kogai	Kaze no Yakusoku; Utako Sadō
08	2008	Not awarded	Rin Nana Idol to Issho! Ryū Kōtei	3LDKM; Bkub Okawa	Akane Mōke; Yutaka Ōhori	Not awarded		La Vie en rose Miharu Ihara	My×Bodyguard; Midori Murasaki
08	2008	Not awarded	Rin Nana Idol to Issho! Ryū Kōtei	3LDKM; Bkub Okawa	Furufuru Seek; Saneatsu Gōno	Not awarded		Sweet Life; Giga Chōjū	Which? Tobira Mizuki
08	2008	Not awarded	Rin Nana Idol to Issho! Ryū Kōtei	3LDKM; Bkub Okawa	Demons Heights; Tsukudani	Not awarded		Sweet Life; Giga Chōjū	Which? Tobira Mizuki
09	2008	Not awarded	Uchū no Tamago to Emu no Riron; Kashi	Mahō Shōjo Senmon Gakkō no Hitobito; Hoppō Ōshū	Karen na Otome no Supremacy; Kazuma Takauchi	Not awarded		Chiisana Bokura no Takaramono; Mayu Fujita	Goshujin-sama wa Aku no Sōtō; Moa Hato
09	2008	Not awarded	Uchū no Tamago to Emu no Riron; Kashi	Bluebell; Kaziya	Karen na Otome no Supremacy; Kazuma Takauchi	Not awarded		Chiisana Bokura no Takaramono; Mayu Fujita	Kimi no Sachiare!! Maata
10	2009	Not awarded	Shōjo M Hiroki Hiromoto	Angie no Ren'ai Jōju Sangensoku; Rakko Asakura	Dakimakura no Kamisama; Takenobu	Not awarded		Engage Battle; Min Sakusaka	Inu Mimi!! Satoru Okamoto
10	2009	Not awarded	Shōjo M Hiroki Hiromoto	Angie no Ren'ai Jōju Sangensoku; Rakko Asakura	Mainichi ga Dramatic; Nagi Nakahara	Not awarded		Engage Battle; Min Sakusaka	Futsū no Ko. Sakura
10	2009	Not awarded	Shōjo M Hiroki Hiromoto	Angie no Ren'ai Jōju Sangensoku; Rakko Asakura	2×1; Yukako	Not awarded		Engage Battle; Min Sakusaka	Futsū no Ko. Sakura
11	2009	Not awarded	Fukukami!? Sōmatō	Kuromiko; Fumitaka Morizuki	Siren to Gomiyashiki; Yūki Abe	Not awarded	Yūgure Junction; Haruta Mayuzumi	Not awarded	Cafe T Cherry; Tomohiro Fujii (story); Chiyo (art)
11	2009	Not awarded	Ashita kara Ganbaru; Morichika	Kuromiko; Fumitaka Morizuki	Popokuro; Atsuto Sakayaki	Not awarded	Yūgure Junction; Haruta Mayuzumi	Not awarded	Dame ni Peki! Non Meeda
12	2010	Black Theater; Shunsei	Sagiri Mairu! Taisuke Umeki	Figure Planet; Chazuke Ume	Not awarded	Not awarded	Weather Report; Nagami	Megane no Kuni no Alice; Emu	Not awarded
12	2010	Black Theater; Shunsei	Bake-mono-cation; Kōsuke Kurata	Supuravu Toravu; Mercre	Not awarded	Not awarded	Weather Report; Nagami	Megane no Kuni no Alice; Emu	Not awarded

=== 2011–present ===
#	Year	Division											
13	2011	Shōnen manga				Shōjo manga				Seinen manga			
13	2011	Grand Prix	Semi-Grand Prix	Excellence Prize	Honorable Mention	Grand Prix	Semi-Grand Prix	Excellence Prize	Honorable Mention	Grand Prix	Semi-Grand Prix	Excellence Prize	Honorable Mention
13	2011	Not awarded	Seimon no Bōshokusha; Morinohon	Tenohira no Hoshi; Momo Maeda	Murastration; Tsumoi Hara	Not awarded	Styling Vivid; Kikonomi	Not awarded	Kazukago no Uta; Yū Usui	Not awarded	Bōken Koshoten Natsume Dō; Kakuji Fujita	Futanari Kanojo; Niku	Mome!! Hibiki Hamaguchi
13	2011	Not awarded	Seimon no Bōshokusha; Morinohon	Tenohira no Hoshi; Momo Maeda	Murastration; Tsumoi Hara	Not awarded	Styling Vivid; Kikonomi	Not awarded	Yūrei Shōjo to Otsukiai! Torii Ninna	Not awarded	Bōken Koshoten Natsume Dō; Kakuji Fujita	Futanari Kanojo; Niku	Mome!! Hibiki Hamaguchi
13	2011	Not awarded	Seimon no Bōshokusha; Morinohon	Tenohira no Hoshi; Momo Maeda	Murastration; Tsumoi Hara	Not awarded	Styling Vivid; Kikonomi	Not awarded	Okaken; Rats	Not awarded	Bōken Koshoten Natsume Dō; Kakuji Fujita	Futanari Kanojo; Niku	Mome!! Hibiki Hamaguchi
14	2012	Thread; Ink Ao	Dakini; Sigama	Kore ga Boku no Seigi da Tō Mizuguchi	Jūjiro Contract! Aoi Aioi	Not awarded	Gekka no Yūutsu Ōji; Mako Nishio	Not awarded	Not awarded	Not awarded	Gesui yo! Hanamura-san; Kiyu Kibako	Mahō Shōjo Rurika to Uehara Ikka; A Sano	Not awarded
14	2012	Thread; Ink Ao	Dakini; Sigama	Kore ga Boku no Seigi da Tō Mizuguchi	Master Piece; Umeboshi	Not awarded	Gekka no Yūutsu Ōji; Mako Nishio	Not awarded	Not awarded	Not awarded	Gesui yo! Hanamura-san; Kiyu Kibako	Sleeper Hold; Yutsuki	Not awarded

== See also ==
- List of manga awards
