= Ensemble Stars! =

Japanese game franchise

- Promotional image for the anime

あんさんぶるスターズ！ (Ansanburu Sutāzu!)
- Genre: School life
- Video game
- Developer: Cacalia Studio
- Publisher: Happy Elements K.K.
- Genre: Life simulation
- Platform: iOS; Android
- Released: JP: April 28, 2015 (Android) May 1, 2015 (iOS)
- Manga
- Written by: Sayo Ichi
- Published by: Kodansha
- Magazine: Aria
- Original run: August 28, 2015 – December 28, 2016
- Volumes: 4
- Anime television series
- Directed by: Yasufumi Soejima; Mazakazu Hishida
- Written by: Shinichi Inotsume; Akira
- Music by: Tatsuya Kato
- Studio: David Production
- Licensed by: NA: Funimation
- Original network: Tokyo MX, SUN, KBS, TVA, BS11
- Original run: July 7, 2019 – December 22, 2019
- Episodes: 24
- Anime film

Ensemble Stars!! Road to Show!!
- Directed by: Asami Nakatani (chief); Mazakazu Hishida
- Written by: Seitarō Kino
- Music by: Tatsuya Kato
- Studio: David Production
- Released: March 4, 2022
- Runtime: 72 minutes
- Original net animation

Ensemble Stars!! Recollection Selection: Element
- Directed by: Osamu Yamasaki
- Written by: Shinichi Inotsume; Akira
- Music by: Kenji Kawai
- Studio: Dandelion Animation Studio; Happy Elements Cacalia Studio
- Released: April 6, 2023 – April 11, 2023
- Episodes: 6

Ensemble Stars! (あんさんぶるスターズ！, Ansanburu Sutāzu!) is a Japanese game franchise developed by Cacalia Studio and published by Happy Elements K.K., the Japanese division of the Chinese company Happy Elements. A spin-off of the 2012 game Ensemble Girls!, it was first released as a life simulation gacha game on Google Play on April 28, 2015, and on the App Store on May 1, 2015.

On March 9, 2020, Ensemble Stars! was rebranded and relaunched under the title Ensemble Stars!! (あんさんぶるスターズ！！, Ansanburu Sutāzu!!; with two exclamation marks), with the original app split into two games catering to different gameplay styles: Ensemble Stars!! Basic, the original game; and Ensemble Stars!! Music, a rhythm game.

The success of the game led to several stage plays and manga adaptations. An anime television series by David Production aired from July 7 to December 22, 2019. A theatrical anime premiered on March 4, 2022.

== Characters ==
=== Ensemble Square ===
Anzu (あんず, Anzu)
Voiced by: Maaya Sakamoto (Japanese); Felecia Angelle (English)
Anzu is the main protagonist and player character of the franchise.

=== Starmaker Production ===
==== fine ====
Eichi Tenshouin (天祥院 英智, Tenshōin Eichi)
Voiced by: Hikaru Midorikawa (Japanese); Aaron Dismuke (English)
Wataru Hibiki (日々樹 渉, Hibiki Wataru)
Voiced by: Takuya Eguchi (Japanese); Aaron Roberts (English)
Tori Himemiya (姫宮 桃李, Himemiya Tōri)
Voiced by: Ayumu Murase (Japanese); Mikaela Krantz (English)
Yuzuru Fushimi (伏見 弓弦, Fushimi Yuzuru)
Voiced by: Kotaro Hashimoto (Japanese); Evin Wood (simulcast), Chris Burnett (home video) (English)

==== Trickstar ====
Hokuto Hidaka (氷鷹 北斗, Hidaka Hokuto)
Voiced by: Yoshimasa Hosoya (2015-2017), Tomoaki Maeno (2017-present) (Japanese); Adam Gibbs (English)
Subaru Akehoshi (明星 スバル, Akehoshi Subaru)
Voiced by: Tetsuya Kakihara (Japanese); Garret Storms (English)
Makoto Yūki (遊木 真, Yūki Makoto)
Voiced by: Showtaro Morikubo (Japanese); Jerry Jewell (English)
Mao Isara (衣更 真緒, Isara Mao)
Voiced by: Yuki Kaji (Japanese); David Matranga (English)

==== RYUSEITAI (流星隊) ====
Tetora Nagumo (南雲鉄虎, Nagumo Tetora)
Voiced by: Yoshiki Nakajima (Japanese); Kyle Igneczi (English)
Midori Takamine (高峯翠, Takamine Midori)
Voiced by: Takumi Watanabe (Japanese); Jason Liebrecht (English)
Shinobu Sengoku (仙石忍, Sengoku Shinobu)
Voiced by: Anju Nitta (Japanese); Christopher Llewyn Ramirez (English)
Chiaki Morisawa (守沢千秋, Morisawa Chiaki)
Voiced by: Yuichi Jose (Japanese); Aaron Campbell (English)
Kanata Shinkai (深海奏汰, Shinkai Kanata)
Voiced by: Kōtarō Nishiyama (Japanese); Brandon McInnis (English)

==== ALKALOID ====
Hiiro Amagi (天城一彩, Amagi Hiiro)
Voiced by: Gakuto Kajiwara
Aira Shiratori (白鳥藍良, Shiratori Aira)
Voiced by: Kōhei Amasaki
Mayoi Ayase (礼瀬 マヨイ, Ayase Mayoi)
Voiced by: Chiharu Shigematsu
Tatsumi Kazehaya (風早巽, Kazehaya Tatsumi)
Voiced by: Masatomo Nakazawa

=== Cosmic Production ===
==== Eden ====
Nagisa Ran (乱凪砂, Ran Nagisa)
Voiced by: Junichi Suwabe (Japanese); David Wald (English)
Hiyori Tomoe (巴日和, Tomoe Hiyori)
Voiced by: Natsuki Hanae (Japanese); Dallas Reid (English)
Ibara Saegusa (七種茨, Saegusa Ibara)
Voiced by: Ryōta Ōsaka (Japanese); Stephen Fu (English)
Jun Sazanami (漣 ジュン, Sazanami Jun)
Voiced by: Yuma Uchida (Japanese); Orion Pitts (English)

==== Valkyrie ====
Shu Itsuki (斎宮宗, Itsuki Shū)
Voiced by: Hiroki Takahashi (Japanese); Shawn Gann (English)
Mika Kagehira (影片みか, Kagehira Mika)
Voiced by: Jun Osuka (Japanese); Clifford Chapin (English)

==== 2wink ====
Hinata Aoi (葵ひなた, Aoi Hinata)
Yuta Aoi (葵ゆうた, Aoi Yūta)
Both Voiced by: Soma Saito (Japanese); Justin Duncan (English)

==== Crazy:B ====
Rinne Amagi (天城燐音, Amagi Rinne)
Voiced by: Yōhei Azakami
Himeru (ひめる)
Voiced by: Jun Kasama
Kohaku Oukawa (桜河 こはく, Ōkawa Kohaku)
Voiced by: Tasuku Kaito
Niki Shiina (椎名 ニキ, Shiina Niki)
Voiced by: Tomohiro Yamaguchi

=== Rhythm Link ===
==== UNDEAD ====
Rei Sakuma (朔間 零, Sakuma Rei)
Voiced by: Toshiki Masuda (Japanese); Anthony Bowling (English)
Kaoru Hakaze (羽風 薫, Hakaze Kaoru)
Voiced by: Kei Hosogai (Japanese); Jessie James Grelle (English)
Koga Ogami (大神晃牙, Ōgami Kōga)
Voiced by: Yūki Ono (Japanese); Ricco Fajardo (English)
Adonis Otogari (乙狩アドニス, Otogari Adonisu)
Voiced by: Wataru Hatano (Japanese); Taylor Harris (English)

==== Ra*bits ====
Tomoya Mashiro (真白友也, Mashiro Tomoya)
Voiced by: Shunya Hiruma (Japanese); Blake McNamara (English)
Nazuna Nito (仁兎なずな, Nito Nazuna)
Voiced by: Yuki Yonai (Japanese); Stephen Sanders (English)
Mitsuru Tenma (天満光, Tenma Mitsuru)
Voiced by: Junya Ikeda (2015–2023), Daiki Kobayashi (2023-present) (Japanese); Derek Whitener (English)
Hajime Shino (紫之創, Shino Hajime)
Voiced by: Tomoya Kosaka (Japanese); Brittney Karbowski (English)

==== AKATSUKI (紅月) ====
Keito Hasumi (蓮巳敬人, Hasumi Keito)
Voiced by: Yūichirō Umehara (Japanese); Daman Mills (English)
Kuro Kiryu (鬼龍紅郎, Kiryū Kurō)
Voiced by: Shinichiro Kamio (Japanese); Jarrod Greene (English)
Souma Kanzaki (神崎颯馬, Kanzaki Sōma)
Voiced by: Keisuke Kaminaga (Japanese); Patrick McAlister (English)
Ibuki Taki (滝 維吹, Taki Ibuki)
Voiced by: Chiaki Kobayashi

==== MELLOW DEAR US ====
Juis Kojika (小鹿ジュイス, Kojika Juisu)
Voiced by: Ryota Iwasaki
Nozomi Madoka (円果望見, Madoka Nozomi)
Voiced by: Fumiya Imai
Mashu Kuon (久遠舞珠, Kuon Mashuu)
Voiced by: Fumito Tsuji
Chitose Tsuzura (甘楽チトセ, Tsuzura Chitose)
Voiced by: Sonosuke Hattori

=== New Dimension ===
==== Knights ====
Tsukasa Suou (朱桜司, Suō Tsukasa)
Voiced by: Reio Tsuchida (Japanese); Kyle Phillips (English)
Leo Tsukinaga (月永レオ, Tsukinaga Leo)
Voiced by: Shintarō Asanuma (Japanese); Jordan Dash Cruz (English)
Izumi Sena (瀬名泉, Sena Izumi)
Voiced by: Masami Ito (Japanese); Austin Tindle (English)
Ritsu Sakuma (朔間凛月, Sakuma Ritsu)
Voiced by: Daiki Yamashita (Japanese); Zach Bolton (English)
Arashi Narukami (鳴上嵐, Narukami Arashi)
Voiced by: Sōsuke Sōma (2015), Ryo Kitamura (2015-present) (Japanese); Matt Shipman (English)

==== Switch ====
Natsume Sakasaki (逆先夏目, Sakasaki Natsume)
Voiced by: Kenji Nojima (Japanese); Derick Snow (English)
Tsumugi Aoba (青葉つむぎ, Aoba Tsumugi)
Voiced by: Kaito Ishikawa (Japanese); Justin Briner (English)
Sora Harukawa (春川宙, Harukawa Sora)
Voiced by: Kazutomi Yamamoto (Japanese); Emily Fajardo (English)

==== MaM ====
Madara Mikejima (三毛縞斑, Mikejima Madara)
Voiced by: Kohsuke Toriumi (Japanese); Tyson Rineheart (English)

==== Special for Princess! ====
Esu Sagiri / Esu (冴霧 笑主, Sagiri Esu; Esu (エス))
Voiced by: Shuhei Toyoshima
Kanna Natsu / Kanna (名都 神無, Natsu Kanna; Kanna (カンナ))
Voiced by: Yuki Sakakihara
Fuyume Hanamura / Yume (花群 冬芽, Hanamura Fuyume; Yume (ユメ))
Voiced by: Taichi Kusano
Raika Hojo / Raika (宝丈 萊香, Hojo Raika; Raika (ライカ))
Voiced by: Yuuki Terui

=== Supporting characters ===
Jin Sagami (佐賀美陣, Sagami Jin)
Voiced by: Tomoyasu Hishiba (Japanese); Mike McFarland (English)
Akiomi Kunugi (椚章臣, Kunugi Akiomi)
Voiced by: Wataru Komada (Japanese); Brandon Potter (English)
Seiya Hidaka (氷鷹誠矢, Hidaka Seiya)
Voiced by: Shin-ichiro Miki
Gatekeeper (ゲートキーパー, Gētokīpā)
Voiced by: Shunsuke Takeuchi
Nice Arneb Thunder (ナイス・アルネブ・サンダー, Naisu Arunebu Sandā)
Voiced by: Ryōta Suzuki

== Media ==
=== Game ===
Ensemble Stars! was released for the Android on April 28, 2015, and iOS on May 1, 2015. Shortly after the game's release, in 2015, Sousuke Sōma, who provided the voice for Arashi Narukami, was replaced by Ryo Kitamura, with all voice clips replaced on July 18, 2015; Kitamura would later go on to portray the character in the stage play adaptations. In April 2017, Yoshimasa Hosoya left the franchise due to a medical hiatus, and Happy Elements announced that he would be replaced by Tomoaki Maeno in the role of Hokuto Hidaka, with all his voice clips replaced beginning on May 31, 2017.

On November 9, 2019, Happy Elements announced at the Animate Girls Festival that they would be adding two new groups, Alkaloid and Crazy B. On March 15, 2020, Ensemble Stars! was relaunched and was split into two separate games: Basic, the original game; and Music, a brand new rhythm game; both games offered different gameplay but contained the same events, storylines, and items.

In March 2016, Ensemble Stars! was planned to launch in China in Q2 2016 through Tencent. In January 2018, Ensemble Stars! was launched in South Korea through Kakao Games. On December 24, 2021, an English version of Ensemble Stars!! Music opened pre-registrations for users in the United States, Canada, Australia, and the United Kingdom. It was then officially launched on June 16, 2022.

=== Manga ===
A manga adaptation written and illustrated by Ichi Sayo was launched in Kodansha's Shōjo manga magazine Aria on August 28, 2015 and ended on December 28, 2016.

Ensembukubu Stars!, a 4-panel gag parody, drawn by Bkub Okawa, is serialized on Ensemble Stars! official Twitter account and Dengeki Online since 2017.

=== Anime ===
An anime television series adaptation was announced in December 2015. It was planned to premiere in 2017, but the staff announced they had postponed it in February 2017. The series was produced by David Production, with Marza Animation Planet producing the 3DCG live scenes, aired from July 7 to December 22, 2019, on Tokyo MX, SUN, KBS, TVA, and BS11. Masakazu Hishida was the director under the pseudonym Junpaku Yagurashita. Yasufumi Soejima was the series director, with Shinichi Inotsume as chief writer, and Haruko Iizuka, Tomoyuki Shitaya, and Eri Nagata as character designers. Akira was the scriptwriter, and Tatsuya Kato composed the series' music. Funimation has acquired the series for streaming in North America; the simuldub premiered on August 4, 2019. The anime uses the Cacani 2D animation & in-between software tool.

On September 10, 2022, a new anime project titled Ensemble Stars!! Recollection Selection (Element) (あんさんぶるスターズ！！追憶セレクション「エレメント」, Ansanburu Sutazu!! Tsuioku Serekushon "Eremento") was announced. The anime project aired from April 6 to April 11, 2023, on Ensemble Stars' official YouTube channel. The episodes are also available on the project's website.

On April 25, 2023, a new anime project titled Ensemble Stars!! Recollection Selection (Crossroads) (あんさんぶるスターズ！！追憶セレション『クロスロード』, Ansanburu Sutāzu!! Tsuioku Serekushon (Kurosurōdo)) was announced. It aired on November 3, 2023, via the Ensemble Stars' official YouTube channel.

==== Ensemble Stars! episode list ====
No.	Title	Original release date
1	"New Wind"; Transliteration: "Shinpū" (Japanese: 新風)	July 7, 2019
2	"Howl"; Transliteration: "Hōkō" (Japanese: 咆哮)	July 14, 2019
Various groups try to recruit Anzu to be their producer.
3	"Resolve"; Transliteration: "Kekkō" (Japanese: 決行)	July 21, 2019
4	"Blooming"; Transliteration: "Kaika" (Japanese: 開花)	July 28, 2019
While Akatsuki performs, Keito realizes that Rei had his group compete against them in order to steal their votes from the audience and allow Trickstar to gain an advantage. Ra*bits also secretly distributes pamphlets outlining how to vote to students outside of the venue, and 2wink intentionally stops performing halfway to let Trickstar win. After Trickstar performs "Rebellion Star", they elect Anzu to be the leader of the group. Once the audience and general votes are added, Trickstar wins the S1. Following the S1, Eichi suddenly returns to school.
5	"Marionette (Part 1)"; Transliteration: "Marionetto 〜Zenpen〜" (Japanese: マリオネット 〜前編〜)	August 4, 2019
In a flashback, Nazuna recalls the previous school year, when he was a member of the group Valkyrie with Shu and Mika, which had been the top idol group at Yumenosaki Academy at the time. Shu, the leader and a member of the Five Eccentrics, controlled Valkyrie's art direction and treated Nazuna like a doll. When Nazuna begins to change, he becomes pressured to maintain the image of his group. However, he realizes how much Shu and Mika value him when he receives birthday gifts from them. The three sell their next concert tickets together.
6	"Marionette (Part 2)"; Transliteration: "Marionetto 〜Kōhen〜" (Japanese: マリオネット 〜後編〜)	August 11, 2019
Six months later, the Dream Idol Festival has dominated the popularity of each idol group at Yumenosaki Academy. To restore Valkyrie's original status, Shu decides to have them enter the next Dream Idol Festival. During their performance, the electricity is suddenly shut off. However, Mika continues singing, prompting them to join in and saving their performance. As Fine, led by Eichi, go to perform, the stage returns to normal, causing Valkyrie to realize that they had been sabotaged. Shu goes into a mental breakdown and Valkyrie goes on a permanent hiatus. During the next school year, Wataru, another member of the Five Eccentrics, advises Nazuna to form Ra*bits with other freshmen who had been rejected from other idol groups. In present time, Nazuna warns Subaru and Anzu about how dangerous Eichi is.
7	"Emperor"; Transliteration: "Kōtei" (Japanese: 皇帝)	August 18, 2019
In present time, Trickstar gains popularity following Akatsuki's defeat at the S1. Eichi proposes that Trickstar should disband at the height of their fame in order to have their members explore their full potential in other groups, with Subaru and Hokuto assigned to join Fine, Mao to Akatsuki, and Makoto to Knights. Despite initial resistance, Mao suggests they do so as they watch Fine perform. At the end of the performance, Eichi invites all of Yumenosaki Academy's idol groups to participate in the next Dream Idol Festival against idols from other schools.
8	"Rift"; Transliteration: "Kiretsu" (Japanese: 亀裂)	August 25, 2019
The members of Trickstar must decide on whether to fully disband in preparation of the Dream Idol Festival. Subaru is scouted to join Ryuseitai, but he decides he wants to continue with Trickstar. With Ryuseitai's support, Anzu helps by acting as a stand-in member to help Trickstar qualify for the Dream Idol Festival. As the event begins, Subaru and Anzu are scheduled to battle Knights. Upon noticing Izumi and Makoto are not present, Subaru goes to look for them.
9	"Counterattack"; Transliteration: "Hangeki" (Japanese: 反撃)	September 1, 2019
Izumi locks Makoto in the practice room, and when Subaru confronts him, Makoto tricks Izumi into opening the door by pretending to bruise his face. Meanwhile, Keito advises Mao to do what he believes to be the right choice. Once Subaru returns with Makoto, they find that Mao has rejoined Trickstar and defeated Knights with Anzu's help.
10	"Element (Part 1)"; Transliteration: "Eremento 〜Zenpen〜" (Japanese: エレメント 〜前編〜)	September 8, 2019
11	"Element (Part 2)"; Transliteration: "Eremento 〜Kōhen〜" (Japanese: エレメント 〜後編〜)	September 15, 2019
12	"Decision"; Transliteration: "Ketchaku" (Japanese: 決着)	September 22, 2019
13	"Supernova"; Transliteration: "Sūpānova" (Japanese: スーパーノヴァ)	October 9, 2019
Chiaki works to develop a new proposal for RYUSEITAI to perform at a theme park.
14	"Tanabata (Part 1)"; Transliteration: "Tanabata 〜Zenpen〜" (Japanese: 七夕祭 〜前編〜)	October 13, 2019
Eichi asks Anzu to start a new project, and Switch works toward their debut.
15	"Tanabata (Part 2)"; Transliteration: "Tanabata 〜Kōhen〜" (Japanese: 七夕祭 〜後編〜)	October 20, 2019
Preparations for the Tanabata Festival are underway, and Eichi approaches Valkyrie about entering this DreFes.
16	"Summer Concert (Part 1)"; Transliteration: "Samā Raibu 〜Zenpen〜" (Japanese: サマーライブ 〜前編〜)	October 27, 2019
Trickstar meets students from their rival school, Reimei Academy, to get ready for the upcoming Summer Live.
17	"Summer Concert (Part 2)"; Transliteration: "Samā Raibu 〜Kōhen〜" (Japanese: サマーライブ 〜後編〜)	November 3, 2019
18	"Judgment"; Transliteration: "Jajjimento" (Japanese: ジャッジメント)	November 10, 2019
19	"Autumn Live (Part 1)"; Transliteration: "Ōtamu Raibu 〜Zenpen〜" (Japanese: オータムライブ 〜前編〜)	November 17, 2019
20	"Autumn Live (Part 2)"; Transliteration: "Ōtamu Raibu 〜Kōhen〜" (Japanese: オータムライブ 〜後編〜)	November 24, 2019
21	"Halloween Party"; Transliteration: "Harouin Pāti" (Japanese: ハロウィンパーティ)	December 1, 2019
22	"Starlight Festival"; Transliteration: "Sutāraito Fesutibaru" (Japanese: スターライトフェスティバル)	December 8, 2019
The groups at Yumenosaki Academy compete in the winter S1, the Starlight Festival.
23	"Effort"; Transliteration: "Doryoku" (Japanese: 努力)	December 15, 2019
24	"Miracle"; Transliteration: "Kiseki" (Japanese: 奇跡)	December 22, 2019

==== Ensemble Stars!! Recollection Selection: Element episode list ====
No.	Title	Original release date
1	"Wizard Memory"	April 6, 2023
2	"Wave Crest"	April 7, 2023
3	"Wandering"	April 8, 2023
4	"Wuthering Heights"	April 9, 2023
5	"Wish"	April 10, 2023
6	"Blackbird"	April 11, 2023

Ensemble Stars!! Recollection Selection: Crossroad (Episode List)

No.	Title	Original release date
1	"Concern"	November 10, 2023
2	"Chaos"	November 11, 2023
3	"Confidence"	November 12, 2023
4	"Curse"	November 13, 2023
5	"Crowd"	November 14, 2023
6	"Cross"	November 15, 2023

Ensemble Stars!! Recollection Selection: Checkmate (Episode List)

No.	Title	Original release date
1	"Broken Branch Tip"	March 10, 2024
2	"A Dark Grey Sky"	March 11, 2024
3	"Killer's Anthem"	March 12, 2024
4	"Rusting Heart"	March 13, 2024
5	"The Solitary Throne"	March 14, 2024
6	"The Crown's Radiance"	March 15, 2024

=== Film ===
The series received a compilation film titled Ensemble Stars!! Road to Show!!, which premiered on March 4, 2022. It featured 10 idol characters already featured in the game (Mao Isara, Makoto Yuuki, Aira Shiratori, Mayoi Ayase, Nagisa Ran, Hinata Aoi, Kohaku Oukawa, Rei Sakuma, Izumi Sena, Ritsu Sakuma) as well as the player character Anzu. It also featured Mitsunari Samejima, a new character specific to the film. Masakazu Hishida directed the film at David Production, with Asami Nakatani serving as chief director, Seitarō Kino writing the scripts, Haruko Iizuka designing the characters and serving as chief animation director, and Tatsuya Katō composing the film's music. BukuSuta The World, a series of animated shorts based on Bkub Okawa's parody manga Ensembukubu Stars!, also were screened in theaters with Road to Show!!

== Reception ==
By March 2016, over 1.5 million users downloaded the game.

By July 2023, over 16 million users downloaded the game.
