= Bowsette =

Fan-made version of Nintendo's Bowser

- The first appearance of Bowsette (right) in a comic by Ayyk92
- First appearance: "Super Crown" (September 19, 2018)
- Created by: Ayyk92
- Based on: Bowser and Princess Peach by Shigeru Miyamoto

In-universe information
- Species: Koopa

Bowsette (/baʊˈzɛt/) is a fan-made, moe anthropomorphized and gender-swapped version of the Mario franchise character Bowser, in which he is transformed by the Super Crown power-up to resemble the franchise character Princess Peach. The character was originally created on 19 September 2018 by Ayyk92, a Malaysian online artist, as part of a comic strip which he posted to Twitter. Bowsette subsequently became an Internet meme and rose in popularity internationally, with related hashtags in English and Japanese trending on Twitter; several professional Japanese artists contributed their own renditions of the character on the website, referring to the character as Princess Koopa (Japanese: クッパ姫, romanized: Kuppa-hime).

Bowsette is typically portrayed as a blonde woman with horns, fangs, a spiked collar with matching armbands and a black strapless dress, essentially combining Princess Peach with elements of Bowser's appearance. Journalists took notice of the trend and were surprised by its longevity, attributing it to various aspects such as the character's appearance and appeal or the possible desire by fans to shock Nintendo's social media handlers. While some noted much of the art that spawned from it was solely pornographic, others were quick to emphasize that some had a wholesome tone instead. Bowsette's rapid popularity led to other fan-made characters in a similar vein in a short timespan, each based on an existing Nintendo character. In Japan, concerns were raised about the legality of fan-made characters under Japan's copyright law.

== Background ==
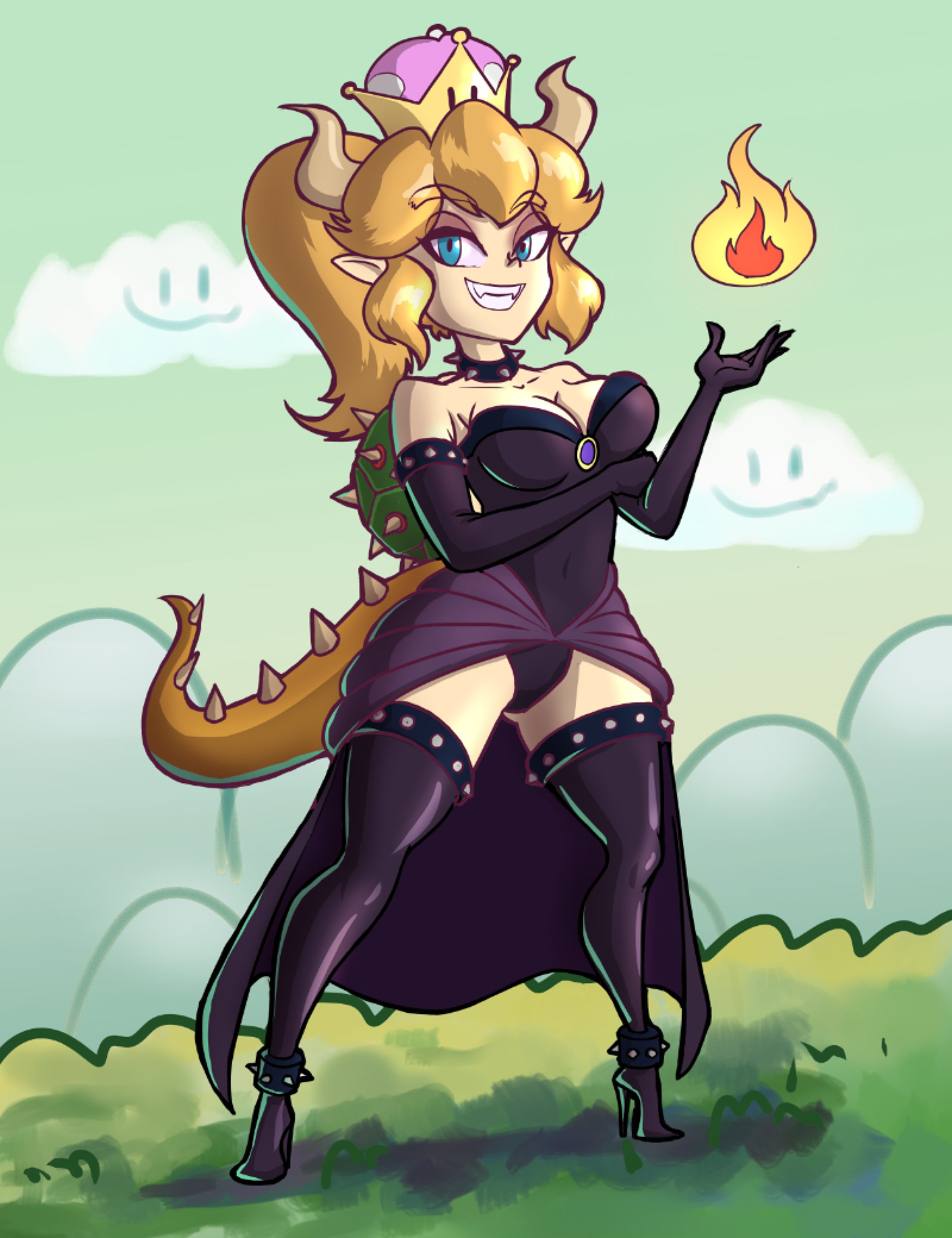
Some fan renditions of the character have added additional details from Bowser's design, such as a spiked tail.

Created by Nintendo in 1985, Super Mario is a long running series of platform games. The series primarily revolves around the protagonist, Mario and other playable characters, such as his brother Luigi, rescuing the kidnapped princess Princess Peach from the primary antagonist, Bowser. As the player progresses, they can gather in-game power-up items that let the player character gain new abilities or forms. During a prerecorded Nintendo Direct presentation broadcast in September 2018, Nintendo showcased a trailer for their 'Deluxe' re-release of New Super Mario Bros. U for the Nintendo Switch, which featured their character Toadette as a new playable option, and a new power-up exclusively for her, the Super Crown. When picked up, it would transform Toadette into "Peachette", a form that resembled Princess Peach but with Toadette's hairstyle and other distinctive features.

The unveiling of Peachette led to speculation and theories by fans over how the Super Crown item operates within the game's universe. Shortly after, artist Ayyk92 posted a four-panel webcomic on DeviantArt and Twitter with the caption "The Super Crown's some spicy new Mario lore". In the comic, Mario and Bowser are shown disheartened after their simultaneous marriage proposals to Peach are rejected, referencing the ending of Super Mario Odyssey. However, while Mario consoles him, Bowser reveals that he is holding the Super Crown power-up, and in the last panel, the two are shown walking past Peach and Luigi, who were playing tennis, with Bowser now transformed into a female character resembling Peach but with a black strapless dress, fangs, large horns protruding from the sides of her head, and Bowser's spiked attire and shell.

Unnamed in the original comic, the character was dubbed "Bowsette" by English-speaking fans. A related hashtag quickly trended on Twitter, amassing over 150,000 mentions and fan art shortly after, with some renders giving the character darker skin and/or red hair as a callback to the original Bowser. Pornhub and YouPorn each reported a dramatic increase in searches for the character on their websites by 500,000 and 2900%, respectively, and by the end of 2018 was the 9th most searched term on the site with 34.6 million searches. The character also trended among Japanese Twitter users under the name Koopa-hime (transl. "Princess Koopa"), with several major Japanese artists contributing their own art of the character. These artists included Street Fighter and Darkstalkers character designer Akira Yasuda, One-Punch Man manga artist Yusuke Murata, Pop Team Epic series creator Bkub Okawa and Miss Kobayashi's Dragon Maid series creator Coolkyousinnjya. An event dedicated to the character titled "Project Crown" was also planned for 27 October, featuring fan art and crossdressing cosplay. In 2018, pornographic production company Wood Rocket produced a porn parody titled "Wetter Than A Water Level: The Bowsette Porn Parody" based on the meme with April O'Neil as Bowsette and Tommy Pistol as Mario.

== Reception ==
In their "Nintendo Voice Chat" segment, several IGN writers spoke at length about the phenomenon, with Brian Altano describing it as "people have latched onto something and made ... a randy or impure version of something that is historically known as pure", and attributing part of the appeal in how it would confuse Nintendo's social media handlers. Casey DeFreitas disagreed, attributing some of the character's popularity to the "monster girl" trend in Japan while also noting several of the fan comics for the character were actually wholesome, but criticizing the name as not following the naming convention established by Peachette's name. Kotaku's Gita Jackson noted the overabundance of art for the character, stating that she was "overwhelmed by how strongly Bowsette has taken root in video game fandom". In a video with Tim Rogers, she added that she had never seen a trend "hit Twitter this hard", and noted the heavy Japanese support both for the character and original artist. Alex Olney of Nintendo Life noted his surprise at the trend's longevity, reasoning that the juxtaposition of something "edgy and sexy" to the Mario setting but also fitting within the narrative Nintendo has created might be the reason as why that is the case.

Don Nero of Esquire described the character as "dominatrix-inspired", proposing that the character could be seen as a positive symbol of female empowerment along the likes of Samus Aran or Lara Croft, though complained that a bulk of the art was "overtly male-gazey, dripping with horrendously over-the-top, seam-bursting cliches that call to mind the bodacious sex-dolls of Dead or Alive Volleyball". Ars Technica's Sam Machkovech attributed some of the character's popularity to how it contrasted against Peach, stating the fan art's focus on a "more muscular, less svelte figure [...] lets Peach look a little less Barbie-proportioned". Nick Valdez of ComicBook.com described the character as combining "the cutesy elements of Peach's design with the harder edges and spiky tail of Bowser, making the amalgam of the two characters a delightful artist prompt for fans", though cautioned about the explicit nature of some of the fan art. Ana Valens of The Daily Dot noted the character's broad appeal, but also as a relatable figure for trans women, stating, "Bowsette is exactly how we see ourselves: We went from self-hating, gender dysphoric creatures and turned into happy and confident women". Scholar Jennessa Hester argued a similar interpretation, noting that "despite not being tied to any visible LGBTQ representation within" the game it originated from, the Super Crown power-up "functioned for many players as a distinctly transgender video game mechanic," leading to Bowsette's status as a trans icon.

Bowsette's popularity led to fans exploring concepts of other characters changed by the power-up into figures resembling Peach, including Super Mario character King Boo transformed into "Boosette" or "Booette", which also saw a great deal of fan art. Zachary Ryan of IGN noted that with all the different artists, it had moved beyond merely being the concept of "what if Bowser was a girl?". He added that "so many artists that you wouldn't know get to flex a little muscle", being able to show works they had created in a similar vein. Fairy Tail creator Hiro Mashima weighed in with reverse-gender versions of their characters as well: he voiced caution for participants in the trend "to be careful not to cause trouble for copyright holders and companies that they are contracted to", and noted that even if he wanted to draw fan art, he would need the approval of publishers and other related parties. Other Japanese news outlets more directly discussed the legality of such characters under copyright law, specifically Bowsette, and whether they infringed on Nintendo's own copyright.

Despite fan petitions to make the character canon, Nintendo did not comment on it, stating "Concerning the drawings and other things uploaded to the Internet, we have no comment". Additionally, according to the website of New Super Mario Bros. U Deluxe, the crown would only affect Toadette. However, gaming publications noticed a similarity between the character and an unused concept for Super Mario Odyssey shown in the artbook, where Bowser took over Peach's body similarly to Mario's capture ability in Odyssey, and she inherited several of his features from the possession, questioning whether Nintendo would now explore the concept further. Alex Olney stated that it would be unlikely that Nintendo would add the character to a game at some point. However, he did expect to see Nintendo interact with the trend in some fashion, adding "I think it would be a fun little thing and Nintendo are being a lot more fun recently". Despite not creating the character themselves, Nintendo also saw a dramatic increase in their stock market value after Bowsette's debut, exceeding the rise from their previous Nintendo Direct presentation.

Newsweek and Know Your Meme named it one of the "Top 10 Video Game Memes of 2018", stating that "Fandomization of Bowsette was not only inevitable, but obligatory", and adding that while previous renditions of a female Bowser existed online, Bowsette's design was "something new". The Daily Dot cited it as an example of how "people embraced being horny on Twitter" in 2018, stating that "very nature of the meme—a powerful, masculine villain becoming a buff, domineering woman—fascinated users with transformation and feminization fetishes", and that the character's non-normative appearance added to the appeal, namely with queer women. Metro named it one of the "12 Biggest Video Game Stories of 2018", calling it "an easy winner for the most unlikely video game story of the year" and noting its popularity both with Nintendo fans and online porn search results, further adding "It's probably best not to ask". The meme also placed 16th on Japan's Twitter Trend Awards, earning a special "Steering Committee Special Award" due to its rapid growth. Ayyk92 later received a physical trophy from Pixiv and Niconico for the award.

== See also ==
- List of Internet phenomena
- List of unofficial Mario media – Unofficial media based on the Mario franchise
- Rule 63 – Technique in fiction
