= Bkub Okawa =

Japanese manga artist (born 1986)

- 大川ぶくぶ
- Born: October 3, 1986 (age 39); Japan
- Other name: Fuminbain (フミンバイン)
- Occupations: Illustrator; manga artist
- Years active: 2008–present

YouTube information
- Channel: Miyakko Kuso Chūnen
- Years active: 2021–present
- Genre: Let's Play
- Subscribers: 44.9 thousand
- Views: 3.09 million
- Last updated: September 4, 2024

Bkub Okawa (Japanese: 大川ぶくぶ, Hepburn: Ōkawa Bukubu; born October 3, 1986) is a Japanese illustrator and manga artist. With his work consisting of 4-panel comics, Okawa debuted professionally in 2008 with the manga series Super Elegant and rose to popularity with his 2014 series Pop Team Epic. Okawa is also a regular contributing artist for the Ensemble Stars! media franchise.

== Career ==
Prior to making his commercial debut, Okawa drew dojinshi under the circle name Fuminbain, and continued to do so throughout most of his professional career. In 2008, he entered the 8th Dengeki Comic Grand Prix, where his comic 3LDKM won the Shōnen Manga Division Excellence Prize. Later that year, he released his first series, Super Elegant, through Dengeki G's Festival! Comic. In addition to drawing manga, as a contributor, Okawa regularly collaborates with other franchises such as Ensemble Stars! and King of Prism.

On October 3, 2021, Okawa launched a YouTube channel to celebrate his 35th birthday. He later debuted as a VTuber on June 21, 2022, using a model designed by Nekosuke Okogemaru and sold on the resource website Nizima.

=== Copyright violations ===
Okawa's Twitter account was temporarily suspended on June 8, 2018. After his account was reinstated, Okawa stated that the reason for the suspension was due to copyright infringement from a drawing he posted of MS-09B Dom from Mobile Suit Gundam; however, some online commenters have discussed that the suspension may have been a result of a coordinated attack from his detractors or from flippant death threats Okawa had made towards Lawson.

On October 4, 2018, manga artist Buichi Terasawa accused Okawa of copyright infringement over a collaboration sweatshirt from Pop Team Epic and fashion brand Candy Stripper. The sweatshirt had parodied Terasawa's manga series Cobra and directly referenced the series in its product description. Okawa posted an apology, while the sweatshirt was removed from sale.

== Personal life ==
On April 30, 2022, Okawa announced through Twitter that he had gotten married. Prior to this, he and his wife had been living together since 2020.

== Works ==
=== As creator ===
Year	Title	Website/Magazine	Notes
2008	Super Elegant (スーパーエレガント)	Dengeki G's Festival! Comic	
2012	Mission Impossible (ミッソンインパッセボーゥ)	Manga Life Win	
2014	Duckmanthurium (ダックマンスリウム)	comicAnthurium (comicアンスリウム)	
2014	Pop Team Epic (ポプテピピック)	Manga Life Win	
2014	Bonnou-chan (ぼんのうちゃん)	Bonnou Festival 48/108 Official Website	
2015	Risubokkuri (リスボックリ)	Comic Gum	
2016	Hoshiiro Girldrop (☆色ガールドロップ)	Manga Life Win	Gag start to Pop Team Epic Volume 2, later received an anthology book in 2018, served as gag start to Pop Team Epic Volume 7
2016	Honey Come Chatka!! (ハニカムチャッカ！！)	Twitter 4-koma	
2016	Extreme Kitaku-bu (エクストリーム帰宅部)	The Caligula Effect Official Blog	
2016	Hyper Ultra Girlish (ハイパーウルトラガーリッシュ)	Dengeki Maoh	Sequel to Super Elegant.
2016	Hachinai Gaiden Senryoku-gai! Katato-chan (ハチナイ外伝 戦力外！カタトちゃん)	Cinderella Nine Official Website	Gag parody of Cinderella Nine
2016	IP Police Tsuduki-chan (IPポリス つづきちゃん)	Yatate Bunko	Gag parody of various Sunrise properties
2016	Kon'ya wa Neko-chan (今夜は猫ちゃん)	Monthly Morning two	
2017	Neo Naon Universe (ネオナオンユニバース)	Feel Young	
2017	GOHO Mafia! Kajita-kun (GOHOマフィア! 梶田くん)	Dengeki G's Magazine.com	Co-authored with Japanese personality Mafia Kajita.
2017	WIXOSS Bkub Tama Gekijo (ウィクロス ぶくぶタマ劇場)	CoroCoro Aniki	
2017	Ensembukubu Stars! (あんさんぶくぶスターズ！)	Dengeki Online	Gag parody of Ensemble Stars!
2017	Ienikaeru Made ga Ragnarok desu. (家に帰るまでがラグナロクです。)	Valkyrie Anatomia Official Website	Gag parody of Valkyrie Anatomia
2018	Okawa Bkub no o Nikki sa Sete Itadaku. (大川ぶくぶのお日記させていただく。)	Feel Young	
2018	Hana to Yume to Kuso Manga Gekijo to Hana (花とゆめとクソまんが劇場と花)	The Hana to Yume	
2019	Poputan (ぽぷたん)	Manga Life Win	Gag start to Pop Team Epic Volume 5
2020	Ensembukubu Stars!! (あんさんぶくぶスターズ！！)	Dengeki Online	Gag parody of Ensemble Stars!, sequel to Ensembukubu Stars!
2021	Touhou Futakoma Gensokyo (東方フタコマ幻想郷)	Touhou Danmaku Kagura Official Website	
2023	Okawa Bkub no Kuso Manga Dojo (大川ぶくぶのクソ漫画道場)	Dengeki Maoh	
2023	Yappari Chinchirando (やっぱりチンチランド)	Dengeki Daioh	

=== As contributor ===
Year	Title	Notes
2014	Sword Art Online Comic Anthology 2 (メイドインアビス公式アンソロジー 度し難き探窟家たち)	
2014	Comic Market 86 Edition! Ai-Mai-Mi Official Anthology Comic (ソードアート・オンライン コミックアンソロジー2)	
2016	Fate/Grand Order Anthology Comic: Star (Fate/Grand Order アンソロジーコミック STAR)	
2016	King of Prism by Pretty Rhythm Comic Anthology (KING OF PRISM by PrettyRhythm コミックアンソロジー)	
2017	Made in Abyss Official Anthology - Layer 1: Irredeemable Cave Raiders (メイドインアビス公式アンソロジー 度し難き探窟家たち)	
2018	Hoshiiro Girldrop Comic Anthology (星色ガールドロップ コミックアンソロジー)	
