= Gender flip =

Technique in fiction

A gender swap, also called a gender flip or genderbend, is a technique in fiction in which a character is portrayed as a different gender from the one in which they were originally written. It is commonly used in remakes or reboots, and in the body swap and isekai genres.

In Internet culture, the concept is usually known as Rule 63 ("for every character there is a gender swapped version of that character").

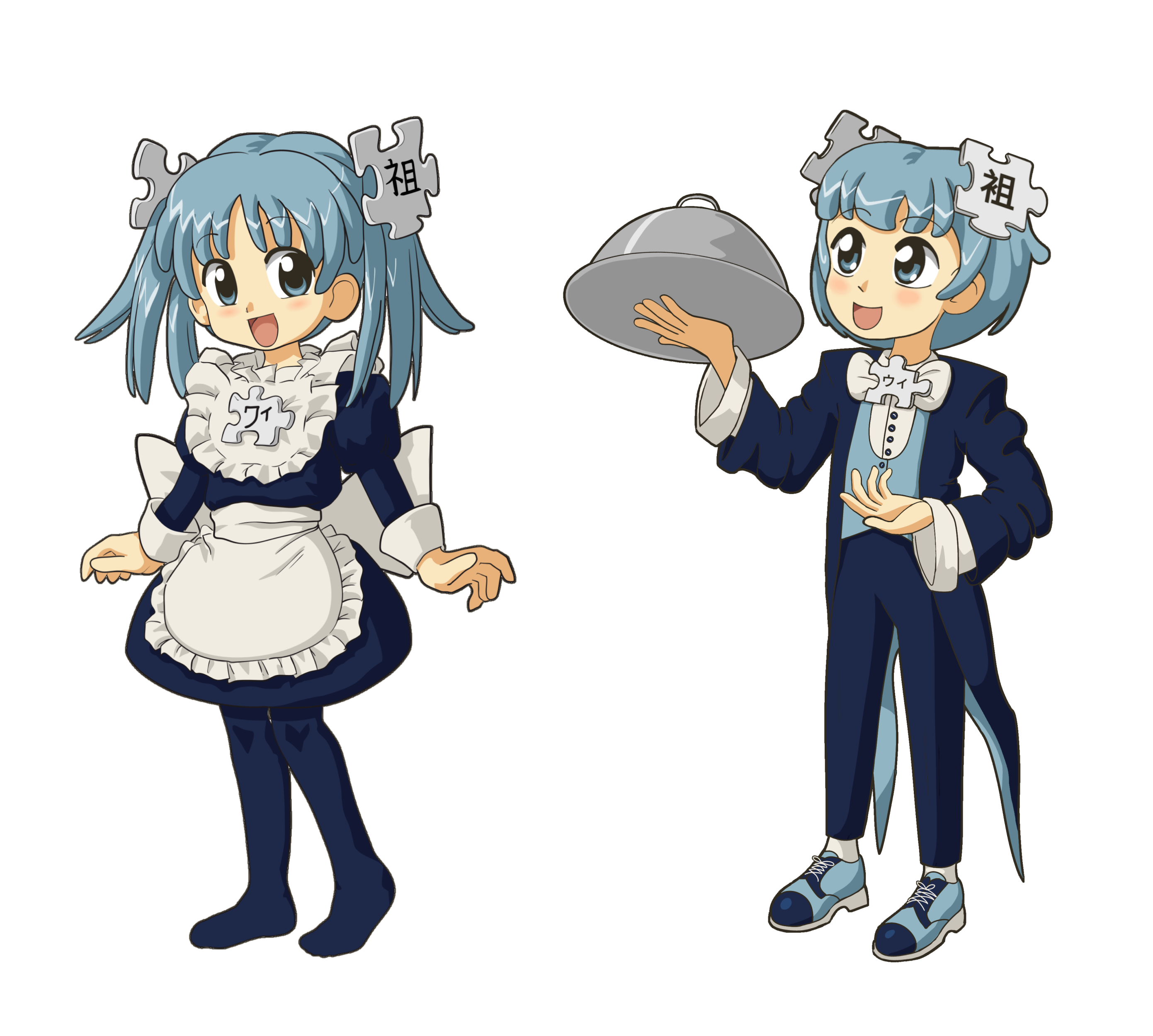
Wikipe-tan (left) alongside a fan-made gender swapped counterpart (right)

== History ==
Despite the prominence of the idea in films of the 2010s, the concept dates from much earlier. Radio Times critic Emma Simmonds gives the example of 1939's His Girl Friday, adapted from 1928 Broadway play The Front Page, in which the gender of character Hildy Johnson is switched from male to female.

== Criticism ==
According to The Guardian, one of the most high profile examples of this is the 2016 remake of the 1984 film Ghostbusters, which featured a female ensemble instead of the original film's male one. The 2016 version received significant backlash, with its trailer video becoming the most disliked in YouTube history. David Sims wrote in The Atlantic that the subtext of much of the criticism of the film was that "the idea of a female cast taking up the mantle of a very male film series is just somehow wrong", and the response has elsewhere been described as sexist and misogynistic. The website Vox described it as "a sequel to Gamergate".

In 2018, Amanda Hess wrote in The New York Times that in the two years since the Ghostbusters remake, this concept had progressed from being a "one-off stunt" into a genre of its own, citing Ocean's 8 as just one example of three such films that summer alone. Other 2010s examples include Overboard, The Hustle, and Life of the Party.

Emine Saner, writing in The Guardian, said that the phenomenon of gender-swap reboots seems like a positive, as it leads to more women in blockbuster films, but may have downsides, such as being a safe place for studios to use female talent without taking a risk on original female-centric stories.

== In other media ==
The gender swap technique is also used in media other than film. The 2024 concept album Warriors, based on a 1979 action film, took inspiration from Gamergate to reimagine the story's central gang as women. Lin-Manuel Miranda has said that the gender swap was central to him being able to write a compelling narrative for his adaptation. The album's co-writer, Eisa Davis, characterized the flip as a revolutionary and a feminist act, given the film's overtones she described as "misogynist" and "homophobic".

The term has also been used in the context of Japanese video game Fate franchise. Numerous characters in that universe (which debuted with the 2004 game Fate/Stay Night) are based on historical figures, but with their genders flipped from male to female; for example Attila, King Arthur (Artoria), Frankenstein's monster, Francis Drake, Jack the Ripper, Miyamoto Musashi, Mordred and Nero are portrayed as female. These portrayals reflect both the franchise's interest in reinterpreting historical narratives and broader trends within contemporary shōnen anime toward greater prominence of female heroic characters, situated the practice within longer anime traditions of gender ambiguity and gender transformation. David John Boyd interprets the phenomenon through the lens of gender theory and anime aesthetics. He argues that Type-Moon's reimagining of historical figures as anime girls constitutes a form of "shōjo-ification" of history, in which well-known historical personages are transformed into emotionally expressive heroines whose identities challenge conventional historical narratives. Many of these characters have become more popular online than their original, often obscure, historical versions.

== Rule 63 ==
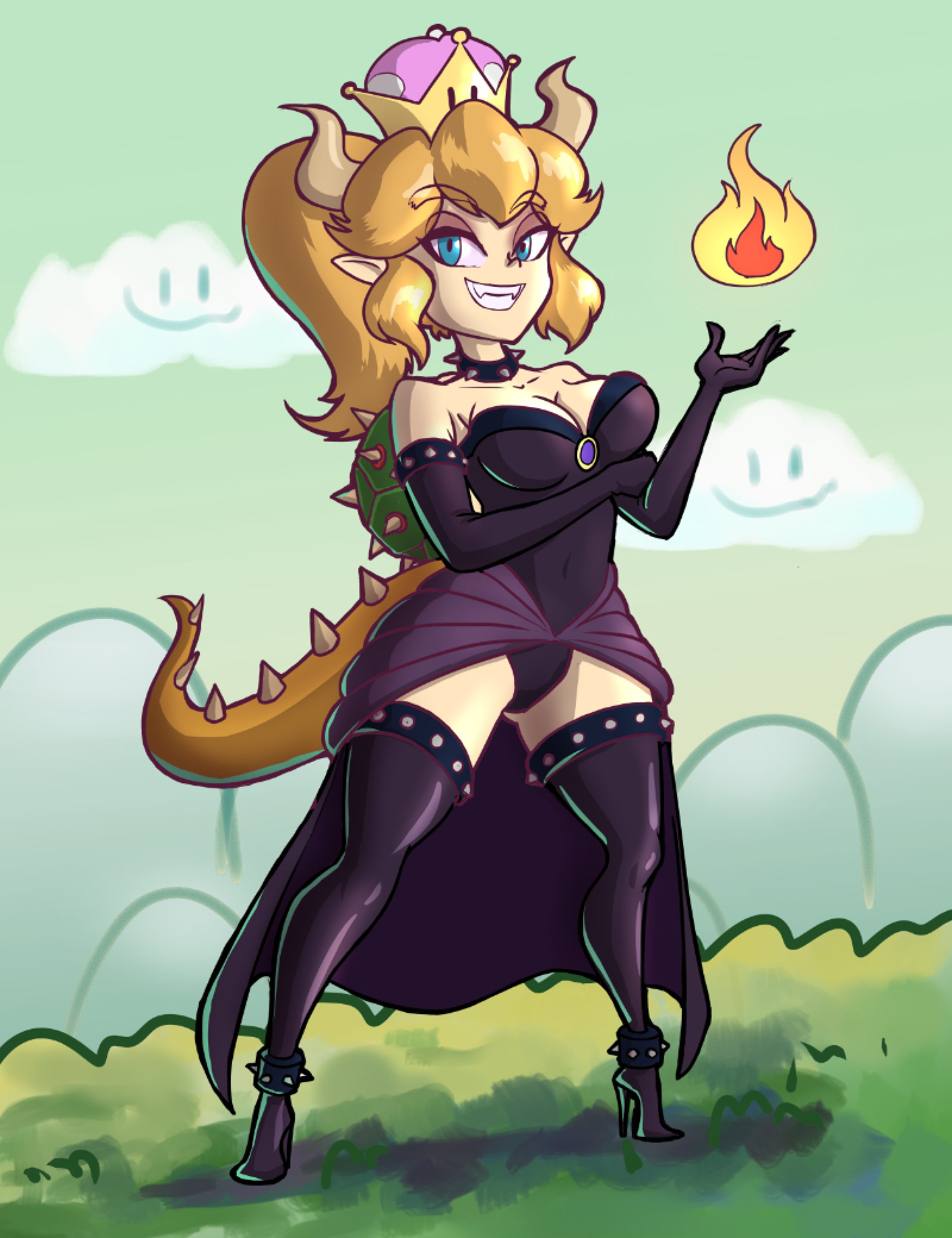
An example of rule 63: Bowsette, which is the female form of Bowser, a fictional character from the Mario franchise

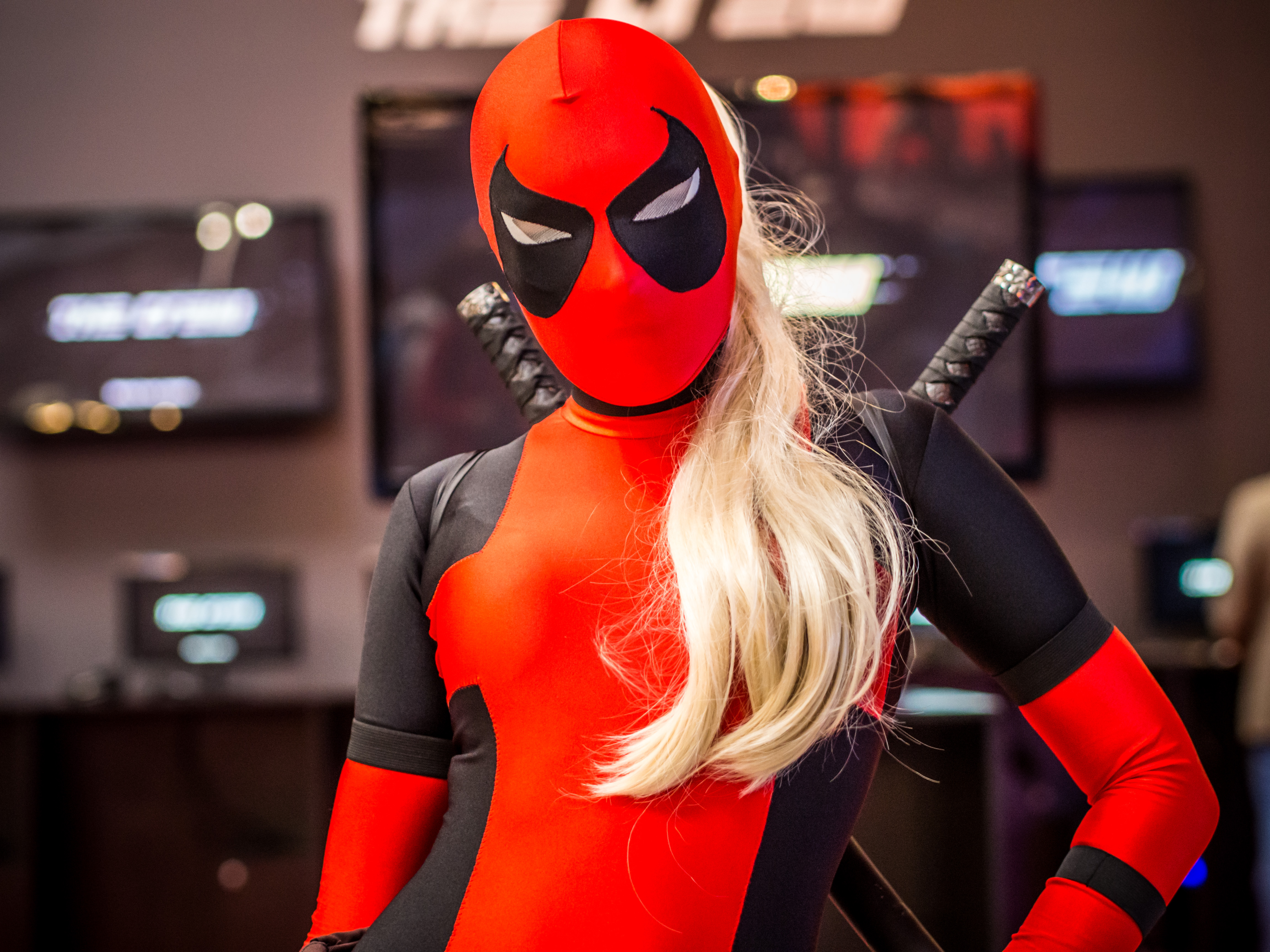
Cosplay of Lady Deadpool, a gender flipped alternate reality version of the character Deadpool

Rule 63 is an Internet meme that states that, as a rule, "for every character there is a gender swapped version of that character". It is one of the "Rules of the Internet" that began in 2006 as a Netiquette guide on 4chan and were eventually expanded upon by including deliberately mocking rules, of which Rule 63 is an example. It began to see general use in fandom communities as a term to refer to both fan-made and official gender flips of existing fictional characters.

=== Origin ===
Prior to the creation of Rule 63, gender flipping was popularized in video games in the 1990s by one of the moves of Darkstalkers character Demitri Maximoff, a vampire. Called Midnight Bliss, it involves him approaching his opponent while holding a rose. If successful, he turns them into a helpless maiden and drains them of their blood, which affects their life energy in-game. This meant that female versions of all the game's male characters had to be created, as well as those of Street Fighter and SNK characters when SNK vs. Capcom included Maximoff. These female interpretations became popular and resulted in large amounts of fan art, as well as prompting art of gender-swaps of other male and female characters.

Rule 63 was created in mid-2007 as an addition to the humorous "Rules of the Internet", originally created around the end of 2006 on 4chan. It lists two statements:

1. "for every given male character, there is a female version of that character", and
2. "for every given female character, there is a male version of that character".

The trope, originally seen primarily unofficially, later became more widely disseminated in popular culture, with critics stating that it had been "recognized by Hollywood".

=== Usage ===
Rule 63 is commonly used as a term to refer to gender-swapped interpretations of existing characters in fanworks, such as fan art, fan fiction and cosplay, and is particularly pervasive in the anime and manga community, where communities sprang up built around romantic gender-swap relationships. It also often overlaps with the creation of moe anthropomorphic female versions of non-human, male characters. A well-known example of this is Bowsette, a female version of the Mario antagonist Bowser that became one of the most popular Internet memes of 2018. Bowsette is created through the use of the Super Crown, a power-up that imparts the appearance and abilities of Princess Peach on its user. Nintendo's official clarification is that the item is only usable by Toadette, and the creation of Bowsette is "technically impossible".

This term was also used by critics to refer to official characters who are gender-swapped versions of older characters or fictional beings, such as Number Six from Battlestar Galactica being a "sexy female" version of a Cylon Centurion, and the female main cast of the 2016 reboot of Ghostbusters.

The creation of Rule 63 cosplays such as gender-swapped superheroes has been cited as popular among female cosplayers as giving them the ability to portray roles beyond socially approved gendered scripts. It is seen as empowering, allowing cosplayers to wear clothing and weapons usually not afforded to female characters. Certain characters with inherent gender fluidity, however, are said to work better than others. Such gender-bending cosplay, which allows the cosplayer to choose what behavior enhances the performance, can be contrasted with crossplay, which completely immerses the cosplayer in the codes of another gender.

== See also ==
- Cross-gender acting, when actors or actresses portray a character of the opposite sex.
- Rule 34
