= Harry Potter video games =

Licensed video games based on the Harry Potter novels

- Compilation of four PC games released with the Harry Potter license
- Creator: J. K. Rowling
- Platforms: Windows; macOS; PlayStation; PlayStation 2; PlayStation 3; PlayStation 4; PlayStation 5; PlayStation Portable; PlayStation Vita; Xbox; Xbox 360; Xbox One; Xbox Series X/S; Game Boy Color; Game Boy Advance; GameCube; Wii; Nintendo DS; Nintendo 3DS; Nintendo Switch; Nintendo Switch 2; Android; iOS; Mobile phones
- First release: Lego Creator: Harry Potter; 1 November 2001
- Latest release: Harry Potter: Quidditch Champions; 3 September 2024
- Parent series: Wizarding World

The Harry Potter video games are a series of video games based on the Harry Potter novel and film series originally created by English author J. K. Rowling. Many of the Harry Potter-inspired video games are tie-ins to the film adaptations of the same name. There are multiple distinct versions for individual games.

After the success of the initial games, Warner Bros. Games expanded the series to include a pair of Lego video games and created the label Portkey Games. The games have sold over 98 million units, and grossed over $1.5 billion in video game sales (Note: Harry Potter video games: Up until 2014 – $1.5 billion.) and an additional $1 billion in mobile game sales; the main series received mixed reviews from critics, while the Lego games were both critically and commercially successful. Hogwarts Legacy, the latest release, has made $850 million in its first two weeks post-launch.

== Development ==
Despite the games having a wide variety of developers, Electronic Arts developed all games from Harry Potter and the Goblet of Fire until Harry Potter and the Deathly Hallows – Part 2.

=== Novel adaptations ===
Release timeline
2001	Harry Potter and the Philosopher's Stone (PlayStation)
2001	Harry Potter and the Philosopher's Stone (PC)
2001	Harry Potter and the Philosopher's Stone (GBA)
2001	Harry Potter and the Philosopher's Stone (GBC)
2002	Harry Potter and the Chamber of Secrets
2003	Harry Potter and the Philosopher's Stone (Note: The first console release of Harry Potter and the Philosopher's Stone was developed by Argonaut Games and released in 2001. An entirely new game was developed by Warthog Games and released in 2003.)
2004	Harry Potter and the Prisoner of Azkaban
2005	Harry Potter and the Goblet of Fire
2006
2007	Harry Potter and the Order of the Phoenix
2008
2009	Harry Potter and the Half-Blood Prince
2010	Harry Potter and the Deathly Hallows – Part 1
2011	Harry Potter and the Deathly Hallows – Part 2

Generally, the video game adaptations of the Harry Potter series were designed to be released to coincide with the release schedule of the film series. The first instalment in the series, Harry Potter and the Philosopher's Stone, (Note: Known as Harry Potter and the Sorcerer's Stone for the North American release.) received four different versions for different consoles: the PlayStation version was developed by Argonaut Games; KnowWonder developed the Windows version, with Aspyr creating a port for the Mac OS; and Griptonite Games developed the Game Boy Advance and Game Boy Color versions. Two years later, Warthog Games released versions for sixth generation consoles (GameCube, PlayStation 2, and Xbox). The version was released after the Harry Potter and the Chamber of Secrets, and used many of the same assets. The game featured puzzles aimed at "eight- to fourteen-year-olds" and aimed to capture the mood of the novel of the same name.

During the release of Harry Potter and the Chamber of Secrets in 2002, developer Eurocom was brought on board to create the sixth-generation console releases (GameCube, PlayStation 2 and Xbox) as well as the Game Boy Advance and the Game Boy Color release. This version included new assets specifically for the Chamber of Secrets and free-roam flying on a broomstick on the PlayStation 2 release, which was not possible on any other release. This version removed many of the puzzle sections found in the first game and replaced them with action sections and boss fights. The PC version, however, used many of the same assets as those in Philosopher's Stone, and retained a more puzzle-oriented gameplay style.

In 2004, Harry Potter and the Prisoner of Azkaban was released. The third instalment featured separate games for the PC version and a console release (which was this time developed by EA UK). Both of these versions made Harry, Hermione and Ron playable characters. In the PC release, Buckbeak and Hedwig were made playable as well. GameSpot likened the Game Boy Advance version of the game to Chrono Trigger and Pokémon.

In the Goblet of Fire, players can play multiplayer, as all three protagonists.

In 2005, the PC compilation World of Harry Potter was released, containing the first three novel games and the Quiddich World Cup game. Following Prisoner of Azkaban, EA, specifically EA UK (which was later renamed as EA Bright Light), took charge of creating all versions of the game. The PC and Mac releases were developed as ports of the console release. In Harry Potter and the Goblet of Fire (2005), the style from previous titles was reduced to a more linear, level-based system, as the character followed certain scenes from the film. Multiplayer components were factored into the game's release: up to three players from the same console. This was also the first game in the series to be released on Nintendo DS.

During the development of Harry Potter and the Order of the Phoenix (2007), the development team had more interaction with author J. K. Rowling when attempting to create playable card games for the series. The rules that were created were later revealed to be the official rules in canon. This release was the first in the series to include motion capture from actors in the film series, including Rupert Grint and Evanna Lynch. The release removed the multiplayer component of the previous two games; Fred and George Weasley were still playable, but only in certain locations. The game made a return to the free-roaming style of earlier games.

In 2009, Harry Potter and the Half-Blood Prince was released after originally being planned for 2008. It was pushed back six months to be released with the film of the same name. Like with the previous game, the multiplayer component was removed; Ron and Ginny Weasley were still playable, but only in certain locations. The final two games in the main series, Harry Potter and the Deathly Hallows – Part 1 (2010) and Part 2 (2011), take place away from Hogwarts, and features locations such as the Ministry of Magic. These games use a stealth and combat mechanic similar to those found in modern first-person shooters. Jonathan Bunney, head of Production at EA Bright Light, stated that the final two instalments would be "darker and more action-oriented game(s)."

=== Other ===
Release timeline
2001	Lego Creator: Harry Potter
2002	Lego Creator: Harry Potter and the Chamber of Secrets
2003	Harry Potter: Quidditch World Cup
2004
2005	Harry Potter: Find Scabbers
2006–2007
2008	Harry Potter: Mastering Magic
2009
2010	Lego Harry Potter: Years 1–4
2011	Lego Harry Potter: Years 5–7
2012	Harry Potter for Kinect
2012	Book of Spells
2013	Book of Potions
2014–2017
2018	Harry Potter: Hogwarts Mystery
2019	Harry Potter: Wizards Unite
2020	Harry Potter: Puzzles & Spells
2021	Harry Potter: Magic Awakened
2022
2023	Hogwarts Legacy
2024	Harry Potter: Quidditch Champions

The first retail release of a Harry Potter game outside of the film adaptations was for the Lego Creator, released in 2001 as Lego Creator: Harry Potter and the sequel, Creator: Harry Potter and the Chamber of Secrets, released in 2002. Following the release of Chamber of Secrets, EA Games engaged game developer Magic Pockets, who created the Game Boy Advance version, to produce a video game based on Quidditch.

Due to the release schedule of the film Harry Potter and the Prisoner of Azkaban, there was no main series release in 2003. Instead, Harry Potter: Quidditch World Cup was released in its place. Previous games had featured Quidditch but only focused on Potter as the Seeker; Quidditch World Cup puts players in control of the team's Chasers and the rest of the team's players via mini-games. The game featured both matches played at Hogwarts, and matches played internationally.

In 2010, following a release of a special Potter-themed Lego set, Lego Harry Potter, Traveller's Tales announced that a Lego Harry Potter video game would be released, similar to releases for Lego Indiana Jones: The Original Adventures and Lego Star Wars: The Complete Saga. The series was split into two: Lego Harry Potter: Years 1–4 was released in 2010 followed by Lego Harry Potter: Years 5–7 in 2011.

In 2012 and 2013, three augmented reality games were created, titled Harry Potter for Kinect, Book of Spells and Book of Potions respectively. The first was released for the Xbox 360 and used the Kinect. The latter two were both released for PlayStation 3 and used the PlayStation Move controller as well as the Wonderbook accessory for the PlayStation Eye. The Wonderbook accessory was brought out in conjuncture with Book of Spells, allowing players to see an augmented reality version of real life books.

In 2017, two new themed character packs for a Toys-to-life console video game Lego Dimensions were released. One contained Lego figurines of Harry, Voldemort, mini Ford Anglia and mini Hogwarts Express, while the other one contained figurines of Hermione and Buckbeak. At the same time, Portkey Games partnered with Jam City to release Harry Potter: Hogwarts Mystery in March 2018 for iOS and Android. The game was a spin off from the Harry Potter universe by setting the game before the book series, but still at Hogwarts. The game featured similar components to those of other freemium games, such as wait timers, and microtransactions.

Following the release of Pokémon Go, in 2019 Niantic announced Harry Potter: Wizards Unite, a similar augmented reality game. The game allowed players to see the game world through a smartphone.

In 2020, Harry Potter: Puzzles & Spells by Zynga Inc. was released on App Store, Google Play, Amazon Kindle, and Facebook Gaming in 14 languages.

Hogwarts Legacy, an open-world, action role-playing video game and a prequel to the Harry Potter books, was released on February 10, 2023.

On April 17, 2023, it was announced that a new game, Harry Potter: Quidditch Champions, was in active development by Unbroken Studios. The game allows players to compete either in a single-player career mode, akin to a traditional sports game, or in multiplayer matches. A limited playtest was held in April of that year, with a full release in September 2024. A Nintendo Switch version was released in November of that year.

The collectible card game Harry Potter: Magic Awakened initially launched in China and Taiwan on September 9, 2021, followed by a worldwide launch on June 27, 2023. The game's American, European, and Oceanian servers were shut down for undisclosed reasons in October 2024.

== Gameplay ==
In the novel video games, gameplay is featured around puzzle solving with some action-oriented scenes. Releases in the series generally followed the plot of the associated novel. The protagonist learns spells or other techniques from classes within Hogwarts school, which are often used to solve the puzzles at hand. While some are similar to those used in other Harry Potter media (such as "Wingardium Leviosa", used for levitating objects), other spells are unique to the video games (such as "Flipendo", described as the "knockback jinx", an attacking spell, used to push objects, or "Spongify", to make an object turn into a bounce pad).

Earlier games in the series contained "secrets" which were a countable list of hidden extras. The games contained "beans", based on "Bertie Botts every flavour beans", used as currency, and Famous Witch or Wizard cards, used as collectables. However, in later games (specifically the final two entries), entries employ first person shooter and stealth sections.

== Releases ==
=== List of console, handheld and PC games ===
Year	Title	Platform(s)			Acquired label(s)
Year	Title	Console	Computer	Handheld	Acquired label(s)
2001	Lego Creator: Harry Potter	—N/a	Windows	—N/a	—N/a
2001	Harry Potter and the Philosopher's Stone	PlayStation	—N/a	—N/a	PlayStation Greatest Hits
2001	Harry Potter and the Philosopher's Stone	—N/a	Windows; macOS	—N/a	—N/a
2001	Harry Potter and the Philosopher's Stone	—N/a	—N/a	Game Boy Advance	—N/a
2001	Harry Potter and the Philosopher's Stone	—N/a	—N/a	Game Boy Color	—N/a
2002	Harry Potter and the Chamber of Secrets	PlayStation; PlayStation 2; Xbox; GameCube	Windows; macOS	Game Boy Color; Game Boy Advance	PlayStation 2 Greatest Hits, Platinum; Xbox Platinum Family Hits; GameCube Player's Choice
2002	Lego Creator: Harry Potter and the Chamber of Secrets	—N/a	Windows	—N/a	—N/a
2003	Harry Potter: Quidditch World Cup	PlayStation 2; Xbox; GameCube	Windows	Game Boy Advance	PlayStation 2 Greatest Hits, Platinum; Xbox Platinum Family Hits; GameCube Player's Choice
2003	Harry Potter and the Philosopher's Stone	PlayStation 2; Xbox; GameCube	—N/a	—N/a	—N/a
2004	Harry Potter and the Prisoner of Azkaban	PlayStation 2; Xbox; GameCube	Windows	Game Boy Advance	PlayStation 2 Greatest Hits, Platinum; Xbox Platinum Family Hits; GameCube Player's Choice
2005	Harry Potter and the Goblet of Fire	PlayStation 2; Xbox; GameCube	Windows	Game Boy Advance; Nintendo DS; PlayStation Portable	PlayStation 2 Greatest Hits, Platinum; PlayStation Portable Platinum, Essentials
2007	Harry Potter and the Order of the Phoenix	PlayStation 2; PlayStation 3; Xbox 360; Wii	Windows; macOS	Game Boy Advance; Nintendo DS; PlayStation Portable	PlayStation 2 Platinum; PlayStation Portable Platinum, Essentials
2009	Harry Potter and the Half-Blood Prince	PlayStation 2; PlayStation 3; Xbox 360; Wii	Windows; macOS	Nintendo DS; PlayStation Portable	PlayStation Portable Platinum, Essentials
2010	Lego Harry Potter: Years 1–4	PlayStation 3; PlayStation 4; Xbox 360; Xbox One; Wii; Nintendo Switch	Windows; macOS	Nintendo DS; PlayStation Portable	PlayStation 3 Essentials; PlayStation Portable Essentials
2010	Harry Potter and the Deathly Hallows – Part 1	PlayStation 3; Xbox 360; Wii	Windows	Nintendo DS	—N/a
2011	Harry Potter and the Deathly Hallows – Part 2	PlayStation 3; Xbox 360; Wii	Windows	Nintendo DS	—N/a
2011	Lego Harry Potter: Years 5–7	PlayStation 3; PlayStation 4; Xbox 360; Xbox One; Wii; Nintendo Switch	Windows; macOS	Nintendo DS; PlayStation Portable; Nintendo 3DS; PlayStation Vita	PlayStation 3 Essentials; PlayStation Portable Essentials
2012	Harry Potter for Kinect	Xbox 360	—N/a	—N/a	—N/a
2012	Book of Spells	PlayStation 3	—N/a	—N/a	—N/a
2013	Book of Potions	PlayStation 3	—N/a	—N/a	—N/a
2023	Hogwarts Legacy	PlayStation 4; PlayStation 5; Xbox One; Xbox Series X/S; Nintendo Switch; Nintendo Switch 2	Windows	—N/a	—N/a
2024	Harry Potter: Quidditch Champions	PlayStation 4; PlayStation 5; Xbox One; Xbox Series X/S; Nintendo Switch	Windows	—N/a	—N/a

=== List of mobile games ===
Title	Year	Publisher	Developer	Platforms	Metacritic score
Harry Potter: Find Scabbers	2005	Warner Bros. Digital Distribution	Handheld Games	Mobile phone	N/A
Harry Potter and the Order of the Phoenix	2007	EA Mobile	EA Romania	Mobile phone	N/A
Harry Potter: Mastering Magic	2007	EA Mobile	EA Romania	Mobile phone	N/A
Harry Potter and the Half-Blood Prince	2009	EA Mobile	EA Romania	Mobile phone	N/A
Harry Potter and the Deathly Hallows – Part 1	2010	EA Mobile	EA Romania	Mobile phone	N/A
Lego Harry Potter: Years 1–4	2010	Warner Bros. Interactive Entertainment	TT Fusion	iOS; Android	87
Harry Potter and the Deathly Hallows – Part 2	2011	Gameloft	Gameloft Chengdu	Mobile phone	N/A
Lego Harry Potter: Years 5–7	2012	Warner Bros. Interactive Entertainment	TT Fusion	iOS; Android	71
Harry Potter: Hogwarts Mystery	2018	Jam City	Jam City	iOS; Android	43
Harry Potter: Wizards Unite	2019	Portkey Games	Niantic; WB Games San Francisco	iOS; Android	64
Harry Potter: Puzzles & Spells	2019	Zynga	Zynga	iOS; Android; Amazon Kindle; Facebook	70
Harry Potter: Magic Awakened	2021	NetEase	Zen Studio	iOS; Android	78

== Reception ==
=== Sales ===
Title	Number of Units Sold (millions)
Harry Potter and the Philosopher's Stone	11.91
Harry Potter and the Chamber of Secrets	7.28
Harry Potter: Quidditch World Cup	1.88
Harry Potter and the Prisoner of Azkaban	2.15
Harry Potter and the Goblet of Fire	2.34
Harry Potter Collection (PS2)	0.56
Harry Potter and the Order of the Phoenix	2.52
Harry Potter and the Half-Blood Prince	3.22
Lego Harry Potter: Years 1–4	8.46
Harry Potter and the Deathly Hallows – Part 1	1.89
Harry Potter and the Deathly Hallows – Part 2	1.31
Lego Harry Potter: Years 5–7	5.02
Book of Spells	0.66
Lego Harry Potter Collection	1.43
Hogwarts Legacy	40
Total	98.77 (Note: 40 million up to 2007, 58.77 million since 2007.)

=== Critical response ===
==== Film adaptations ====
Aggregate review scores
Game	Metacritic
Harry Potter and the Philosopher's Stone	56–65%: (GBA) 64/100 (GameCube) 62/100 (PC) 65/100 (PS) 64/100 (PS2) 56/100 (XBOX) 59/100
Harry Potter and the Chamber of Secrets	71–77%: (GBA) 76/100 (GameCube) 77/100 (PC) 77/100 (PS2) 71/100 (XBOX) 77/100
Harry Potter and the Prisoner of Azkaban	67–70%: (PS2) 70/100 (GBA) 69/100 (GameCube) 67/100 (PC) 67/100 (XBOX) 67/100
Harry Potter and the Goblet of Fire	68–71%: (DS) 68/100 (GBA) 71/100 (GameCube) 69/100 (PC) 66/100 (PS2) 68/100 (PSP) 70/100 (XBOX) 68/100
Harry Potter and the Order of the Phoenix	51–68%: (DS) 51/100 (GBA) 50/100 (PC) 63/100 (PS2) 61/100 (PS3) 67/100 (PSP) 52/100 (Wii) 69/100 (X360) 68/100
Harry Potter and the Half-Blood Prince	48–66%: (DS) 48/100 (PC) 64/100 (PS2) 65/100 (PS3) 66/100 (PSP) 51/100 (Wii) 60/100 (X360) 64/100
Harry Potter and the Deathly Hallows – Part 1	37–56%: (DS) 56/100 (Wii) 41/100 (X360) 38/100 (PS3) 38/100 (PC) 37/100
Harry Potter and the Deathly Hallows – Part 2	43–55%: (DS) 55/100 (Wii) 47/100 (X360) 44/100 (PS3) 43/100 (PC) 43/100

The Harry Potter video game series received mixed reviews from critics. Nintendo consoles (specifically the Wii) scored higher marks than other console releases. According to media review site Metacritic, the series received its best response for the Chamber of Secrets game. Despite the game being created differently for different systems, the game was rated higher on consoles across the board against every other entry in the series.

The series was judged on its representation of the novel and film series. Detroit Free Press gave the Goblet of Fire GameCube version four out of four stars and said, "this is a masterful video game because it can be enjoyed on many levels. Younger players can simply explore this graphically rich Harry Potter world and succeed. Older players will enjoy manipulating the magic by choosing spells and skills and casting magic together with friends." However, The Sydney Morning Herald gave the game three out of five stars and stated that the series highlight "is a brief but thrilling broomstick chase against a fire-breathing dragon. An underwater interlude is less successful, although it provides variety." Frank Provo of GameSpot was very positive about the Prisoner of Azkaban GBA game's recreation of the novel; saying "The main thing to keep in mind is that Prisoner of Azkaban on the GBA offers a fun way for Harry Potter fans to step into the shoes of their favorite wizard-in-training and experience firsthand everything that happened in the third instalment of the series." Gerald Villoria of GameSpot praised the developer's efforts, for the PlayStation version, in re-creating the Hogwarts Castle and different-looking characters but said that despite the graphics being like "extremely jagged polygons."

Later entries in the series received increasingly lower scores on Metacritic, with Deathly Hallows – Part 1 being the worst rated. The magazine X-ONE (then known as X360) stated that there was "so much wrong with this game that we don't have space to list it all". Kristine Steimer of IGN scored the game a 2 out of 10, writing that the developers "failed to create anything worthy of the Harry Potter branding".

==== Other games ====
Aggregate review scores
Game	Metacritic
Harry Potter: Quidditch World Cup	53–69%: (PC) 69/100 (XBOX) 69/100 (GC) 68/100 (PS2) 68/100 (GBA) 53/100
Lego Harry Potter: Years 1–4	79–87%: (PS3) 79/100 (PC) 79/100 (XBOX) 79/100 (iOS) 87/100
Lego Harry Potter: Years 5–7	64–80%: (X360) 77/100 (PS3) 76/100 (PC) 80/100 (Wii) 76/100 (DS) 69/100 (3DS) 71/100 (Vita) 64/100 (iOS) 71/100
Harry Potter for Kinect	54%
Book of Spells	72%
Book of Potions	60%
Harry Potter: Hogwarts Mystery	43%
Harry Potter: Puzzles & Spells	70%

Other games based around Harry Potter have been generally praised better than the novel adaptions, especially the Lego Harry Potter games. Lego Harry Potter: Years 1-4 specifically scored well: Metacritic scored the game at 79%, for its PC, PlayStation 3, and Xbox release. Greg Miller of IGN praised the game for its "gorgeous environments, clever use of the famed spells, legitimate humor and adorable references" and called it a "love letter to fans of the Boy Who Lived." The Official Nintendo Magazine gave the Wii and DS version 80%, saying that it was "one of the best Harry Potter games ever", however it lacked originality compared to previous Lego video games.

Besides the Lego Harry Potter titles, two titles were released for the PlayStation 3, using augmented reality. Book of Potions and Book of Spells both built for the Wonderbook, received mixed reviews from critics. They criticized the game's short length, but commended use of the augmented reality within the games. Alex Simmons of IGN commented that Book of Spells was "shallow and rarely compelling", but called the technology behind it "fantastic". Harry Potter: Hogwarts Mystery, also released in 2018, received media backlash for its use of microtransactions, despite the game being free to play. David Jagnaeux from IGN Africa reviewed the game, but called it "awful", and the "gratuitous" microtransactions "actively prevented" him from enjoying the game.

=== Awards ===
In 2002, Harry Potter and the Philosopher's Stone was nominated for three D.I.C.E. Awards in the "Console Family", "Original Musical Composition" and "PC Family" categories. Lego Harry Potter: Years 1–4 won the Kotaku "best adapted game" award in 2010, with Brian Crecente proclaiming it to be the "Best Lego Game to Date." The game was nominated for two awards in the 7th British Academy Games Awards, in the "family" and "handheld" sections. In addition, it was nominated for "Best Adapted Video Game" for the Spike Video Game Awards in 2010. The musical score of Harry Potter and the Chamber of Secrets by Jeremy Soule received a BAFTA Award for Original Music in 2004.

Harry Potter and the Half-Blood Prince received a BAFTA nomination in 2010 for James Hannigan's music score, and won an International Film Music Critics Association (IFMCA) Award for best video game score in 2009. Book of Spells received a nomination for "game innovation" at the BAFTA Awards in 2013. As of 2014, the Harry Potter video game series was stated to have sold $1.5 billion in sales.
