= Mafalda Luís de Castro =

Portuguese actress

- Born: Mafalda Martins da Silva Luís de Castro; August 12, 1989 (age 36); Lisbon, Portugal
- Other names: Mafalda de Castro
- Occupation: Actress

Mafalda Martins da Silva Luís de Castro (Mafalda Luís de Castro or just Mafalda de Castro for short) (born 12 August 1989) is a Portuguese actress who acts out on Portuguese television programs that air on TVI and a few on SIC. She is also a voice actress, who voiced, and dubbed characters in European Portuguese, mostly young and/or royal female characters.

She is the official European Portuguese dub-over artist for British actress, Emma Watson, since she voiced her role as Hermione Granger throughout the Harry Potter films and the video game adaptations.

== Filmography ==
=== Television ===
She is an actress on CMTV's soap opera "Someone Lost" playing Leonor Mascarenhas.

=== Voice Roles ===
==== Video games ====
- Harry Potter and the Philosopher's Stone (video game) - Hermione Granger
- Harry Potter and the Chamber of Secrets (video game) - Hermione Granger
- Harry Potter and the Prisoner of Azkaban (video game) - Hermione Granger
- Harry Potter and the Goblet of Fire (video game) - Hermione Granger
- Harry Potter and the Order of the Phoenix (video game) - Hermione Granger
- Harry Potter and the Half-Blood Prince (video game) - Hermione Granger
- Harry Potter and the Deathly Hallows – Part 1 (video game) - Hermione Granger
- Harry Potter and the Deathly Hallows – Part 2 (video game) - Hermione Granger

== Dubbing Roles ==
=== Live Action Films ===
- Harry Potter and the Philosopher's Stone (film) - Hermione Granger (Emma Watson)
- Harry Potter and the Chamber of Secrets (film) - Hermione Granger (Emma Watson)
- Harry Potter and the Prisoner of Azkaban (film) - Hermione Granger (Emma Watson)
- Harry Potter and the Goblet of Fire (film) - Hermione Granger (Emma Watson)
- The Wild Soccer Bunch - Vanessa (Sarah Kim Gries)
- Mirror Mirror - Snow White (Lily Collins)

=== Animated films ===
- Barbie as the Island Princess -
- The Tale of Despereaux - Princess Pea (replacing Emma Watson's voice)
- Battle for Terra -
- Hop - Samantha "Sam" O'Hare (replacing Kaley Cuoco's voice) (Live action and Animation)
- The Smurfs - One of the Smurf characters (Live action and Animation)
- Arthur Christmas -

=== Animated Series ===
- Kitty Is Not a Cat - Kitty (Roslyn Oades) (Lauren Tom)
