= Harry Potter and the Philosopher's Stone (disambiguation) =

Harry Potter and the Philosopher's Stone is a novel by J. K. Rowling.

Harry Potter and the Philosopher's Stone may also refer to:

- Harry Potter and the Philosopher's Stone (film), the novel's film adaptation
- Harry Potter and the Philosopher's Stone (soundtrack), the soundtrack based on the film, composed by John Williams
- One of a number of video games based on the film:
  - Harry Potter and the Philosopher's Stone (PlayStation video game), a 2001 game
  - Harry Potter and the Philosopher's Stone (PC video game), a 2001 game
  - Harry Potter and the Philosopher's Stone (GBA video game), a 2001 game
  - Harry Potter and the Philosopher's Stone (GBC video game), a 2001 game
  - Harry Potter and the Philosopher's Stone (2003 video game), a GameCube, PlayStation 2, and Xbox game
- Harry Potter (TV series), with the first season named after the first book
