= Harry Potter and the Philosopher's Stone (2003 video game) =

2003 action-adventure video game

- European PlayStation 2 cover art
- Developer: Warthog Games
- Publisher: Electronic Arts
- Composer: Jeremy Soule
- Series: Harry Potter
- Platforms: GameCube; PlayStation 2; Xbox
- Release: WW: 12 December 2003
- Genre: Action-adventure
- Mode: Single-player

Harry Potter and the Philosopher's Stone (released in the United States as Harry Potter and the Sorcerer's Stone) is an action-adventure video game based on the 2001 film of the same name. Developed by Warthog Games and released in December 2003 for the GameCube, PlayStation 2, and Xbox, it is the second set of games to have this title following a release of the same name in 2001.

The story follows protagonist Harry Potter, who, after discovering he is a wizard, is sent to Hogwarts School of Witchcraft and Wizardry where he makes friends and receives magical training, and along with his friends stops Lord Voldemort from returning to power. The game received mixed reviews. Critics praised the game for its voice acting and accessible gameplay, but criticized its camera, unimpressive graphics and inconsistent framerate.

== Gameplay ==
The player controls the character Harry Potter from a third-person perspective.

Two years after the release of Harry Potter and the Philosopher's Stone on the PlayStation, a new version of the game for sixth-generation consoles was developed by Warthog Games and released in 2003. Its gameplay differed greatly from the other version and followed the film far more closely, though it was criticised for reusing assets from Harry Potter and the Chamber of Secrets, released the year prior.

== Plot ==
Rubeus Hagrid, a mysterious giant, leaves an orphaned Harry Potter, whose parents were murdered by the evil Lord Voldemort, on the front door step of his bullying relatives, the Dursleys. For ten years, Harry has lived with the Dursleys, not knowing that he is a wizard, and famous in the wizarding world for being the only one to survive the attacks of Voldemort, whose name no one dares to say. Harry receives a letter inviting him to attend Hogwarts School of Witchcraft and Wizardry and is told who he really is. After buying his school supplies at Diagon Alley, he boards the Hogwarts Express on platform 9¾ with the other students. Once they arrive at Hogwarts, the students are sorted into houses: Gryffindor, Hufflepuff, Ravenclaw and Slytherin. Harry is sorted into Gryffindor, after pleading with the Sorting Hat, a talking witch's hat, not to place him in Slytherin, notorious for being the house of darker witches and wizards, as well as Lord Voldemort. Once sorted, Harry meets Ron Weasley, a poor boy from a large, pure-blood, wizarding family and Hermione Granger, a witch born to Muggle parents.

At school, Harry begins his training as a wizard and learns more about his past. After retrieving a remembrall while riding on a broomstick, for his classmate Neville Longbottom, Harry is appointed seeker of the Gryffindor Quidditch team.

Harry, Ron and Hermione believe that one of their teachers, Professor Snape, is planning to steal the Philosopher's Stone, a magical object which grants the user immortality, and set out to stop him. The three face a series of obstacles that protect the stone, including a three-head dog, surviving a deadly plant, catching a flying key, playing a life-sized game of Chess and choosing the correct potion to get through a magical fire. Harry, now alone, expects to face Snape but instead finds Professor Quirrell, the Defence Against the Dark Arts teacher. Quirrell removes his turban and reveals that Voldemort was living on the back of his head. Harry retrieves the stone and Voldemort tries to get it from him but touching him burns Quirrell's skin. Harry passes out from the struggle of the battle.

He awakens in the school's hospital wing with Professor Dumbledore, the headmaster, by his side. Dumbledore explains that the stone has been destroyed but that its loss will not stop Voldemort from returning. He reassures Harry that if their battles do no more than slow Voldemort's return then he may never come back.

During the end-of-year feast, Gryffindor wins the House Cup. Harry sees it as the best evening of his life and one that he will never forget.

== Development ==
A new Philosopher's Stone game was initially rumoured in June 2003 for sixth-generation consoles. It was officially confirmed in July 2003 that EA was developing a new game for the GameCube, PlayStation 2 and Xbox consoles based on the game engine from Harry Potter and the Chamber of Secrets released in 2002.

This new game was developed by Warthog Games and set out to fix some of the problems encountered in Chamber of Secrets such as loading times. The game uses similar character and location designs as the Chamber of Secrets game and the previous generation consoles by making them 3D.

== Reception ==
=== Critical response ===
Reception

Aggregate scores
Aggregator	Score		
Aggregator	GameCube	PS2	Xbox
GameRankings	63.31%	57.90%	61.82%
Metacritic	62/100	56/100	59/100

Review scores
Publication	Score		
Publication	GameCube	PS2	Xbox
Famitsu	24/40	24/40	N/A
Game Informer	N/A	5/10	N/A
GamePro	N/A	3.5/5	N/A
GameRevolution	D+	D+	D+
GameSpot	6.1/10	6.1/10	6.1/10
GameSpy	2/5	2/5	2/5
GameZone	7/10	6.3/10	8/10
IGN	6.4/10	6.4/10	6.4/10
Nintendo Power	4/5	N/A	N/A
Official U.S. PlayStation Magazine	N/A	1.5/5	N/A
Official Xbox Magazine (US)	N/A	N/A	6.2/10

The PlayStation 2, GameCube, and Xbox versions of Harry Potter and the Philosopher's Stone received mixed reviews from critics, according to the review aggregator platform Metacritic, the GameCube version of the game received an average score of 62 out of 100, the PlayStation 2 version an average score of 56 out of 100, and the Xbox version an average score of 59 out of 100.

Worth Playing said the voice acting was "probably the game's best aural aspect", as the actors "deliver their lines in a believable and fitting style." IGN found the voice dialogue to be "well acted and very crisp." GamePro said the game was "more interactive and enjoyable" than the PlayStation version.

Computer and Video Games commented on Hogwarts saying it is a "curiously flat experience, and not helped by the chronically jerky frame rate." X-Play said the game's camera angles were "the worst offender ... It's a maddening and uncooperative system." Soundtrack Geek's Jon Blough identified Jeremy Soule's music for the soundtrack as too short. He also added that "the menacing and relaxing cues [in the music] fail[ed] to provide anything definitive." GameZone observed the tasks and quests and stated they ... aren't as compelling [as Chamber of Secrets], and the puzzles seem a little lacking." In Japan, Famitsu gave the GameCube and PlayStation 2 versions a score of all four sixes for a total of 24 out of 40.

=== Awards ===
Both versions of the game received multiple nominations. The sixth generation versions received a nomination for a Golden Joystick Award in 2003 for "MTV Film Adaptation of the Year" but lost to The Lord of the Rings: The Two Towers.
