= Ginny Weasley =

Character in J. K. Rowling's Harry Potter series

- Harry Potter character
- Bonnie Wright as Ginny Weasley (Note: Promotional image for Harry Potter and the Half-Blood Prince (film) (2009))
- First appearance: Harry Potter and the Philosopher's Stone (1997)
- Created by: J. K. Rowling
- Portrayed by: Bonnie Wright (films); Gracie Cochrane (series; season 1); Bonnie Hill (series; season 2)
- Voiced by: Bumble Clarke; Shreya Lallu; Claire-Louise Cordwell

In-universe information
- Full name: Ginevra Molly Weasley
- Nickname: Ginny
- Family: Arthur Weasley (father); Molly Weasley (mother); Bill Weasley (brother); Charlie Weasley (brother); Percy Weasley (brother); Fred Weasley (brother); George Weasley (brother); Ron Weasley (brother)
- Spouse: Harry Potter
- Children: James Sirius Potter; Albus Severus Potter; Lily Luna Potter
- Nationality: British
- House: Gryffindor
- Born: 11 August 1981

Ginevra "Ginny" Weasley is a fictional character in the Harry Potter series of novels by J. K. Rowling. She is introduced in the first novel, Harry Potter and the Philosopher's Stone, as the youngest child and only daughter of Arthur and Molly Weasley. She becomes romantically involved with Harry Potter and eventually marries him. Ginny is portrayed by Bonnie Wright in all eight Harry Potter films, while in the upcoming Harry Potter television series she will be portrayed by Gracie Cochrane in the first season, and by Bonnie Hill in the second season.

== Creation and development ==
In a 2005 interview, Rowling said Ginny is terrified of Harry when she first meets him, because she perceives him as a "rock god". Rowling hoped readers would gradually discover, over the course of the series, that Ginny is "pretty much the ideal girl for Harry". Rowling described Ginny as tough, gutsy, warm, compassionate and funny, and said these are qualities that Harry needs in his ideal woman. She said Harry requires a romantic partner who can "stand the demands of being with Harry Potter, because he's a scary boyfriend ... He's a marked man." Rowling said Ginny had to experience "a big emotional journey" before she could begin a romance with Harry. In the sixth novel, Harry Potter and the Half-Blood Prince, Rowling attempted to depict Ginny and Harry as "total equals" and "worthy of each other". Rowling also described Ginny as a "gifted witch".

== Appearances ==
=== Novels ===
Ginny is introduced in Harry Potter and the Philosopher's Stone (1997) when Harry Potter encounters the Weasley family at King's Cross station. She is ten years old at this time. When Ginny realizes who Harry is, she wants to board the Hogwarts Express to see him, but her mother will not allow it.

Ginny begins her first year at the wizard school Hogwarts in Harry Potter and the Chamber of Secrets (1998). She joins Gryffindor House and develops a crush on Harry. On Valentine's day, she sends a singing Valentine to him "inconspicuously". As the plot advances, Harry and Ginny's brother Ron notice that she is acting strangely. At first, they assume she is simply disturbed by the attacks on Muggle-born students at Hogwarts, but soon suspect that she may know something about the attacks. They question her, but she refuses to speak. They eventually discover that she opened the Chamber of Secrets and was commanding a Basilisk to assault students (not knowing she started the attacks), while under the influence of Tom Riddle's school diary. Harry finds Ginny, saves her from Riddle, and destroys the diary with the basilk's poisoned tooth that was in his arm.

Ginny returns in Harry Potter and the Prisoner of Azkaban (1999). She is a second-year student at Hogwarts, and is present when Harry is attacked by Dementors on the Hogwarts Express. During the course of the novel, she develops a closer relationship with Hermione Granger, one of Harry's best friends.

In Harry Potter and the Goblet of Fire (2000), Ginny attends the Quidditch World Cup with her father, brothers, Harry, and Hermione. She accompanies Neville Longbottom to the Yule Ball at Hogwarts.

Ginny has a boyfriend named Michael Corner in Harry Potter and the Order of the Phoenix (2003), but she eventually breaks up with him and begins dating Dean Thomas. When Dolores Umbridge bans Harry from the Quidditch team, Ginny replaces him as the Gryffindor Seeker. She joins the secret group Dumbledore's Army and accompanies Harry to the Department of Mysteries as he attempts to rescue Sirius Black. Ginny participates in a battle inside the Ministry of Magic, but retreats from the action after breaking her ankle.

In Harry Potter and the Half-Blood Prince (2005), Professor Slughorn invites Ginny to join his "Slug Club". Ginny becomes a permanent member of the Gryffindor Quidditch team as Chaser, and substitutes for Harry as Seeker when Professor Snape puts him in detention for using Sectumsempra on Draco Malfoy, forcing Harry to miss the final match of the season against Ravenclaw. Ginny's relationship with Dean ends, and she shares her first kiss with Harry after Gryffindor wins the Quidditch Cup. Ginny and Harry start a romantic relationship, but Harry ends it after several months, fearing that his closeness with her will put her in danger.

Near the beginning of Harry Potter and the Deathly Hallows (2007), Ginny discovers that Harry, Ron and Hermione will be leaving on a quest to find Voldemort's remaining Horcruxes. She kisses Harry in her bedroom, (which Ron isn't too happy about,) and they realize they still have feelings for each other. Ginny begins her sixth year at Hogwarts, where she works with Neville and Luna Lovegood to rebuild Dumbledore's Army. She participates in the Battle of Hogwarts and is nearly struck with a Killing Curse from Bellatrix Lestrange. After this close call, Molly Weasley was outraged at this, and kills Bellatrix.

In the novel's epilogue, set nineteen years after the events of Deathly Hallows, Harry and Ginny are married and have three children: James, Albus and Lily. Rowling said that after leaving Hogwarts, Ginny joins the all-female Quidditch team Holyhead Harpies. After spending a few years as a celebrated player, she retires to become the senior Quidditch correspondent for the Daily Prophet.

=== Film adaptations ===
Ginny is portrayed by Bonnie Wright in all eight Harry Potter films. In an interview with The Telegraph, Wright said her brother encouraged her to audition because she reminded him of the character.

=== Television series ===
Ginny will be portrayed by Gracie Cochrane in the first season of the upcoming Harry Potter television series. In the second season, Ginny will be portrayed by Bonnie Hill.

=== Stage adaptions ===
In the play Harry Potter and the Cursed Child (2016), Ginny helps Harry reconcile with their son Albus Severus Potter. Her job at The Daily Prophet is briefly mentioned when Draco Malfoy accuses her of promoting suspicion against former Death Eaters. Poppy Miller portrayed Ginny in the original West End production of the play.

=== Video games ===
Ginny is voiced by Bonnie Wright in the Order of the Phoenix, Half-Blood Prince and Deathly Hallows – Part 1 video games. She is voiced by Victoire Robinson in the Chamber of Secrets game, and by Annabel Scholey in the Deathly Hallows – Part 2 game.

== Characterisation ==
Ginny has the trademark Weasley red hair and freckled complexion. She is of petite stature and has bright brown eyes like her mother. She is brave, independent, loyal, intelligent, fierce, friendly, helpful and strong. She is popular with boys and is a gifted Quidditch player. She is also skilled with the Bat-Bogey Hex. In Deathly Hallows, Harry suggests that Ginny's toughness resulted from growing up with six brothers. The writer Christopher Bell claimed that youth and rage are two of Ginny's defining characteristics. He wrote that she has "a very short fuse" and a notorious temper that often expresses itself in childish ways.
