= Harry Potter and the Philosopher's Stone (GBC video game) =

2001 role-playing video game

- Developer: Griptonite Games
- Publisher: Electronic Arts
- Director: Phil Trumbo
- Designer: Michael Humes
- Programmer: Michael Dorgan
- Artist: Mike Platteter
- Writer: Michael Humes
- Composers: Mark Yeend; Drew Cady; Ian Rodia
- Series: Harry Potter
- Platform: Game Boy Color
- Release: WW: 16 November 2001
- Genre: Role-playing
- Mode: Single-player

Harry Potter and the Philosopher's Stone (released in the United States as Harry Potter and the Sorcerer's Stone) is a 2001 role-playing video game developed by Griptonite Games and published by Electronic Arts for the Game Boy Color. Based on the 1997 novel of the same name, the player controls Harry Potter, who must navigate his first year in the Hogwarts School of Witchcraft and Wizardry and eventually confront the villainous Lord Voldemort.

The Game Boy Color version was released simultaneously with the PlayStation and Game Boy Advance versions, and had the longest development cycle of the three versions. The game received mixed reviews from critics, who praised the visuals and faithfulness to the novel, but had lukewarm reactions to the audio and criticized the standard battle system and lack of a map function.

== Gameplay ==
An example of combat in Harry Potter and the Philosopher's Stone

Harry Potter and the Philosopher's Stone is a third-person role-playing video game (RPG) in which the player controls Harry Potter, guiding him through a narrative reflecting that of the novel. Harry can move around and interact with the environment by conversing with other characters, opening doors, and collecting items.

Harry is armed with a wand with which he can combat hostile creatures by casting an assortment of spells; an encounter is initiated by making contact with a spiraling effect drifting through the environment. Initially, only two spells are at Harry's disposal, though more can be learned over time. Using spells depletes Harry's Magical Points, the cost of which is displayed next to any given spell's name. Harry can achieve victory in an encounter by using spells to deplete the stamina of all on-screen enemies and forcing them to flee. In this event, Harry is rewarded with experience points, currency in the form of silver Sickles, and occasionally an item. Equipping items can increase or decrease particular attributes in combat.

More powerful spells can be learned by collecting Famous Witches and Wizards cards and combining them in combat to create an effect. A deck of cards of the player's choosing is selected at the beginning of a new game, and additional cards can be found scattered around the environment or in the possession of other characters. Cards can be traded with other players with the use of the Game Link Cable.

== Plot ==
Harry Potter is accepted into the Hogwarts School of Witchcraft and Wizardry and equips himself at Diagon Alley. On board the Hogwarts Express, Harry befriends Ron Weasley and Hermione Granger, and is accosted by Draco Malfoy. Upon arriving at Hogwarts, Harry is sorted alongside Ron and Hermione into the Gryffindor house, where he resides and studies through the year. The houses of Hogwarts are engaged in a competition to win the House Cup upon the year's end, in which points are granted for satisfactory performance and detracted for infractions.

While wandering through the school halls one night post-curfew due to Malfoy's trickery, Harry and his friends happen upon a conversation between Professors Severus Snape and Quirinus Quirrell, which leaves the impression that Snape seeks an object known as the Philosopher's Stone. They subsequently discover a great three-headed dog, Fluffy, guarding a trapdoor. After Harry and Ron rescue Hermione from a mountain troll that had infiltrated the dormitory, they see Snape having been injured by Fluffy, and suspect that he engineered the troll attack as a diversion. They learn from groundskeeper Rubeus Hagrid that Nicolas Flamel is involved in what is kept in the trapdoor, and Hermione determines that Flamel's creation, the Philosopher's Stone, is what is being guarded. On Christmas, Harry receives his father's invisibility cloak as an anonymous gift. Using it, he wanders into an abandoned classroom that houses the Mirror of Erised, which reflects a person's deepest desire.

Harry joins Hagrid in an investigation of an attack on a unicorn in the adjacent forest. Harry encounters a figure drinking a dead unicorn's blood, whose presence causes Harry great pain. He is rescued by a centaur, who explains that the figure — Lord Voldemort — is maintaining his life by drinking unicorn blood, and seeks the eternal life granted by an elixir derived from the Philosopher's Stone. The end of final exams and headmaster Albus Dumbledore's departure present the ideal opportunity for the Stone's theft, prompting Harry, Ron and Hermione to act. Passing through the trapdoor, they traverse through obstacles put in place by the school's professors, but ultimately only Harry can proceed. In the final room, Harry is surprised to find Quirrell standing in front of the Mirror of Erised. Quirrell reveals that Snape had been trying to stop him, and that Voldemort's face has manifested upon the back of his skull. The Philosopher's Stone — placed within the Mirror by Dumbledore — materializes within Harry's pocket. A final battle between Quirrell and Harry ends with Dumbledore's last-minute intervention.

Harry awakes in the school's infirmary, where Dumbledore discloses that Voldemort is still on the loose, reveals that he gifted Harry with the invisibility cloak, and explains that Snape's resentment of Harry stems from a life debt he owes Harry's father. Harry, Hermione and Ron's courageous acts win Gryffindor the House Cup. In an alternate ending, if Gryffindor does not have enough house points, either Slytherin, Hufflepuff or Ravenclaw win the House Cup.

== Development and release ==
On 10 August 2000, Electronic Arts announced that it had acquired the video game rights to the Harry Potter franchise. The license was showcased at E3 2001, with titles for the Game Boy Color, Game Boy Advance, PlayStation, and the PC scheduled for November 2001. The Game Boy Color version of Harry Potter and the Philosopher's Stone was developed by Griptonite Games, under the creative direction of Amaze Entertainment's Phil Trumbo. The game was designed and written by Michael Humes. Michael Dorgan served as lead programmer and was assisted by Doug Schilling, Joshua Meeds, Steve Ettinger, and Steve Vallee. Mike Platteter served as lead artist, leading a team including Eric Heitman, Jerry Vorhies, and Robb Vest. The audio was created by Mark Yeend, Drew Cady, and Ian Rodia.

The Game Boy Color version, along with the Game Boy Advance and PlayStation versions, was designed with input from Harry Potter author J.K. Rowling and the producers of the film adaptation to ensure that all three versions share a consistent presentation. Although the PlayStation and Game Boy Advance versions feature the fictional sport Quidditch, Griptonite Games did not feel they could do the sport justice on the Game Boy Color, and instead included side-scrolling broomstick-flying sections. The three versions were released on 16 November 2001. The Game Boy Color version had the longest development cycle of the group.

== Reception ==
Reception

Aggregate score
Aggregator	Score
GameRankings	73%

Review scores
Publication	Score
AllGame	3.5/5
Electronic Gaming Monthly	8.5/10
GamePro	3/5
GameZone	8.5/10
IGN	7/10
Nintendo Power	18.5/25

Harry Potter and the Philosopher's Stone was met with mixed reviews upon release. Shane Bettenhausen of Electronic Gaming Monthly declared it to be one of the Game Boy Color's best RPGs. The game's faithfulness to the book was commended, with Bettenhausen promising that players would be engrossed in the story's world regardless of whether they had read the book. Hilary Goldstein of IGN, however, complained of the lack of narrative details for the benefit of those unfamiliar with the book or film. Sky Champion Silver of GamePro concurred with this sentiment, saying that a lack of familiarity with the book could make locating certain characters and objects difficult. Code Cowboy of GameZone and the reviewers of Nintendo Power regarded the title as an absorbing experience for any kind of gamer, with Code Cowboy emphasizing that his captivation was remarkable due to him not being an extensive RPG player. Sky Champion Silver, however, summarized the game as "delightful, if a little bland".

Bettenhausen found the gameplay enjoyable but familiar, describing the dungeons as a mimicry of those in Lunar: The Silver Star and the battles (as well as Harry's hopping animation upon victory) as strongly reminiscent of Final Fantasy. However, he said that the action was slowed by Harry's sluggish walking speed and awkward collision, and warned that the difficulty level may overwhelm young players. Code Cowboy was impressed by the amount of content, though he and Goldstein observed that the minigames were somewhat simple by a seasoned gamer's standards. Goldstein appreciated the gameplay variety, but considered the battle system standard for RPGs, and felt that it eventually became tedious. Scott Alan Marriott of Allgame attributed this tedium to a lack of customization, explaining that experience points could not be distributed to specific attributes upon leveling up and that the variety in equipment was limited. The lack of a map function was said to exacerbate the difficulty of navigating the vast environment of Hogwarts.

The vibrant colours and detailed characters and scenery were praised, but Code Cowboy considered the audio typical for the Game Boy Color's limitations, and said the music became mundane after a while. Marriott remarked that the music "doesn't sound very mystical", but deemed the sound effects slightly above-average. Sky Champion Silver described the music as "charming and catchy, albeit a bit monotonous".

In its debut month, Harry Potter and the Philosopher's Stone was the highest selling Game Boy Color game and 8th best-selling home and handheld console game in the United States.
