= Harry Potter: Quidditch Champions =

2024 video game

- Developer: Unbroken Studios
- Publisher: Warner Bros. Games (Note: Published under the Portkey Games label)
- Series: Wizarding World
- Platforms: PlayStation 4; PlayStation 5; Windows; Xbox One; Xbox Series X/S; Nintendo Switch
- Release: PS4, Windows, Xbox One, PS5, Xbox Series X/S: WW: September 3, 2024; Nintendo Switch: WW: November 8, 2024
- Genre: Sports
- Modes: Single-player, multiplayer

Harry Potter: Quidditch Champions is a sports video game developed by Unbroken Studios and published by Warner Bros. Games under its Portkey Games label. The game focuses on the Harry Potter-related sport Quidditch. The player controls a character that holds a specific position in Quidditch and engages in broomstick adventures and competitive multiplayer modes.

Development commenced several years prior to its announcement in April 2023, where Warner Bros. Games released a first look alongside a limited playtest. The game was released on September 3, 2024, for PlayStation 4, PlayStation 5, Windows, Xbox One, and Xbox Series X/S, with it being available from Day One on PlayStation Plus. The Nintendo Switch version was released on November 8, 2024. The game received mixed reviews.

== Gameplay ==
Harry Potter: Quidditch Champions is a fantasy sports game that focuses on competition. The game revolves around Quidditch, a popular sport in the fictional universe of Harry Potter. Players can customize their character and select from four different positions: Chaser, Seeker, Beater, and Keeper. The game offers an immersive Quidditch experience that includes a variety of broomstick adventures and competitive multiplayer modes which allow players to participate in the sport with their friends.

The game also has some departures from traditional Quidditch rules from the books and films, including the following:

- Teams have one Beater instead of two for a total of six players per team instead of seven.
- Catching the Golden Snitch is worth 30 points instead of 150 and does not automatically end the match.
- Instead of playing until the Snitch is caught, teams play until time expires or until one team scores 100 points.
  - If the scores are tied when time expires, a golden score overtime commences where the next goal (similar to a golden goal) or catching the Snitch wins.

Players can meet or play as numerous familiar characters from the series. The single-player career mode also allows players to not only play in Hogwarts' Inter-House Quidditch Cup but also a new Triwizard Schools Quidditch Cup in the style of the Triwizard Tournament from Goblet of Fire and finally the Quidditch World Cup representing one of 16 countries.

== Development ==
Harry Potter: Quidditch Champions is developed by Los Angeles-based Unbroken Studios and published by Warner Bros. Games under its Portkey Games label. Development of the game began several years prior to 2023. Its creation was announced 20 years after the previous Quidditch-themed game Harry Potter: Quidditch World Cup. The game's visual style is distinct from other Harry Potter games such as Hogwarts Legacy, as it endeavors to have a more stylized and cartoon-like appearance. Despite being set in the Wizarding World universe, the game is not a direct adaptation of the books or films. The Portkey game developers strive to maintain the authenticity of J. K. Rowling's original vision while also introducing elements that allow fans to explore the world of magic in new ways. Rowling has no direct involvement in the game's development.

In May 2023, gameplay footage surfaced on Reddit and similar websites. Warner Bros. swiftly took action and removed any leaked content of a recent playtest. In August 2023, additional footage leaked, in which players take on the roles of well-known characters such as Harry Potter and Ron Weasley. A gameplay trailer was released on July 29, 2024.

=== Release ===
In April 2023, Warner Bros. Games unveiled the first look of Quidditch Champions along with the announcement of a limited playtest for the game. GamesRadar+ noted that some fans expressed criticism towards the announcement, citing the absence of Quidditch in the recently launched Hogwarts Legacy. In June 2024, Unbroken announced that the game would release on Windows and home consoles in September. The game will have an expansion pack titled 'The Legacy Pack', which will include exclusive content from Hogwarts Legacy.

== Reception ==
Reception

Aggregate scores
Aggregator	Score
Metacritic	PS5: 66/100; XSX: 64/100; PC: 63/100
OpenCritic	25% recommend

Review scores
Publication	Score
GamesRadar+	4/5
IGN	6/10

Quidditch Champions received "mixed or average" reviews, according to review aggregator platform Metacritic. Fellow review aggregator OpenCritic assessed that the game received fair approval, being recommended by 25% of critics. While the lack of microtransactions was praised, the striking distinction from Hogwarts Legacy in visual fidelity was also noted.

IGN praised the gameplay mechanics but criticized the lack of story-driven modes. GameSpot highlighted the graphics and online mode but felt it did not innovate compared to previous QM titles.

=== Sales ===
Despite being one of the biggest PS Plus games of 2024 and boosting the PS Plus September 2024 player count, Quidditch Champions dropped in popularity by 48% on the PlayStation Network in its second week.
