= Harry Potter and the Philosopher's Stone (GBA video game) =

2001 video game

- Developer: Griptonite Games
- Publisher: Electronic Arts
- Director: Phil Trumbo
- Producer: J.C. Connors
- Designers: Stephen C. Nguyen; Jim Verhaeghe
- Artist: Randy Briley
- Writer: Michael Humes
- Composers: Mark Yeend; Drew Cady; Ian Rodia
- Series: Harry Potter
- Platform: Game Boy Advance
- Release: NA: 16 November 2001; EU: 23 November 2001
- Genres: Adventure, puzzle
- Mode: Single-player

Harry Potter and the Philosopher's Stone (released in the United States as Harry Potter and the Sorcerer's Stone) is a 2001 video game developed by Griptonite Games and published by Electronic Arts for the Game Boy Advance. Based on the 1997 novel of the same name, the player controls Harry Potter, who must navigate his first year in the Hogwarts School of Witchcraft and Wizardry and eventually confront the villainous Lord Voldemort.

The Game Boy Advance version was released simultaneously with the PlayStation and Game Boy Color versions and received mixed reviews from critics. While the visuals and faithfulness to the novel were praised, the gameplay was criticized as shallow and repetitive. In the United States, the game was among the highest-selling titles released for handheld consoles between 2000 and 2006.

== Gameplay ==
An example of a puzzle segment in Harry Potter and the Philosopher's Stone

Harry Potter and the Philosopher's Stone is an adventure game with puzzle elements in which the player controls Harry Potter, guiding him through a narrative reflecting that of the novel. The game is viewed from a top-down perspective, and Harry can explore his environment and communicate with other characters.

Throughout the game, Harry learns spells by engaging in a Simon Says-like exercise in which the player must match the movements of Harry's professor with the D-pad. This is followed by a segment in which Harry must use the newly learned spell to collect a number of certain items while fending off creatures and solving puzzles. Harry's health is represented by a series of lightning bolts. It can be restored by collecting Bertie Bott's Every Flavour Beans, and Harry's maximum health can be increased by collecting three "Pumpkin Pasties". Points where the player can save their progress are represented by floating books.

In some segments, Harry partakes in the game of Quidditch, in which he flies on a broomstick and must locate and catch a Golden Snitch fluttering about the arena. Upon approaching the Snitch's vicinity, the player must maneuvre Harry through a series of rings in order to catch it.

== Plot ==
The novel's first 100 pages — covering the giant Rubeus Hagrid leaving the orphaned infant Harry Potter with his maternal aunt's family, Harry's invitation to attend the Hogwarts School of Witchcraft and Wizardry, and his sorting into the Gryffindor house — are summarized in a storybook-like introduction. Harry befriends Ron Weasley and Hermione Granger and they partake in a competition between the houses of Hogwarts to win the House Cup upon the year's end, in which points are granted for satisfactory performance and detracted for infractions.

Harry is tricked by the arrogant Draco Malfoy into wandering the halls of Hogwarts post-curfew. During this time, he discovers a great three-headed dog, Fluffy, guarding a trapdoor. When a mountain troll infiltrates Hogwarts, Harry and Ron notice Professor Severus Snape behaving suspiciously before they go to rescue Hermione from the troll. Harry and Hermione learn from Hagrid that Fluffy can be soothed with music and that Nicolas Flamel is involved in what is being guarded. One night, while secretly obtaining ingredients for Snape's class, Harry happens upon the Mirror of Erised, in which he sees his parents. The headmaster Albus Dumbledore appears and explains that the mirror reflects a person's deepest desire. He says that the mirror will be moved to a new home the next day, but warns that Harry may soon see it again.

Hermione, after an arduous research period, learns that Nicolas Flamel's creation, the Philosopher's Stone, can produce an elixir that grants immortality. Harry determines that Fluffy is guarding the Philosopher's Stone and concludes that Snape must be after it. Harry joins Hagrid in an investigation of an attack on a unicorn in the adjacent forest and encounters a figure drinking a dead unicorn's blood. He is rescued by a centaur, who explains that unicorn's blood can maintain the life of someone close to death, and Harry realizes that the figure is his parents' killer, Lord Voldemort. Assuming that Snape is trying to obtain the Philosopher's Stone for Voldemort, Harry, Ron, and Hermione pass through the trapdoor and traverse obstacles put in place by the school's professors, but ultimately only Harry can proceed. To Harry's surprise, Professor Quirinus Quirrell stands in the final room trying to extract the Philosopher's Stone from the Mirror of Erised. Before engaging in a battle with Harry, Quirrell reveals Voldemort's face manifested upon the back of his skull.

Following Voldemort's defeat, Harry awakes in the school's infirmary, where Dumbledore discloses that the Philosopher's Stone has been destroyed, but shares Harry's concern that its loss will not prevent Voldemort's return. At the school's end-of-year banquet, Dumbledore announces that Harry's acts of nerve and courage have won Gryffindor enough points to win them the House Cup.

== Development and release ==
On 10 August 2000, Electronic Arts announced that it had acquired the video game rights to the Harry Potter franchise. The license was showcased at E3 2001, with titles for the Game Boy Color, Game Boy Advance, PlayStation, and the PC scheduled for November 2001. The Game Boy Advance version of Harry Potter and the Philosopher's Stone was developed by Griptonite Games, under the creative direction of Phil Trumbo and with J.C. Connors acting as producer. Stephen C. Nguyen and Jim Verhaeghe designed the game with Randy Briley as lead artist. Michael Humes adapted the novel's story for the game. Mark Yeend, Drew Cady, and Ian Rodia produced the audio using tools licensed from Factor 5.

The Game Boy Advance version, along with the Game Boy Color and PlayStation versions, was designed with input from Harry Potter author J.K. Rowling and the producers of the film adaptation to ensure that all three versions shared a consistent presentation. The Game Boy Advance version was released with the other two versions in North America on 16 November 2001, and in Europe on 23 November.

== Reception ==
Reception

Aggregate score
Aggregator	Score
Metacritic	64/100

Review scores
Publication	Score
AllGame	3/5
Electronic Gaming Monthly	15.5/30
GamePro	3.5/5
GameSpot	5.4/10
GameZone	8.9/10
IGN	6/10
Nintendo Power	4/5

Harry Potter and the Philosopher's Stone received "mixed or average" reviews according to review aggregator Metacritic. Michael Lafferty of GameZone said that the game lived up to his expectations as a fan of the book series and figured that it would be appealing to casual gamers as well, but warned that the initial puzzles would be too simple for veterans and that the enemies' artificial intelligence (AI) was predictable. Nintendo Power was pleased by the variety of quests, and approved of the difficulty and level of detail. Dan Amrich of GamePro and Gerald Villoria of GameSpot regarded the game as a run-of-the-mill adventure title, but considered it to be more challenging than expected, which Villoria attributed to the delay in Harry's Flipendo spell and the erratic enemy AI. Both were frustrated by the necessity of starting an entire segment over upon falling down a bottomless pit.

Chris Baker of Electronic Gaming Monthly cited the delay in Harry's spells as a mark of unresponsive controls, and Skyler Miller of AllGame felt that it rendered combat "more of an annoyance than a sincere challenge". Miller and IGN's Craig Harris commended the game's faithfulness to the source material, though Harris and Electronic Gaming Monthly's Baker and Jeanne Kim were annoyed by the repetitive and abundant nature of the puzzle segments, which Harris compared to Golden Sun and The Legend of Zelda. Harris described the nighttime sequences as clever but faulted the characters' inconsistent line of sight, and noted a similarly faulty collision detection throughout the game.

Miller respected the direction of creating an adventure game as opposed to a platformer as was common practice with handheld film tie-ins. However, he opined that the game's adherence to the source material's narrative deprived it of energy and a sense of adventure, explaining that the personal nature of the story's conflicts made for little action that could be easily translated into a video game. Amrich and Harris lamented the scarce save points, with the former claiming that "you should expect to play for an hour or two each time you pick it up if you want to make real progress". On the Quidditch sequences, Harris and Villoria concluded that they lacked ambition and were not as exciting as they could have been. Baker criticized the broomstick's excessive speed, which made turning difficult, and Kim said that the Quidditch sequences were too infrequent to affect the game's feeling of repetitiveness.

The visual presentation was cited as a strength, with reviewers praising the smooth animation, lush and colourful backgrounds, cutscene illustrations, and stylised likenesses of the characters to their film counterparts. Harris remarked that "it's almost as if the artists actually digitized [Harry Potter actor] Alan Rickman in his deadpan stroll for his game representation". However, he faulted the overhead camera perspective in relation to the objects and sprites, which he said were drawn for a side-scrolling environment and made judging the position of some objects difficult. Baker and Amrich complained that the nighttime sequences were rendered too dark by the Game Boy Advance's lack of a backlight.

Lafferty regarded the audio as solid but standard for the console. Amrich opined that the "happy storybook music [...] is sometimes just plain incongruous with the onscreen action". Villoria perceived a strong quality in the musical themes and sound effects, which he attributed to the licensed audio tools used by the development team. Both Amrich and Harris remarked that the console's sound quality caused Harry's cry of "Flipendo" to resemble the word "Nintendo".

=== Sales ===
In its debut month, Harry Potter and the Philosopher's Stone was the highest-selling Game Boy Advance game and 8th best-selling home and handheld console game in the United States. By August 2006, Harry Potter and the Philosopher's Stone sold 690,000 copies and earned $26 million in the United States, making it the 36th-highest-selling game for the Game Boy Advance, Nintendo DS or PlayStation Portable in that country.
