= Harry Potter: Quidditch World Cup =

2003 video game

- North American PlayStation 2 cover art
- Developers: EA UK; Magic Pockets (Game Boy Advance)
- Publisher: Electronic Arts
- Composers: Jeremy Soule; Giuseppe Verdi
- Series: Wizarding World
- Platforms: Microsoft Windows; PlayStation 2; Xbox; GameCube; Game Boy Advance
- Release: Microsoft Windows, GameCube, PlayStation 2, Xbox: NA: 28 October 2003; EU: 7 November 2003; Game Boy Advance: NA: 28 October 2003; EU: 21 November 2003
- Genres: Sports, action
- Modes: Single-player, multiplayer

Harry Potter: Quidditch World Cup is a 2003 sports game that features the fictional sport of Quidditch from the Harry Potter franchise. The game was developed by two teams, EA UK and Magic Pockets, and was published by Electronic Arts. It was released for Game Boy Advance, Microsoft Windows, PlayStation 2, Xbox, and GameCube. The game bears no relation to the abandoned Nintendo 64 project.

This game serves as the first entry of Harry Potter: Quidditch spin-off series. A second installment, Harry Potter: Quidditch Champions, was released on September 3, 2024.

== Characters/Teams ==
Hogwarts House team rosters are based on Harry's third year (Prisoner of Azkaban). Other House and national team members not named in the books are named in this game, and their names are also listed on Chocolate Frog cards in the Half-Blood Prince video game.

As in the first three books, Lee Jordan returns as play-by-play commentator for the House Quidditch Cup matches, but unique to this game, Harry and Ron's dorm-mate Seamus Finnegan joins as color commentator. Meanwhile, Ludo Bagman returns as play-by-play commentator for international matches, with a set of color commentators. Other characters make appearances in the stands and elsewhere, such as Hermione Granger, Ron Weasley, Rolanda Hooch and Albus Dumbledore.

== Gameplay ==
=== General ===
At the start of a Quidditch match, the player controls the Chasers, who try to score goals with the Quaffle to earn points, with each goal worth 10 points. Along the top of the screen, each team's score display also features a thin bar with one-half of the Golden Snitch on the end. Actions performed in the game by the Chasers, such as completing a pass and scoring a goal, increase the bar slightly. The player can perform a string of combo passes and shots, which can increase the bar by an amount proportional to the length of the combo string, up to eight consecutive actions. The player can continue to chain actions to the combo as long as the player team is in possession of the Quaffle, but the counter will not go past 8. The bar will continue to increase in length until both halves of the Snitch join, which marks the end of the Chaser phase.

The Chasers can also perform moves to drain the opposing team's bar, such as successfully hitting an opposing Chaser with the Bludger, successfully landing a Special Move tackle, or performing a Team Special Move. Each team in the game has a unique Team Special Move that, when activated, plays a short cinematic of spectacular teamwork between the team Chasers (and sometimes Beaters) and has a possibility of scoring multiple goals. For example, the Ravenclaw Team Special Move, the Burdish of Raven, scores three times for 30 points total – something no other Team Special Move, even those of the national teams, does. Although the original Quidditch rule forbids more than two Chasers to be within the scoring area at the same time (known as Stooging, as stated in Quidditch Through the Ages), doing such behaviour in this game will not result in a penalty of any kind.

Once both halves of the Snitch join, the game moves into the Snitch Chase phase, regardless of score – it is possible, though unlikely, to start the Snitch Chase with the score still at 0-0. During the Snitch Chase, the player controls the Seeker and follows the Golden Snitch in a race against the opposing Seeker to catch it. The player can use a speed boost, which drains a boost bar directly proportional to the size of the Snitch bar accumulated during the Chaser phase of the game. Staying in the Snitch's slipstream helps refill the player's boost bar and will cause the bar to extend its size if the bar is full. Using the boost, the player will be able to grab the Snitch once it is close enough. As soon as the Seeker from either team manages to catch the Snitch, the match ends. Successfully catching the Snitch grants the player team 150 points and typically wins the match, but in case the opposing team is far ahead in points, catching the Snitch can be useful for catching up, even if the player team would lose the match anyway.

=== Hogwarts ===
In this stage, the player competes for the Hogwarts Inter-House Quidditch Cup. Upon selecting Hogwarts for the first time, a presentation cutscene by the Gryffindor Quidditch Team's Keeper and captain Oliver Wood will play. Afterwards, the player gets to choose between the four Hogwarts House teams – Gryffindor, Slytherin, Hufflepuff, or Ravenclaw. Each of these teams is represented by its Seeker at the team selection screen – Harry Potter for Gryffindor, Draco Malfoy for Slytherin, Cedric Diggory for Hufflepuff, and Cho Chang for Ravenclaw. Unless the first Quidditch Cup game has been unlocked, upon selecting a House team, the Seeker of the team will give a short compliment on the player's selection before proceeding to the House challenges screen.

The House challenges focus on specific aspects of a full Quidditch match and are used to learn the game for new players or polish skills for returning players. There are a total of six challenges: Passing, Tackle and Shoot, Seeker, Beaters and Bludgers, Special Moves, and Combos. Each of these challenges is the same for every House team and is led by a relevant player within the selected House team, e.g. Harry Potter leads the Gryffindor Seeker challenge, while Angelina Johnson leads the Gryffindor Passing challenge, and Oliver Wood leads the Gryffindor Combo challenge. Only the first three challenges are available initially, and completing all of them allows the player to play a full Quidditch match – the first Hogwarts Quidditch Cup game. Completing the first game unlocks two more House challenges, which must be completed to proceed to the next game. Once the second game is completed, the final challenge becomes available, which unlocks the final game for the Cup upon completion.

While playing the House challenges, the player can earn Quidditch cards by beating record times. Collecting these cards can help unlock special moves that can be performed during gameplay and other kinds of in-game content. Some of these cards also unlock the Team Special Move for a particular team. Such cards contain three different tasks that can only be performed while playing with that team in an actual Quidditch match, with the tasks varying for every playable team, such as getting to the Quaffle first, scoring a certain number of goals in a single match, or winning a match without conceding a goal.

Each game in the Hogwarts Quidditch Cup depends on which challenges have been completed, e.g. special moves and combo moves are unavailable in the first game. The Cup is based on points accumulation, not wins, so high-scoring teams have a better chance at winning it. The team with the most points total after all three games have been played wins the Cup. Winning the Hogwarts Quidditch Cup with any team unlocks the Quidditch World Cup.

=== World Cup ===
The World Cup stage is similar to the Hogwarts stage in terms of gameplay, but there are no challenges that have to be played before a match. In addition, the teams in the World Cup are national teams representing their respective countries instead of Hogwarts Houses. A total of nine teams are available to the player to choose from, namely England, the USA, Japan, Germany, France, Australia, the Nordic Team, Spain, and Bulgaria, with the latter featuring the "Star Seeker" from the book series, Viktor Krum. Bulgaria is also notable for being the only unlockable team in the game, available after collecting a certain number of Quidditch cards.

Another key difference compared to the Hogwarts stage is that the player also gets to choose which model of broom to use, which essentially determines the difficulty of the World Cup. The four models available are Comet 260 (Easy), Nimbus 2000 (Medium), Nimbus 2001 (Hard), and Firebolt (Very Hard). Only Comet 260 is available initially – all others have to be unlocked by collecting Quidditch cards. Each broom offers subtle differences in handling in-game and, to a much greater extent, affects the AI opponents' behavior. All of that aside, the player can still earn more Quidditch cards by playing World Cup matches, including the ones that unlock Team Special Moves.

The player will play against every team in the World Cup twice, once at the player team's home ground and once at the opposing team's, for a total of sixteen games. The Cup is awarded the same way as the Hogwarts Cup, i.e. the team with the most points total after sixteen game wins the World Cup. The player can play multiple separate World Cups with different teams simultaneously, but can only run one World Cup with any given team. For example, the player can have a running World Cup with England and another with France at the same time, but not two separate World Cups with France at the same time.

=== Exhibition ===
Exhibition allows the player to play a one-off match between Hogwarts House teams on the school's Quidditch pitch during summer or winter. The player can also choose to play an international match between national teams, with the selection of nine venues. Only the venues of the England and US teams are available initially, but as the player wins against other national teams in an "away" game in the World Cup, more venues become available. This mode also offers local multiplayer option. The team available for the away side depends on the team pool of the chosen team for the home side, so that Hogwarts teams cannot play against World Cup teams or on any international venue, nor can World Cup teams play on the Hogwarts Quidditch pitch.

== Reception ==
Reception

Aggregate scores
Aggregator	Score
GameRankings	(PC) 71% (PS2 & GC) 70% (Xbox) 69% (GBA) 53%
Metacritic	(PC & Xbox) 69/100 (GC & PS2) 68/100 (GBA) 53/100

Review scores
Publication	Score
Electronic Gaming Monthly	7.17/10
Eurogamer	7/10
Famitsu	25/40
Game Informer	7.75/10
GamePro	(GC) 4/5 (GBA) 2.5/5
GameRevolution	C
GameSpot	6.5/10 (GBA) 4.6/10
GameSpy	(PC) 3/5 (GBA) 2/5
GameZone	(PS2) 8.2/10 (PC) 8.1/10
IGN	7.2/10 (GBA) 6/10
Nintendo Power	(GC) 3.8/5 (GBA) 3.4/5
Official U.S. PlayStation Magazine	3/5
Official Xbox Magazine (US)	7.9/10
PC Gamer (US)	80%

The game received mixed to positive reviews. GameRankings gave the game a score of 70% for the GameCube version, 71% for the PC version, 70% for the PlayStation 2 version, 69% for the Xbox version, and 53% for the Game Boy Advance version. Likewise, Metacritic gave it a score of 68 out of 100 each for the GameCube and PS2 versions, 69 out of 100 each for the PC and Xbox versions, and 53 out of 100 for the GBA version.

GameSpot gave all versions of the game except the Game Boy Advance version a rating of 6.5/10, citing sluggish controls and shallow gameplay, but praising the inclusion of easily recognizable characters from the books and films, and good graphics. IGN gave all console versions of the game except the Game Boy Advance version a 7.2/10 and GameSpy gave the PC version a score of three stars out of five. In Japan, Famitsu gave the GBA version a score of two sixes, one five, and one eight, for a total of 25 out of 40.

The game's critics generally criticized the game's feel, as the controls were felt to be sluggish. IGN cited the game as being "fun, but not compelling." Eurogamer cited the game commentary track as being "painful at times", but also described "Quidditch World Cup above [as] being an average, if well-implemented, fantasy sports game."

== Sequel ==
In April 2023, a spiritual successor, Harry Potter: Quidditch Champions was announced. The game was released on PlayStation 4, PlayStation 5, Xbox One, and Xbox Series X and Series S, and Microsoft Windows on September 3rd, 2024. The game was later released on Nintendo Switch on November 8th 2024.
