= Harry Potter and the Philosopher's Stone (PC video game) =

2001 video game

- Developer: KnowWonder (Note: Mac OS version developed by Westlake Interactive)
- Publisher: Electronic Arts (Note: Mac OS version published by Aspyr Media)
- Director: Phil Trumbo
- Producer: Elizabeth Smith
- Designer: Kris Summers
- Programmer: Glen Kirk
- Artist: Christopher Vuchetich
- Writers: Guy Miller; Simon Phipps
- Composer: Jeremy Soule
- Series: Harry Potter
- Engine: Unreal Engine 1
- Platforms: Windows, Mac OS
- Release: Windows; 16 November 2001; Mac OS; 20 February 2002
- Genre: Action-adventure
- Mode: Single-player

Harry Potter and the Philosopher's Stone, released in the United States as Harry Potter and the Sorcerer's Stone, is a 2001 video game developed by KnowWonder and published by Electronic Arts for Windows. A version for Mac OS was developed by Westlake Interactive and published by Aspyr the following year. Based on the 1997 novel of the same name, the player controls Harry Potter, who must navigate his first year in the Hogwarts School of Witchcraft and Wizardry and eventually confront the villainous Lord Voldemort.

The Windows version was one of several video game adaptations of the novel published by Electronic Arts alongside versions for the Game Boy Color, Game Boy Advance and PlayStation. Upon release, the game received mixed reviews; while critics dismissed the gameplay as simplistic, they commended the visuals, audio and faithfulness to the license. The game was among the highest-selling computer titles released between 2000 and 2006 in the United States.

== Gameplay ==
Harry Potter preparing a spell in an example of gameplay in Harry Potter and the Philosopher's Stone

Harry Potter and the Philosopher's Stone is a third-person action-adventure game in which the player controls Harry Potter, guiding him through a narrative reflecting that of the novel. Harry can walk, jump, use his wand, and interact with objects and characters. The act of jumping can either be performed manually or automatically depending on the settings in the options menu. Harry's stamina is represented by a lightning bolt on the upper-left corner of the screen. Harry will faint if his stamina completely depletes (such as from falling from a great height), forcing the player to restart at the most recent checkpoint. Stamina can be restored by collecting chocolate frogs.

Harry learns spells from his teachers, who instruct the player to trace a given shape within a time limit. To successfully learn a spell, the player must achieve a minimum level of accuracy in tracing the shape, which is displayed on the lower-left corner of the screen. After learning a spell, the player can hold down the left mouse button to prime Harry's wand and aim using a sparkling cursor. When the cursor is moved over a viable target, the cursor changes into a spell's trace shape, and the player can cast the corresponding spell upon releasing the mouse button. Harry's new spells are tested in challenge areas involving platforming and puzzles. Throughout the game, Harry may collect Bertie Bott's Every Flavour Beans, which can be exchanged with other students for Famous Witches and Wizards cards.

In some segments, Harry partakes in the game of Quidditch, in which he flies on a broomstick and must locate and catch a Golden Snitch fluttering about the arena. The Snitch leaves behind a trail of hoops, which Harry must maneuvre through in order to fill a bar at the bottom of the screen; filling this bar completely grants Harry a chance to grab the Snitch. In this event, the bar turns into a graphic of the Snitch shifting back and forth, with a graphic of Harry's hand occupying one end of the bar. Successfully grabbing the Snitch wins the game, but if too much time passes, the Snitch will escape, forcing the chase to resume. Completing the first Quidditch match in the game allows the player to access the "Quidditch League" from the main menu, in which Harry progresses through a competition and faces increasingly skilled teams. Collisions with Bludgers and other players reduce Harry's stamina; complete depletion of stamina during the Quidditch League will cause Harry's team to forfeit the match and concede victory to the opposing team.

== Plot ==
A giant, Rubeus Hagrid, leaves the orphaned infant Harry Potter with his maternal aunt's family. Eleven years later, Harry is invited to attend the Hogwarts School of Witchcraft and Wizardry. While Harry collects school supplies at Diagon Alley, Hagrid retrieves a package from Gringotts Wizarding Bank, telling Harry that he believes it would be safer at Hogwarts. Upon his arrival, Harry is sorted into the Gryffindor house, where he resides and studies through the year. Harry befriends Ron Weasley and Hermione Granger and they partake in a competition between the houses of Hogwarts to win the House Cup upon the year's end, in which points are granted for satisfactory performance and detracted for infractions.

Harry, Hermione and Ron secretly investigate strange noises emanating from a forbidden corridor and witness Professor Severus Snape limping out of it. After Harry and Ron rescue Hermione from a mountain troll that had infiltrated the dormitory, Harry expresses his suspicion that someone attempting to enter the corridor had engineered the attack as a diversion. While helping Hagrid smuggle a baby dragon out of Hogwarts, Harry discovers the Mirror of Erised, in which he sees his parents. The headmaster Albus Dumbledore appears and explains that the mirror reflects a person's deepest desire. He says that the mirror will be moved to a new home shortly, but adds ominously that Harry will be prepared if he sees it again.

Hermione, Ron and Harry research the Philosopher's Stone, which produces an elixir that grants immortality. Hermione surmises that the package Hagrid procured from Gringotts contained the Philosopher's Stone, and that it is being guarded within the forbidden corridor. Snape's recent suspicious behavior leads the friends to assume that he is after the Philosopher's Stone, and move to prevent the theft when Dumbledore is called away from Hogwarts. In the forbidden corridor, they encounter a giant three-headed dog guarding a trapdoor, which Harry lulls to sleep with a flute given to him by Hagrid. Harry, Ron, and Hermione pass through the trapdoor and traverse obstacles put in place by the school's professors, but ultimately only Harry can proceed. He encounters Professor Quirinus Quirrell guarding the Mirror of Erised. The Mirror holds the Philosopher's Stone, which materializes within Harry's pocket. Lord Voldemort, the killer of Harry's parents, reveals himself to have manifested as a face on the back of Quirrell's head, and attempts to kill Harry for the Stone. Quirrell's body is destroyed in the ensuing battle, and Harry collapses just before Dumbledore arrives.

Harry awakes in the school's infirmary, where Dumbledore discloses that the Philosopher's Stone has been destroyed, but shares Harry's concern that its loss will not prevent Voldemort's return. At the school's end-of-year banquet, Dumbledore announces that Harry's acts of nerve and courage have won Gryffindor enough points to win them the House Cup. If the player had given Fred and George Weasley an allotted amount of Bertie Bott's Every Flavour Beans in all of their appearances, the twins play a prank on Snape which floods his room with the confection.

== Development and release ==
On 10 August 2000, Electronic Arts announced that it had acquired the video game rights to the Harry Potter franchise. The license was showcased at E3 2001, with titles for the Game Boy Color, Game Boy Advance, PlayStation, and the PC scheduled for November 2001. The PC version of Harry Potter and the Philosopher's Stone was developed by KnowWonder, under the creative direction of Phil Trumbo and with Elizabeth Smith acting as producer. The game was designed by Kris Summers and programmed by Glen Kirk. Christopher Vuchetich served as the lead artist. The script and dialogue were written and edited by Guy Miller and Simon Phipps. The music was composed by Jeremy Soule, and the sound was created by Mark Yeend.

The Windows version of the game was released in North America on 16 November 2001. Three days later, Westlake Interactive announced that they were developing a Mac OS version of the game. The project's code-name, "New World", was based on the similarity of the names of explorer and navigator Christopher Columbus and Harry Potter film director Chris Columbus. In December 2001, Aspyr Media announced their role as the game's publisher. The Mac OS version went gold on the week of 13 February 2002, and was released on 20 February.

== Reception ==
Reception

Aggregate score
Aggregator	Score
Metacritic	65/100

Review scores
Publication	Score
AllGame	3.5/5
EP Daily	7/10
GameSpot	5.5/10
GameSpy	68%
GameZone	8/10
IGN	6.4/10
PC Gamer (US)	59%
X-Play	3/5

Harry Potter and the Philosopher's Stone was met with "mixed or average" reviews upon release according to review aggregator platform Metacritic. Critics generally concluded that the simplistic gameplay would not satisfy experienced players, but recommended it as a solid experience for younger players and fans of the books or film. Steve Butts of IGN speculated that much of the game's budget was devoted to the license, and was disappointed as a Harry Potter fan that the gameplay lacked the sophistication of EA's previous title American McGee's Alice.

Andrew Bub of Extended Play, Gerald Villoria of GameSpot and Enid Burns of GameSpy were charmed by the wide scenario variety, with Villoria adding that the more exciting sequences made the lack of an obvious method of storing multiple saved games regrettable. Kevin Giacobbi of GameZone enjoyed the game's accessibility and gradually increasing difficulty, but mentioned that the lack of multiplayer and replayability may alienate hardcore gamers. Hilary Williams of AllGame deemed the customizable control scheme to be the game's best feature, but cautioned that the automatic jumping setting has the capability to backfire. Contrariwise, Burns determined the controls to be overly basic and unintuitive, and Villoria said that the ability to enable automatic jumping removed any semblance of challenge. Li C. Kuo of PC Gamer derided the inability to strafe, which frustrated efforts to dodge enemy projectiles.

Sean Miller of The Electric Playground faulted the lack of exciting rewards for uncovering secret areas, which attributed a feeling of tedium. He and Butts found the process of learning spells and the feature of casting spells with a single mouse click overly simplistic. Villoria considered the puzzles and platforming similarly simple and repetitive. Miller commended the recreation of the film's Quidditch field and the feel of the matches, but could not determine the mechanic for completing a match, and said that the matches become as repetitive and dull as the rest of the game after a couple of matches. Villoria determined the difficulty of the Quidditch matches to be negligible, explaining that the other players have no effect on the game's outcome. He also criticized the keyboard control scheme necessitated for the matches, which he described as awkward.

Reviewers praised the effective use of Unreal Engine 1; they admired the faithful recreation of the film's visual style and were pleased by the atmospheric details and special effects, with Villoria adding that the use of lighting and shadows enhanced the game's "spookier" moments. However, Villoria pointed out the limited range of textures, which he said resulted in the visuals becoming somewhat monotonous. Williams described the game as graphically excellent, but observed some shortcomings such as occasionally awkward camera angles and non-moving lips on the characters. Burns was troubled by the difficulty of running the game smoothly on faster systems.

The audio was positively received, particularly Jeremy Soule's score. Bub described his compositions as subtler than John Williams' score and more fitting of the game's action, particularly in the endgame and Quidditch segments. Villoria enjoyed the emotional resonance of Soule's score, but said that the lack of variety in the selections made them slightly repetitive. Reviewers were impressed by the game's voice-acting, with Bub being especially surprised by the accuracy of the sound-alike actors. Villoria admired the voice-acting quality and speech variety as well as the "bedtime-story-style" narration, but was annoyed by the repetitiveness of the spell incantations. Williams warned that the characters' strong English accents may be difficult for some players to understand.

While Miller commended the narrative's faithfulness to the novel, he pointed out that its loyalty would lead to predictability for players familiar with the story, and that the underdeveloped gameplay did not make the plot developments worthwhile. Although Butts admired the faithfulness of the setting's spirit, he found his immersion endangered by the characters' frequent references to video game control inputs and mechanics. Villoria dismissed the narrative cutscenes, depicted as still illustrations, as a rushed and uncompelling means of conveying the story and "obligatory filler" between gameplay sequences.

== Sales and awards ==
In the United States, Harry Potter and the Philosopher's Stone was listed among the top three highest-selling PC video games from November 2001 to February 2002, and was the top selling PC title in December 2001. In February 2002, the NPD Group listed it as the third top-selling PC game of 2001 after being available for only two months in North America. North American sales of its computer version reached 867,481 units by the end of 2001, which drew revenues of $24.6 million.

In the United States alone, the game sold 1.3 million copies and earned $33.9 million by August 2006, after its release in November 2001. It was the country's fourth best-selling computer game between January 2000 and August 2006. In the United Kingdom, the Entertainment and Leisure Software Publishers Association gave the game a "Gold" certification, for sales of at least 200,000 copies in the region.

The PC version of Harry Potter and the Philosopher's Stone received two nominations from the Academy of Interactive Arts & Sciences for "PC Family Game of the Year" and "Outstanding Achievement in Original Musical Composition" at the 5th Annual Interactive Achievement Awards.
