= Harry Potter and the Deathly Hallows – Part 2 (video game) =

2011 video game

- PC cover art
- Developers: EA Bright Light; Full Fat (Nintendo DS); Gameloft Chengdu (mobile)
- Publishers: Electronic Arts; Gameloft (mobile)
- Composers: James Hannigan; Allister Brimble (Nintendo DS)
- Series: Wizarding World
- Platforms: Mobile devices; Nintendo DS; Microsoft Windows; PlayStation 3; Wii; Xbox 360
- Release: Mobile devices: NA: 11 July 2011; Microsoft Windows, PlayStation 3, Xbox 360, Wii, Nintendo DS: NA: 12 July 2011; EU: 15 July 2011
- Genre: Action-adventure
- Mode: Single-player

Harry Potter and the Deathly Hallows – Part 2 is a 2011 action-adventure game. It is based on the 2011 film of the same name. It was released on 11 July 2011 for mobiles devices, and on 12 July in North America and 15 July in Europe for Microsoft Windows, Nintendo DS, PlayStation 3, Wii, and Xbox 360.

The game continues to follow Harry Potter, Ron Weasley, and Hermione Granger on their quest to defeat Lord Voldemort by destroying his remaining Horcruxes, items which contain part of his soul. While critics considered the game an improvement over its predecessor, it received mixed-to-negative reviews for the same reasons, namely for its gameplay, poor enemy AI and overly repetitive combat.

== Gameplay ==
The gameplay of Deathly Hallows – Part 2 differs from Part 1, in order to address complaints made with the previous game. The game progresses linearly, through cutscenes, but does not include side missions like the previous game. Combat in Deathly Hallows – Part 2 involves button presses which initiates spell-casting as an attack. Three face buttons, usually with a symbol or a letter, on the controller have two spells each, and by pressing a button twice the player can access the button's second spell. For the Windows version, the player presses one of the six buttons to select a spell. A new feature is the ability to "Apparate", which allows the player to teleport in and out of battles, as a form of defence. Only Harry has this ability though. The player is able to control several characters from a third person over-the-shoulder camera including Harry Potter, Ron Weasley, Hermione Granger, Neville Longbottom, Minerva McGonagall, Seamus Finnigan, Ginny Weasley, and Molly Weasley. In the final battle, the player uses the directional buttons to move the beam and focus it on Voldemort.

== Development ==
Part 2 of the video game was released to coincide with the release of the second part of Harry Potter and the Deathly Hallows. EA released a teaser in their Facebook page on April 21 and released the Part 2 video game site on the same day.

== Release ==
On 8 May 2011, EA revealed the game covers for all the major platforms. The cover depicts the trio, surrounded by fellow Hogwarts students, and Death Eaters, and a destroyed Hogwarts in flames in the background.

Part 2 is the first Harry Potter video game to feature PlayStation Move functionality. On 26 May 2011, six new images from the game surfaced online along with a new interview with IGN. The images included, duels between the core characters, and the Hogwarts castle itself, under severe stress. On 21 April 2011, Emma Watson released the first trailer. On 1 June 2011, Rupert Grint released a new trailer, showing all the playable characters. Later, a second new trailer was presented showing the tagline "War is Coming" and "The Battle for Hogwarts". On July, before the film release, the launch trailer was released.

== Reception ==
Harry Potter and the Deathly Hallows – Part 2

Aggregate score
Aggregator	Score
Metacritic	(DS) 55/100 (Wii) 47/100 (X360) 44/100 (PS3) 43/100 (PC) 43/100

Review scores
Publication	Score
Eurogamer	4/10
Game Informer	6.5/10
GamePro	2/5
GameSpot	4/10
GamesRadar+	0.5/5
GameTrailers	5.4/10
IGN	5.5/10
Official Xbox Magazine (US)	6/10
Digital Spy	2/5
The Escapist	2.5/5

Harry Potter and the Deathly Hallows – Part 2 received mixed to negative reviews from critics, though some critics found Part 2 an improvement of Part 1. Lowest ratings on Metacritic came from GamesRadar, stating, "This is the absolute nadir of the series. Harry Potter has finally devolved into a total cash-in and we can't score it low enough." GamingXP gave the Xbox 360 and PC versions positive reviews, saying "Where graphical aesthetics, thrilling atmosphere and a cinematic soundtrack celebrate their marriage, the gamer always wins."

The Escapist gave it two-and-a-half stars out of five and said of the game, "The shooting mechanics and levels are getting better but the encounters themselves are too repetitive. I hope someone takes the basic idea and does something more with it. The absence of basic storytelling and scene transitions make it hard to enjoy on its own." Digital Spy gave it two stars out of five and said, "The gameplay remains a weak imitation of a third-person shooter and the enemy A.I. is extremely poor. The lack of variety in the set pieces and the sheer number of dopey Death Eaters makes Harry Potter and the Deathly Hallows: Part 2 a tedious experience, riddled with repetition." The Daily Telegraph also gave it a score of four out of ten and called it "a bland, unimaginative shooting gallery that lacks the thing that matters most: magic."
