= Harry Potter for Kinect =

2012 video game

- Developer: Eurocom
- Publisher: Warner Bros. Interactive Entertainment
- Series: Wizarding World
- Platform: Xbox 360
- Release: NA: October 9, 2012; WW: October 12, 2012
- Genre: Action
- Modes: Single-player, multiplayer

Harry Potter for Kinect is a 2012 action game developed by Eurocom and published by Warner Bros. Interactive Entertainment for the Xbox 360. It requires the Kinect accessory.

== Gameplay ==
Each school year in Hogwarts is a series of minigames. There are 31 minigames from key events in the series, including things like potion mixing, broom flying, and casting magic. The player is graded on a five star scale after every minigame. The game allows the player to create their own avatar with the Kinect camera. A split-screen multiplayer is available.

== Reception ==
Reception

Aggregate score
Aggregator	Score
Metacritic	54/100

Review scores
Publication	Score
4Players	4.0/10
Eurogamer	4/10
GameTrailers	4.8/10
GamingBolt	3/10

Harry Potter for Kinect received an aggregated score of 54 out of 100 on Metacritic based on 15 reviews, indicating "mixed or average" reviews. GameTrailers said the minigames are boring and too rigidly designed. 4Players called the game "very brief and unspectacular", they didn't like how the magic gesture system worked. Eurogamer compared the game unfavorably to Rush: A Disney–Pixar Adventure. GamingBolt called the gameplay boring and said to avoid the game at all costs.
