= EA Mobile =

American video game developer

EA Mobile Inc.
- Type: Subsidiary
- Industry: Video games
- Founded: 2004; 22 years ago
- Founder: John Batter
- Headquarters: Los Angeles, California, United States
- Key people: Jeff Karp (SVP, EA Mobile)
- Revenue: ▲$637 million (2017)
- Number of employees: ▲800+ (2017)
- Parent: Electronic Arts
- Subsidiaries: Slingshot Games; Track Twenty; EA Redwood Studios; Playdemic; Firemonkeys Studios; Glu Mobile

EA Mobile Inc. is an American video game development studio of the publisher Electronic Arts (EA) for mobile platforms.

The studio's primary business is producing games for mobile phones. It has also produced other entertainment-related software such as ringtone applications, as well as games for other platforms such as PDAs and personal computers. EA Mobile produces games in a wide variety of genres, such as fighting games, puzzle games, and sports titles. Their most well-known products to date include The Sims, Need for Speed, and FIFA as well as a mobile conversion of the widely known puzzle game Bejeweled, a conversion for Pocket PC of the PC game Worms World Party and their NFL, NBA, and MLB -branded games, in addition to holding the license for the mobile versions of Tetris and various Monopoly games. Tetris by EA Mobile is the best-selling paid mobile game of all time, and third best-selling game of all time altogether. They have relationships with all major North American wireless service carriers, such as Sprint, Verizon, and AT&T, as well as many minor North American and some major European and Asian carriers. They have offices in Los Angeles, Montreal, London, Tokyo, Hyderabad, Honolulu, Bucharest and São Paulo.

As a publishing company in the wireless video game industry, EA Mobile's primary service is linking game developers, who generally develop the games from idea to playable software, with Wireless telecommunications service providers or "carriers", who sell the games to their customers. To this end, they maintain strong relationships with major companies in both groups. In addition, they create, purchase, and maintain proprietary software libraries to aid developers with whom they have working relationships, a common practice among electronic game publishers. They also do the majority of the work regarding quality assurance for their games.

== History ==
=== Foundation ===
EA Mobile was founded in 2004 by a group of EA company veterans. The group was formed/led by John Batter (General Manager) and included Linda Chaplin (head of US sales), Lincoln Wallen (CTO), John Burn (head of European sales), Jay Miller (US sales) and Mike McCabe (head of Asian sales). EA Mobile launched the division and products simultaneously in the US, Europe and Asia.

=== JAMDAT acquisition ===
In 2006, EA Mobile expanded its footprint by acquiring JAMDAT Mobile. JAMDAT was founded by Scott Lahman and Zack Norman, two ex-Activision executives, and Austin Murray in March 2000. They were joined in November of that year by Mitch Lasky, who had also worked at Activision, who became the CEO of JAMDAT. JAMDAT went public in late 2003 and gained immediate success after the release of several The Lord of the Rings tie-in mobile games. JAMDAT acquired Montreal game studio Hexacto in May 2003, increasing its game portfolio.

On December 9, 2005, EA announced their purchase of JAMDAT for $680 million. The acquisition closed on February 14, 2006, and the JAMDAT name was retired.

=== Further expansion ===
Previous logo for EA Mobile

On August 8, 2007, it was announced that Barry Cottle will join EA Mobile as the new Senior Vice President and General Manager.

In October 2010, EA Mobile announced the acquisition of UK-based iPhone and iPad games publisher Chillingo for US$20 million in cash. While Chillingo publishes the popular Cut the Rope game, the deal did not include those properties.

In July 2015, Samantha Ryan became the new SVP and General Manager of EA Mobile replacing Frank Gibeau. And the following year in a restructuring across parent company EA, she also added oversight of Maxis and BioWare.

As of 2017, EA Mobile have an annual revenue topping almost $700 million and employees around 800 people.

In May 2022, it was announced that EA Mobile along with EA Capital Games will partner with Middle-earth Enterprises to release a new mobile RPG titled The Lord of the Rings: Heroes of Middle-earth. The game was eventually released on 10 May 2023. It received mixed to positive reviews generally, but was forced to shut down prematurely just more than a year after worldwide launch, amidst the turmoil of the 2023–2024 video game industry layoffs that affected Electronic Arts' development projects.

Months after shutting down Heroes of Middle Earth, Electronic Arts then announced the shutdown of The Simpsons: Tapped Out after twelve years of operation. The game shut down on January 24, 2025.

== Games ==
The following is a list of games developed or published by EA Mobile. Titles marked with "^{‡}" are multi-platform games that were released on other platform by other publishers, simultaneously or at a different date.

Year	Title	Developer Publisher	Notes	Ref.
2007	Harry Potter and the Order of the Phoenix ^{‡}	EA Romania, EA UK EA Mobile		
2009	Harry Potter and the Half-Blood Prince ^{‡}	EA Romania EA Mobile		
2010	Harry Potter and the Deathly Hallows – Part 1 ^{‡}	EA Romania EA Mobile		
2012	The Simpsons: Tapped Out	EA Mobile EA Mobile	Discontinued in 2024	
2016- (yearly releases)	FIFA Mobile	EA Mobile, EA Canada EA Sports	Title changed to EA Sports FC Mobile after September 25, 2023.	

== See also ==
- Gameloft
