= Harry Potter and the Order of the Phoenix (video game) =

- North American cover art
- Developers: EA UK; Rebellion Developments (PlayStation Portable); Visual Impact (Nintendo DS, Game Boy Advance); EA Romania (mobile)
- Publishers: Electronic Arts; EA Mobile (mobile)
- Composer: James Hannigan
- Series: Wizarding World
- Platforms: Mobile devices; Nintendo DS; PlayStation Portable; Microsoft Windows; PlayStation 2; PlayStation 3; Wii; Xbox 360; Game Boy Advance; Mac OS X
- Release: Mobile devices: NA: 15 June 2007; Nintendo DS, Xbox 360, PlayStation 3, PlayStation Portable, PlayStation 2, Microsoft Windows, Wii: NA: 25 June 2007; AU: 28 June 2007; EU: 29 June 2007; AU: 28 September 2007 (PS2); Game Boy Advance: NA: 10 July 2007; EU: 13 July 2007; Mac OS X: NA: 21 August 2007
- Genre: Action-adventure
- Mode: Single-player

Harry Potter and the Order of the Phoenix is a 2007 action-adventure game. It is based on the 2007 film of the same name. The game was released for mobile devices, Nintendo DS, PlayStation Portable, Microsoft Windows, PlayStation 2, PlayStation 3, Wii, Xbox 360, Game Boy Advance, and Mac OS X.

== Gameplay ==
The game presents the player with a large part of the Harry Potter universe, combining the movie blueprints, J. K. Rowling's drawings and books' descriptions to recreate known places, including the Ministry of Magic, Grimmauld Place and Little Whinging. As well as the main missions, and as part of the new sandbox style of playing, players can explore Hogwarts and interact with objects, using magical spells to earn Discovery points. One can duel Slytherins in the Entrance Courtyard, Paved Courtyard, and specific floor corridors. One can also duel throughout the story. Most of them are played as Harry. Near the end of the game’s story, the player controls both Sirius Black and Dumbledore in separate wizarding duels. Earning Discovery points increases the power of the owned spells, and earns player bonuses, such as behind-the-scenes videos and trophies, which can be viewed in the Room of Rewards. Items in the room such as trophies can also be unlocked by taking part in the various minigames, such as Exploding Snap, wizard chess and Gobstones. There are various missions to complete which follow the storyline of the film, such as the recruiting of Dumbledore's Army members, or creating havoc when Umbridge is made Headmistress.

== Development ==
The game's sandbox style provides the player with an open environment, as the player is able to move around parts of Hogwarts freely. Hogwarts in this game was modeled after the film sets rather than a recreation of the developer's own design. They recreated every single iconic background from all films and added their own unfeatured rooms.

In an interview with MTV, lead designer Chris Roberts described the game as having heavy input by Rowling. The game features Wizard games, such as "Gobstones" and "exploding snap", which were created by the developers, and later confirmed by J. K. Rowling as the official rules for those games. He also stated that she had input over some of the game's content, saying:

"And she has put her foot down when need be. Roberts and the team came up with a mission in the game that would have Harry's classmate Neville Longbottom sabotaging a clock tower to get back at Hogwarts professor Dolores Umbridge. "We got this feedback from her saying, 'I really like the mission, but I don't think Neville would do that. I think it would be Dean Thomas. He's much more likely to do it.' " They switched the mission to Dean." -- Chris Roberts speaking to Stephen Totilo for MTV

During development, certain characters from the film series visited the studio to have their faces rendered into the game; where the cast members included Rupert Grint, Katie Leung and Evanna Lynch.

== Soundtrack ==
The game's soundtrack was composed by James Hannigan and conducted by Allan Wilson. Hannigan wrote themes for the various characters and incorporated "Hedwig's Theme" by John Williams into the score. IGN has given the game's music a rating of 9.5 out of 10. A small number of tracks present in the Order of the Phoenix video game were also featured in The Philosopher's Stone, The Chamber of Secrets and The Prisoner of Azkaban video games, composed by Jeremy Soule. The Harry Potter and the Order of the Phoenix game soundtrack featuring James Hannigan's music was released on the E.A.R.S. label in 2007, with references to John Williams' "Hedwig's Theme" removed, to much critical acclaim from fans of film and game soundtracks. For reasons unknown, the soundtrack, along with Hannigan's later Harry Potter and the Half-Blood Prince soundtrack and the earlier game scores by Jeremy Soule, was withdrawn from sale in 2009. It has been speculated that market confusion involving multiple soundtracks with the same title may have led to the withdrawal, but others have speculated that reviews by various soundtrack critics describing Hannigan's work as superior to the score of the Harry Potter and the Order of the Phoenix film may have contributed to the decision. Hannigan's soundtracks for the last two games in the series were never officially released.

In 2020, the soundtrack album was re-released under the title of EA Music Composer Series: James Hannigan, Vol. 2, and many of the references to the Harry Potter series are censored in the track titles.

== Reception ==
Reception

Aggregate score
Aggregator	Score							
Aggregator	DS	GBA	PC	PS2	PS3	PSP	Wii	Xbox 360
Metacritic	51/100	50/100	63/100	61/100	67/100	52/100	69/100	68/100

Review scores
Publication	Score							
Publication	DS	GBA	PC	PS2	PS3	PSP	Wii	Xbox 360
1Up.com	N/A	N/A	N/A	N/A	B+	N/A	B+	B+
Eurogamer	N/A	N/A	N/A	N/A	N/A	N/A	N/A	5/10
Game Informer	N/A	N/A	N/A	N/A	6.5/10	N/A	6.5/10	6.5/10
GamePro	N/A	N/A	N/A	N/A	N/A	N/A	3.25/5	N/A
GameRevolution	N/A	N/A	N/A	C−	C−	N/A	C−	C−
GameSpot	5/10	5/10	5/10	5/10	5/10	5/10	5/10	5/10
GameSpy	1.5/5	N/A	N/A	N/A	4/5	2/5	4/5	4/5
GameTrailers	N/A	N/A	N/A	N/A	8/10	N/A	N/A	8/10
GameZone	5.3/10	N/A	N/A	N/A	8/10	6.8/10	8/10	7.8/10
IGN	6/10	N/A	7.3/10	7/10	7.6/10	5.5/10	7.8/10	7.6/10
Nintendo Power	7/10	N/A	N/A	N/A	N/A	N/A	7/10	N/A
Official Xbox Magazine (US)	N/A	N/A	N/A	N/A	N/A	N/A	N/A	7.5/10
PC Gamer (US)	N/A	N/A	59%	N/A	N/A	N/A	N/A	N/A

The game itself received "mixed or average" reviews, according to video game review aggregator platform Metacritic. (Note: Metacritic scores for: Nintendo DS: 51%, Game Boy Advance: 50%, PC: 63%, PlayStation 2: 61%, PlayStation 3: 67%, PlayStation Portable: 52%, Wii: 69%, and Xbox 360: 68%) The game's best scores came from the seventh generation of video game consoles, with the Wii version scoring the highest overall at 69%. Reviewers were particularly pleased with how the Wii Remote controlled the game, but claimed the game's design was poor.

Greg Damiano of Game Revolution was very critical of the game, saying "One-on-one duels are dreadfully easy, and the occasional free-for-alls are an unplayable chaos" Damiano was also critical of how the plot of the novel is played out in the game, "plot points are introduced and quickly forgotten in an impressively senseless flurry." The game's music was one of the few positive points for the game, with Damiano saying "At least the musical score rocks out with a full orchestra, with songs from the film and a very appealing flow of music overall. Twenty-two actors from the film lend their voices to the game, though some of the performances (unfortunately including Harry’s) sound flat and phoned-in"

Hyper's Daniel Wilks however, commended the Wii game for its "great looks, the Wii-wand and in-game exploration". However, he criticised it for its "repetitive quests and poor waypoints". Phil Theobald of GameSpy was also positive about the game's design, and the Wii version, saying "The Wii controls are quite a bit of fun" and concluded that whilst "the 360 and PS3 versions looks quite a bit better" the "Wii version certainly doesn't look bad."

Charles Herold of The New York Times gave it a mixed review and stated that the game "has an unfinished feel, as though the game’s designers stuck in a placeholder for game play, planning to flesh it out later, only to run out of time."
