= Harry Potter and the Half-Blood Prince (video game) =

2009 video game

Harry Potter and the Half Blood Prince
- Cover art
- Developers: EA Bright Light; EA Romania (mobile)
- Publishers: Electronic Arts; EA Mobile (mobile)
- Composer: James Hannigan
- Series: Wizarding World
- Platforms: Mobile devices; Nintendo DS; PlayStation Portable; Microsoft Windows; PlayStation 2; PlayStation 3; Wii; Xbox 360; Mac OS X
- Release: NA: 30 June 2009; AU: 2 July 2009; EU: 3 July 2009
- Genre: Action-adventure
- Modes: Single-player, multiplayer

Harry Potter and the Half-Blood Prince is a 2009 action-adventure game. It is based on the film of the same name. The game was released on 30 June 2009 for mobile devices, Nintendo DS, PlayStation Portable, Microsoft Windows, PlayStation 2, PlayStation 3, Wii, Xbox 360, and Mac OS X.

== Gameplay ==
Half-Blood Prince features the exploration of Hogwarts and casting spells on objects around the school, similar to its predecessor, Order of the Phoenix. The game also includes multiplayer games, classes, different times of day, Quidditch, Wizard Duels and Potion making. The Marauder's Map is included in the game, with progress opening other parts of the school. Harry can also call Nearly Headless Nick to show him around the school. Harry is the main playable character in the game, but Ron and Ginny are also available in two levels. The first has Ron concentrate on following Harry after taking a Love Potion (if he does not follow Harry, the mission fails). The second has Ginny fill in for Harry for Quidditch when he gets detention and play against the rival Seeker, Cho Chang.

As Dumbledore mentions, the Duelling Club begins. Harry is allowed to duel freely with students and learn spells from them. The Gryffindor Duelling Club is located in the Great Hall, while the other Houses' are in other places, including the Paved Courtyard, Training Ground, and Transfiguration Courtyard.

As Harry attends Potions class, mixing ingredients to make potions is done with the Wii Remote or analogue stick. Harry must also join the Potions Club, which is in the Herbology classroom. Potions ingredients surround the cauldron on the workbench, and through visual symbols that pop up on the screen, the instructions must be followed to complete the potion.

Harry is also named Quidditch Captain. Other members on the team are Ginny Weasley, Ron Weasley, and Katie Bell. They all participate in try-outs and in the Quidditch Cup against Slytherin, Hufflepuff, and Ravenclaw. When Harry has detention, Ginny is the Seeker, while Dean takes her spot. When Ron is in the hospital, Cormac McLaggen takes his spot on the team.

During the game, there are 150 crests to collect that are found throughout Hogwarts Castle. The crests can be found by casting spells such as Reparo if they are broken on the ground or by using Wingardium Leviosa to throw an object at one if it is on a wall or an unreachable place. Crests can also be gained by collecting mini-crests, which are located in lamps and banisters. There are also 10 crests given when a specific miniquest is completed by the player.

The school grounds are nearly identical to the previous installment. Some new areas are added, including the entrance to Hogwarts. Other areas previously accessible are now inaccessible due to the new security of Hogwarts added by the Aurors.

=== Platform-specific elements ===
The Wii version of the game utilises the Wii Remote features as it did in the Harry Potter and the Order of the Phoenix video game, which include brewing potions, wizard dueling and Quidditch. However, it does not support the new Wii MotionPlus technology which was released in the same month. The Nintendo DS version includes mini-games such as Gobstones and Exploding Snap. The game once again utilises the Stylus for wizard duels, potion making and Quidditch. The PlayStation 3 version includes DualShock 3 vibration. The PlayStation 2, PC, and Xbox 360 versions use the same functions as with the previous game.

=== Cast ===
Several members of the Harry Potter film series lent their voices (some for the first time) to their characters in game. Among these, Rupert Grint played Ron Weasley, Bonnie Wright played Ginny Weasley, Warwick Davis played Professor Flitwick, and Tom Felton played Draco Malfoy.

== Plot ==
In Harry Potter and the Half-Blood Prince, Dumbledore prepares Harry for the final battle that he knows is fast approaching as Voldemort is tightening his grip on both the Muggle and wizarding worlds. Together they work to find the key to unlock Voldemort's defences, and to this end, Dumbledore recruits his old friend and colleague, the well-connected and unsuspecting bon vivant Professor Horace Slughorn, whom he believes holds crucial information.

== Soundtrack ==
Harry Potter and the Half-Blood Prince Video Game Soundtrack

Soundtrack album by James Hannigan
- Released: 17 March 2009
- Recorded: 8 August 2008 at Air Studios
- Genre: Video game music
- Length: 52:18
- Label: EA Recordings
- Producer: James Hannigan

James Hannigan chronology
Harry Potter and the Order of the Phoenix Video Game Soundtrack (2007)	Harry Potter and the Half-Blood Prince Video Game Soundtrack (2009)

The Harry Potter and the Half-Blood Prince Video Game Soundtrack was composed by James Hannigan and recorded with the Philharmonia Orchestra at Air Studios in London. The BAFTA-nominated and IFMCA (International Film Music Critics Association) Award-winning soundtrack was released on 17 March 2009. However, the soundtrack is no longer available because EA Recordings decided to stop selling all of their Harry Potter video game soundtracks in late 2009. Hannigan's soundtracks for the last two games in the series were never officially released.

In 2020, the soundtrack album was re-released under the title of EA Music Composer Series: James Hannigan, Vol. 1, and many of the references to the Harry Potter series are censored in the track titles.

Professional ratings
Review scores
Source	Rating
Music 4 Games	link
Soundtrack Geek	link

=== Track listing ===
1. "Return to Hogwarts" - 3:25
2. "Quidditch Tryouts" - 1:31
3. "Wandering Night" - 2:44
4. "Race Ginny" - 3:02
5. "Duelling Club" - 2:04
6. "Mixing Potions" - 1:58
7. "Slytherin Combat" - 2:21
8. "Slughorn" - 0:39
9. "Hogwarts by Night" - 1:45
10. "Quidditch" - 3:30
11. "Get to Potions" - 1:49
12. "Get to Quidditch" - 1:20
13. "Fred and George Return" - 1:28
14. "Wandering Day 5" - 1:02
15. "Lovesick Ron" - 2:49
16. "The Boathouse at Night" - 2:49
17. "Wandering Stealth" - 2:19
18. "Loss at Hogwarts" - 1:09
19. "Bellatrix" - 1:17
20. "Fenrir Battle" - 1:13
21. "Wandering Day 4" - 1:35
22. "Chase Draco" - 1:07
23. "More Potions" - 1:37
24. "Exploring with Luna" - 2:29
25. "Wandering Day 3" - 1:47
26. "Wandering Day 1" - 0:54
27. "The Final Battles" - 3:41
28. "Sadness at Hogwarts" - 2:00
29. "Friendship Theme" - 2:14

== Release ==
When the game was announced in April 2008 its release date was to coincide with the film's release date, which was originally 21 November 2008, but it was announced in August 2008 that the film would be delayed by eight months. It was afterward announced that the video game would also be delayed to coincide with the film's July 2009 release date. Through a press release on 14 May 2009 it was confirmed that the release date for the game was 30 June 2009.

== Reception ==
Reception

Aggregate score
Aggregator	Score						
Aggregator	DS	PC	PS2	PS3	PSP	Wii	Xbox 360
Metacritic	48/100	64/100	65/100	66/100	51/100	60/100	64/100

Review scores
Publication	Score						
Publication	DS	PC	PS2	PS3	PSP	Wii	Xbox 360
1Up.com	N/A	N/A	N/A	C	N/A	C	N/A
Game Informer	N/A	N/A	N/A	7/10	N/A	7/10	7/10
GamePro	N/A	N/A	N/A	N/A	N/A	2.5/5	N/A
GameSpot	N/A	N/A	N/A	5/10	N/A	5/10	N/A
GameSpy	N/A	N/A	N/A	N/A	N/A	2/5	N/A
GameTrailers	N/A	N/A	N/A	N/A	N/A	5.4/10	N/A
GameZone	N/A	N/A	N/A	6.9/10	N/A	7/10	6.9/10
IGN	4.3/10	7.5/10	N/A	7.7/10	4.3/10	(US) 7.7/10 (UK) 5/10	7.7/10
Nintendo Power	N/A	N/A	N/A	N/A	N/A	5.5/10	N/A
Official Xbox Magazine (US)	N/A	N/A	N/A	N/A	N/A	N/A	5/10
PC Gamer (UK)	N/A	55%	N/A	N/A	N/A	N/A	N/A
The Daily Telegraph	N/A	N/A	N/A	N/A	N/A	6/10	N/A

The game received "mixed or average" reviews on all platforms except the DS version, which received "generally unfavorable reviews", according to video game review aggregator platform Metacritic.

IGN, in a positive 7.7/10 rating review of the PlayStation 3, Xbox 360 and Wii versions and 7.5/10 for the PC version, said, “Harry Potter and the Half-Blood Prince improves on the stuff I liked in its predecessor and makes for a pretty fun game.” GamePro admitted that the Wii version was a “fun” game to play but did not feel that it was worth the price of a new release. IT Reviews said that “Repetition is evident - at one point you fight five wand duels in a row, which gets a little tiresome - and many quests are just plain uninteresting.” They concluded the game was too short, and wouldn't “keep anyone but the most avid Potter fan happy for long.”

Tom McShea of GameSpot disliked the gameplay, story, character models and voice acting, saying that: "The game is ultimately a forgettable experience, pushing players through the same three minigames over and over again, without ever capturing the thrill of being a wizard." McShea scored the PS3 and Wii versions a 5/10.
