= Harry Potter and the Deathly Hallows – Part 1 (video game) =

2010 video game

- Cover art
- Developers: EA Bright Light; Full Fat (Nintendo DS); EA Romania (mobile)
- Publishers: Electronic Arts; EA Mobile (mobile)
- Composer: James Hannigan
- Series: Wizarding World
- Platforms: Mobile devices; Nintendo DS; Microsoft Windows; PlayStation 3; Wii; Xbox 360
- Release: NA: 16 November 2010; AU: 18 November 2010; EU: 19 November 2010
- Genre: Action-adventure
- Mode: Single-player

Harry Potter and the Deathly Hallows – Part 1 is a 2010 action-adventure game. It is based on the 2010 film of the same name. It was released on 16 November 2010 in the United States, 18 November 2010 in Australia, and on 19 November 2010 in Europe and India. The game was released for mobile devices, Nintendo DS, Microsoft Windows, PlayStation 3, Wii, Xbox 360.

The game follows protagonists Harry Potter, Ron Weasley and Hermione Granger, who set out to destroy the seven Horcruxes which will help them to defeat Lord Voldemort, the game's antagonist. It is the first Harry Potter game to be rated T for teen by ESRB. The game received generally negative reviews from critics, who praised its tone but criticized its gameplay, repetitive combat and overly basic structure, while the DS version received mixed reviews.

== Gameplay ==
=== PC and console ===
The game makes extensive use of a cover system similar to that of Gears of War.

The gameplay for Harry Potter and the Deathly Hallows – Part 1 is different from the previous games after developers decided it required a new direction to suit its growing adult audience. The player controls the character Harry Potter from a third-person over-the-shoulder camera, and is played in the style of a third-person shooter. The Deathly Hallows – Part 1 game includes a progression system where Harry gains experience and can upgrade his spells.

Combat in Deathly Hallows Part 1 involves button or keyboard presses or mouse clicks to cast spells. The player is able to change the spells by selecting the spell wheel. The spells also have an effect on enemies and the environment with the player being able to use Wingardium Leviosa to throw objects at other players or to clear paths and the Confundo spell being able to make the enemy fight for the player (which is used in a sniper point of view). Head shots are also a feature in the game with the player being able to control Harry to aim a spell at their opponent's head. Part of the combat sequences involve the cover system where the player hides behind an obstacle, until it has been destroyed, to avoid receiving damage from their opponent.

Throughout the game the player can collect magical items and potions which can be used by pressing the directional buttons on the d-pad or pushing keys on the keyboard.

During stealth missions the player can progress through the level using the Polyjuice Potion, Peruvian Instant Darkness Powder or the Invisibility Cloak. While manoeuvring under the Invisibility Cloak the player must move slowly to ensure the stealth meter, on the bottom right hand corner of the screen, does not turn red. If the meter has turned red it means the player is in danger of getting caught and must stay still until the meter has re-generated. When the player gets close enough to an enemy while under the Invisibility Cloak they are able to cast a stunning spell at them, or use the shield charm as a knock-out melee attack.

=== Handheld ===
The Nintendo DS version is played in the puzzle based gameplay. The game shows a map of the area on the top screen, and a 3D top-down view of Harry and his nearby surroundings on the lower touchscreen. In the game the player controls Harry Potter with the stylus, moves him by dragging the stylus to the sides of the screen, and uses the stylus to equip spells and objects or attack enemies by tapping on them. In addition to the main character, Ron and/or Hermione are present to aide in combat. Although these characters are computer-controlled, they will attack the same enemy Harry targets. Additionally Ron and Hermione have their own abilities; Hermione can use the spell "Arresto Momento" which slows enemies down, and Ron uses a "Deluminator" which can extinguish lights. The game also features a multi-player mode where two players, using Wi-Fi connectivity, can play against each other with one player guiding Harry Potter to hunt for magic points, while the other controls three Dementors who try to hunt him down. In the game the player aims to get the highest score.

=== Kinect mode ===
Deathly Hallows Part 1 has side missions which use Kinect for the Xbox 360. The missions include battling against Death Eaters and Snatchers in environments from the game. The two-player missions are played in on-rails shooter mode, where the player casts spells through hand and body gestures. By progressing through the levels the player aims to achieve the highest score which is then posted on Xbox Live.

== Development ==
"The final Harry Potter adventure has given us the opportunity to make a darker and more action-oriented game than we have before. We believe we are creating a Harry Potter game that the HD console gaming generation will appreciate and enjoy. We have built new technology specifically to allow us to prove that magic is a truly potent force and, in this game, players will need to use all their skills if they want to survive."

— Jonathan Bunney, EA Bright Light's Head of Production.

On February 8, 2010, EA announced their title line-ups for the year with a Harry Potter title slated for the third quarter of the year. On June 1, 2010, EA and Warner Bros. Interactive Entertainment officially announced Harry Potter and the Deathly Hallows – Part 1 was in development to be released alongside the film in autumn of 2010. Prior to the game's announcement, EA had launched a campaign through the social networking website, Facebook, where users could "like" the page and therefore eventually reveal the first image which depicted the characters Harry, Ron and Hermione in a forest with their wands pointed at the Snatchers. A teaser trailer was released online after the game's announcement in a build-up to the E3 Conference showcasing the battle sequences and gameplay. The first box art to be released for the video game depicted an empty foggy forest with the title in the middle and the official box art depicted the same image but with Harry Potter running with his wand pointed in front of him and Voldemort's eyes peering over the top .

According to the game's creative director, Matt Birch, they had built a brand new game engine to harness the game's demands and new available technologies and will also use Facial Action Coding System (FACS) for the first time. High resolution head scans of the main cast of the film were made as well as photo shots in different angles and lighting to capture every facial detail.

=== Soundtrack ===
The score to Harry Potter and the Deathly Hallows Part 1 was led by James Hannigan, his third Harry Potter video game soundtrack. During an interview with Squareenixmusic.com's Greg O'Connor Read he was asked if he would return for the last game to which he had stated "I'd love to return to the series[...]", and when asked how he would end it he said "[...] it would be great to end the series with a bang!". It was recorded, like its predecessor, with The Philharmonia Orchestra at AIR Studios in London, while the soundtrack was first unveiled on 28 October 2010 at St Mary's Church, Nottingham where Hannigan performed several tracks with the Pinewood Singers. The main theme for the soundtrack was made available for download on the game's official website on 8 November 2010. However, the full soundtrack was never officially released because the previous six soundtracks in the series were previously taken down digital stores for unknown reasons. Hannigan described the music from the game as dark, "[...] largely following similar changes in the underlying story – but is not without its lighter moments[...]".

== Reception ==
Harry Potter and the Deathly Hallows – Part 1

Aggregate score
Aggregator	Score
Metacritic	(DS) 56/100 (Wii) 41/100 (X360) 38/100 (PS3) 38/100 (PC) 37/100

Review scores
Publication	Score
1Up.com	D
Edge	3/10
Eurogamer	3/10
Game Informer	5.5/10
GamePro	1.5/5
GameSpot	5/10
GameTrailers	6.4/10
GameZone	(DS) 4/10 (X360) 3/10
IGN	(X360) 2.5/10; 2/10
Joystiq	1/5
Nintendo Power	4/10
Official Xbox Magazine (US)	6.5/10
Play	21%
The Escapist	2/5
The Guardian	2/5

Harry Potter and the Deathly Hallows Part 1 received generally negative reviews from critics. GameSpot awarded the game 5 out of 10 and said "While the third-person shooter aspect of Harry's latest adventure can be fun, the game's story elements fail to live up to those of its literary namesake." IGN gave the PS3 and Wii versions of the game an even lower score of 2 and the Xbox 360 version a 2.5, citing various gameplay issues, as well as the storyline being loosely related to the film and novel. Official Nintendo Magazine awarded the Wii version of the game 60% and called it "An engaging attempt to apparate Harry into action gaming, but also a flawed one.” While it does have its moments, its graphics are downgraded making it seem clunkier than the PS3 and Xbox 360 versions and the awkward Wii remote mechanics cause the shooting sections to be tedious for most players. Game Informer awarded it 5.5 out of 10 and said "Like a Quidditch player falling from a broomstick mid-match, this installment loses all forward momentum and goes plummeting toward a faceplant at top speed". VideoGamer.com awarded it 5 out of ten and said "It's a impressively dark film tie-in, and an ambitious one at that, but don't expect anything more."

The Guardian gave the game a score of two stars out of five and said that "when you play [Deathly Hallows Part 1], you get the feeling that everyone involved with the franchise will be secretly relieved when the whole juggernaut finally grinds to a permanent halt." The Escapist also gave it two stars out of five and said, "If you want to stare at the back of Harry's head while he shouts "Stupefy!" forty times a minute, this is the game for you. If not, then you'd better look elsewhere."
