= Harry Potter and the Philosopher's Stone (PlayStation video game) =

2001 video game

- European box art
- Developer: Argonaut Games
- Publisher: Electronic Arts
- Producer: Jamie Walker
- Designer: Stephen Jarrett
- Programmer: Ben Wyatt
- Artist: Wayne Billingham
- Writers: Guy Miller; Simon Phipps
- Composer: Jeremy Soule
- Series: Harry Potter
- Platform: PlayStation
- Release: WW: 16 November 2001
- Genre: Action-adventure
- Mode: Single-player

Harry Potter and the Philosopher's Stone (released in the United States as Harry Potter and the Sorcerer's Stone) is a 2001 action-adventure video game developed by Argonaut Games and published by Electronic Arts for the PlayStation. Based on the 1997 novel of the same name (as well as its 2001 film adaptation), the player controls Harry Potter, who must navigate his first year in the Hogwarts School of Witchcraft and Wizardry and eventually confront the villainous Lord Voldemort.

The PlayStation version, which was released simultaneously with the Game Boy Advance and Game Boy Color versions, was developed concurrently with those versions with input from Harry Potter author J.K. Rowling and the producers of the film to ensure a consistent presentation. The game received mixed reviews, with critics praising the faithful recreation of the Harry Potter universe and some gameplay elements, while criticizing its technical limitations, simplistic mechanics, and lack of depth. The PlayStation version sold 8 million copies by May 2003, making it the sixth best-selling PlayStation video game of all time.

== Gameplay ==
In this example of gameplay from Harry Potter and the Philosopher's Stone, Harry is being pursued by a mountain troll.

Harry Potter and the Philosopher's Stone is an action-adventure game with platformer elements. The player controls Harry Potter, guiding him through a narrative reflecting that of the novel. The gameplay focuses on exploration, puzzle-solving, and spell-casting within Hogwarts, with additional minigames like Quidditch. A jump button is absent, with Harry automatically leaping when approaching ledges. Harry can collect Bertie Bott's Every Flavour Beans scattered around the school grounds. Beans can be exchanged with Fred and George Weasley for passwords, which can uncover rewards like the Nimbus 2000. Harry can also collect Famous Witches and Wizards cards, often hidden in secret areas accessed by interacting with environmental objects.

Spells are a central mechanic, learned through Simon-style button sequence minigames during magic classes. Spells like Flipendo (a basic projectile) and Incendio (for burning objects) are cast using context-sensitive sparkles that indicate targets and automatically select the appropriate spell. Casting requires timing button presses, with failure resulting in restarting the sequence. The targeting system allows players to aim spells using either a first-person view or a lock-on feature with strafing capability.

Quidditch involves flying on a broomstick to chase a Golden Snitch through preset rings, with three phases: flying through rings alone, racing rival Seekers, and catching the Snitch. Upon reaching a certain point in the game, the player can access a Quidditch Cup from the main menu, in which the player partakes in a competition against progressively harder teams.

== Plot ==
A half-giant, Rubeus Hagrid, leaves the orphaned infant Harry Potter with his maternal aunt's family. Eleven years later, Harry is invited to attend the Hogwarts School of Witchcraft and Wizardry. Upon his arrival, Harry is sorted into the Gryffindor house, where he resides and studies through the year. Harry befriends Ron Weasley and Hermione Granger and they partake in a competition between the houses of Hogwarts to win the House Cup upon the year's end, in which points are granted for satisfactory performance and detracted for infractions.

While sneaking through a forbidden corridor, Harry witnesses Professor Severus Snape conversing with Argus Filch about an object being guarded in the corridor he has been eyeing intently. Harry subsequently happens upon the Mirror of Erised, in which he sees his parents. The headmaster Albus Dumbledore appears and explains that the mirror reflects a person's deepest desire. He says that the mirror will be moved to a new home shortly, but adds ominously that Harry will be prepared if he sees it again. Harry, Ron and Hermione learn from Hagrid that Nicolas Flamel is involved with the object in the forbidden corridor, which is guarded by a giant three-headed dog named Fluffy. Harry later joins Hagrid in an investigation of an attack on a unicorn in the adjacent forest and encounters a figure drinking a dead unicorn's blood. He is rescued by a centaur, who explains that unicorn's blood can maintain the life of someone close to death, and Harry realizes that the figure is his parents' killer, Lord Voldemort.

Hermione's research reveals that Nicolas Flamel's creation, the Philosopher's Stone, can produce an elixir that grants immortality. She suspects that Snape is after the Stone and discloses rumours that Voldemort is also involved, prompting Harry, Ron and Hermione to act. Harry soothes Fluffy to sleep with a flute gifted to him by Hagrid, and the three friends make their way through the trapdoor. They traverse through obstacles put in place by the school's professors, but ultimately only Harry can proceed. In the final room, Harry once more finds the Mirror of Erised, which materializes the Philosopher's Stone into his pocket. He is confronted by Professor Quirinus Quirrell under the command of Voldemort, who has manifested as a face on the back of Quirrell's head and tries to kill Harry for the Stone, but the final battle ends with Voldemort's defeat.

Harry awakes in the school's infirmary, where Dumbledore discloses that the Philosopher's Stone has been destroyed, but shares Harry's concern that its loss will not prevent Voldemort's return. At the school's end-of-year banquet, Dumbledore announces that Harry's acts of nerve and courage have won Gryffindor enough points to win them the House Cup.

== Development and release ==
On 10 August 2000, Electronic Arts announced that it had acquired the video game rights to the Harry Potter franchise. The license was showcased at E3 2001, with titles for the Game Boy Color, Game Boy Advance, PlayStation, and the PC scheduled for November 2001. The PlayStation version was developed by Argonaut Games as an action-platform game which integrated a 3D environment into its gameplay, using the game engine they had previously developed for the Croc games.

The game was produced by Jamie Walker, designed by Stephen Jarrett, and programmed by Ben Wyatt, with Wayne Billingham and Gary Bendelow serving as lead artist and lead animator, respectively. Guy Miller and Simon Phipps wrote and edited the script and dialogue, while Jeremy Soule composed the music. The soundtrack was released digitally in 2006.

The PlayStation version, along with the Game Boy Color and Game Boy Advance versions, was designed with input from Harry Potter author J.K. Rowling and the producers of the film adaptation to ensure that all three versions shared a consistent presentation. The PlayStation version was released with the other two versions in North America on 16 November 2001.

== Reception ==
Reception

Aggregate score
Aggregator	Score
Metacritic	64/100

Review scores
Publication	Score
Electronic Gaming Monthly	4.5/10, 6.5/10, 6/10
EP Daily	6/10
Game Informer	5.5/10
GamePro	3.5/5
GameSpot	4/10
IGN	8/10
Official U.S. PlayStation Magazine	3/5

Harry Potter and the Philosopher's Stone received "mixed or average" reviews according to review aggregator platform Metacritic. Reviewers unanimously agreed the game was primarily for younger players and Harry Potter fans. Jeremy Conrad of IGN and Joe Rybicki of Official U.S. PlayStation Magazine noted some appeal for older adventure fans, but Mark MacDonald of Electronic Gaming Monthly (EGM), Matt Helgeson of Game Informer, and Gerald Villoria of GameSpot explicitly called it a children's title, with simplistic mechanics and a short duration (around seven hours, per EGM's Crispin Boyer) limiting broader appeal. Sean Miller of The Electric Playground argued it would fail to satisfy either young or older audiences due to its flaws.

Reviewers generally agreed that the game successfully recreated the Hogwarts setting, capturing its scale and atmosphere to some extent. Conrad, Rybicki, Villoria, and GamePro's Air Hendrix praised the large, explorable castle and its fidelity to the books' spirit, with moments like attending classes or meeting characters that would resonate with fans. However, Miller strongly disagreed, calling the environments bland, lifeless, and failing to capture Hogwarts' vibrant, magical essence due to PlayStation limitations.

The gameplay was widely criticized as simplistic, repetitive, and lacking depth, particularly for older players. Reviewers described the platforming, puzzles, and minigames as cliché or dull. Helgeson and Villoria heavily criticized the auto-jump mechanic for removing challenge, though Rybicki praised it for reducing frustration. Conrad was an outlier, appreciating the responsive controls and Zelda-like adventure elements, though he acknowledged the game's non-epic scope.

Quidditch was a highly anticipated feature but largely disappointing. Conrad found it a highlight despite wanting more depth, and Helgeson called it fun. However, Miller, Villoria, and Boyer criticized its temperamental controls, choppy visuals, and restrictive ring-chasing mechanics, which diminished excitement. Reviewers agreed it failed to fully capture the sport's potential, with Conrad and Villoria suggesting a standalone Quidditch game could be better.

The graphics received mixed feedback, with technical limitations often highlighted. Conrad praised the sharp textures and spell effects for a PlayStation game, and Rybicki noted appealing environments. However, Miller, Villoria, and MacDonald criticized bland, blocky visuals, jagged polygons, and framerate issues, especially during Quidditch. Slowdown and camera problems further hampered the experience for Conrad, Rybicki, and EGM's Shane Bettenhausen.

The spell-casting mechanic was a relative strength, with Conrad and Miller praising its unique, context-sensitive system and progression, which Miller claimed would make players feel like apprentice wizards. Rybicki also appreciated the variety of spells. However, Villoria noted the spell-casting sequences were forgettable. The game's significant story deviations from the book and film were both a strength and weakness. Rybicki and Boyer appreciated new plot points for variety, but Miller, Villoria, and Bettenhausen criticized the disjointed narrative and dull new tasks, with Bettenhausen warning disappointment for fans expecting fidelity. Conrad found it loosely faithful, maintaining the books' spirit. The voice acting was a strong point, with Conrad, Villoria, Rybicki, and MacDonald praising the use of British accents and decent performances, especially for characters like Snape. The music received mixed feedback: Conrad found it fitting, but Villoria criticized its sparse, unremarkable presence compared to the PC version's superior score.

== Sales and awards ==
In its debut month, Harry Potter and the Philosopher's Stone was the highest selling PlayStation game and 6th best-selling home and handheld console game in the United States. On the following month, it remained on the best selling home and handheld console game list as the best selling PlayStation game. It was the country's 15th best-selling home and handheld console game of 2001 as well as the fourth best-selling PlayStation game, having sold 761,263 copies by the end of the year.

By May 2003, the game sold eight million copies, making it the sixth best-selling PlayStation game and one of the best-selling video games of all time at that point. The PlayStation version received a "Platinum" sales award from the Entertainment and Leisure Software Publishers Association (ELSPA), indicating sales of at least 300,000 copies in the United Kingdom.

The PlayStation version of Harry Potter and the Philosopher's Stone received a nomination from the Academy of Interactive Arts & Sciences for "Console Family Game of the Year" at the 5th Annual Interactive Achievement Awards.
