= Harry Potter and the Chamber of Secrets (video game) =

2002 video games

- Developers: EA UK (PS2); Eurocom (Xbox, GC, GBA); Argonaut Games (PS); KnowWonder (Windows); Griptonite Games (GB Color); Westlake Interactive (Mac)
- Publishers: Electronic Arts; Aspyr (Mac)
- Composer: Jeremy Soule
- Series: Wizarding World
- Engine: Unreal 1 (Windows)
- Platforms: Game Boy Color; Game Boy Advance; PlayStation; Windows; Mac OS X; PlayStation 2; Xbox; GameCube
- Release: WW: 15 November 2002; KR: March 5, 2003 (Xbox); Mac OS X: WW: 16 April 2003
- Genre: Action-adventure
- Mode: Single-player

Harry Potter and the Chamber of Secrets is the title of a series of action-adventure games released in 2002 for multiple platforms. Based on J. K. Rowling’s novel and the film adaptation, the games were published by Electronic Arts but developed by different studios for each system. Versions were released for the PlayStation 2, Xbox, GameCube, Game Boy Advance, Game Boy Color, Windows, and macOS. Although they share the same name and source material, the individual releases differ substantially in design, including unique gameplay mechanics, level layouts, and features.

== Gameplay ==
The game's core gameplay is straightforward. Taking control of Harry, the player explores Hogwarts castle and grounds. Throughout the course of the game, the player will encounter events that tie into the storyline of the second book. Filling the gaps between these events are various classes, where the player will learn how to fly a broomstick and learn new spells for combating bosses, among other things. Each new spell is accompanied by a challenge, which the player must get through in a certain amount of time to complete that class period. During the later parts of the game, the player will face challenges which are not time-limited and are not related to learning spells. These challenges are all based on events from the book, for example, travelling into the Forbidden Forest and gathering ingredients for a potion Hermione is making.

== Versions ==
=== PlayStation ===
The PlayStation version of the game is a sequel to the Harry Potter and the Philosopher's Stone game and was also developed by Argonaut Games. It retains many elements and graphics from its predecessor but with some places in Hogwarts being modified as well as new mini-games that are introduced as the storyline progresses. Most of the new spells learned from attending classes are upgrades from the previous game.

=== PlayStation 2, Xbox, and GameCube ===
Developed by EA UK and Eurocom, the GameCube, PlayStation 2 and Xbox versions of the game allow the player to access a broom and enter free-flight mode. While the PlayStation 2 version allows the player to land anywhere they want, in the Xbox and GameCube version the landing zones are limited. In the GameCube version, there is an exclusive feature involving GC–GBA connectivity that allows a secret room to be opened when the two versions are connected.

=== Windows and Mac ===
The Microsoft Windows and Mac version of the game was developed by KnowWonder and Westlake Interactive. The game features the same graphics and character design as the Philosopher's Stone (PC). It retains some of the spells learned in the previous game and involves the player learning new spells by attending more classes at Hogwarts.

=== Game Boy Color ===
Developed by Griptonite Games, the Game Boy Color version is a role-playing game. Harry Potter, Ron Weasley, Hermione Granger and Gilderoy Lockhart are all playable characters at various points in the game.

=== Game Boy Advance ===
Developed by Eurocom, the Game Boy Advance version has the fewest spells and is mostly made up of mini-quests.

== Reception ==
Reception

Aggregate score
Aggregator	Score						
Aggregator	GBA	GBC	GameCube	PC	PS	PS2	Xbox
Metacritic	76/100	N/A	77/100	77/100	N/A	71/100	77/100

Review scores
Publication	Score						
Publication	GBA	GBC	GameCube	PC	PS	PS2	Xbox
AllGame	N/A	N/A	N/A	N/A	N/A	3.5/5	N/A
Electronic Gaming Monthly	8/10	N/A	7.33/10	N/A	N/A	7.5/10	N/A
Game Informer	N/A	N/A	N/A	N/A	N/A	6/10	N/A
GamePro	3/5	3.5/5	3.5/5	N/A	N/A	3/5	3.5/5
GameSpot	7/10	N/A	7.3/10	N/A	N/A	7.3/10	7.3/10
GameSpy	N/A	N/A	N/A	3/5	N/A	N/A	N/A
GameZone	7.2/10	N/A	8.8/10	7.5/10	N/A	9/10	8.8/10
IGN	7.8/10	N/A	8.9/10	8/10	N/A	8.4/10	8.7/10
Nintendo Power	4/5	3.6/5	4.4/5	N/A	N/A	N/A	N/A
Official U.S. PlayStation Magazine	N/A	N/A	N/A	N/A	3/5	3.5/5	N/A
Official Xbox Magazine (US)	N/A	N/A	N/A	N/A	N/A	N/A	7.5/10
PC Gamer (US)	N/A	N/A	N/A	75%	N/A	N/A	N/A
Entertainment Weekly	N/A	N/A	B+	N/A	N/A	B+	B+

The game received "generally favorable" reviews, according to review aggregator platform Metacritic. Entertainment Weekly gave it a B+.

=== Sales ===
The Xbox version received a platinum family hits edition for selling over 100,000 copies. The musical score for the game, created by Jeremy Soule, was awarded a BAFTA Games Award for Best Score, Game Music Category. During the 6th Annual Interactive Achievement Awards, the Academy of Interactive Arts & Sciences nominated Chamber of Secrets for "Family Game of the Year", which was ultimately awarded to Mario Party 4.

In the United States, The Chamber of Secrets' Game Boy Advance version sold 970,000 copies and earned $25 million by August 2006. During the period between January 2000 and August 2006, it was the 18th highest-selling game launched for the Game Boy Advance, Nintendo DS or PlayStation Portable in that country.

By July 2006, the PlayStation 2 version of Chamber of Secrets had sold 700,000 copies and earned $28 million in the United States. Next Generation ranked it as the 89th highest-selling game launched for the PlayStation 2, Xbox or GameCube between January 2000 and July 2006 in that country. Combined console sales of the Harry Potter line reached 3 million units in the United States by July 2006. The PlayStation 2 version also received a "Platinum" sales award from the Entertainment and Leisure Software Publishers Association (ELSPA), indicating sales of at least 300,000 copies in the United Kingdom. The game sold 9 million copies by 2003 and generated $500 million in revenue.
