= Hagrid =

Harry Potter character

Rubeus Hagrid
- Harry Potter character
- Robbie Coltrane as Hagrid (Note: Harry Potter and the Chamber of Secrets (2002))
- First appearance: Harry Potter and the Philosopher's Stone (1997)
- Created by: J. K. Rowling
- Portrayed by: Robbie Coltrane (Note: Harry Potter film series); Nick Frost (Note: Harry Potter TV series)

In-universe information
- Species: Half-giant
- Family: Fridwulfa (mother); Grawp (half-brother)
- Nationality: English
- House: Gryffindor
- Born: 6 December 1928

Rubeus Hagrid (/ˈruːbiəs ˈhæɡrɪd/), often known simply as Hagrid, is a fictional character in the Harry Potter series of novels by J. K. Rowling. He was introduced in Harry Potter and the Philosopher's Stone (1997) as a half-giant who is the gamekeeper and groundskeeper at the wizarding school Hogwarts. He is a member of the Order of the Phoenix and eventually becomes the Care of Magical Creatures professor. Hagrid is portrayed by Robbie Coltrane in all eight Harry Potter films produced and distributed by Warner Bros. Pictures between 2001 and 2011, and is set to portrayed by Nick Frost in HBO's TV series, scheduled to start airing in December 2026.

== Creation and development ==
Rubeus Hagrid was one of the first characters Rowling created. In a 1999 interview, she explained that the name "Hagrid" is an Old English word derived from hagridden, meaning 'tormented by hags'. She said it means "you'd had a bad night" and she explained that Hagrid "has a lot of bad nights" due to his heavy drinking. In Latin, "Rubeus" means "red", and was chosen because Rowling conceived of Hagrid as an "earthy, warm, and physical man".

The character of Hagrid and conversations between him, Harry Potter, Ron Weasley and Hermione Granger in his hut are expository through the series, due to the fact that the trio frequently discover things about Albus Dumbledore and Hogwarts by talking with Hagrid, as he has a habit of letting slip bits of information that were specifically confided to him. He was also one of the first characters to imply that the idea of thinking of wizards as "pure-bloods" and "half-bloods" is a dated concept.

Rowling has stated in an interview that Hagrid was in Gryffindor house during his time as a student. When he comes into possession of an acromantula (Aragog), he is expelled from Hogwarts as his pet is believed to be the "monster of Slytherin". However, persuaded by Dumbledore (who at the time was the Transfiguration teacher), Headmaster Armando Dippet agrees to train Hagrid as gamekeeper, allowing the boy to remain at Hogwarts. By the time Harry attends Hogwarts, Hagrid is also the Keeper of Keys and Grounds; the former, according to Rowling, means "that he will let you in and out of Hogwarts." Part of his job includes leading the first years across the lake in boats, upon their initial arrival at Hogwarts.

When discussing the killing off of characters in her books, Rowling said that she always knew she was "working towards the point where Hagrid carried Harry out alive – but supposedly dead – out of the forest". She said she had planned from very early on that Harry would walk to his death accompanied by the 'ghosts', and that "he would emerge in Hagrid's arms". In her own words, "that's what always kept Hagrid safe". She said "Hagrid would have been a natural to kill in some ways", but that the mental image of this moment – a big fatherly Hagrid carrying the limp Harry in his arms – was so strong it decided his fate. Although some fans were afraid that Hagrid would die in the final novel, Rowling had always planned for him to survive. She also liked the circular notion of Hagrid both bringing Harry into the world, and then bringing him back from the dead. During an interview in 2007, when asked if Hagrid did marry, Rowling answered that Hagrid developed a relationship with a giantess, but it did not work out.

== Appearances ==
=== Harry Potter and the Philosopher's Stone ===
Hagrid is introduced in the opening chapter of the first novel, Harry Potter and the Philosopher's Stone (1997). Following the murder of James and Lily Potter by Lord Voldemort, Albus Dumbledore entrusts Hagrid with the infant Harry Potter, who survived Voldemort's attack. Ten years later, Hagrid brings the Philosopher's Stone from Gringotts Wizarding Bank to Hogwarts, where it is guarded by an enormous three-headed dog named Fluffy. Dumbledore also gives Hagrid the task of locating Harry and helping him buy school supplies for his first year at Hogwarts.

Later in the novel, a hooded person—Professor Quirinus Quirrell in disguise—gives Hagrid a dragon egg in exchange for details about Fluffy. Harry and his friends, Ron Weasley and Hermione Granger are also curious about Fluffy, and Hagrid lets slip that the way to get past him is to play music. When Harry and his friends decide to seek the Philosopher's Stone, they soothe Fluffy to sleep with a flute which Hagrid carved for Harry. When the dragon egg hatches, the three friends assist Hagrid by helping to remove the baby dragon Norbert, who is taken to a dragon sanctuary in Romania.

=== Harry Potter and the Chamber of Secrets ===
Hagrid returns in Harry Potter and the Chamber of Secrets (1998). The novel reveals that Hagrid was a student at Hogwarts at the same time as Tom Riddle, the wizard who later became Voldemort. Hagrid was expelled after being caught in the company of Aragog, a gigantic spider. It was believed that Aragog was responsible for mysterious attacks upon students, and that Hagrid had released him from the Chamber of Secrets. The belief of Hagrid's guilt was encouraged by Riddle, the actual perpetrator, who had been using a different monster—a Basilisk—to assault students. In Chamber of Secrets, the Basilisk is unleashed again and Hagrid, seemingly guilty once more, is sent to the wizard prison Azkaban. Before being arrested, Hagrid tells Harry and Ron to follow spiders into the Forbidden Forest so they can meet Aragog and discover the truth about the monster. After Harry defeats the Basilisk in the Chamber of Secrets, Hagrid is cleared out his charges, and freed from prison.

=== Harry Potter and the Prisoner of Azkaban ===
Hagrid becomes the Care of Magical Creatures professor at Hogwarts in Harry Potter and the Prisoner of Azkaban (1999). He was cleared of wrongdoing after the events of the previous novel, and is now allowed to perform magic. During his first class, he introduces Buckbeak and other hippogriffs to the students. After Draco Malfoy provokes Buckbeak, the hippogriff attacks him. As a result, the Ministry of Magic sentences Buckbeak to death. Near the end of the book, Hermione and Harry use a Time-Turner to save Buckbeak from execution.

=== Harry Potter and the Goblet of Fire ===
In Harry Potter and the Goblet of Fire (2000), it is revealed that Hagrid is a half-giant. His mother was the giantess Fridwulfa, and his father was a human wizard. Hagrid's parentage is exposed in the Daily Prophet newspaper by the tabloid journalist Rita Skeeter, who portrays Hagrid as dangerous and incompetent. Hagrid is deeply affected by her article and attempts to resign from his position, but Dumbledore will not accept his resignation. During the course of the novel, Hagrid develops a romantic interest in Olympe Maxime, the towering headmistress of the French wizarding school Beauxbatons.

=== Harry Potter and the Order of the Phoenix ===
Hagrid is absent during the first part of Harry Potter and the Order of the Phoenix (2003). He later reveals to Harry, Ron and Hermione that he and Madame Maxime travelled across Europe together on a mission to find giants and convince them to ally themselves with Dumbledore. However, Death Eaters managed to bring the giants to Voldemort's side. Hagrid was attacked by giants during the mission, and saved by Maxime. During the journey, Maxime became exasperated with Grawp, Hagrid's giant half-brother whom he was attempting to bring with them. Hagrid introduces Grawp to Harry and Hermione, and asks them to supervise him when Hagrid leaves Hogwarts. During the course of the novel, the High Inquisitor of Hogwarts Dolores Umbridge supervises classes and seeks an excuse to fire Hagrid. Eventually, Umbridge and other Ministry of Magic officials attempt to arrest him, but he manages to escape. He is later reinstated as a professor.

=== Harry Potter and the Half-Blood Prince ===
Harry, Ron, and Hermione are no longer Care of Magical Creatures students in Harry Potter and the Half-Blood Prince (2005). Hagrid is both angry and disappointed, but he realises that it is not because they do not like him. When Aragog dies, Hagrid gives the spider a proper funeral. Afterwards, Hagrid and Professor Horace Slughorn drink large quantities of Firewhisky, which allows Harry the opportunity to retrieve an important memory from Slughorn. Towards the end of the novel, Death Eaters attack Hogwarts and set fire to Hagrid's hut as he tries to fight them.

=== Harry Potter and the Deathly Hallows ===
In Harry Potter and the Deathly Hallows (2007), Hagrid is part of the Order of the Phoenix delegation assigned to transport Harry to the Burrow. Hagrid takes Harry on his flying motorcycle, but the journey goes awry when the delegation is ambushed by Death Eaters. Hagrid and Harry manage to arrive at the Burrow after being attacked by Voldemort himself. When the Death Eaters take over Hogwarts, Hagrid is driven into hiding in the mountains. Later, during the Battle of Hogwarts, Hagrid is carried off by a swarm of spiders after attempting to protect them. He is later captured by Death Eaters and brought into the Forbidden Forest, where Harry intends to sacrifice himself to Voldemort. Harry seems to die at Voldemort's hand, and Hagrid carries his body back to Hogwarts. When Harry is revealed to be alive, Hagrid participates in the second part of the battle. He injures Walden Macnair, the executioner who nearly executed Buckbeak.

In the epilogue of Deathly Hallows, set nineteen years after Voldemort's death, Hagrid is still at Hogwarts. He invites Harry's son Albus Severus Potter to his hut for tea. According to Rowling, Hagrid acts as a guardian and guide for Harry throughout the series. She was planning for him to carry Harry to Hogwarts in Deathly Hallows before Philosopher's Stone was even published.

== Portrayal in other media ==
=== Film ===
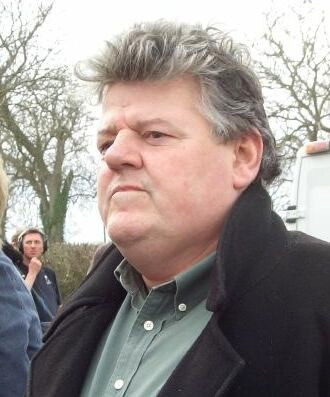
Robbie Coltrane in 2007

The Scottish actor Robbie Coltrane portrays Hagrid in all eight Harry Potter films. Rowling had wanted Coltrane for the role from the start. Robin Williams was interested in the part, but was rejected because the film series had a "British-only" cast policy. Coltrane had read the Harry Potter novels to his son and was already a fan of them. Rowling discussed Hagrid's past and future with Coltrane to help him prepare for the role. She commended him for his ability to portray both the loveable and comic side of Hagrid and the "toughness underneath". Coltrane said that being part of the Harry Potter franchise is "a fantastic thing".

Former English rugby union player Martin Bayfield portrayed Hagrid as a stunt performer in longer shots due to his large size to emphasise Hagrid's height. Bayfield also appeared as a young Hagrid in Harry Potter and the Chamber of Secrets.

=== Television ===
Hagrid is set to be portrayed by actor Nick Frost in the HBO television adaption of the Harry Potter series.

== Characterisation ==
=== Outward appearance ===
In Philosopher's Stone, Hagrid is described as being twice as tall as the average man and nearly five times as wide (later novels call him three times as wide). In the film version of Philosopher's Stone, his height is 8 feet 6 inches (2.59 metres).

=== Personality ===
Hagrid has a friendly, softhearted personality and is easily driven to tears. He is very loyal to his peers, especially Dumbledore, to whom he refers as the greatest wizard in the world multiple times. As first seen in Philosopher's Stone, he becomes extremely angry whenever anyone insults Dumbledore around him (a mistake made by Vernon Dursley, who called Dumbledore a "crackpot old fool"). He is also very loyal to Harry, suffered several times during the series because of this loyalty, and had to go into hiding twice to avoid prison. Rowling says of Hagrid, "Hagrid was always supposed to be this almost elemental force. He's like the king of the forest, or the Green Man. He's this semi-wild person who lives on the edge of the forest".

=== Magical abilities and skills ===
Following his expulsion from Hogwarts, the Ministry of Magic broke Hagrid's oak wand and forbade him to perform magic. Hagrid keeps the pieces of his wand in a pink umbrella, and performs small spells from time to time; however, he was technically forbidden to do magic until the third book, and since he is not a fully qualified wizard, he "will always be a bit inept" as compared to other adult wizards, but "occasionally surprises everyone, himself included, by bringing off more impressive bits of magic". However, he is unable to produce a Patronus. He also has magical abilities that stem from his giant blood. For example, in Harry Potter and the Order of the Phoenix, many of the stunning spells thrown at him by Ministry officials simply bounce off him. Also, being half-giant gives Hagrid some level of superhuman strength, which allowed him to bend the barrel of a shotgun with one hand.

Being a half-giant, he is less vulnerable to jinxes and spells than full humans. In Order of the Phoenix, when Umbridge and some other wizards come to remove him from Hogwarts he fights back. They try to jinx and stun him, but the spells just bounce off him because of giant-inherited resistance to magic. Hagrid also shows this resilience at the end of Half-Blood Prince, during the chapter Flight of the Prince, withstanding a Death Eater's powerful curses. Some potions are also ineffective with him, such as Polyjuice Potion, which is designed for human-only use.

== Analysis ==
In her article "Harry's Fame", Rosemary Goring notes the Forest of Dean is an influence on Rowling's work, and Hagrid is the only character that is "directly drawn from the Forest of Dean". According to Goring, Hagrid's "dropped word-endings are a Chepstow speciality." She also claims that Hagrid is physically "modeled on the Welsh chapter of Hells Angels who'd swoop down on the town and hog the bar, 'huge mountains of leather and hair".

== In popular culture ==
In Alistair McGowan's Big Impression show, Hagrid appeared in a sketch called "Louis Potter and the Philosopher's Scone", in which he was portrayed by Robbie Coltrane himself. Hagrid is also parodied in Harry Potter and the Secret Chamberpot of Azerbaijan, a story released by Comic Relief in 2003, and he was played by Ronnie Corbett. Hagrid also appears in the parody stage production Harry Potter and the Obnoxious Voice, interacting with Draco Malfoy and a dementor.

Hagrid makes an appearance in the theme park attraction Harry Potter and the Forbidden Journey at The Wizarding World of Harry Potter in Orlando, Japan and Hollywood. A new rollercoaster, Hagrid's Magical Creatures Motorbike Adventure, opened at Universal Orlando's Islands of Adventure theme park on 13 June 2019, replacing the Dragon Challenge dual roller coasters and is themed around Hagrid and his love for magical creatures.
