= Wizarding World =

Warner Bros. media franchise

- Logo used since 2018
- Original work: Harry Potter and the Philosopher's Stone (2001)
- Owners: Warner Bros. Entertainment (Skydance)
- Years: 2001–present
- Based on: Harry Potter by J.K. Rowling

Print publications
- Books: List of books

Films and television
- Films: Harry Potter films; Fantastic Beasts films
- Television series: Harry Potter

Theatrical presentations
- Play: Harry Potter and the Cursed Child

Games
- Video games: List of video games

Audio
- Soundtracks: List of soundtracks

Miscellaneous
- Theme park attraction: The Wizarding World of Harry Potter

The Wizarding World (previously known as J. K. Rowling's Wizarding World) is a media franchise and shared fictional universe centred on the Harry Potter novel series by J. K. Rowling. A series of films have been in production since 2000, and in that time eleven films have been produced—eight are adaptations of the Harry Potter novels and three are part of the Fantastic Beasts series. The films are owned and distributed by Warner Bros. Pictures. The series has collectively grossed over $9.6 billion at the global box office, making it the fourth-highest-grossing film franchise of all time (behind the Marvel Cinematic Universe, Spider-Man and Star Wars).

David Heyman and his company Heyday Films have produced every film in the Wizarding World series. Chris Columbus and Mark Radcliffe served as producers on Harry Potter and the Prisoner of Azkaban, David Barron began producing the films with Harry Potter and the Order of the Phoenix in 2007 and ending with Harry Potter and the Deathly Hallows – Part 2 in 2011, and Rowling produced the final two films in the Harry Potter series. Heyman, Rowling, Steve Kloves and Lionel Wigram have produced all three films in the Fantastic Beasts series. The films are written and directed by several individuals and feature large, often ensemble, casts. Many of the actors, including Daniel Radcliffe, Rupert Grint, Emma Watson, Tom Felton, Michael Gambon, Ralph Fiennes, Alan Rickman, Maggie Smith, Helena Bonham Carter, Gary Oldman, Eddie Redmayne, Katherine Waterston, Alison Sudol, and Dan Fogler star in numerous films. Additionally, Jude Law and Johnny Depp feature in two films each. Soundtrack albums have been released for each of the films. The franchise also includes a stage production (Harry Potter and the Cursed Child), a digital publication, a video game label and The Wizarding World of Harry Potter–themed areas at several Universal Destinations & Experiences amusement parks around the world.

The first film in the Wizarding World was Harry Potter and the Philosopher's Stone (2001), which was followed by seven Harry Potter sequels, beginning with Harry Potter and the Chamber of Secrets in 2002 and ending with Harry Potter and the Deathly Hallows – Part 2 in 2011, nearly ten years after the first film's release. Fantastic Beasts and Where to Find Them (2016) is the first film in the spin-off/prequel Fantastic Beasts series. A sequel, titled Fantastic Beasts: The Crimes of Grindelwald, was released on 16 November 2018. A third film, Fantastic Beasts: The Secrets of Dumbledore was released on 15 April 2022. The first Wizarding World-branded narrative video game, Hogwarts Legacy, was released in early 2023. Warner Bros. is also developing a television series for HBO, with a season adapting each of the seven Harry Potter books.

== Harry Potter films ==
Film	Release date	Director	Screenwriter	Producer(s)
Harry Potter and the Philosopher's Stone	16 November 2001	Chris Columbus	Steve Kloves	David Heyman
Harry Potter and the Chamber of Secrets	15 November 2002	Chris Columbus	Steve Kloves	David Heyman
Harry Potter and the Prisoner of Azkaban	31 May 2004	Alfonso Cuarón	Steve Kloves	David Heyman, Chris Columbus & Mark Radcliffe
Harry Potter and the Goblet of Fire	18 November 2005	Mike Newell	Steve Kloves	David Heyman
Harry Potter and the Order of the Phoenix	11 July 2007	David Yates	Michael Goldenberg	David Heyman & David Barron
Harry Potter and the Half-Blood Prince	15 July 2009	David Yates	Steve Kloves	David Heyman & David Barron
Harry Potter and the Deathly Hallows – Part 1	19 November 2010	David Yates	Steve Kloves	David Heyman, David Barron & J. K. Rowling
Harry Potter and the Deathly Hallows – Part 2	15 July 2011	David Yates	Steve Kloves	David Heyman, David Barron & J. K. Rowling

=== Harry Potter and the Philosopher's Stone (2001) ===
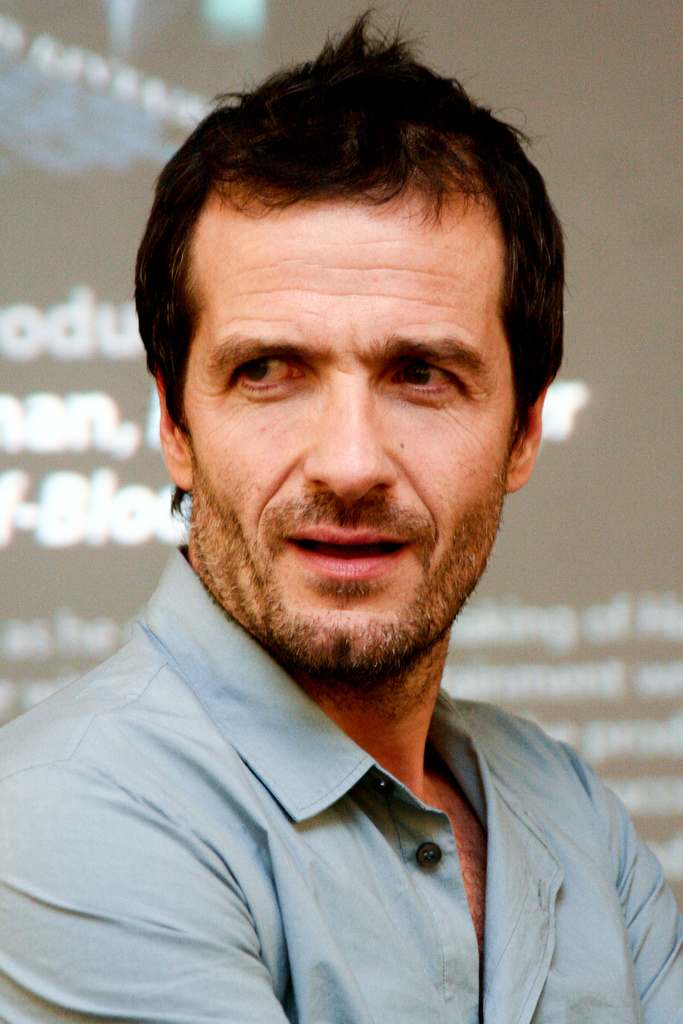
David Heyman has produced every film in the Wizarding World.

Harry Potter, a seemingly ordinary eleven-year-old boy, is actually a wizard and survivor of Lord Voldemort's attempted rise to power. Harry is rescued by Rubeus Hagrid from his unkind Muggle relatives, Uncle Vernon, Aunt Petunia, and his cousin Dudley, and takes his place at Hogwarts School of Witchcraft and Wizardry, where he and his friends Ron Weasley and Hermione Granger become entangled in the mystery of the Philosopher's Stone, which is being kept within the school.

In October 1998, Warner Bros. purchased the film rights to the first four novels of the Harry Potter fantasy series by J. K. Rowling for a seven-figure sum, after a pitch from producer David Heyman. Warner Bros. took particular notice of Rowling's wishes and thoughts about the films when drafting her contract. One of her principal stipulations was that they are shot in Britain with an all-British cast, which has been generally adhered to. On 8 August 2000, the then-unknown Daniel Radcliffe and newcomers Rupert Grint and Emma Watson were selected to play Harry Potter, Ron Weasley and Hermione Granger, respectively. Chris Columbus was hired to direct the film adaptation of Philosopher's Stone, with Steve Kloves selected to write the screenplay. Filming began on 29 September 2000 at Leavesden Film Studios and concluded on 23 March 2001, with final work being done in July. Principal photography took place on 2 October 2000 at North Yorkshire's Goathland railway station. Warner Bros. had initially planned to release the film over 4 July 2001 weekend, making for such a short production window that several proposed directors removed themselves from consideration. Because of time constraints, the date was put back, and Harry Potter and the Philosopher's Stone was released in the United Kingdom and the United States on 16 November 2001.

=== Harry Potter and the Chamber of Secrets (2002) ===
Harry, Ron, and Hermione return to Hogwarts for their second year, but a mysterious chamber, hidden in the school, is opened leaving students and ghosts petrified by an unknown agent. They must solve the mystery of the chamber, and discover its entrance to find and defeat the true culprit.

Columbus and Kloves returned as director, and screenwriter for the film adaptation of Chamber of Secrets. Just three days after the wide release of the first film, production began on 19 November 2001 in Surrey, England, with filming continuing on location on the Isle of Man and at several other locations in Great Britain. Leavesden Film Studios in London made several scenes for Hogwarts. Principal photography concluded in the summer of 2002. The film spent until early October in post-production. Harry Potter and the Chamber of Secrets premiered in the United Kingdom on 3 November 2002 before its wide release on 15 November, one year after the Philosopher's Stone.

=== Harry Potter and the Prisoner of Azkaban (2004) ===
A mysterious convict, Sirius Black, escapes from Azkaban and sets his sights on Hogwarts, where dementors are stationed to protect Harry and his peers. Harry learns more about his past and his connection with the escaped prisoner.

Columbus, the director of the two previous films, decided not to return to helm the third instalment, but remained as a producer alongside Heyman. Warner Bros. then drew up a three-name short list for Columbus' replacement, which comprised Callie Khouri, Kenneth Branagh (who played Gilderoy Lockhart in Chamber of Secrets) and the eventual director Alfonso Cuarón. Cuarón was initially nervous about accepting the job having not read any of the books, or seen the films, but later signed on after reading the series and connecting immediately with the story. Michael Gambon replaced Richard Harris, who played Albus Dumbledore in the previous two films, after Harris's death in October 2002. Gambon was unconcerned with bettering or copying Harris, instead provided his own interpretation, including using a slight Irish accent for the role. He completed his scenes in three weeks. Gary Oldman was cast in the key role of Sirius Black in February 2003. Principal photography began on 24 February 2003, at Leavesden Film Studios, and concluded in October 2003. Harry Potter and the Prisoner of Azkaban premiered on 23 May 2004 in New York. It was released in the United Kingdom on 31 May, and in the United States on 4 June. It was the first film in the series to be released in both conventional and IMAX theatres.

=== Harry Potter and the Goblet of Fire (2005) ===
After the Quidditch World Cup, Harry arrives back at Hogwarts and finds himself entered in the Triwizard Tournament, a challenging competition involving completing three dangerous tasks. Harry is forced to compete with three other wizards chosen by the Goblet of Fire – Fleur Delacour, Viktor Krum, and Cedric Diggory.

In August 2003, British film director Mike Newell was chosen to direct the film after Prisoner of Azkaban director Alfonso Cuarón announced that he would not direct the sequel. Heyman returned to produce, and Kloves again wrote the screenplay. Principal photography began on 4 May 2004. Scenes involving the film's principal actors began shooting on 25 June 2004 at England's Leavesden Film Studios. Harry Potter and the Goblet of Fire premiered on 6 November 2005 in London, and was released in the United Kingdom and the United States on 18 November. Goblet of Fire was the first film in the series to receive a PG-13 rating by the Motion Picture Association of America (MPAA) for "sequences of fantasy violence and frightening images," M by the Australian Classification Board (ACB), and a 12A by the British Board of Film Classification (BBFC) for its dark themes, fantasy violence, threat and frightening images.

=== Harry Potter and the Order of the Phoenix (2007) ===
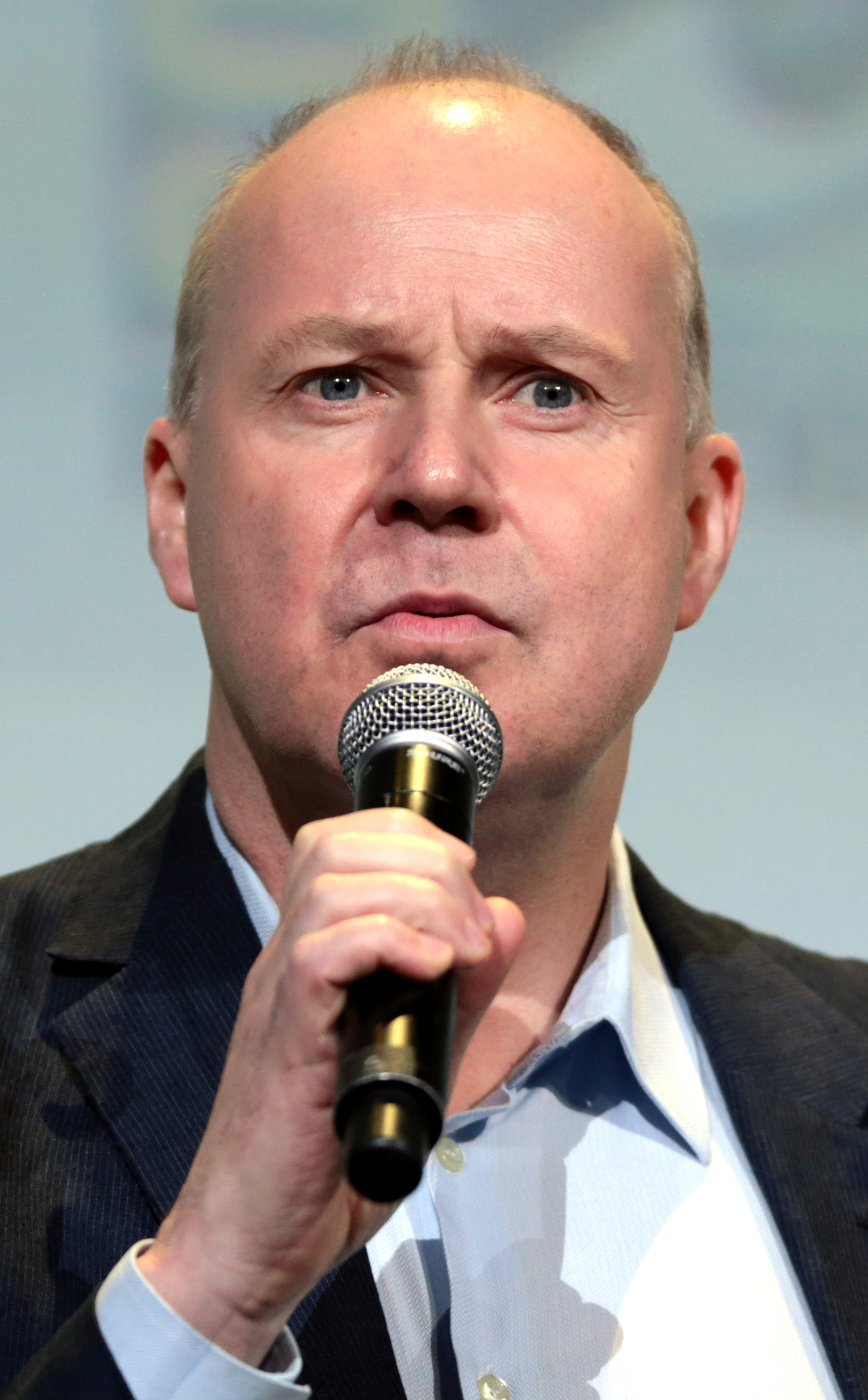
David Yates has directed every film in the franchise since Order of the Phoenix.

Harry returns for his fifth year at Hogwarts and discovers that the Wizarding World is in denial of Voldemort's return. He takes matters into his own hands and starts a secret organisation to stand up against the regime of Hogwarts' "High Inquisitor" Dolores Umbridge, as well as to learn practical Defence Against the Dark Arts (D.A.D.A) for the forthcoming battle.

Daniel Radcliffe confirmed he would return as Harry Potter in May 2005, with Rupert Grint, Emma Watson, Matthew Lewis (Neville Longbottom), and Bonnie Wright (Ginny Weasley) confirmed to return in November 2005. In February 2006, Helen McCrory was cast as Bellatrix Lestrange, but dropped out due to her pregnancy. In May 2006, Helena Bonham Carter was cast in her place. Ralph Fiennes reprises his role as Lord Voldemort. British television director David Yates was chosen to direct the film after Goblet of Fire director Newell, as well as Jean-Pierre Jeunet, Guillermo del Toro, Matthew Vaughn and Mira Nair, turned down offers. Kloves, the screenwriter of the first four Harry Potter films, had other commitments and Michael Goldenberg, who had been considered for screenwriter of the series' first film, filled in to write the script. Principal photography began on 7 February 2006, and concluded at the start of December 2006. Filming was put on a two-month hiatus starting in May 2006 so Radcliffe could sit his AS Levels and Watson could sit her GCSE exams. Live-action filming took place in England and Scotland for exterior locations and at Leavesden Film Studios for interior locations. Harry Potter and the Order of the Phoenix had its world premiere on 28 June 2007 in Tokyo, Japan, and a UK premiere on 3 July 2007 at the Odeon Leicester Square in London. The film was released in the United Kingdom on 12 July, and the United States on 11 July.

=== Harry Potter and the Half-Blood Prince (2009) ===
Voldemort and his Death Eaters are increasing their terror upon the Wizarding and Muggle worlds. Needing him for an important reason, Headmaster Dumbledore persuades his old friend Horace Slughorn to return to his prior post at Hogwarts. During Slughorn's Potions class, Harry takes possession of a strangely annotated school textbook, previously owned by the "Half-Blood Prince".

In July 2007, it was announced that Yates would return as director. Kloves returned to write the screenplay after skipping out of the fifth film, with Heyman and David Barron back as producers. Watson considered not returning for the film, but eventually signed on after Warner Bros. moved the production schedule to accommodate her exam dates. Principal photography began on 24 September 2007, and concluded on 17 May 2008. Though Radcliffe, Gambon and Jim Broadbent (Slughorn) started shooting in late September 2007, other cast members started much later: Watson did not begin until December 2007, Alan Rickman (Severus Snape) until January 2008, and Bonham Carter until February 2008. Harry Potter and the Half-Blood Prince had its world premiere on 6 July 2009 in Tokyo, Japan, and was released in the United Kingdom and the United States on 15 July.

=== Harry Potter and the Deathly Hallows – Part 1 (2010) ===
Harry, Ron, and Hermione leave Hogwarts behind and set out to find and destroy Lord Voldemort's secret to immortality – the Horcruxes. The trio undergo a long journey with many obstacles in their path including Death Eaters, Snatchers, the mysterious Deathly Hallows, and Harry's connection with the Dark Lord's mind becoming ever stronger.

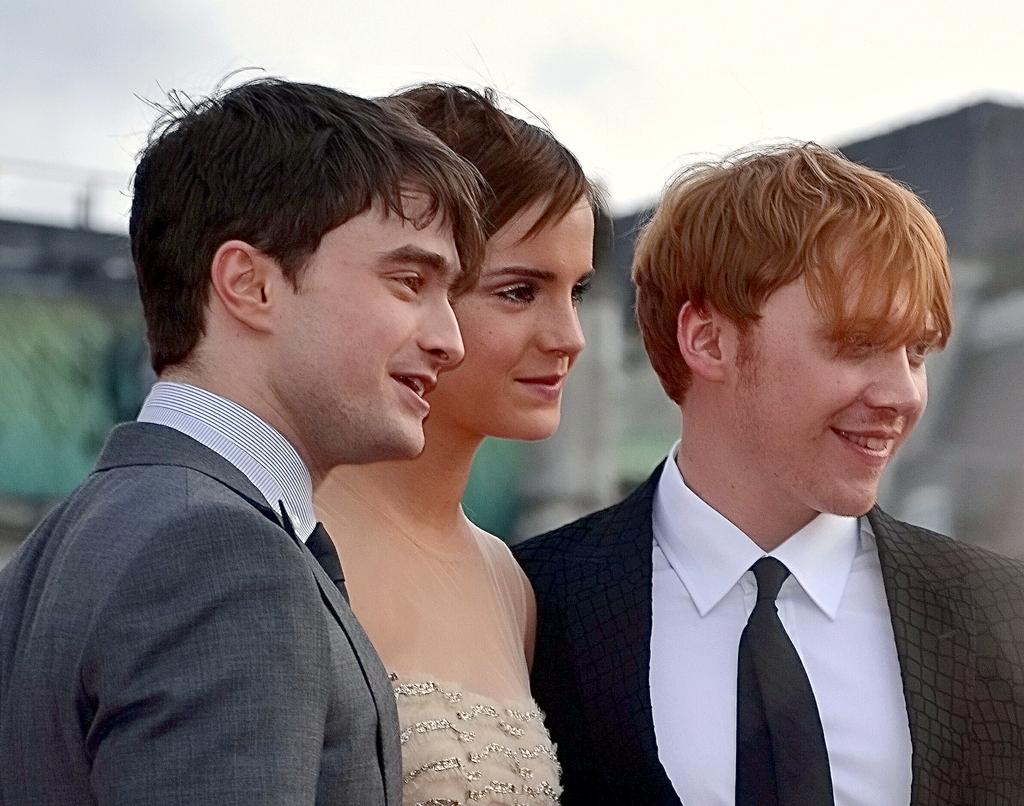
Daniel Radcliffe, Emma Watson and Rupert Grint at the world premiere of Deathly Hallows – Part 2 on 7 July 2011 at Trafalgar Square in London

Originally scheduled for a single theatrical release, on 13 March 2008, Warner Bros. announced that the film adaptation of Deathly Hallows would be split into two parts to do justice to the book and out of respect for its fans. Yates, director of the previous two films, was confirmed to return as director, and Kloves was confirmed as screenwriter. For the first time in the series, Rowling was credited as a producer alongside Heyman and Barron, however Yates noted that her participation in the filmmaking process did not change from the previous films. Pre-production began on 26 January 2009, while principal photography began on 19 February at Leavesden Studios, where the previous six instalments were filmed. Pinewood Studios became the second studio location for shooting the seventh film.

=== Harry Potter and the Deathly Hallows – Part 2 (2011) ===
Harry, Ron, and Hermione continue their search to find and destroy the remaining Horcruxes, as Harry prepares for the final battle against Voldemort.

The film was announced in March 2008 as Harry Potter and the Deathly Hallows – Part 2, the second of two cinematic parts. It was also revealed that Yates would direct the film and that Kloves would write the screenplay. Kloves started work on the second part's script in April 2009, after the first part's script was completed. Deathly Hallows – Part 2 was filmed back-to-back with Part 1 from 19 February 2009 to 12 June 2010. Reshoots for the epilogue scene, which had originally been filmed at London King's Cross station, took place at Leavesden Studios on 21 December 2010, marking the end of production of the Harry Potter film series.

The film had its world premiere on 7 July 2011 in Trafalgar Square in London, and a U.S. premiere on 11 July at Lincoln Center in New York City. Although filmed in 2D, the film was converted into 3D in post-production and was released in both RealD 3D and IMAX 3D, becoming the first and only film in the series to be released in this format. The film was released on 15 July in the United Kingdom and the United States.

=== Future ===
In July 2016, Warner Bros. Entertainment applied to purchase the rights to the stage play Harry Potter and the Cursed Child, leading to speculation that it was going to be adapted into film, despite earlier claims, most notably from Rowling, that a film adaptation was not being made.

In November 2021, Chris Columbus, who directed the first two Harry Potter films, expressed interest in directing a film adaptation of The Cursed Child, with the intent of having the main cast members reprise their roles. When The New York Times asked Daniel Radcliffe in 2022 if he would be ready to reprise his role as Harry Potter, he replied that he was not interested in it at the moment, but did not deny the possibility of returning sometime in the future.

In a Sunday Times interview in August 2025, Columbus confirmed that he maintains close relationships with the original cast but has not spoken to Rowling in "a decade or so". He went on to state that the controversy over Rowling's views on transgender people meant that a film adaptation of The Cursed Child with the original cast was "never going to happen". In a recent interview with Variety that same month, Columbus spoke of "separating the artist from the art" and described the controversy around Rowling as "just sad, it's very sad", while noting that he does not agree with her views.

== Fantastic Beasts films ==
Film	Release date	Director	Screenwriter(s)	Producer(s)
Fantastic Beasts and Where to Find Them	18 November 2016	David Yates	J. K. Rowling	David Heyman, J. K. Rowling, Steve Kloves & Lionel Wigram
Fantastic Beasts: The Crimes of Grindelwald	16 November 2018	David Yates	J. K. Rowling	David Heyman, J. K. Rowling, Steve Kloves & Lionel Wigram
Fantastic Beasts: The Secrets of Dumbledore	15 April 2022	David Yates	J. K. Rowling & Steve Kloves	David Heyman, J. K. Rowling, Steve Kloves, Lionel Wigram & Tim Lewis

=== Fantastic Beasts and Where to Find Them (2016) ===
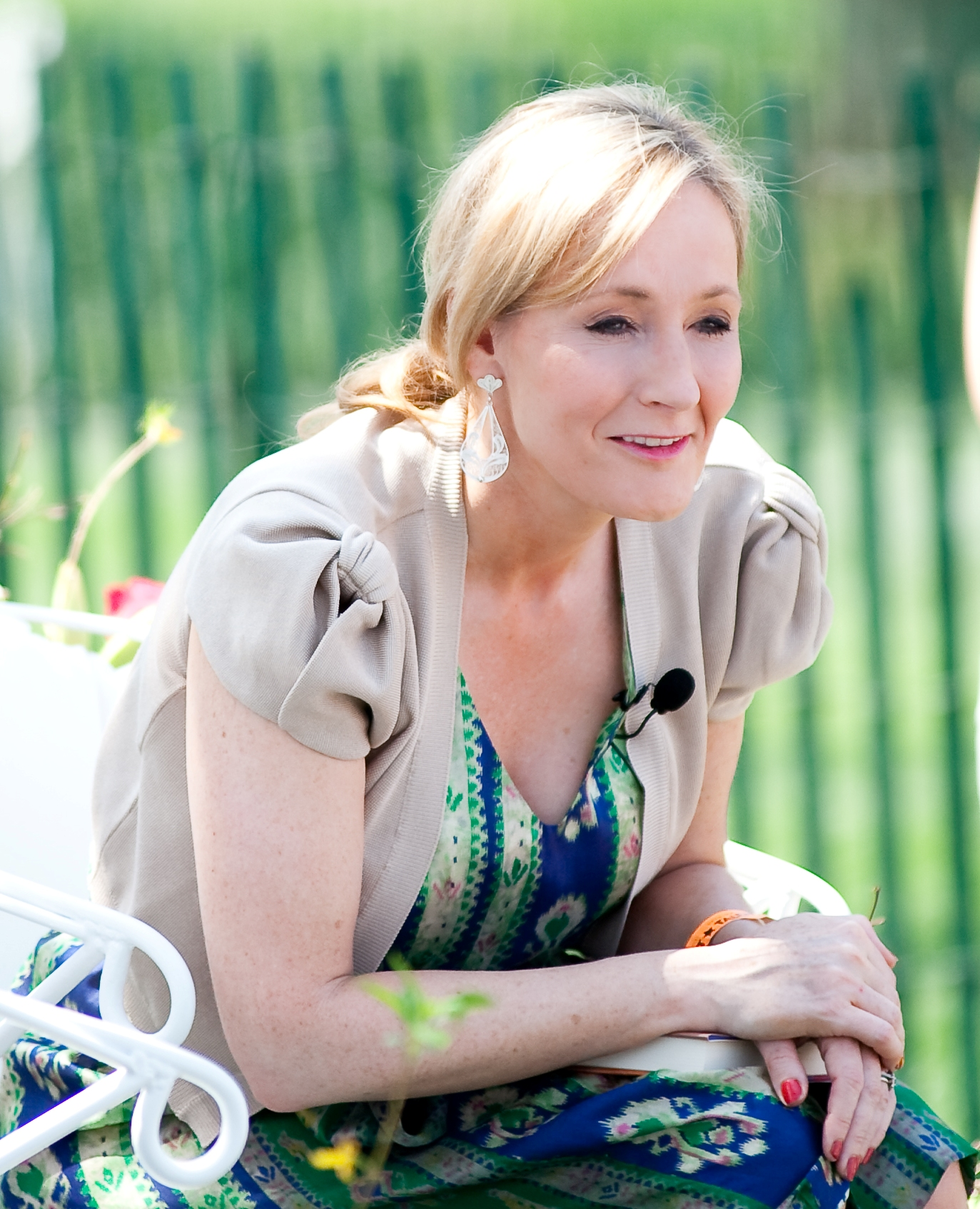
Harry Potter author J. K. Rowling wrote and produced the three films in the Fantastic Beasts series and produced the last two Harry Potter films.

In 1926, Newt Scamander arrives in New York City with his magically expanded briefcase which houses a number of dangerous creatures and their habitats. When some creatures escape from his briefcase, Newt must battle to correct the mistake, and the horrors of the resultant increase in violence, fear, and tension felt between magical and non-magical people (No-Maj).

On 12 September 2013, Warner Bros. announced that J. K. Rowling was writing a script based on her book Fantastic Beasts and Where to Find Them and the adventures of its fictional author Newt Scamander, set seventy years before the adventures of Harry Potter. The film would mark her screenwriting debut and is planned as the first movie in a new series. According to Rowling, after Warner Bros. suggested an adaptation, she wrote a rough draft of the script in twelve days. She said, "It wasn't a great draft but it did show the shape of how it might look. So that is how it all started." In March 2014, it was revealed that a trilogy was scheduled with the first instalment set in New York. The film sees the return of producer David Heyman, as well as writer Steve Kloves, both veterans of the Potter film series. In June 2015, Eddie Redmayne was cast in the lead role of Newt Scamander, the Wizarding World's preeminent magizoologist. Other cast members include: Katherine Waterston as Tina Goldstein, Alison Sudol as Queenie Goldstein, Dan Fogler as Jacob Kowalski, Ezra Miller as Credence Barebone, Samantha Morton as Mary Lou Barebone, Jenn Murray as Chastity Barebone, Faith Wood-Blagrove as Modesty Barebone, and Colin Farrell as Percival Graves. Principal photography began on 17 August 2015, at Warner Bros. Studios, Leavesden. After two months, the production moved to St George's Hall in Liverpool, which was transformed into 1920s New York City. Fantastic Beasts and Where to Find Them was released worldwide on 18 November 2016.

=== Fantastic Beasts: The Crimes of Grindelwald (2018) ===
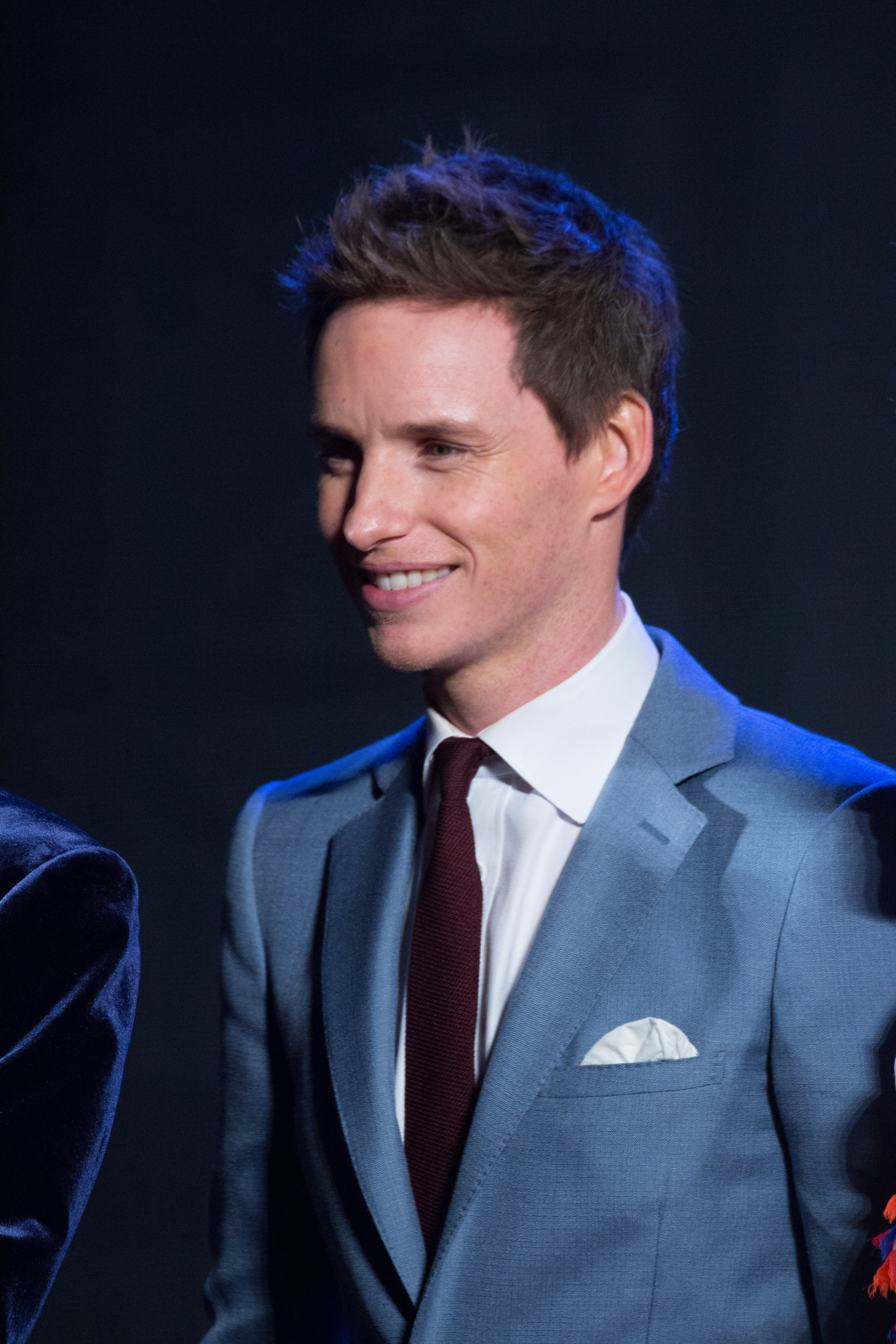
Eddie Redmayne at the Red Carpet Japan Premiere of Fantastic Beasts and Where to Find Them

A few months after the events of Fantastic Beasts and Where to Find Them, Gellert Grindelwald has escaped imprisonment and begins gathering followers for his cause – elevating wizards above all non-magical beings. Dumbledore must seek help from his former student Newt to put a stop to Grindelwald.

The film was announced in March 2014 as the second instalment in the series. In October 2016, it was revealed that Yates and Rowling would return as director, and screenwriter and co-producer, and Redmayne would be returning to play the lead role of Newt Scamander in all the series' films. In November 2016, it was confirmed that Johnny Depp would reprise his role as Gellert Grindelwald from the first instalment. Later that same month it was also announced that Albus Dumbledore would be appearing in future instalments, albeit with a younger actor for the prequel film series. In April 2017, it was confirmed that Jude Law had been cast as Dumbledore. The film takes place in New York City, Britain, and Paris. Principal photography began on 3 July 2017, at Warner Bros. Studios, Leavesden, and wrapped on 20 December 2017. Fantastic Beasts: The Crimes of Grindelwald was released on 16 November 2018.

=== Fantastic Beasts: The Secrets of Dumbledore (2022) ===
Several years after the events of The Crimes of Grindelwald, the story begins in the UK, the US and China and proceeds to take place partly in Berlin, Germany and partly in Bhutan, Asia and leads up to the Wizarding World's involvement in World War II. Newt continues his quest with Dumbledore to stop Grindelwald.

Originally scheduled to begin filming in July 2019, and released in November 2020, production was pushed back to late 2019 to allow more time polishing the script and plan the future of the series. In 2018 on Twitter, J. K. Rowling promised that the third film would give answers to the questions left unsolved in the first two. In October 2019, Dan Fogler claimed that principal photography on the third film would begin in February 2020. In November 2019, it was announced that the script had been written by both J. K. Rowling and Steve Kloves, the latter of whom returned after being absent as a writer on the first two. On 16 March 2020, the very day that principal photography would begin, the COVID-19 pandemic prompted Warner Bros. to postpone production of its third Fantastic Beasts film. This made the film to be postponed again, from a 12 November 2021 to a 15 July 2022 release. On 20 August 2020, filming was confirmed to start in September. On 20 September 2020, Eddie Redmayne confirmed that filming was two weeks underway with safety precautions in place to keep the cast and crew safe from COVID-19. Johnny Depp announced on 6 November 2020 that he left the film at the request of Warner Bros. Studios. This was the result of Depp losing a libel lawsuit in the UK. On 25 November 2020, Warner Bros. announced that Mads Mikkelsen would replace Depp in the role of Grindelwald. On 3 February 2021, filming in the UK was shut down after a production member tested positive for COVID-19. Composer James Newton Howard confirmed later that month that production had wrapped filming. In September 2021, the film's release was pushed forward three months to 15 April 2022, alongside the announcement of the full title. It premiered one week early in a few European and Asian countries.

=== Future ===
In October 2016, Rowling announced that the Fantastic Beasts film series would be composed of five films, later confirming that the story of the series would consist of a sequence of events that occurred between the years of 1926 and 1945. In February 2022, producer David Heyman revealed that work on the script for Fantastic Beasts 4 had not begun yet. In April 2022, Variety reported that Warner Bros. greenlighting the final two installments would be dependent on the critical and commercial performance of The Secrets of Dumbledore. In November 2022, it was reported that Warner Bros. Discovery was not actively planning to continue the film series or to develop any films related to the Wizarding World franchise.

== Television ==
=== Harry Potter television series ===
In January 2021, it was reported that Warner Bros. were reviewing pitches for a television series, set in the wizarding world, to debut on HBO Max. In May 2022, the reports circulated about the announced meeting between Warner Bros. Discovery CEO David Zaslav and J. K. Rowling in their discussion for future HBO Max projects set within the wizarding world.

On 12 April 2023, Warner Bros. Discovery announced a new live-action Harry Potter television series at a press event for its newly rebranded streaming service Max. It will be a reboot of the franchise, retelling the story of the novels with a season dedicated to each of the seven books, and will be produced over the course of ten years. J. K. Rowling will be joining the production as an executive producer, with the author stating that she is "looking forward to being part of this new adaptation which will allow for a degree of depth and detail only afforded by a long form television series". The show is expected to release in 2026. On 25 June 2024, it was announced that the series has been moved from Max to HBO.

On 26 June 2024, Francesca Gardiner was announced as the series' showrunner, Mark Mylod was announced as director and an executive producer, and David Heyman, who produced the original film series, was announced as an executive producer. On 14 April 2025, the first adult cast members were officially announced, including John Lithgow as Albus Dumbledore, Paapa Essiedu as Severus Snape, Nick Frost as Rubeus Hagrid and Janet McTeer as Minerva McGonagall . Lithgow acknowledged there would be controversy over him playing the role as an American, when the original film series only cast British or Irish cast members at Rowling's request, and that he would work with a dialect coach in addition to first reading the books after he was cast. He said: "I don't know the Harry Potter canon by heart as 98% of the world's population seems to," but said that in talks with the producers he was intrigued by how "as the kids grew older [in the books], you learn more and more about Dumbledore, and he became a much more surprising, complicated character." On 27 May, the cast for the main trio was announced: Dominic McLaughlin as Harry Potter, Arabella Stanton as Hermione Granger, and Alastair Stout as Ron Weasley. Production began in July 2025, when a first official image of McLaughlin in costume was released. In his first public comments to the BBC, McLaughlin called it a "dream role" as fan of the books. Stanton was also announced as the voice of the younger Hermione in a new audio book series, and said in an official clip from Audible that she had similarities with her character. In August 2025, Warner Brothers announced the casting of Tristan and Gabriel Harland as Fred and George Weasley, Ruari Spooner as Percy Weasley, and Gracie Cochrane as Ginny Weasley. Cochrane had earlier said that the original Goblet of Fire film was a favourite of hers, in addition to being a fan of the books. It was announced as part of "Back to Hogwarts" day on 1 September 2025 that Warwick Davis would reprise his role as Professor Flitwick, in addition to other casting announcements. Both Daniel Radcliffe and Rupert Grint said they had written letters to the young actors playing their characters.

=== Official television shows and special ===
Title	Season	Episodes	Originally aired		Network(s)	Host(s)
Title	Season	Episodes	First aired	Last aired	Network(s)	Host(s)
Harry Potter: Hogwarts Tournament of Houses	1	4	28 November 2021	19 December 2021	TBS; Cartoon Network HBO Max	Helen Mirren
Harry Potter: Wizards of Baking	1	6	14 November 2024	19 December 2024	Max; Food Network HBO Max	James and Oliver Phelps
Harry Potter: Wizards of Baking	2	6	TBA	TBA	HBO Max	James and Oliver Phelps

TBS and Cartoon Network aired Harry Potter: Hogwarts Tournament of Houses on 28 November 2021 as part of the 20th anniversary celebrations. It was a bracket style quiz show where fans would compete for their Hogwarts house in teams of three. It featured four episodes and was hosted by Helen Mirren and included Harry Potter cast members: Tom Felton, Simon Fisher-Becker, Shirley Henderson, Luke Youngblood, Matthew Lewis, along with other cameos like Pete Davidson and comedian Jay Leno.

Many members of the original cast reunited for Harry Potter 20th Anniversary: Return to Hogwarts, an HBO Max retrospective special to celebrate the 20th anniversary of the first film, which was released on 1 January 2022.

A cooking show, Harry Potter: Wizards of Baking, premiered on 14 November 2024. It is hosted by Harry Potter cast members James and Oliver Phelps.

== Music ==
Title	Release date	Length	Composer	Label
Harry Potter and the Philosopher's Stone (Original Motion Picture Soundtrack)	30 October 2001	73:35	John Williams	Atlantic; Nonesuch; Warner Sunset
Harry Potter and the Chamber of Secrets (Original Motion Picture Soundtrack)	12 November 2002	70:08	John Williams	Atlantic; Nonesuch; Warner Sunset
Harry Potter and the Prisoner of Azkaban (Original Motion Picture Soundtrack)	25 May 2004	68:37	John Williams	Atlantic; Nonesuch; Warner Sunset
Harry Potter and the Goblet of Fire (Original Motion Picture Soundtrack)	15 November 2005	75:58	Patrick Doyle	Warner Sunset
Harry Potter and the Order of the Phoenix (Original Motion Picture Soundtrack)	10 July 2007	52:22	Nicholas Hooper	Warner Sunset
Harry Potter and the Half-Blood Prince (Original Motion Picture Soundtrack)	14 July 2009	62:40	Nicholas Hooper	New Line Records
Harry Potter and the Deathly Hallows – Part 1 (Original Motion Picture Soundtrack)	16 November 2010	73:38	Alexandre Desplat	WaterTower Music
Harry Potter and the Deathly Hallows – Part 2 (Original Motion Picture Soundtrack)	12 July 2011	68:26	Alexandre Desplat	WaterTower Music
Fantastic Beasts and Where to Find Them (Original Motion Picture Soundtrack)	18 November 2016	72:00	James Newton Howard	WaterTower Music
Fantastic Beasts: The Crimes of Grindelwald (Original Motion Picture Soundtrack)	9 November 2018	77:17	James Newton Howard	WaterTower Music
Fantastic Beasts: The Secrets of Dumbledore (Original Motion Picture Soundtrack)	8 April 2022	110:14	James Newton Howard	WaterTower Music

== Reception ==
=== Box office performance ===
As of 2022, the first 11 Wizarding World films have collectively grossed over $9.6 billion at the global box office, making it the fourth-highest-grossing film franchise of all time behind the Marvel Cinematic Universe films, the Star Wars films and the Spider-Man films. The first ten films emerged as commercial successes at the box office with the majority of the films grossing over $790 million, and all but The Prisoner of Azkaban and Fantastic Beasts at some point ranked among the ten highest-grossing films of all time. The Harry Potter films are the highest-grossing series based on a single property, earning over $7.7 billion at the box office; Harry Potter has also generated at least $3.9 billion in home video revenue, taking total consumer spending on the films to over $11 billion. Harry Potter also has a series average of over $1 billion per film when adjusted for inflation.

The Deathly Hallows – Part 2 grossed over $1.3 billion becoming the third-highest-grossing film of all time, the highest-grossing film in the Wizarding World franchise, and the highest-grossing film of 2011. In the United States and Canada, it set a single-day and opening-weekend record, with $91.1 million and $169.2 million. In addition, the film set a worldwide opening-weekend record with $483.2 million. The Philosopher's Stone and The Goblet of Fire were also the highest-grossing films of 2001 and 2005; while The Chamber of Secrets, The Prisoner of Azkaban, The Order of the Phoenix, and The Half-Blood Prince were the second highest-grossing films of 2002, 2004, 2007, and 2009. The Deathly Hallows – Part 1 was the third-highest-grossing film of 2010, (behind Toy Story 3 and Alice in Wonderland), Fantastic Beasts and Where to Find Them was the eighth highest-grossing film of 2016, and The Crimes of Grindelwald was the tenth highest-grossing film of 2018. The Secrets of Dumbledore was the first film in the franchise to place outside the top ten grossing films of its release year.

Box office performance of Wizarding World films
Film	Release date	Box office gross			All-time ranking		Budget	Ref.
Film	Release date	U.S. & Canada	Other territories	Worldwide	U.S. and Canada	Worldwide	Budget	Ref.
Harry Potter films
Harry Potter and the Philosopher's Stone	16 November 2001	$318,886,962	$705,377,515	$1,024,264,477	90	51	$125 million	
Harry Potter and the Chamber of Secrets	15 November 2002	$262,641,637	$619,789,539	$882,883,683	130	70	$100 million	
Harry Potter and the Prisoner of Azkaban	4 June 2004	$250,105,651	$558,287,529	$808,481,128	146	101	$130 million	
Harry Potter and the Goblet of Fire	18 November 2005	$290,469,928	$606,345,177	$896,815,106	116	73	$150 million	
Harry Potter and the Order of the Phoenix	11 July 2007	$292,382,727	$649,895,317	$942,278,045	111	67	$150 million	
Harry Potter and the Half-Blood Prince	15 July 2009	$302,334,374	$632,185,012	$934,519,387	102	68	$250 million	
Harry Potter and the Deathly Hallows – Part 1	19 November 2010	$296,374,621	$680,695,761	$977,070,383	106	55	$250 million	
Harry Potter and the Deathly Hallows – Part 2	15 July 2011	$381,447,587	$960,912,354	$1,342,359,942	49	18	$250 million	
Fantastic Beasts films
Fantastic Beasts and Where to Find Them	18 November 2016	$234,037,575	$580,006,426	$814,044,001	165	98	$175 million	
Fantastic Beasts: The Crimes of Grindelwald	16 November 2018	$159,555,901	$495,300,000	$654,855,901	369	160	$200 million	
Fantastic Beasts: The Secrets of Dumbledore	15 April 2022	$95,850,844	$311,300,000	$407,150,844	842	338	$200 million	
Total		$2,885,518,716	$6,800,094,630	$9,685,613,346	5	4	$1,730,000,000	

=== Critical and public response ===
All of the films have been commercially successful, and the majority have been critically successful. The Harry Potter series is noted by audiences and critics for growing narratively complicated, visually darker and more mature as each film was released.

Critical and public response of Wizarding World films
Film	Critical		Public
Film	Rotten Tomatoes	Metacritic	CinemaScore
Harry Potter films
Harry Potter and the Philosopher's Stone	81% (200 reviews)	65 (37 reviews)	A
Harry Potter and the Chamber of Secrets	82% (237 reviews)	63 (35 reviews)	A+
Harry Potter and the Prisoner of Azkaban	90% (258 reviews)	82 (40 reviews)	A
Harry Potter and the Goblet of Fire	88% (255 reviews)	81 (38 reviews)	A
Harry Potter and the Order of the Phoenix	78% (256 reviews)	71 (37 reviews)	A–
Harry Potter and the Half-Blood Prince	84% (280 reviews)	78 (36 reviews)	A–
Harry Potter and the Deathly Hallows – Part 1	77% (288 reviews)	65 (42 reviews)	A
Harry Potter and the Deathly Hallows – Part 2	96% (332 reviews)	85 (41 reviews)	A
Fantastic Beasts films
Fantastic Beasts and Where to Find Them	74% (347 reviews)	66 (50 reviews)	A
Fantastic Beasts: The Crimes of Grindelwald	36% (337 reviews)	52 (48 reviews)	B+
Fantastic Beasts: The Secrets of Dumbledore	46% (248 reviews)	47 (49 reviews)	B+

=== Accolades ===
==== Academy Awards ====
Seven of the 11 films were nominated for a total of 14 Academy Awards. Fantastic Beasts and Where to Find Them won for Best Costume Design in 2017, becoming the first film in the Wizarding World to win an Academy Award. Before the win in 2017, the franchise was the most-snubbed, top-grossing franchise of all time at the Academy Awards, with 12 nominations and zero wins.

Film	Best Art Direction	Best Cinematography	Best Costume Design	Best Makeup	Best Original Score	Best Visual Effects
Philosopher's Stone	Nominated		Nominated		Nominated	
Prisoner of Azkaban					Nominated	Nominated
Goblet of Fire	Nominated					
Half-Blood Prince		Nominated				
Deathly Hallows – Part 1	Nominated					Nominated
Deathly Hallows – Part 2	Nominated			Nominated		Nominated
Where to Find Them	Nominated		Won			

==== British Academy Film Awards ====
The franchise has earned a total of 34 nominations at the British Academy Film Awards presented at the annual BAFTAs, winning three. At the 64th British Academy Film Awards in February 2011, Rowling, producers Heyman and Barron, along with directors Yates, Newell and Cuarón collected the Michael Balcon Award for Outstanding British Contribution to Cinema in honour of the Harry Potter film series. The Harry Potter series was also recognised by the BAFTA Los Angeles Britannia Awards, with Yates winning the Britannia Award for Artistic Excellence in Directing for his four Harry Potter films.

Film	Best British Film	Best Supporting Actor	Best Costume Design	Best Production Design	Best Makeup & Hair	Best Sound	Best Visual Effects
Philosopher's Stone	Nominated	Nominated (Robbie Coltrane)	Nominated	Nominated	Nominated	Nominated	Nominated
Chamber of Secrets				Nominated		Nominated	Nominated
Prisoner of Azkaban	Nominated			Nominated	Nominated		Nominated
Goblet of Fire				Won	Nominated		Nominated
Order of the Phoenix				Nominated			Nominated
Half-Blood Prince				Nominated			Nominated
Deathly Hallows – Part 1					Nominated		Nominated
Deathly Hallows – Part 2				Nominated	Nominated	Nominated	Won
Where to Find Them	Nominated		Nominated	Won		Nominated	Nominated
The Crimes of Grindelwald				Nominated			Nominated

==== Emmy Awards ====
Harry Potter 20th Anniversary: Return to Hogwarts received a nomination for Outstanding Variety Special (Pre-Recorded) at the 74th Primetime Emmy Awards as well as a nomination for Outstanding Picture Editing for Variety Programming at the 74th Primetime Creative Arts Emmy Awards. At the 1st Children's and Family Emmy Awards, Harry Potter: Hogwarts Tournament of Houses won the award for Outstanding Lighting Design for a Live Action Program and Helen Mirren won the award for Outstanding Host for hosting the series.

==== Grammy Awards ====
The franchise has received a total of eight Grammy Award nominations; seven for films in the Harry Potter series with various composers nominated (John Williams, Nicholas Hooper, Alexandre Desplat) and one for the musical Harry Potter and the Cursed Child, composed by Imogen Heap.

Film/Play	Best Score Soundtrack for Visual Media	Best Instrumental Composition	Best Arrangement Instrumental	Best Musical Theater Album
Philosopher's Stone	Nominated	Nominated	Nominated	
Chamber of Secrets	Nominated			
Prisoner of Azkaban	Nominated			
Half-Blood Prince	Nominated			
Deathly Hallows – Part 2	Nominated			
Cursed Child				Nominated

==== Laurence Olivier Awards ====
Harry Potter and the Cursed Child garnered eleven Laurence Olivier Awards nominations at the 2017 ceremony, tying the record set in 2008 by Hairspray, and won a record-breaking nine: Best New Play, Best Director, Best Actor (Jamie Parker), Best Actress in a Supporting Role (Noma Dumezweni), Best Actor in a Supporting Role (Anthony Boyle), Best Costume Design, Best Set Design, Best Sound Design, and Best Lighting Design. The London production was also nominated for Best Theatre Choreographer and Outstanding Achievement in Music.

==== Tony Awards ====
Harry Potter and the Cursed Child received ten nominations at the 72nd Tony Awards, winning six awards: Best Play, Best Scenic Design in a Play, Best Costume Design in a Play, Best Lighting Design in a Play, Best Sound Design of a Play, and Best Direction of a Play. The play was also nominated for Best Performance by a Leading Actor in a Play (Parker), Best Performance by a Featured Actor in a Play (Boyle), Best Performance by a Featured Actress in a Play (Dumezweni), and Best Choreography.

== Other media ==
=== Stage play ===
In December 2013, J. K. Rowling announced that she was working on a Harry Potter–based play, and in June 2015 it was officially titled Harry Potter and the Cursed Child. The two-part, West End stage play, written by British playwright Jack Thorne, is based on an original story by Thorne, John Tiffany and Rowling. It is directed by Tiffany with choreography by Steven Hoggett, set design by Christine Jones, costume design by Katrina Lindsay, lighting design by Neil Austin, music by Imogen Heap, and sound design by Gareth Fry. The story begins nineteen years after the events of Deathly Hallows and follows Harry Potter, now a Ministry of Magic employee, and his younger son Albus Severus Potter, who is about to attend Hogwarts. On 20 December 2015, it was announced that Jamie Parker, Noma Dumezweni and Paul Thornley would play Harry Potter, Hermione Granger and Ron Weasley respectively. The play debuted at the Palace Theatre, London on 7 June 2016 in previews, with the official opening on 30 July. The script was released in book form the day after the play's world premiere. The play opened on Broadway at the redesigned Lyric Theatre, New York City on 22 April 2018. Parker, Dumezweni, and Thornley reprised their roles on Broadway with Poppy Miller, Sam Clemmett, Alex Price, and Anthony Boyle also reprising their roles as Ginny Potter, Albus Potter, Draco Malfoy, and Scorpius Malfoy, respectively. Tom Felton was set to reprise his film role Draco Malfoy in the Broadway production for several months beginning in November 2025. Rupert Grint is set to reprise his film role as Ron Weasley in the Broadway production from February 2027.

Production	Venue/location	First preview	Opening night	Closing night
West End (London)	Palace Theatre	7 June 2016 (Part One), 9 June 2016 (Part Two)	30 July 2016	Currently running
Broadway (New York)	Lyric Theatre	16 March 2018 (Part One), 17 March 2018 (Part Two)	22 April 2018	Currently running
Melbourne	Princess Theatre	18 January 2019 (Part One), 19 January 2019 (Part Two)	23 February 2019	9 July 2023
San Francisco	Curran Theatre	23 October 2019 (Part One), 24 October 2019 (Part Two)	1 December 2019	11 September 2022
Hamburg	Mehr! Theater	7 February 2020 (Part One), 8 February 2020 (Part Two)	5 December 2021	26 July 2026
Toronto	Ed Mirvish Theatre	19 June 2022	31 May 2022	2 July 2023
Tokyo	TBS Akasaka ACT Theater	16 June 2022	8 July 2022	Currently running

=== Digital publication ===
In June 2011, Rowling launched a website announcing an upcoming project called Pottermore, where all future Harry Potter projects, and all electronic downloads, would be concentrated. Pottermore opened to the general public on 14 April 2012. Pottermore allows users to be sorted, be chosen by their wand and play various minigames. The main purpose of the website was to allow the user to journey through the story with access to content not revealed by J. K. Rowling previously, with over 18,000 words of information on characters, places and objects in the Harry Potter universe. In September 2015, the website launched a newly designed site containing news, features and articles plus previously unreleased writing by Rowling and removed some features including the interactive Moment illustrations, House Cup and Sorting ceremony. A newly designed Sorting Ceremony was subsequently launched on 28 January 2016 in which users could reclaim their old house or be re-sorted. The site was rebranded as WizardingWorld.com in 2019 and then as HarryPotter.com in 2024.

In spring 2024, Pottermore Publishing and Audible announced a new upcoming full-cast audio book series that would feature over 100 voice actors to be released in late 2025. The first cast members were announced in August 2025, including Hugh Laurie, Matthew Macfadyen, Riz Ahmed and Arabella Stanton, the latter of whom is also playing Hermione in the new TV series.

=== Theme parks ===
The Wizarding World of Harry Potter are a group of themed areas at Universal Destinations & Experiences based on the Harry Potter media franchise, adapting elements from the film series and original novels by Rowling. The areas were designed by Universal Creative under an exclusive licence with Warner Bros. Entertainment. It opened on 18 June 2010 as a new land themed to Hogsmeade in the Universal Islands of Adventure theme park at Universal Orlando Resort in Orlando, Florida, and a new land themed to Diagon Alley on 8 July 2014 at the Universal Studios Florida theme park. In January 2024, Universal Orlando Resort announced a third expansion titled The Wizarding World of Harry Potter – Ministry of Magic, which opened on 22 May 2025 at the Universal Epic Universe theme park. The area is themed to 1920s wizarding Paris from the Fantastic Beasts film series. The flagship ride, Harry Potter and the Battle at the Ministry, brings riders to the 1990s British Ministry of Magic via the Floo network and a time turner, where they become involved in the trial of Dolores Umbridge.

On 15 July 2014, The Wizarding World of Harry Potter opened at the Universal Studios Japan theme park in Osaka, Japan. It includes the village of Hogsmeade, the Harry Potter and the Forbidden Journey ride, and the Flight of the Hippogriff roller coaster. On 7 April 2016, The Wizarding World of Harry Potter opened at the Universal Studios Hollywood theme park near Los Angeles, California. On 20 September 2021, The Wizarding World of Harry Potter opened at the Universal Studios Beijing theme park in Beijing, China.

=== Exhibitions and Events ===
==== Warner Bros. Studio Tours – The Making of Harry Potter ====
The Warner Bros. Studio Tour London – The Making of Harry Potter opened on 31 March 2012 in Leavesden, southeast England with a grand opening that featured many of the Harry Potter cast and crew. It houses a permanent exhibit of authentic costumes, props and sets utilized in the production of the Harry Potter films, as well as behind-the-scenes production of visual effects. Each tour session typically lasts three and a half hours, and the tour has the capacity to handle 6,000 visitors daily. TripAdvisor reported that it has been the highest-rated attraction worldwide every year since the tour opened. Announced in August 2020, Warner Bros. Studio Tour Tokyo – The Making of Harry Potter is an attraction in Tokyo, Japan, that opened in the first half of 2023. Similar to its counterpart in London, the 30,000 square-meter attraction in Tokyo offers visitors a walking tour through some of the recreated famous film sets including the Great Hall, the Forbidden Forest, and the Diagon Alley. In February 2025, Warner Bros. has announced plans to open the Warner Bros. Studio Tour Shanghai – The Making of Harry Potter.

==== Harry Potter Shops ====
The Harry Potter Shop at Platform 9 3/4 opened on 14 December 2012 and is located in King's Cross Station, London and next to it there is an opportunity to take a photo at the trolley. The Harry Potter Store New York opened on 3 June 2021 and consists of 3 floors with an area over 20,000 square feet. It includes unique VR experiences. The Harry Potter Shop in Gatwick Airport, England is located in its North Terminal and the store covers 614 square feet. It opened to the public on 22 November 2018. The Harry Potter Shop in Heathrow Airport, England is located on Terminal 5, Level 3 and covers 1000 square feet. It opened on 16 November and covered 600 square feet and then expanded to cover 1000 square feet and re-opened on 9 August 2018.

There are also unofficial stores based on the Wizarding World and J. K. Rowling including: Emporio Stregato in Rimini, Italy.

Back to Hogwarts

On 1 September 2017, identified by Rowling as the date the events at Kings Cross in the epilogue of the seventh book and the beginning of the stage play take place, the official Harry Potter website promoted activities using the hashtag #BacktoHogwarts, including a livestream of Kings Cross, where actor Warwick Davis made an in-person appearance with fans. The date had been popularized on social media starting in 2015 with posts by Rowling about Harry's son James starting at Hogwarts. In the following years on the day, Warner Brothers continued to organize in person and virtual events at Kings Cross and around the world with appearances by actors such as Tom Felton and Eddie Redmayne and made announcements about products and experiences related to the franchise. Variety reported in 2023 that "Back to Hogwarts Day has morphed into a global phenomenon, with Warner Bros. Discovery now taking charge of proceedings" and cited a Warner Brothers representative in noting that Kings Cross Station had to close its doors at 11 a.m. due to the large number of fans. On the date in 2024, fans showed up at King's Cross Station even though no event was held and fans were discouraged from attending, reportedly due to the crowding issues the year before, and booed when no Hogwarts Express announcement was made at 11 a.m. as in previous years. The organizers had encouraged fans to participate in virtual events, while in-person events were held at other locations like Grand Central Terminal in New York City and Hamburg, Germany, after promoting in-person attendance at Kings Cross in previous years.

==== Harry Potter: The Exhibition ====
Harry Potter: The Exhibition is a travelling exhibition ran by GES that originally opened in April 2009 at the Museum of Science and Industry in Chicago, United States. It travelled across 14 countries with its last stop being in Lisbon, Portugal until March 2020 when it closed early due to COVID-19. It was announced early 2021 that the exhibition would be rebooted and ran by Imagine Exhibitions and was set to open in 2022. It is currently open at the Franklin Institute, Philadelphia. It opened at Paris Expo Porte de Versailles, Paris in Spring 2023, and it opened in December 2023 in Macao.

==== Harry Potter Photographic Exhibition ====
The Harry Potter Photographic Exhibition opened on 12 July 2021 in Covent Garden, London. It includes a display of behind-the-scenes images and features London's only Butterbeer Bar. It closed on 15 December 2022, a year after its opening.

==== History of Magic Exhibition ====
The History of Magic was an exhibition which was at the British Library from 20 October 2017 to 28 February 2018 as part of 20th anniversary celebrations. The British Library also installed smaller displays on the same topic in 22 libraries across the United Kingdom. The exhibition was a collaboration between the British Library, Bloomsbury, and author J. K. Rowling. There was also a similar exhibition in New York City which opened on 5 October 2018 to 27 January 2019. While some of the same artefacts from the British Library were displayed, additional materials dealing with real-word magic in the Americas were shown. On 27 February 2018, as the British Library was preparing to close the original exhibition, Google made the exhibition available online world-wide using their Google Arts & Culture platform.

==== Fantastic Beasts: The Wonder of Nature Exhibition ====
Fantastic Beasts: The Wonder of Nature was open from 9–15 December 2020 and from 17 May 2021 to 3 January 2022 at the London Natural History Museum. It consisted of creatures, specimens and artefacts from the museum's scientific collection displayed side by side with elements from the Wizarding World as well as digital installations. This exhibit featured 100 objects, including props from the Fantastic Beasts and Harry Potter films. There is a similar exhibition that opened at the Royal Ontario Museum in Toronto, Canada on 11 June 2022 through 2 January 2023. The exhibition is also set to open at Melbourne museum on 19 May 2023 through 8 October 2023.

==== Harry Potter Film Concert Series ====
The Harry Potter Film Concert Series is a global concert tour announced in 2016 as a partnership between WarnerBros and CineConcert. The concerts involve a screening of the film alongside the film's complete score played live by local orchestras. It premiered at Philadelphia's Mann Center for the Performing Arts on 23 June 2016. There have since been over 1,400 performances in 48 countries around the world with over three million fans.

==== Forbidden Forest Experience ====
The Forbidden Forest Experience is a nighttime woodland trail with creatures and other experiences from the Harry Potter and Fantastic Beasts films. Some of the experiences include casting spells using a wand and eating food and drinks from the Harry Potter world at the themed village. It is currently running in Shenzhen, China. The experience was held previously in twelve other locations: Vancouver in Canada, Austin, Chicago, Cincinnati, Leesburg, Little Elm, Westchester in the US; Melbourne and Brisbane in Australia; Montauban in France; Brussels in Belgium; Cheshire in the UK; and Singapore.

==== Harry Potter Land, Warner Bros World Abu Dhabi ====
An extensive new Harry Potter themed land was announced to be coming to Yas Island, as part of the world's largest indoor theme park, Warner Bros. World Abu Dhabi on 10 November 2022 by Warner Bros Discovery and Miral.

=== Books ===
Title	Publication date	Writer(s)	Ref.
J.K. Rowling's Wizarding World: Movie Magic Volume One – Extraordinary People and Fascinating Places	18 October 2016	Jody Revenson	
J.K. Rowling's Wizarding World: A Pop-up Gallery of Curiosities	1 November 2016	James Diaz (illustrated by Sergio Gómez Silván)	
J.K. Rowling's Wizarding World: Movie Magic Volume Two – Curious Creatures	14 March 2017	Ramin Zahed	
J.K. Rowling's Wizarding World: Magical Film Projections – Creatures	4 April 2017	Compiled by Insight Editions	
J.K. Rowling's Wizarding World: The Dark Arts – A Movie Scrapbook	6 June 2017	Jody Revenson	
Harry Potter: Magical Film Projections – Patronus Charm	4 July 2017	Insight Editions	
J.K. Rowling's Wizarding World: Movie Magic Volume Three – Amazing Artifacts	27 September 2017	Bonnie Burton	

=== Video games ===
Title	Release date	Publisher(s)	Developer(s)	Platform(s)
Video games
Lego Creator: Harry Potter	1 November 2001	Lego Software	Superscape	Microsoft Windows
Harry Potter and the Philosopher's Stone	16 November 2001	Electronic Arts	Argonaut Games	PlayStation
Harry Potter and the Philosopher's Stone	16 November 2001	Electronic Arts	KnowWonder	Microsoft Windows
Harry Potter and the Philosopher's Stone	16 November 2001	Electronic Arts	Griptonite Games	Game Boy Color, Game Boy Advance
Harry Potter and the Philosopher's Stone	28 February 2002	Aspyr	Westlake Interactive	macOS
Harry Potter and the Philosopher's Stone	9 December 2003	Electronic Arts	Warthog	PlayStation 2, Xbox, GameCube
Harry Potter and the Chamber of Secrets	15 November 2002	Electronic Arts	EA UK	PlayStation 2
Harry Potter and the Chamber of Secrets	15 November 2002	Electronic Arts	Eurocom Entertainment Software	Xbox, GameCube, Game Boy Advance
Harry Potter and the Chamber of Secrets	15 November 2002	Electronic Arts	Argonaut Games	PlayStation
Harry Potter and the Chamber of Secrets	15 November 2002	Electronic Arts	KnowWonder	Microsoft Windows
Harry Potter and the Chamber of Secrets	15 November 2002	Electronic Arts	Griptonite Games	Game Boy Color
Harry Potter and the Chamber of Secrets	16 April 2003	Aspyr	Westlake Interactive	macOS
Lego Creator: Harry Potter and the Chamber of Secrets	1 December 2002	Electronic Arts	Qube Software	Microsoft Windows
Harry Potter: Quidditch World Cup	28 October 2003	Electronic Arts	EA UK	Microsoft Windows, PlayStation 2, Xbox, GameCube
Harry Potter: Quidditch World Cup	28 October 2003	Electronic Arts	Magic Pockets	Game Boy Advance
Harry Potter and the Prisoner of Azkaban	25 May 2004	Electronic Arts	KnowWonder	Microsoft Windows
Harry Potter and the Prisoner of Azkaban	25 May 2004	Electronic Arts	Griptonite Games	Game Boy Advance
Harry Potter and the Prisoner of Azkaban	29 May 2004	Electronic Arts	EA UK	PlayStation 2, Xbox, GameCube
Harry Potter: Find Scabbers	19 August 2005	Warner Bros. Digital Distribution	–	Various mobile devices
Harry Potter and the Goblet of Fire	8 November 2005	Electronic Arts	EA UK	Microsoft Windows, PlayStation 2, Xbox, GameCube
Harry Potter and the Goblet of Fire	8 November 2005	Electronic Arts	Magic Pockets	Game Boy Advance, Nintendo DS
Harry Potter and the Goblet of Fire	15 November 2005	Electronic Arts	EA UK	PlayStation Portable
Harry Potter and the Order of the Phoenix	15 June 2007	EA Mobile		Various mobile devices
Harry Potter and the Order of the Phoenix	25 June 2007	Electronic Arts	EA UK	Microsoft Windows, PlayStation 2, PlayStation 3, Xbox 360, Wii
Harry Potter and the Order of the Phoenix	25 June 2007	Electronic Arts	Rebellion Developments	PlayStation Portable
Harry Potter and the Order of the Phoenix	25 June 2007	Electronic Arts	Visual Impact	Nintendo DS
Harry Potter and the Order of the Phoenix	10 July 2007	Electronic Arts	Visual Impact	Game Boy Advance
Harry Potter and the Order of the Phoenix	21 August 2007	Electronic Arts	EA UK	macOS
Harry Potter: Mastering Magic	30 March 2008	EA Mobile	EA Romania	Various mobile devices
Harry Potter and the Half-Blood Prince	30 June 2009	Electronic Arts	EA Bright Light	Microsoft Windows, macOS, PlayStation 2, PlayStation 3, Xbox 360, Wii, Nintendo DS, PlayStation Portable
Harry Potter and the Half-Blood Prince	30 June 2009	EA Mobile		Various mobile devices
Lego Harry Potter: Years 1–4	29 June 2010	Warner Bros. Interactive Entertainment	TT Games	Microsoft Windows, PlayStation 3, Xbox 360, Wii
Lego Harry Potter: Years 1–4	29 June 2010	Warner Bros. Interactive Entertainment	TT Fusion	Nintendo DS, PlayStation Portable
Lego Harry Potter: Years 1–4	19 November 2010	Warner Bros. Interactive Entertainment	TT Fusion	iOS
Lego Harry Potter: Years 1–4	5 January 2011	Feral Interactive	Feral Interactive; Open Planet Software	macOS
Lego Harry Potter: Years 1–4	27 September 2016	Warner Bros. Interactive Entertainment	TT Fusion	Android
Lego Harry Potter: Years 1–4	18 October 2016	Warner Bros. Interactive Entertainment	TT Games	PlayStation 4
Lego Harry Potter: Years 1–4	30 October 2018	Warner Bros. Interactive Entertainment	TT Games	Xbox One, Nintendo Switch
Harry Potter and the Deathly Hallows – Part 1	16 November 2010	Electronic Arts	EA Bright Light	Microsoft Windows, PlayStation 3, Xbox 360, Wii
Harry Potter and the Deathly Hallows – Part 1	16 November 2010	Electronic Arts	Full Fat	Nintendo DS
Harry Potter and the Deathly Hallows – Part 1	16 November 2010	EA Mobile		Various mobile devices
Harry Potter and the Deathly Hallows – Part 2	11 July 2011	Gameloft		Various mobile devices
Harry Potter and the Deathly Hallows – Part 2	12 July 2011	Electronic Arts	EA Bright Light	Microsoft Windows, PlayStation 3, Xbox 360, Wii
Harry Potter and the Deathly Hallows – Part 2	12 July 2011	Electronic Arts	Full Fat	Nintendo DS
Lego Harry Potter: Years 5–7	11 November 2011	Warner Bros. Interactive Entertainment	TT Games	Microsoft Windows, PlayStation 3, Xbox 360, Wii
Lego Harry Potter: Years 5–7	11 November 2011	Warner Bros. Interactive Entertainment	TT Fusion	Nintendo DS, PlayStation Portable, Nintendo 3DS, PlayStation Vita
Lego Harry Potter: Years 5–7	7 March 2012	Feral Interactive	TT Games	macOS
Lego Harry Potter: Years 5–7	3 May 2012	Warner Bros. Interactive Entertainment	TT Fusion	iOS
Lego Harry Potter: Years 5–7	27 September 2016	Warner Bros. Interactive Entertainment	TT Fusion	Android
Lego Harry Potter: Years 5–7	18 October 2016	Warner Bros. Interactive Entertainment	TT Games	PlayStation 4
Lego Harry Potter: Years 5–7	30 October 2018	Warner Bros. Interactive Entertainment	TT Games	Xbox One, Nintendo Switch
Harry Potter for Kinect	9 October 2012	Warner Bros. Interactive Entertainment	Eurocom	Xbox 360
Fantastic Beasts: Cases from the Wizarding World	17 November 2016	Warner Bros. Interactive Entertainment	Mediatonic; WB Games San Francisco	Android, iOS
Harry Potter: Hogwarts Mystery	25 April 2018	Jam City		Android, iOS
Harry Potter: Puzzles & Spells	23 September 2020	Zynga		Android, iOS, Fire OS, Facebook
Harry Potter: Magic Awakened	9 September 2021	NetEase	Zen Studios	Android, iOS
Harry Potter: Magic Awakened	27 June 2023	Warner Bros. Games	Zen Studios	Android, iOS
Hogwarts Legacy	10 February 2023	Warner Bros. Games	Avalanche Software	Microsoft Windows, PlayStation 4, PlayStation 5, Xbox One, Xbox Series X/S, Nintendo Switch
Harry Potter: Quidditch Champions	3 September 2024	Warner Bros. Games	Unbroken Studios	Microsoft Windows, PlayStation 4, PlayStation 5, Xbox One, Xbox Series X/S, Nintendo Switch
Augmented reality games
Book of Spells	13 November 2012	Sony Computer Entertainment	London Studio	PlayStation 3
Book of Potions	12 November 2013	Sony Computer Entertainment	London Studio	PlayStation 3
Harry Potter: Wizards Unite	21 June 2019	Niantic	Niantic; WB Games San Francisco	Android, iOS
Virtual reality games
Fantastic Beasts and Where to Find Them VR Experience	10 November 2016	Warner Bros. Interactive Entertainment	Framestore	Google Daydream
Fantastic Beasts and Where to Find Them VR Experience	23 January 2018	Warner Bros. Interactive Entertainment	Framestore	HTC Vive, Oculus Rift, Samsung Gear VR

== See also ==
- Fictional universe of Harry Potter
- Places in Harry Potter
