= John Eliot Gardiner =

English conductor (born 1943)

Sir John Eliot Gardiner CBE HonFBA
- Gardiner in 2016
- Born: 20 April 1943 (age 83); Fontmell Magna, Dorset, England
- Education: Bryanston School; King's College, Cambridge; King's College London
- Occupation: Conductor of classical music
- Years active: 1964–Present
- Spouses: Elizabeth Wilcock (m. 1981; div. 1997) Isabella de Sabata (m. 2001; div. 2019)
- Children: 3, including Francesca Gardiner
- Father: Rolf Gardiner
- Relatives: Alan Gardiner (grandfather); H. Balfour Gardiner (great-uncle); Margaret Gardiner (aunt); Martin Bernal (cousin); Howard Hodgkin (cousin)

Sir John Eliot Gardiner (born 20 April 1943) is an English conductor, particularly known for his performances of the works of Johann Sebastian Bach, especially the Bach Cantata Pilgrimage of 2000, performing Bach's church cantatas in liturgical order in churches all over Europe, and New York City with the Monteverdi Choir, and recording them at the locations. He is the author of Music in the Castle of Heaven: A Portrait of Johann Sebastian Bach and presenter of the documentary Bach: A Passionate Life.

== Life and career ==
Born in Fontmell Magna, Dorset, son of Rolf Gardiner and Marabel Hodgkin, Gardiner's early musical experience came largely through singing with his family and in a local church choir. As a child, he grew up with the celebrated Haussmann portrait of J. S. Bach, which had been lent to his parents for safekeeping during the Second World War. A self-taught musician who also played the violin, he began to study conducting at the age of 15. He was educated at Bryanston School, then studied history at King's College, Cambridge, where his tutor was the social anthropologist Edmund Leach.

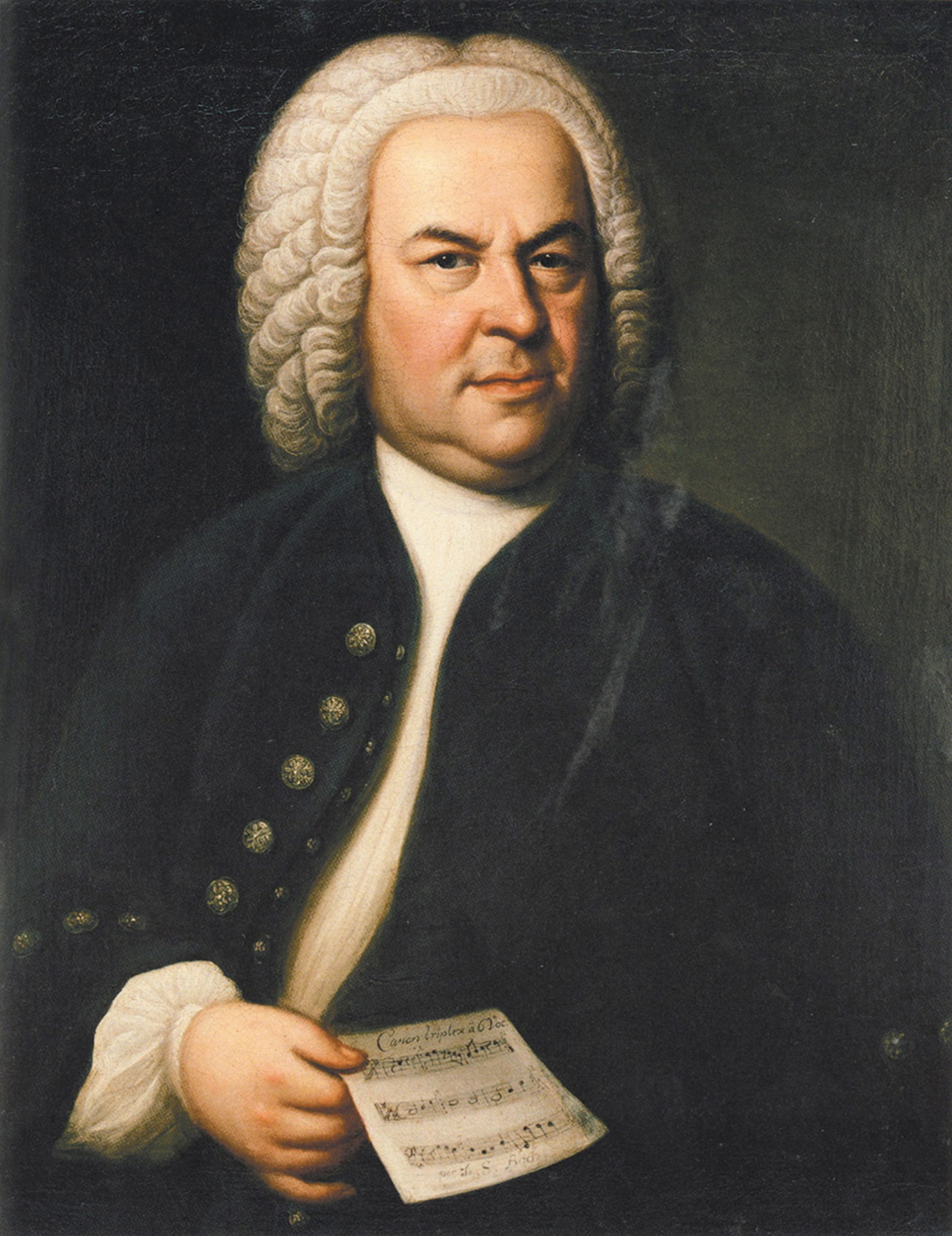
Portrait of Johann Sebastian Bach, by Elias Gottlob Haussmann, which was in Gardiner's childhood home

While an undergraduate at Cambridge, he launched his conducting career with a performance of Monteverdi's Vespro della Beata Vergine in King's College Chapel on 5 March 1964. This either featured or led to the foundation of the Monteverdi Choir, with which he made his London conducting debut at the Wigmore Hall in 1966. Whilst at Cambridge, he conducted the Oxford and Cambridge Singers on a concert tour of the Middle East. After graduating, Gardiner continued his musical studies at King's College London under Thurston Dart and in Paris with Nadia Boulanger, whose music had been a very early influence.

Returning to England, Gardiner joined the BBC Northern Orchestra as an apprentice conductor. In 1968, he founded the Monteverdi Orchestra. Upon changing from modern instruments to period instruments in 1977, the orchestra changed its name to the English Baroque Soloists in 1978. In 1969, Gardiner made his opera debut with a performance of Mozart's The Magic Flute at the English National Opera. Four years later, in 1973, he made his first appearance at the Covent Garden conducting Gluck's Iphigénie en Tauride. The English Baroque Soloists made their opera debut with him in the 1977 Innsbruck Festival of Early Music, performing Handel's Acis and Galatea on period instruments. His American debut came in 1979 when he conducted the Dallas Symphony Orchestra with soloist Robert Hale in a performance of Handel's Messiah. He then became the lead conductor of Canada's CBC Vancouver Orchestra from 1980 to 1983.

After his period with the CBC Vancouver Orchestra, Gardiner went to France. From 1983 to 1988, he was music director of the Opéra National de Lyon. During his period with the Opéra he founded an entirely new orchestra. During his time with the Opéra National de Lyon, Gardiner was also artistic director of the Göttingen Handel Festival (1981 until 1990). In 1989, the Monteverdi Choir had its 25th anniversary, touring the world giving performances of Handel's oratorio Israel in Egypt and Bach's Magnificat among other works. In 1990, Gardiner formed a new period-instrument orchestra, the Orchestre Révolutionnaire et Romantique, to perform music of the 19th century. From 1991 until 1995, he was principal conductor of the North German Radio Symphony Orchestra.

He founded the Monteverdi Choir (1964), the English Baroque Soloists (1978) and the Orchestre Révolutionnaire et Romantique (1989). From the 1990s onwards he undertook more world tours with his ensembles, including:

- A European tour in 1993 with the Orchestre Révolutionnaire et Romantique featured Berlioz's rediscovered Messe solennelle. Beginning in Bremen, Germany the tour ended with a recorded performance in Westminster Cathedral, London 1993.
- In 2000, Gardiner set out on his Bach Cantata Pilgrimage, performing, over a 52-week period, all of Bach's sacred cantatas in churches around Europe and the United States.
- In late 2004, Gardiner toured France and Spain with the Monteverdi Choir performing pieces from the Codex Calixtinus in cathedrals and churches along the Camino de Santiago.

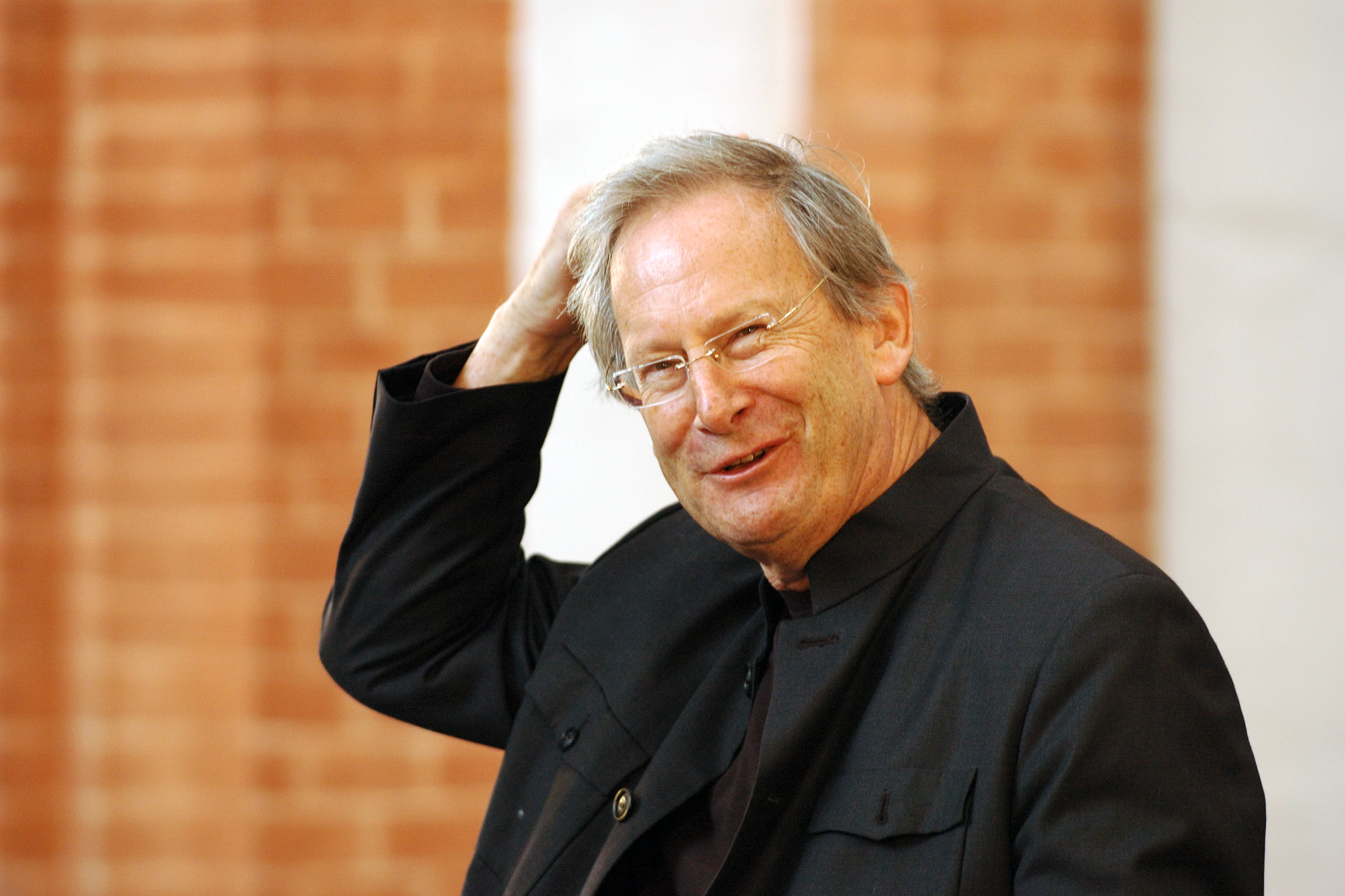
In rehearsal, 2007

Gardiner has recorded over 250 albums, most of which have been published by Deutsche Grammophon and Philips Classics, and by the Soli Deo Gloria label, which specialises in recordings by Gardiner and by his ensembles.

Gardiner is most famous for his interpretations of Baroque music on period instruments with the Monteverdi Choir and the English Baroque Soloists, but his repertoire and discography are not limited to early music. With the Orchestre Révolutionnaire et Romantique, Gardiner has performed a wide range of Classical and Romantic music, including many works of Berlioz and all of Beethoven's symphonies. A recording of the third symphony of the latter was used in a dramatisation by the BBC of Beethoven's writing of that symphony. Gardiner has served as chief conductor of the North German Radio Symphony Orchestra and has appeared as guest conductor with such major orchestras as the Berlin Philharmonic, Boston Symphony Orchestra, Chicago Symphony Orchestra, Cleveland Orchestra, London Symphony Orchestra, Philharmonia, Royal Concertgebouw Orchestra and Vienna Philharmonic. Gardiner is also well known for his refusal to perform the music of Richard Wagner; in a 2008 interview for Gramophone Gardiner said, 'I really loathe Wagner – everything he stands for – and I don't even like his music very much.' Gardiner has been the subject of various allegations of rudeness and bullying of performers and colleagues.

In 2005, he was featured in BBC's Bach Christmas broadcasts. In late 2012, citing health concerns, he cancelled his planned December 2013 tour of Australia with the Monteverdi Choir and the Australian Chamber Orchestra. In 2013, Gardiner published Music in the Castle of Heaven: A Portrait of Johann Sebastian Bach. In 2013, he narrated the BBC Two documentary Bach: A Passionate Life. In 2014, he started a five-year term as president of the Leipzig Bach Archive, being succeeded by Ton Koopman in that position in 2019. One of the realisations during Gardiner's presidency was the Archive's collaboration to the Bach 333 box set with the complete recordings of Johann Sebastian Bach's works, released in 2018.

Gardiner conducted his Monteverdi Choir and English Baroque Soloists in a pre-service concert at Westminster Abbey for the Coronation of Charles III.

In August 2023, Gardiner was reported to have angrily slapped and punched English bass William Thomas in the face in front of cast members at the Berlioz Festival in La Côte Saint André, after Thomas exited the wrong side of the podium after a performance of Les Troyens. The incident resulted in a public backlash against the conductor. On 24 August 2023, Gardiner withdrew from all further engagements for 'a period of reflection and, in consultation with his medical advisors ... focusing on his mental health while engaging in a course of counselling'. In July 2024, it was announced that he would be stepping down as leader and artistic director of the Monteverdi Choir and Orchestras, focusing instead on 'other activities including guest conducting, recording, writing, creative and education projects.'

In September 2024, Gardiner founded the Constellation Choir and Orchestra, following his departure from the Monteverdi Choir and Orchestras earlier that year. The new ensemble attracted several former members of the Monteverdi ensembles, leading to a competitive dynamic between the groups. Some concert venues replaced scheduled Monteverdi performances with those of Gardiner's new ensemble, further intensifying the rivalry.

== Honours and awards ==
Gardiner has received a variety of honours and awards, including:

- Honorary doctorate from the University of Lyon, 1987
- Appointed Commander of the Order of the British Empire (CBE), 1990 New Year Honours, for services to music
- Honorary Fellow of King's College, London and King's College, Cambridge
- Honorary Member of Royal Academy of Music, 1992
- Grammy, Best Choral Performance, 1994
- Appointed Knight Bachelor, 1998 Birthday Honours, for services to music
- Grammy, Best Opera Recording, 1999
- Bach Medal, 2005
- Order of Merit of the Federal Republic of Germany, 2005
- Doctorate Honoris Causa in Musicology at the University of Pavia in Cremona (birthplace of Claudio Monteverdi), 2006
- Bach Prize of the Royal Academy of Music-Kohn Foundation, 2008
- Voted into the Gramophone Hall of Fame in 2012
- Chevalier de la Légion d'honneur, 2011.
- Honorary Degree of Doctor of Music from the University of St Andrews, 2014
- National Book Critics Circle Award (Biography) shortlist for Bach: Music in the Castle of Heaven, 2014
- Honorary Degree of Doctor of Music from the University of Cambridge, 2015
- Honorary Fellow of the British Academy, 2015
- Honorary doctorate from the Franz Liszt Academy of Music, 2023

== Notable recordings ==
Gardiner is primarily known for recording choral and operatic works from the Baroque and early Classical periods, many of which have won international classical music awards. His recordings have won over a dozen Gramophone Classical Music Awards, three Grammy Awards, a German Record Critics' Award, ECHO Klassik Award and an Académie Charles Cros Grand Prix and received several nominations. Most of these recordings are with the Monteverdi Choir and the English Baroque Soloists and various soloists such as Bryn Terfel, Anne Sofie von Otter, Sylvia McNair, Anthony Rolfe Johnson, Barbara Hendricks, Rodney Gilfry, among others. He has also made several recordings of Romantic composers with the Orchestre Révolutionnaire et Romantique, with several works by Berlioz and the symphonies by Beethoven, Schumann, and Brahms. Most of his recordings have been released in collaboration with Archiv Produktion of Deutsche Grammophon. He has also recorded with the music labels Philips and Erato.

- Bach, Christmas Oratorio, recorded with the Monteverdi Choir and English Baroque Soloists, Anthony Rolfe Johnson, Anne Sofie von Otter et al. at Abbey Road Studios, 1987 (DG Archiv), nominated Grammy Award for Best Choral Performance
- Bach, Motets, recorded with the Monteverdi Choir and English Baroque Soloists (DG Archiv)
- Bach, Complete Sacred Cantatas, recorded with the Monteverdi Choir and the English Baroque Soloists, (DG Archiv), winner Gramophone's 2005 Record of the Year and Special Achievement Award (2011), nominated two Grammy Awards Best Choral Performance
- Bach, Mass in B minor recorded with the Monteverdi Choir and the English Baroque Soloists (DG Archiv), nominated Grammy Award for Best Choral Performance
- Bach, St John Passion, recorded with the Monteverdi Choir and the English Baroque Soloists, 1986 (DG Archiv), nominated Grammy Award for Best Choral Performance
- Bach, St Matthew Passion, recorded with the Monteverdi Choir and the English Baroque Soloists and Anne Sofie von Otter, 1985 (DG Archiv), nominated Grammy Award for Best Choral Performance
- Beethoven, Missa solemnis, recorded with the Monteverdi Choir and the Orchestre Révolutionnaire et Romantique, 1990 (DG Archiv), winner of Choral Gramophone Classical Music Award and 1991 Gramophone Record of the Year
- Berlioz, Messe solennelle, recorded with the Monteverdi Choir and the Orchestre Révolutionnaire et Romantique, 1994 (Philips), winner of Grammy Award for Best Choral Performance
- Berlioz, Les Troyens, recorded with the Monteverdi Choir and the Orchestre Révolutionnaire et Romantique, 2004 (DVD, BBC Opus Arte), winner of Gramophone DVD of the Year
- Berlioz Rediscovered: Symphonie Fantastique, Messe solennelle, recorded with the Monteverdi Choir and the Orchestre Révolutionnaire et Romantique, 2018 (Decca), winner of France's 2019 Lex Grands Prix internationaux Du DVD
- Brahms, Ein Deutsches Requiem, recorded with the Monteverdi Choir and the Orchestre Révolutionnaire et Romantique, Charlotte Margiono and Rodney Gilfry, 1990 (Philips)
- Handel, L'Allegro, il Penseroso ed il Moderato, recorded with the Monteverdi Orchestra and Choir, 1980 (Erato), winner of Gramophone Classical Music Award
- Handel, Dixit Dominus and Coronation Anthem no. 1, recorded with the Monteverdi Orchestra and Choir 1978 (Erato), winner of Gramophone Award
- Handel, Jephtha, recorded with the Monteverdi Choir and English Baroque Soloists, Anne Sofie von Otter, Lynne Dawson et al., 1988 (Philips) nominated Grammy Award for Best Choral Performance
- Handel, Messiah, recorded with the Monteverdi Choir and English Baroque Soloists, Catherine Robbin, Margaret Marshall, and Anthony Rolfe Johnson, 1983 (Philips)
- Handel, Solomon, recorded with the Monteverdi Choir and the English Baroque Soloists, Carolyn Watkinson, Nancy Argenta, Barbara Hendricks, Anthony Rolfe Johnson et al., 1985 (Philips)
- Haydn, Die Schöpfung, recorded with the Monteverdi Choir and the English Baroque Soloists, Sylvia McNair, Donna Brown, Gerald Finley, Michael Schade and Rodney Gilfry, 1996 (DG Archiv), winner of Choral Gramophone Classical Music Award, nominated Grammy Award for Best Choral Performance
- Leclair, Scylla et Glaucus, recorded with the Monteverdi Choir and the English Baroque Soloists, 1988 (Erato), winner of Gramophone Classical Music Award
- Monteverdi, L'incoronazione di Poppea, recorded with the English Baroque Soloists, Sylvia McNair, Anne Sofie von Otter et al., 1996 (DG Archiv), winner of 1997 German Record Critics' Award
- Monteverdi, L'Orfeo, recorded with the Monteverdi Choir and Orchestra, Anthony Rolfe Johnson, Julianne Baird, Anne Sofie von Otter, Lynne Dawson, Nancy Argenta et al., 1985 (DG Archiv)
- Monteverdi, Vespro Della Beata Vergine, recorded live with the Monteverdi Choir and Orchestra at St. Jude on the Hill, 1974 (Decca)
- Monteverdi, Vespro Della Beata Vergine, recorded live with the Monteverdi Choir, The English Baroque Soloists, Bryn Terfel et al. at St Mark's Basilica, 1989 (DG Archiv)
- Mozart, Don Giovanni, live recording with the Monteverdi Choir and the English Baroque Soloists, Rodney Gilfrey, Ildebrando D'Arcangelo, Charlotte Margiono, Christoph Prégardien, Ľuba Orgonášová et al., 1995 (DG, Archiv), nominated for Grammy Award for Best Opera Recording
- Mozart, Great Mass in C Minor with the Monteverdi Choir and the English Baroque Soloists, Sylvia McNair, Cornelius Hauptmann et al., 1986 (Philips)
- Mozart, Idomeneo, recorded with the Monteverdi Choir and the English Baroque Soloists, Sylvia McNair, Anne Sofie von Otter et al. (DG Archiv), winner of Gramophone Classical Music Award, nominated for Grammy Award for Best Opera Recording
- Mozart, The Marriage of Figaro, live recording with the Monteverdi Choir and the English Baroque Soloists, Bryn Terfel, Rodney Gilfry, Hillevi Martinpelto, Alison Hagley et al. 1994 (DG, Archiv)
- Stravinsky, The Rake's Progress, recorded with the Monteverdi Choir and London Symphony Orchestra, Bryn Terfel, Anne Sofie von Otter et al., 1999 (DG), winner of Grammy Award for Best Opera Recording

== Personal life ==
Gardiner is the son of the British rural revivalist and Nazi sympathizer Rolf Gardiner (1902–1971), and the grandson of the Egyptologist Alan Gardiner (1879–1963). His mother, Marabel Hodgkin, was a member of the Hodgkin family, a notable Quaker family; the artist Sir Howard Hodgkin (1932–2017) was Gardiner's first cousin.

Gardiner was married to violinist Elizabeth Wilcock from 1981 to 1997; they have three daughters, including screenwriter and showrunner Francesca Gardiner. From 2001 to 2019, he was married to Isabella de Sabata, granddaughter of conductor Victor de Sabata.

In his spare time, Gardiner runs a farm at Springhead near Fontmell Magna in Dorset, which was established by his great-uncle, composer Henry Balfour Gardiner. His continued involvement in this project has earned him the nickname 'Uphill Gardiner' as a consequence of his unorthodox farming methods.

In August 2014, Gardiner was one of 200 public figures who were signatories to a letter to The Guardian opposing Scottish independence in the run-up to September's referendum on that subject.

== Behavior allegations and controversies ==
=== 2023 Festival Berlioz incident ===
In August 2023, during the Festival Berlioz in La Côte-Saint-André, France, Gardiner was involved in a physical altercation with 29-year-old English bass soloist William Thomas. Following a performance of Berlioz's Les Troyens with the Orchestre Révolutionnaire et Romantique and the Monteverdi Choir, Gardiner allegedly slapped and punched Thomas backstage because the singer had exited the podium on the wrong side.

Following the incident, Gardiner withdrew from all remaining engagements for the year, including a scheduled appearance at the BBC Proms. He issued a public apology to Thomas and the other artists, stating that he made no excuses for his behavior and that "physical violence is never acceptable." Representatives for Gardiner initially suggested that extreme heat and a recent change in medication may have provoked the outburst, though he later emphasized that he was seeking specialist help and counselling to better understand his past behaviour and anger management.

In July 2024, after nearly a year away from public music-making, it was announced that Gardiner would permanently step down as the leader and artistic director of the Monteverdi Choir and Orchestras (MCO), the organization he originally founded in 1964. The MCO board noted that they had considered a rehabilitation process, but ultimately concluded that preventing any recurrence of abuse or assault remained their priority. Despite stepping down from the MCO, Gardiner stated he was not retiring. In September 2024, he announced the formation of a new ensemble, the Constellation Choir and Constellation Orchestra.

=== 2026 Leipzig Bach Festival incident ===
On June 16, 2026, another incident occurred during the Leipzig Bach Festival at St. Thomas Church. During the final applause, a festival staff member approached Gardiner to present him with a commemorative scroll. According to reports, Gardiner took the scroll and attempted to tuck it into the neckline of the employee's shirt. The Bach Archive Leipzig released a statement acknowledging that a conductor had behaved "inappropriately," noting that psychological support was offered to the employee and that the board would formally assess the incident. The staff member reportedly filed a criminal complaint, describing the action as an assault. Gardiner issued a statement vehemently denying any form of assault and characterizing the event as an "unfortunate misunderstanding." He explained that he had been surprised by a tap on the shoulder, was unaware a presentation was planned, and had simply tried to return the scroll by placing it behind her neck chain because her hands were full, though he later apologized personally for the distress caused.

== Selected publications ==
- Music in the Castle of Heaven: A Portrait of Johann Sebastian Bach. Penguin UK. 2013. ISBN 978-1-84614-721-0.

== See also ==
- Soli Deo Gloria record label

Cultural offices
Preceded by no predecessor	Music director, Opéra National de Lyon; 1983–1988	Succeeded by Kent Nagano
Preceded by Günter Wand	Chief conductor, North German Radio Symphony Orchestra; 1991–1995	Succeeded by Herbert Blomstedt
