= Harry Potter: Magic Awakened =

- Developer: Zen Studio
- Publishers: CHN/TW: NetEase; WW: Warner Bros. Games (Note: Published under the Portkey Games label)
- Series: Wizarding World
- Platforms: Microsoft Windows; Android; iOS
- Release: CHN: September 9, 2021; TW: September 9, 2021; WW: June 27, 2023
- Genre: Role-playing video game

Harry Potter: Magic Awakened is a 2021 collectible card role-playing game developed by Zen Studio. NetEase published the game in China and Taiwan, while Warner Bros. Games under its Portkey Games label published elsewhere. The player takes the role of a new student at Hogwarts School of Witchcraft and Wizardry and engages with the magical world of Harry Potter.

The game was released in China and Taiwan on September 9, 2021 and internationally on June 27, 2023 for Microsoft Windows (SEA server only), Android and iOS. The game service will end at March 3, 2027.

On October 29, 2024 Warner Bros. closed its servers in Europe, America, and Oceania.

== Gameplay ==
Harry Potter: Magic Awakened is a collectible card role-playing video game set in the magical world of Harry Potter. As a new student at Hogwarts School of Witchcraft and Wizardry, players will customize their character, buy school supplies at Diagon Alley, be sorted into a house by the Sorting Hat, and join the Dueling Club. Players are able to encounter known characters from the original series and learn spells and charms. The game offers new storylines and challenging trials, and makes players face off against other characters in duels. The game's primary focus is on utilizing cards, which must be employed strategically as spells in duels to secure a win. Combining the cards can result in even stronger spells.

== Synopsis ==
Set ten years after the second wizarding war, the story begins with the player receiving a letter of acceptance to Hogwarts. Accompanied by Rubeus Hagrid, the protagonist visits Diagon Alley to purchase magical items like a wand and an owl as a pet. During their journey on the Hogwarts Express to the castle, the main character interacts with other first-year students. After arriving at Hogwarts, Minerva McGonagall greets everyone in the Great Hall and gives a brief account of the recent Battle of Hogwarts, which led to Lord Voldemort's downfall. (Note: As written in Harry Potter and the Deathly Hallows (2007)) Subsequently, the Sorting Hat sorts the protagonist and their peers into the different Hogwarts houses.

The protagonist begins their term at Hogwarts by going to the first class, focusing on charms, with instruction provided by Filius Flitwick. Shortly after, they join the Duelling Club, engaging in duels against other students.

== Development ==
=== Release ===
In June 2020, NetEase opened sign-ups for an open beta of Harry Potter: Magic Awakened in China. In June 2021, the official game trailer was released, showing some familiar characters, creatures, and scenes from the Harry Potter universe. Aragog and his army of spiders, the pixies from Gilderoy Lockhart's class, and the centaurs from the Forbidden Forest are being featured in the trailer. In September 2021, it was officially released in China. While NetEase publishes the game in mainland China, the game is published by Enyi Games in Taiwan.

In February 2022, it was announced that the game would be launching in the Americas, Europe, and Oceania and will be co-published in those regions by NetEase and Warner Bros. Interactive. A final release date has yet to be announced. The game is expected to be released on Android and iOS, with pre-registration being available since February 2022. In March 2023, the game was soft-launched in a number of select countries.

Harry Potter: Magic Awakened was released internationally on June 27, 2023.

== Reception ==
Reception

Aggregate score
Aggregator	Score
Metacritic	(iOS) 78/100

Review score
Publication	Score
Jeuxvideo.com	15/20

According to review aggregator Metacritic, Harry Potter: Magic Awakened received "generally favorable" reviews.

=== Revenue ===
Within 2 months of the game's release in China, Harry Potter: Magic Awakened generated over $228 million across the Apple App Store and Google Play. By that, the game became the second-highest grossing Harry Potter mobile game and achieved the best launch for a Harry Potter-related mobile game. As of October 2022, Magic Awakened generated a total of $358 million.

The game's global release generated a total revenue of $2.3 million during its first day. Specifically, the NetEase release contributed $1.3 million, while Warner Bros. Games' release added $1 million to the overall earnings.
