= Harry Potter: Wizards of Baking =

Reality competitive cooking show

- Genre: Cooking show
- Created by: Kathleen Finch
- No. of seasons: 3

Production
- Production companies: theoldschool; Twenty Twenty Television; Warner Horizon Unscripted Television

Original release
- Network: Food Network
- Release: November 14, 2024 – present

Harry Potter: Wizards of Baking is a reality show that features nine teams of pastry chefs and cake artists who craft large edible showpieces inspired by moments and themes from the Harry Potter franchise.

The show, hosted by Food Network, was filmed at Leavesden Studios, where the Harry Potter films were shot. The series is available to stream on HBO Max and Food Network.

The show was introduced by Kathleen Finch, Warner Bros. Discovery U. S. Networks' Chairman and CEO. It was produced by Warner Horizon, with Bridgette Theriault and Dan Sacks leading production alognside Robin Ashbrook and Yasmin Schacklebolt from The Old School company.

Hosted by James and Oliver Phelps, the reality show features guest stars including Evanna Lynch, Warwick Davis and Bonnie Wright.

The first season of the show premiered in November 2024 and the second season premiered in November 2025. Food Network renewed for a third season, which premiered in November 2026.

== Overview ==
Nine teams of pastry chefs compete across six episodes to bake showpieces inspired by the books and films, judged by chefs Carla Hall and Jozef Youssef. Each challenge is themed by magical elements.

== Episodes ==
=== Season 1 ===
Number	Episode	Date
1	Platform 9 3/4	14 November 2024
2	Gringotts Wizarding Bank	21 November 2024
3	Diagon Alley	28 November 2024
4	The Forbidden Forest	5 December 2024
5	Dumbledore's Office	12 December 2024
6	The Great Hall	19 December 2024

=== Season 2 ===
Number	Episode	Date
1	The House Duels	November 2, 2025
2	Wizard's Journey	November 9, 2025
3	The Edible Artifacts	November 16, 2025
4	Up to No Good	November 23, 2025
5	Magical Beasts, Being and Creatures	November 30, 2025
6	The Goblet of Fire	December 7, 2025
