= Harry Potter (TV series) =

Upcoming HBO fantasy television series

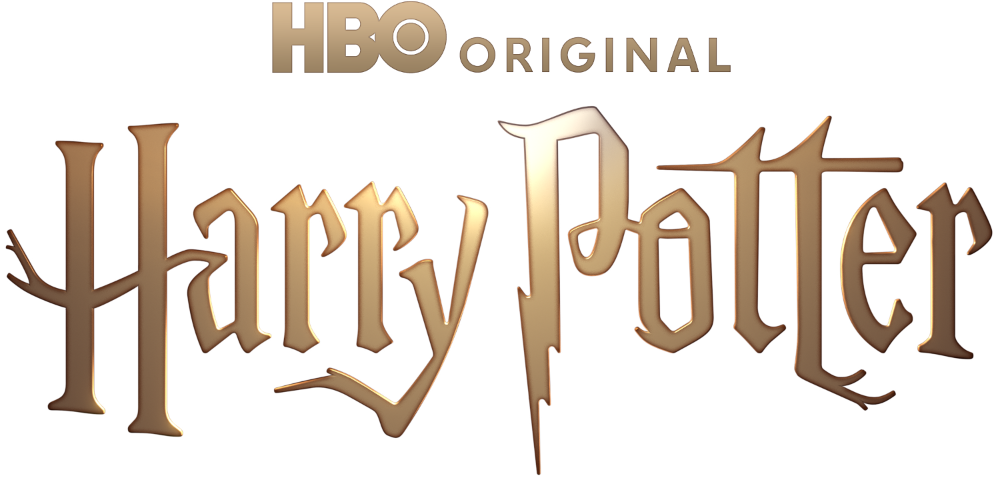
- Genre: Fantasy
- Based on: Harry Potter by J. K. Rowling
- Developed by: Francesca Gardiner
- Showrunners: Francesca Gardiner; Jon Brown
- Directed by: Mark Mylod; Jessica Hobbs; Lucy Forbes; Benjamin Caron
- Starring: Dominic McLaughlin; Alastair Stout; Arabella Stanton; John Lithgow; Janet McTeer; Paapa Essiedu; Nick Frost
- Composer: Hans Zimmer
- Countries of origin: United Kingdom; United States
- Original language: English

Production
- Executive producers: J. K. Rowling; Neil Blair; Ruth Kenley-Letts; Francesca Gardiner; Mark Mylod; David Heyman
- Cinematography: Adriano Goldman; Christophe Nuyens; Mark Patten
- Production companies: Brontë Film & TV; Heyday Television; Warner Bros. Television; HBO Entertainment

Original release
- Network: HBO

Harry Potter is an upcoming fantasy television series developed by Francesca Gardiner for HBO, based on the book series by J. K. Rowling. It is the second screen adaptation of the books, following the film series distributed by Warner Bros. Pictures. Produced by HBO Entertainment, Brontë Film & TV, Heyday Television, and Warner Bros. Television, the series stars Dominic McLaughlin as the title character, with Alastair Stout as Ron Weasley, and Arabella Stanton as Hermione Granger. The principal cast also includes John Lithgow as Albus Dumbledore, Janet McTeer as Minerva McGonagall, Paapa Essiedu as Severus Snape, and Nick Frost as Rubeus Hagrid.

Development on a Harry Potter series was revealed to have begun by January 2021, with plans for its production to span a decade as part of a new adaptation of the books. Creatively led by showrunner Gardiner and director Mark Mylod, casting for major roles began in November 2024, and confirmation came by April 2025. A casting call for the main roles of Harry, Ron, and Hermione was issued in September 2024; after considering 40,000 actors, McLaughlin, Stout, and Stanton were announced as cast in May 2025. Principal photography began that July at Leavesden Studios in Hertfordshire, England.

The first season, titled Harry Potter and the Philosopher's Stone and based on the novel of the same name, consists of eight episodes and is scheduled to premiere in the United States on HBO and globally on HBO Max on 25 December 2026. In May 2026, the series was renewed for a second season which will adapt the second book, Harry Potter and the Chamber of Secrets.

== Premise ==
In the first season, Harry Potter, Ron Weasley, and Hermione Granger experience life at Hogwarts School of Witchcraft and Wizardry, forging strong bonds of friendship as they face the growing danger posed by Lord Voldemort's return.

== Cast and characters ==
=== Main ===
- Dominic McLaughlin as Harry Potter, an 11-year-old orphan raised by his bitter uncle Vernon and aunt Petunia. When he is accepted to Hogwarts School of Witchcraft and Wizardry, he learns of his own fame as a wizard, having survived his parents' murder at the hands of the dark wizard Lord Voldemort as an infant.
- Alastair Stout as Ron Weasley, Harry's best friend at Hogwarts and the second youngest member of the Weasley wizarding family.
- Arabella Stanton as Hermione Granger, a Muggle-born witch; she excels in Hogwarts classes, and becomes the trio's brains. Stanton also voiced a younger Hermione Granger in the audiobook adaptations of the first three books.
- John Lithgow as Albus Dumbledore, Headmaster of Hogwarts and a famous wizard who mentors Harry.
- Janet McTeer as Minerva McGonagall, Professor of Transfiguration at Hogwarts and the Head of Gryffindor House.
- Paapa Essiedu as Severus Snape, Professor of Potions at Hogwarts and the Head of Slytherin House who has a past with Harry's parents.
- Nick Frost as Rubeus Hagrid, a half-Giant and groundskeeper at Hogwarts.
- Rory Wilmot as Neville Longbottom, a fellow Gryffindor student at Hogwarts.
- Lox Pratt as Draco Malfoy, a Slytherin student at Hogwarts who becomes a rival to Harry.
- Leo Earley as Seamus Finnigan, a fellow Gryffindor student at Hogwarts.
- Elijah Oshin as Dean Thomas, a fellow Gryffindor student at Hogwarts.
- Tristan Harland as Fred Weasley, Ron's fourth oldest brother and George's twin.
- Gabriel Harland as George Weasley, Ron's fifth oldest brother and Fred's twin.
- Ruari Spooner as Percy Weasley, Ron's third oldest brother and a Hogwarts prefect.
- Alessia Leoni as Parvati Patil, a fellow Gryffindor student at Hogwarts and twin of Padma.
- Sienna Moosah as Lavender Brown, a fellow Gryffindor student at Hogwarts.
- Finn Stephens as Vincent Crabbe, a fellow Slytherin student at Hogwarts.
- William Nash as Gregory Goyle, a fellow Slytherin student at Hogwarts.
- Warwick Davis as Filius Flitwick, Professor of Charms at Hogwarts and the Head of Ravenclaw House. Davis reprises his role from the film series.
- Sirine Saba as Pomona Sprout, Professor of Herbology at Hogwarts and the Head of Hufflepuff House.

=== Recurring ===
- Daniel Rigby as Vernon Dursley, Harry's abusive uncle, with whom he lives following the death of his parents.
- Bel Powley as Petunia Dursley, Harry's abusive aunt, with whom he goes to live following the death of his parents.
- Paul Whitehouse as Argus Filch, the mean-spirited caretaker of Hogwarts. Whitehouse previously portrayed Sir Cadogan in the 2004 film Harry Potter and the Prisoner of Azkaban, though his scenes did not make the final cut.
- Johnny Flynn as Lucius Malfoy, Draco's father who prizes his family's "pure" wizarding blood.
- Bertie Carvel as Cornelius Fudge, the Minister for Magic.
- Luke Thallon as Quirinus Quirrell, Professor of Defence Against the Dark Arts at Hogwarts.
- Katherine Parkinson as Molly Weasley, Ron's mother.
- Gracie Cochrane (season 1) and Bonnie Hill (season 2) as Ginny Weasley, Ron's younger sister.
- Amos Kitson as Dudley Dursley, Harry's spoilt cousin.
- Richard Durden as Cuthbert Binns, ghost-Professor of History of Magic at Hogwarts.
- Louise Brealey as Madam Hooch, the broomstick flying instructor at Hogwarts.
- Bríd Brennan as Madame Poppy Pomfrey, the matron of Hogwarts hospital wing.
- Leigh Gill as Griphook, a goblin employed at the Gringotts Wizarding Bank.
- Anton Lesser as Garrick Ollivander, a wandmaker who owns Ollivanders in Diagon Alley.
- Laila Barwick as Pansy Parkinson, a Slytherin student at Hogwarts and friend of Draco.
- India Moon as Hannah Abbott, a Hufflepuff student at Hogwarts.
- Orson Matthews as Oliver Wood, the Gryffindor Quidditch team Keeper and captain.
- Asha Soetan as Angelina Johnson, a Gryffindor Quidditch team Chaser.
- Eire Farrell as Katie Bell, a Gryffindor Quidditch team Chaser.
- Serrana Su-Ling Bliss as Alicia Spinnet, a Gryffindor Quidditch team Chaser.
- Ethan Smith as Lee Jordan, the Weasley twins' best friend and Quidditch commentator.
- James Trevelyan Buckle as Justin Finch-Fletchley, a Hufflepuff student at Hogwarts.
- Cian Eagle-Service as Ernie MacMillan, a Hufflepuff student at Hogwarts.
- Jazmyn Lewin as Susan Bones, a Hufflepuff student at Hogwarts.
- Anjula Murali as Padma Patil, a Ravenclaw student at Hogwarts and twin of Parvati.
- Aaron Zhao as Terry Boot, a Ravenclaw student at Hogwarts.
- Scarlett Archer as Penelope Clearwater, a Ravenclaw prefect at Hogwarts.
- Eve Walls as Lisa Turpin, a Ravenclaw student at Hogwarts.
- Oliver Croft as Marcus Flint, the Slytherin Quidditch team Chaser and captain.
- James Dowell as Lucian Bole, a Slytherin Quidditch team Beater.
- D'Angelou Osei-Kissiedu as Graham Montague, a Slytherin Quidditch team Chaser.
- Dylan Heath as Adrian Pucey, a Slytherin Quidditch team Chaser.
- Cornelius Brandreth as Terence Higgs, the Slytherin Quidditch team Seeker.
- Eddison Burch as Miles Bletchley, the Slytherin Quidditch team Keeper.
- Henry Medhurst as Peregrine Derrick, a Slytherin Quidditch team Beater.
- Kit Harington as Gilderoy Lockhart (season 2), a celebrity author and the new Defence Against the Dark Arts teacher at Hogwarts.
- Rafe Spall as Arthur Weasley (season 2), the Weasley's father and a Ministry of Magic employee.

=== Guest ===
- Mickey McAnulty as Piers Polkiss, one of Dudley's friends.
- Lambert Wilson as Nicolas Flamel, an alchemist who gained immortality through his creation of the Philosopher's stone.
- Marthe Keller as Perenelle Flamel, Nicolas' wife
- Naomi Wirthner as Madam Malkin, the owner of Madam Malkin's Robes for All Occasions at Diagon Alley
- Peter Serafinowicz as Peeves, a nuisance poltergeist at Hogwarts.
- Harry Gilby as Charlie Weasley, Ron's older brother.
- Jasper Talbot as James Potter, Harry's deceased father.
- Hannah Chinn as Lily Potter, Harry's deceased mother.
- Leo Bill as Nearly Headless Nick, the Gryffindor House Ghost.
- Andrew Brooke as the Bloody Baron, the Slytherin House Ghost.
- Daniel Fearn as the Fat Friar, the Hufflepuff House Ghost.
- Laura Smyth as the Fat Lady, the Gryffindor common room guard portrait.
- David Threlfall as the voice of the Sorting Hat.
- Lenny Rush as Dobby (season 2), a house-elf
- Billy Barratt as Tom Riddle (season 2), the younger version of Voldemort
- Molly Hewitt-Richards as Moaning Myrtle (season 2), a ghost of a deceased Hogwarts student who haunts the second floor girls' bathroom.
- Jasper Ambrose as Colin Creevey (season 2), a Gryffindor student.

== Episodes ==
Harry Potter series 1 episodes
| No. | Title | Directed by | Written by | Original release date | Prod. code | Viewers (millions) |
|---|---|---|---|---|---|---|
| 1 | TBA | Mark Mylod | Francesca Gardiner | 25 December 2026 | TBA | TBD |

== Production ==
Harry Potter is a co-production by HBO, Warner Bros. Television, Brontë Film and TV, and Heyday Films. Showrunner Francesca Gardiner and director Mark Mylod serve as executive producers alongside J. K. Rowling, Neil Blair, Ruth Kenley-Letts, and David Heyman. According to Warner Bros. Discovery global streaming chief JB Perrette, the series is HBO's biggest production to date.

=== Background ===
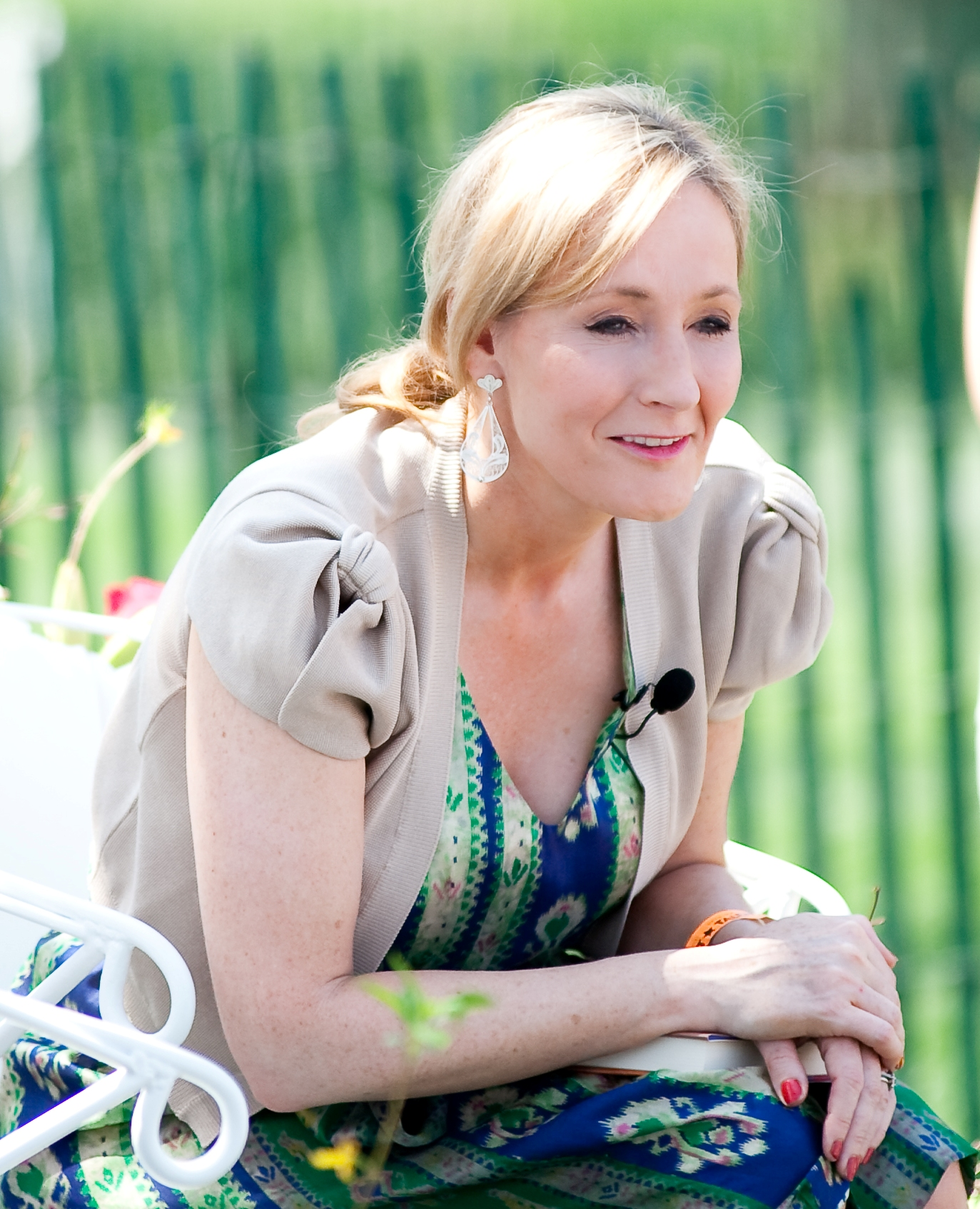
Novelist and executive producer, J. K. Rowling

Harry Potter is a series of seven fantasy novels written by Rowling from 1997 to 2007. From 2001 to 2011, these were adapted into eight eponymous films, with the final book, Deathly Hallows, split into two feature-length films. Both the books and films have had a notable influence on popular culture; the books have been translated into more than 80 languages, and the film series is the fourth highest-grossing film franchise of all time, with the eight films released collectively grossing over $7.7 billion worldwide.

=== Development ===
In January 2021, The Hollywood Reporter revealed that a Harry Potter television series was in early development and that HBO Max executives were looking for potential writers. HBO Max and Warner Bros. denied the report, saying there was no Harry Potter series in development at the studio or on the streaming platform. By May 2022, reports circulated about a meeting between Warner Bros. Discovery CEO David Zaslav and Rowling regarding future HBO Max projects set within the Wizarding World franchise.

In November 2022, it was reported that Warner Bros. Television CEO Channing Dungey shared plans to expand the Wizarding World franchise. In April 2023, at a Warner Bros. investors meeting, it was announced that the series was in development. Warner Bros. Discovery CEO Zaslav revealed plans for the series during a presentation for the new streaming service Max, the successor to HBO Max. The series would span a decade, and each season would be "faithful" to the book series. A search for a showrunner was under way, while David Heyman was in talks to executive produce after serving as a producer of the film series. The first season is expected to cover the entirety of the first book, Harry Potter and the Philosopher's Stone (1997). Rowling was confirmed as an executive producer on the series, which has caused backlash due to her views on transgender people, but HBO and HBO Max chairman and CEO Casey Bloys have reaffirmed her involvement. Neil Blair and Ruth Kenley-Letts were set as executive producers on the series by April 2023.

Deadline Hollywood stated that by February 2024, there was a shortlist of three candidates to be the series' creative leader, including Succession writer Francesca Gardiner. In June, Gardiner was hired as the showrunner and writer, and Mark Mylod was hired to direct several episodes of the series. Moreover, both of them and Heyman were announced as executive producers. As part of a strategy shift for content, Harry Potter was moved from Max streaming to HBO network release in June 2024. The series is planned to be produced for 10 consecutive years, according to comments Bloys and Zaslav made in 2023 and 2025.

In May 2026, HBO renewed the series for a second season, which is expected to cover the entirety of the second book, Harry Potter and the Chamber of Secrets (1998), and promoted Jon Brown to co-showrunner.

=== Writing ===
Andy Greenwald, Bijan Sheibani, Josephine Gardiner, Laura Neal, Martha Hillier, Ripley Parker, Sam Holcroft, Ted Cohen and Jon Brown serve as writers on the series, alongside Francesca Gardiner. Rowling offered positive feedback on the scripts of the first two episodes on social media in June 2025, adding she had "worked closely" with the writers; however, she was not going to get any writing credits. By November 2025, writing for the second season had already begun.

=== Casting ===
Led by casting directors Lucy Bevan and Emily Brockmann, in September 2024, a casting call was released looking for child actors to portray Harry Potter, Ron Weasley, and Hermione Granger, searching for children aged 9–11 as of April 2025 who were residents of the UK and Ireland, describing that agents were to submit "qualified performers, without regard to ethnicity, sex, disability, race, sexual orientation, and gender identity". 40,000 actors auditioned for those roles. In-person auditions were held in Manchester, Scotland, Ireland and Cardiff.

By December 2024, a decision on the casting of the main characters was expected to be reached "relatively soon". In May 2025, Dominic McLaughlin, Alastair Stout, and Arabella Stanton were cast as Harry, Ron and Hermione. McLaughlin auditioned in Glasgow with a poem he had written about a weekend in his life, convicing casting directors with his "quiet confidence." Bevan commented: "He's skeptical of the adult world. He's got a vulnerability and a melancholy and a solitary quality to him." Stout auditioned in Manchester, with the directors finding him "charming and funny from the word 'go." Stanton auditioned in London, performing William Ernest Henley's poem Invictus (1875) and a more humorous scene.

From November to December 2024, various actors were being considered for roles in the series. These included Mark Rylance and Mark Strong for Albus Dumbledore, Paapa Essiedu for Severus Snape, Sharon Horgan and Rachel Weisz for Minerva McGonagall, and Brett Goldstein for Rubeus Hagrid. In February 2025, John Lithgow entered final negotiations to portray Dumbledore, and he announced his casting soon after. In March, Essiedu was nearing a deal to portray Snape, while Janet McTeer and Nick Frost entered negotiations to play McGonagall and Hagrid. In April 2025, Lithgow, McTeer, Essiedu, and Frost were confirmed to star in the series, with Luke Thallon and Paul Whitehouse joining the cast in recurring roles as Quirinus Quirrell and Argus Filch. In March 2026, Essiedu revealed that he had received death threats and racist abuse on social media because of the casting.

The following month, the additional cast announced were Katherine Parkinson as Molly Weasley, Lox Pratt as Draco Malfoy, Johnny Flynn as Lucius Malfoy, Leo Earley as Seamus Finnigan, Alessia Leoni as Parvati Patil, Sienna Moosah as Lavender Brown, Bel Powley as Petunia Dursley, Daniel Rigby as Vernon Dursley, and Bertie Carvel as Cornelius Fudge. In July, Rory Wilmot and Amos Kitson were cast in the roles of Neville Longbottom and Dudley Dursley, respectively, while Louise Brealey joined as Madam Hooch, and Anton Lesser was cast as Garrick Ollivander.

In August, Gracie Cochrane, Tristan Harland, Gabriel Harland, and Ruari Spooner were revealed to have been cast as Ginny Weasley, Fred Weasley, George Weasley, and Percy Weasley, respectively. In September, Warwick Davis was announced to reprise his role of Filius Flitwick, which he previously portrayed in the film series. Additionally, Leigh Gill, Elijah Oshin, Finn Stephens, William Nash, Sirine Saba, Richard Durden, and Bríd Brennan were cast as Griphook, Dean Thomas, Vincent Crabbe, Gregory Goyle, Pomona Sprout, Cuthbert Binns and Poppy Pomfrey, respectively. In October, Lambert Wilson joined the cast as Nicolas Flamel and Marthe Keller as Perenelle Flamel.

In March 2026, casting announcements for many Hogwarts students were announced. In May, it was announced Cochrane would not be returning to play Ginny for the second season due to "unforeseen circumstances". In June, Peter Serafinowicz was cast as Peeves. In August, Nicholas Hoult was cast as Gilderoy Lockhart. Hoult ultimately had to exit the project due to scheduling conflicts, and was replaced by Kit Harington. In September, Billy Barratt and Lenny Rush were respectively cast as Tom Riddle and Dobby, while Bonnie Hill was announced as the new actress to portray Ginny. In the same month, Rafe Spall, Molly Hewitt-Richards, and Jasper Ambrose were cast respectively as Arthur Weasley, Moaning Myrtle, and Colin Creevey. In October, Harry Gilby, Jasper Talbot, and Hannah Chinn were respectively cast as Charlie Weasley, James Potter, and Lily Potter, respectively. In the same month, Leo Bill, Andrew Brooke, Daniel Fearn, Laura Smyth and David Threlfall were respectively cast as Nearly Headless Nick, the Bloody Baron, the Fat Friar, the Fat Lady and the Sorting Hat.

=== Design ===
Holly Waddington serves as the costume designer. For Muggles, she researched what people were wearing in 1991 to make them feel as true as possible. She commented that the Muggles' clothing is "pastel-orientated, very cold colours," with emphasis on synthetic fabrics. The children's Hogwarts uniforms were made mostly of wool, organic cotton shell buttons, wooden buttons and Scottish tartan.

Mara LePere-Schloop serves as the production designer. She mentioned about the "inherent desire to be rooted in naturalism." Animals' prototypes have been created using animatronics, including 10 owls with 36,000 feathers each and two rats playing Scabbers.

=== Filming ===
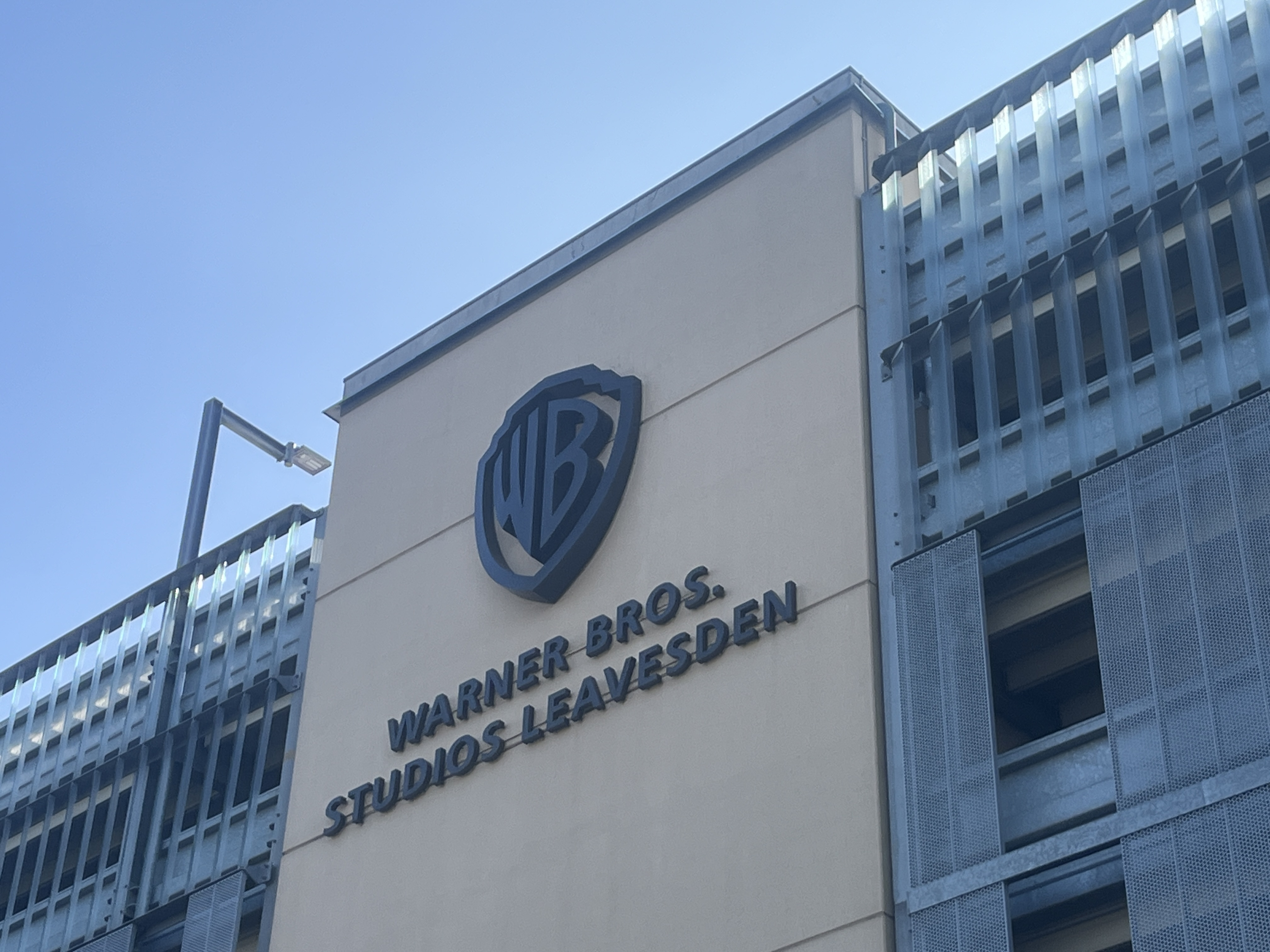
The series is filming mainly at Warner Bros. Studios Leavesden.

Principal photography began on 14 July 2025, under the working title Dark Train, at Warner Bros. Studios Leavesden in Watford, Hertfordshire, where the original eight Harry Potter films were also filmed, with Mylod, Jessica Hobbs, Lucy Forbes, and Benjamin Caron as directors, and Adriano Goldman, Christophe Nuyens, and Mark Patten as cinematographers. A temporary school for the child actors was built at the studio, designed to be used by up to 600 pupils. In May 2025, sets for the series had reportedly already begun to be built. That same month, the film crew spent over a week at the Île de Sein in Brittany, filming around the Tévennec Lighthouse. On 14 July 2025, the first photo from production was released, showing McLaughlin dressed in character. On 17 July, filming was spotted taking place at the London Zoo, with McLaughlin, Powley, Rigby, Kitson, and Mickey McAnulty dressed in character.

On 18 August, filming took place at Borough High Street, in Southwark, London, with McLaughlin and Frost present. On 24 and 25 August, filming occurred at King's Cross station with the actors playing the Weasley family. In mid-September, filming took place in Hoddesdon with Daniel Rigby present, and at Wardown Park in Luton with actors believed to be portraying Lily Potter and James Potter. The following week, Deadline confirmed a report that William, Prince of Wales and Catherine, Princess of Wales, along with their children Prince George of Wales, Princess Charlotte of Wales, and Prince Louis of Wales had visited the Hogsmeade Station set built at Windsor Great Park. In early October, scenes were shot in Cornwall, including Cadgwith, Carnglaze Caverns and Kynance Cove. On 21 October, filming took place on a rooftop in Skipton. By November, production took place in Ashridge with numerous cast members, which is also where the Quidditch World Cup scenes from the film Harry Potter and the Goblet of Fire (2005) were shot.

Filming for the first season was expected to last until mid-2026, with production on the second season set to begin in late 2026. Filming for the second season was already underway in September at Warner Bros. Studios Leavesden.

=== Post-production ===
Alexis Wajsbrot serves as the visual effects supervisor.

== Music ==
Hans Zimmer and his music company, Bleeding Fingers Music, had been revealed to compose the score by January 2026.

== Marketing ==
The teaser trailer was released on 25 March 2026, and became the most-viewed trailer in history for HBO and HBO Max with 277 million views in the first 48 hours. A television special, Finding Harry: The Craft Behind the Magic, was released on 5 April 2026 on HBO and HBO Max. Narrated by Nick Frost, it includes interviews with cast and crew members about producing the series, as well as behind-the-scenes footage.

== Release ==
The series will premiere on HBO in the United States and globally on HBO Max on 25 December 2026. It was previously scheduled to premiere in early 2027 on HBO Max. The first season consists of eight episodes and is titled Harry Potter and the Philosopher's Stone, after the title of the first novel.
