= Harry Potter: Wizards Unite =

2019 video game

- Developers: Niantic; WB Games San Francisco
- Publisher: Niantic
- Series: Wizarding World
- Platforms: Android, iOS
- Release: April 17, 2019 (beta; NZ); May 2, 2019 (beta; AUS); June 20, 2019 (US, UK)
- Genres: Augmented reality, location-based game
- Modes: Single-player; Multiplayer (Fortress Challenges)

Harry Potter: Wizards Unite was an augmented reality (AR) mobile game developed by Niantic and WB Games San Francisco, and published by Niantic, under license from Portkey Games. The game is based on the Harry Potter series and part of the Wizarding World media franchise, created by J. K. Rowling. Wizards Unite begins as the player creates their avatar and starts their journey at the player's real world location. The player character engages with the world by casting spells, discovering artefacts and facing known characters and beasts of the Wizarding World universe.

Development of Wizards Unite commenced in 2017. A beta version was released in New Zealand in April 2019, and in Australia in May 2019. It was launched for Android and iOS mobile devices on June 20, 2019. The game received mixed reviews from critics and won the Peoples' Voice Award for "Technical Achievements" at the 2020 Webby Awards. It was shut down in January 2022, after Portkey Games previously announced to end the service in November 2021.

== Gameplay ==
Harry Potter: Wizards Unite gameplay has been described as similar to that of Pokémon Go, with players able to view the gameplay world through a smartphone. Players are able to visit real-world locations while casting spells, discovering mysterious artefacts, and encountering iconic characters and legendary beasts from the Harry Potter universe. The game allows players to fight against mythical beasts from the Harry Potter and Fantastic Beasts franchise. Players may choose their wizarding house, their wand, and their profession: either Professor, Auror or Magizoologist.

Players must physically travel to explore the game's map and visit fortresses (the two large towers), inns (building in foreground) and greenhouses (two small blue glasshouses).

After creating a game account, the player makes an avatar, whose location depends on the device's geographical location. The player then travels around the real world to find "confounded" items and creatures, and "unconfound" them. The player can also stop at inns (to replenish spell energy), greenhouses (to gain potion ingredients and grow new ingredients), and fortresses (to fight dark wizards and beasts). As the player moves within their real-world surroundings, their avatar moves within the game's map.

In April 2020, Wizards Unite introduced the Knight Bus which allows players to participate in magical challenges in virtual fortresses regardless of their physical location, an answer to the worldwide lockdowns during the COVID-19 pandemic.

== Development ==
Development of Harry Potter: Wizards Unite commenced in 2017. The game was officially announced on November 8, 2017, as an augmented reality mobile game developed by Niantic and WB Games San Francisco, with the former also acting as the publisher. The game was ultimately published under the Portkey Games license.

With Niantic's purchase of Escher Reality, the game was expected to implement new technology to allow for persistent worlds within AR. On November 14, 2018, it was confirmed that the game would be released in 2019.

On November 2, 2021, Portkey Games announced game would be shutting down, which happened at 12:01 a.m. EST on January 31, 2022.

=== Release ===
A first gameplay video for the game was released in March 2019, showing footage defending from a dementor, and being attacked by a werewolf. On March 11, 2019, pre-registration on Google Play opened for the app as well as new in-game footage was released by Niantic. On April 17, 2019, the game was beta released in New Zealand. On April 24, 2019, an email was sent in error stating that the game would launch in Australia for beta testing. On April 26, 2019, the game launched in Australia for beta testing. But several hours later, Niantic confirmed it was another mistake and it was taken down from the App Store. The game was re-released in Australia on May 2, 2019. The game was released in the United States and the United Kingdom on June 20, 2019, a day earlier than previously announced, with additional countries expected to gain access in the days ahead.

== Reception ==
Reception

Aggregate score
Aggregator	Score
Metacritic	(iOS) 64/100

Review scores
Publication	Score
Destructoid	6/10
Game Informer	7/10
IGN	6.7/10
Jeuxvideo.com	15/20

According to review aggregator Metacritic, Harry Potter: Wizards Unite received "mixed or average" reviews, based on 15 reviews for iOS. The game received the People's Voice Award for "Technical Achievement" at the 2020 Webby Awards, while also being named as an Honoree for "Best Game Design" and a nominee for "Family & Kids".

=== Revenue ===
The game generated over US$12 million in revenue in its first month of release. The game's total revenue was estimated at US$37 million by May 2021, with 20 million downloads.
