= Portkey Games =

Video game label

- Type: Division
- Industry: Video games
- Founded: 2017; 9 years ago
- Parent: Warner Bros. Games
- Website: portkeygames.com

Portkey Games is a video game label owned by Warner Bros. Games founded in 2017 and dedicated to creating games of the Wizarding World franchise. In the beginning, the company's primary focus was on publishing mobile games, but in 2023, they diversified by launching Hogwarts Legacy for both PC and consoles.

== Overview ==
Portkey Games was founded in 2017, being committed to producing gaming adventures that are connected to the Wizarding World franchise. The label announced its first game in 2017, working with Pokémon Go creators Niantic to produce a game known as Harry Potter: Wizards Unite. The game would feature the same augmented reality as in Pokémon Go but use characters from the Harry Potter universe.

Later in 2017, before the release of Wizards Unite, Portkey Games also announced a second mobile game in development, called Harry Potter: Hogwarts Mystery. Hogwarts Mystery allows users to play as a Hogwarts student and is set before the events of the Harry Potter series. The game was released exclusively for iOS and Android on April 25, 2018. Portkey Games then released two more mobile games: Harry Potter: Puzzles & Spells in 2020 and Harry Potter: Magic Awakened in 2021. As of October 2022, the four released mobile games accumulated over $1 billion in global revenue.

In 2023, Portkey Games released Hogwarts Legacy, an action role-playing game developed by Avalanche Software. The game is set in the late 1800s and takes place in several Wizarding World locations. Legacy achieved success shortly after its debut, selling 12 million copies and generating $850 million in sales globally within two weeks. It also broke company records for Warner Bros. Games in terms of player engagement, reaching 280 million hours played.

== Releases ==
Year	Title	Developer(s)	Platform(s)	Ref.
2018	Harry Potter: Hogwarts Mystery	Jam City	Android, iOS	
2019	Harry Potter: Wizards Unite	Niantic; WB Games San Francisco	Android, iOS	
2020	Harry Potter: Puzzles & Spells	Zynga	Android, iOS, Fire OS, Facebook	
2021	Harry Potter: Magic Awakened	Zen Studio	Android, iOS, Windows	
2023	Hogwarts Legacy	Avalanche Software	PlayStation 4, PlayStation 5, Windows, Xbox One, Xbox Series X/S, Nintendo Switch, Nintendo Switch 2	
2024	Harry Potter: Quidditch Champions	Unbroken Studios	PlayStation 4, PlayStation 5, Windows, Xbox One, Xbox Series X/S, Nintendo Switch	
