= Francesca Gardiner =

English television writer (born 1983)

- Born: November 1983 (age 42–43)
- Occupation: Screenwriter
- Children: 1
- Relatives: John Eliot Gardiner (father); Rolf Gardiner (grandfather)

Francesca Gardiner (born November 1983) is a British television writer.

Gardiner is best known as the showrunner of the upcoming HBO adaptation of Harry Potter. She has also written for His Dark Materials, The Rook and The Man in the High Castle. She was also credited as a consulting producer on Succession and a co-executive producer on Killing Eve.

== Early life ==
Gardiner was born in November 1983. She is the daughter of British conductor John Eliot Gardiner and violinist Elizabeth Wilcock.

Gardiner grew up on her family's 650-acre Farm in rural Dorset. She attended the Bryanston School.

She has two younger sisters, Josephine and Bryony.

Gardiner attended the London National Film and Television School.

== Career ==
Gardiner worked as a co-executive producer on Killing Eve. She was hired by Emerald Fennell during the show's second season to be a “writer’s friend” and act as a conduit between the writers and actors.

During the 3rd and 4th season of HBO's Succession, Gardiner was credited as a consulting producer on the series. She worked in the show's writers room.

Gardiner worked as an executive producer on the television adaptation of His Dark Materials. She joined the show as a writer during the second season. Gardiner wrote the final two episodes of the series.

In June 2024, Gardiner was hired as the showrunner and executive producer on the HBO adaptation of Harry Potter. Gardiner joined the project alongside Mark Mylod, who would also serve as executive producer and direct several episodes of the show. The pair had previously worked on Succession together. Gardiner's sister, Josephine, later joined the writers room for the show.

== Personal life ==
Gardiner has a daughter with her current partner.

== Filmography ==
=== TV series ===
Year	Title	Writer	Executive producer	Creator	Notes
2014	Transporter: The Series	Yes	No	No	2 episodes
2015	Crossing Lines	Yes	No	No	1 episode
2016	Medici	Yes	No	No	1 episode
2016	The Man in the High Castle	Yes	No	No	1 episode
2019	The Rook	Yes	No	No	2 episodes
2019	Killing Eve	No	Yes	No	co-executive producer (8 episodes)
2020–22	His Dark Materials	Yes	Yes	No	5 episodes
2021–23	Succession	Yes	No	No	Credited as consulting producer
2026–present	Harry Potter	Yes	Yes	No	Showrunner and executive producer
