= Arabella Stanton =

English actress (born 2014)

- Born: 11 April 2014 (age 12)
- Occupation: Actress
- Years active: 2023–present

Arabella Stanton (born 11 April 2014) is an English child actress. In May 2025, she was confirmed to be cast as Hermione Granger in HBO's upcoming Harry Potter television series.

== Biography ==
Stanton made her West End Debut where she played Matilda Wormwood in the West End production of Matilda the Musical from September 2023 until March 2024. She also played Control in the West End production of Andrew Lloyd Webber's musical Starlight Express from July to September 2024. In May 2025, she was cast as Hermione Granger in the upcoming Harry Potter television series (2026–), which will be broadcast on HBO; she will star alongside Dominic McLaughlin and Alastair Stout as Harry Potter and Ron Weasley respectively.

In August 2025, it was announced that Stanton would be voicing Hermione in Harry Potter: The Full-Cast Audio Editions, a production of Audible and J. K. Rowling's Pottermore. The project, which will adapt all seven novels into audiobooks, was announced in April 2024 and will include original music and over 100 voice actors. She is the only member of the trio to be playing their character in both the audiobook and television series, starring in the former alongside Frankie Treadaway as Harry Potter and Max Lester as Ron Weasley.

== Filmography ==
Key
†	Denotes television productions that have not yet been released

=== Television ===
Year	Title	Role	Notes
2026–present	Harry Potter †	Hermione Granger	Main role

=== Documentaries ===
Year	Title	Role	Notes
2026	Finding Harry: The Craft Behind the Magic	Herself	
2026	Behind The Mic: The Making of The Harry Potter Full-Cast Audio Editions	Herself	

=== Stage ===
Year	Title	Role	Notes
2023–2024	Matilda The Musical	Matilda Wormwood	West End
2024–2025	Starlight Express	Control	Wembley

=== Audiobook ===
Year	Title	Role	Notes	Ref.
2025	Harry Potter and the Philosopher’s Stone	Hermione Granger	Main role	
2025	Harry Potter and the Chamber of Secrets	Hermione Granger	Main role	
2026	Harry Potter and the Prisoner of Azkaban	Hermione Granger	Main role	
