= Harry Potter and the Goblet of Fire (film) =

2005 film by Mike Newell

- Theatrical release poster
- Directed by: Mike Newell
- Screenplay by: Steve Kloves
- Based on: Harry Potter and the Goblet of Fire by J. K. Rowling
- Produced by: David Heyman
- Starring: Daniel Radcliffe; Rupert Grint; Emma Watson; Robbie Coltrane; Ralph Fiennes; Michael Gambon; Brendan Gleeson; Jason Isaacs; Gary Oldman; Alan Rickman; Maggie Smith; Timothy Spall
- Cinematography: Roger Pratt
- Edited by: Mick Audsley
- Music by: Patrick Doyle
- Production companies: Warner Bros. Pictures; Heyday Films
- Distributed by: Warner Bros. Pictures
- Release dates: 6 November 2005 (Odeon Leicester Square); 18 November 2005 (United Kingdom and United States)
- Running time: 157 minutes
- Countries: United Kingdom; United States
- Language: English
- Budget: $150 million
- Box office: $900.4 million

Harry Potter and the Goblet of Fire is a 2005 fantasy film directed by Mike Newell from a screenplay by Steve Kloves. It is based on the 2000 novel Harry Potter and the Goblet of Fire by J. K. Rowling. It is the sequel to Harry Potter and the Prisoner of Azkaban (2004) and the fourth instalment in the Harry Potter film series. The film stars Daniel Radcliffe as Harry Potter, alongside Rupert Grint and Emma Watson as Harry's best friends Ron Weasley and Hermione Granger, respectively. The film follows Harry's fourth year at Hogwarts, as he is chosen by the Goblet of Fire to compete in the Triwizard Tournament.

Principal photography began in early 2004, and the film premiered worldwide on 18 November 2005. Five days following release, it had earned over US$102 million at the North American box office, the third-highest first-weekend tally for a Harry Potter film behind Harry Potter and the Deathly Hallows – Part 1 and Part 2. Goblet of Fire grossed $895 million worldwide in its initial release, becoming the highest-grossing film of 2005 and is the sixth highest-grossing film in the series.

The film was nominated for the Academy Award for Best Art Direction and won the BAFTA Award for Best Production Design. Goblet of Fire was the second film in the series to be released in IMAX. The film received positive reviews. It was followed by Harry Potter and the Order of the Phoenix in 2007.

== Plot ==
In 1994, Harry Potter has a nightmare in which a Muggle caretaker named Frank Bryce is murdered at the Riddle House after overhearing a plot by Lord Voldemort, Peter Pettigrew, and another man whom Harry does not recognise. The following morning, Harry attends the Quidditch World Cup with the Weasleys, Hermione Granger, Cedric Diggory and his father Amos. That night, Death Eaters attack the campsite after the tournament and the unknown man from Harry's nightmare casts the Dark Mark.

At Hogwarts, Professor Dumbledore announces that the school will host the Triwizard Tournament along with the Durmstrang Institute and the Beauxbatons Academy. One student from each school will be chosen by the Goblet of Fire to participate; students under the age of seventeen are ineligible. The Goblet selects Fleur Delacour for Beauxbatons, Viktor Krum for Durmstrang, and Cedric for Hogwarts. It then chooses Harry as a fourth Champion, leading to much confusion. Many students believe Harry cheated, and Ron distances himself from him, hurt that Harry did not tell him when he allegedly entered. Harry is forced to compete due to a magical binding contract when a Champion's name was selected.

For the first task, the Champions must retrieve an egg by getting past a dragon. Professor Alastor Moody, the new Defence Against the Dark Arts teacher, hints that Harry can use his wand to summon his broomstick. All four Champions collect their eggs. Ron reconciles with Harry after witnessing how perilous the first task was. On Christmas Eve, the school hosts the Yule Ball, but Harry and Ron could not attend with their preferred dates and instead go with Parvati and Padma Patil, respectively; Hermione goes with Viktor, provoking Ron's jealousy. Cedric advises Harry to use the Prefects' bathroom on the fifth floor of Hogwarts, take a bath, and submerge the egg in the water to find the second clue.

For the second task, the Champions must rescue somebody of value to them from the Black Lake: Harry has to save Ron, Cedric has to save his girlfriend, Cho Chang, Viktor has to rescue Hermione, and Fleur has to save her sister, Gabrielle. Neville Longbottom gives Harry gillyweed to help him breathe underwater. Cedric comes in first, and Harry is awarded second place after he saves not only Ron, but also Gabrielle, after Fleur had withdrawn from the task.

Harry later finds the lifeless body of Bartemius Crouch, a Ministry of Magic official, in the Forbidden Forest. In Dumbledore's office, he enters a Pensieve. He witnesses the questioning of Igor Karkaroff, current headmaster of Durmstrang, by Bartemius Crouch. Karkaroff is asked to name those who served Voldemort. He names Severus Snape, but Dumbledore vouches for Snape. Karkaroff then names Barty Crouch Jr. Harry recognises Barty Jr. from his nightmare.

For the third task, the Champions must navigate a maze to reach the Triwizard Cup. Harry and Cedric reach the Cup only to discover it is a Portkey that transports them to the graveyard from Harry's dream. Pettigrew kills Cedric on Voldemort's orders. He then uses Harry's blood to fully restore Voldemort. Lucius Malfoy and the Death Eaters arrive and are punished by Voldemort, while Pettigrew is rewarded. Voldemort tortures Harry and attempts to use the Killing Curse on him but as it clashes with Harry's spell, the ghosts of Voldemort's previous victims: Cedric, Frank, and Harry's parents Lily and James appear, distracting Voldemort long enough for Harry to use the Cup to return to Hogwarts with Cedric's body.

Harry informs Dumbledore of Cedric's murder and Voldemort's return. Harry is escorted by Moody to his office where he learns that Moody put his name into the Goblet and was guiding him to ensure the return of Voldemort. Just as Moody is about to kill Harry, Dumbledore, Snape, and Minerva McGonagall subdue Moody. Using Veritaserum, they learn that they have caught Barty Crouch Jr., who was impersonating Moody using Polyjuice Potion; the real Moody is imprisoned in a magical trunk.

At a memorial ceremony, Dumbledore announces that Voldemort murdered Cedric, although the Ministry denies these claims. Harry informs Dumbledore of his encounter with Voldemort, which Dumbledore describes as Priori Incantatem. The three schools bid farewell, with Harry, Ron, and Hermione agreeing that everything will change.

== Cast ==
- Daniel Radcliffe as Harry Potter: A 14-year-old British wizard famous for surviving his parents' murder at the hands of the evil dark wizard Lord Voldemort as an infant, who now enters his fourth year at Hogwarts School of Witchcraft and Wizardry.
- Rupert Grint as Ron Weasley: Harry's best friend at Hogwarts and a younger member of the Weasley wizarding family.
- Emma Watson as Hermione Granger: Harry's other best friend and the trio's brains.
- Robbie Coltrane as Rubeus Hagrid: The gamekeeper and Care of Magical Creatures teacher at Hogwarts.
- Ralph Fiennes as Lord Voldemort:
  A dark wizard intent on conquering the Wizarding World and the leader of the Death Eaters. Despite being aware of the success of the Harry Potter books and films, Fiennes hadn't originally read or seen them, so he wasn't interested at first when approached to play Voldemort, but after telling his sister Martha, she convinced him to take the role. Fiennes commented on the difficulty of playing someone who is "the essence of evil," and discussed giving a humanity to Voldemort in order for him to be "deeply, truly evil", citing the character's unhappy childhood as fuel for "anger, jealousy and hatred". He and director Mike Newell were interested in exploring the character's "unexpected mood swings". Newell cited Fiennes' ability to play "a realistic and frightening villain" instead of "a simple caricature" as a reason for his casting.
- Michael Gambon as Albus Dumbledore:
  The headmaster of Hogwarts and one of the greatest wizards of all time. Gambon commented on the state of the character in the film: "Dumbledore is no longer in control and he's frightened." Newell compared Gambon's performance with Richard Harris' iteration in earlier films, showing the character as "fallible and not omnipotent" and "inadequate rather than super-adequate."
- Brendan Gleeson as Alastor "Mad-Eye" Moody:
  A famous ex-Auror appointed by Dumbledore as the new Defence Against the Dark Arts teacher at Hogwarts. Gleeson referred to Moody as "a gunslinger with a wand," whose "great wounds have damaged him greatly." Heyman found Gleeson brought "a great balance of ferociousness and humour" to what he called a "complex, challenging character."
- Jason Isaacs as Lucius Malfoy: Draco's father and a former Hogwarts pupil of Slytherin House. He is also a member of the Death Eaters. Isaacs didn't initially expect to be back in the fourth Harry Potter film, but felt nonetheless grateful to be able to "get the wig out of mothballs" while preparing for the next film, where he was slated to have a bigger role.
- Gary Oldman as Sirius Black: Harry's godfather, who had escaped from Azkaban after being wrongly imprisoned for twelve years and is now a fugitive.
- Alan Rickman as Severus Snape: The Potions teacher at Hogwarts and head of Slytherin.
- Maggie Smith as Minerva McGonagall: Deputy Headmistress of Hogwarts, the Transfiguration teacher at Hogwarts and head of Gryffindor.
- Timothy Spall as Peter Pettigrew: The Death Eater who betrayed Harry's parents to Voldemort.
- Bonnie Wright as Ginny Weasley

Several actors from the previous films reprise their roles in Goblet of Fire. James and Oliver Phelps play Fred and George Weasley, Ron's older twin brothers, while Mark Williams plays their father, Arthur Weasley. Tom Felton portrays Lucius Malfoy's son Draco, Harry's rival in Slytherin, while Jamie Waylett and Josh Herdman appear as Crabbe and Goyle, Draco's minions. Matthew Lewis, Devon Murray and Alfred Enoch play Neville Longbottom, Seamus Finnigan and Dean Thomas respectively, three Gryffindor students in Harry's year. David Bradley appears as Argus Filch, Hogwarts' caretaker, and Warwick Davis returns as Professor Filius Flitwick, now using the look used when Davis portrayed the conductor of the Hogwarts Choir in the previous film. Shirley Henderson reprises her role as Moaning Myrtle, a Hogwarts ghost, and Robert Hardy returns as Cornelius Fudge, the Minister for Magic. Louis Doyle appears as Ernie MacMillan and Charlotte Skeoch as Hannah Abbott; Hufflepuff students.

Robert Pattinson appears as Cedric Diggory; a Hufflepuff student who is a Hogwarts champion, Pattinson replaces Joe Livermore, who made a brief appearance in the previous film during a Quidditch sequence. Jeff Rawle appears as Cedric's father Amos. David Tennant plays Barty Crouch Jr., a Death Eater, and Roger Lloyd-Pack portrays his father Bartemius Crouch, head of the Department of International Magical Cooperation. Katie Leung appears as Cho Chang, a Ravenclaw student and Harry's love interest. Clémence Poésy plays Beauxbatons champion Fleur Delacour, while Stanislav Ianevski portrays Durmstrang champion and Quidditch star Viktor Krum. Miranda Richardson plays The Daily Prophet reporter Rita Skeeter. Predrag Bjelac appears as Igor Karkaroff, Headmaster of Durmstrang and a former Death Eater, while Frances de la Tour plays Olympe Maxime, Headmistress of Beauxbatons. Shefali Chowdhury and Afshan Azad play Parvati and Padma Patil, Harry and Ron's dates to the Yule Ball, respectively. Eric Sykes appears as Frank Bryce, the caretaker at the Riddle family house. John Hurt originally confirmed in an interview with Empire that he would reprise his role as Garrick Ollivander as part of his four-film contract, but his scenes were cut.

== Production ==
=== Development ===
Chris Columbus, who directed Harry Potter and the Philosopher's Stone (2001) and Harry Potter and the Chamber of Secrets (2002), originally thought about returning to direct the film adaptation of Harry Potter and the Goblet of Fire while producing Harry Potter and the Prisoner of Azkaban (2004), but ultimately declined because his children wanted to spend time with him like a family. In addition, they wanted to move back to America to see their friends after moving to England for the first two films.

Having read the first three books, Columbus had noticed the progressively darker tone of the story, leading author J. K. Rowling to give him, producer David Heyman and screenwriter Steve Kloves copies of a huge manuscript about her plans for Goblet of Fire before it was published, just so they could prepare themselves in terms of filming each subsequent film. M. Night Shyamalan was approached to direct the film but he was more interested in directing the film adaptation of Life of Pi. British film director Mike Newell was chosen to direct the film after Prisoner of Azkaban director Alfonso Cuarón announced that he would only be able to direct one Harry Potter film. In a statement explaining the transition of directors, series producer Heyman said:

When Alfonso made the decision to focus on completing Harry Potter and the Prisoner of Azkaban, we were faced with the daunting task of finding a director to handle the complex challenges of Harry Potter and the Goblet of Fire and to follow in the footsteps of Chris Columbus and Alfonso Cuarón. Mike's rich and diverse body of work show him to be the perfect choice. He has worked with children, made us laugh, and had us sitting on the edge of our seats. He is great with actors and imbues all his characters, all his films, with great humanity. I'm thrilled.

Work on the script began in April 2003. Heyman considered the pre-production on Goblet of Fire had been too lengthy for a single film. He stated, "We're going to shoot it as one and see how it ends up. If it's too long then we'll make it into two." Kloves, writer for the previous instalments, returned for Goblet of Fire. On adapting the 636-page book into a single feature-length film, Kloves commented, "we always thought it would be two movies, but we could never figure out a way to break it in two. So it will be a different experience from the book."

Columbus advised Heyman of splitting Goblet of Fire into two separate films due to its length, but Warner Bros. Pictures showed no interest in the idea. Newell found that "there was a way of making one film, which was as a thriller," while "[staying] true to the book and [keeping] the length down." In order to prepare for the film, Newell watched "paranoid thrillers" such as North by Northwest (1959), The Parallax View (1974), and Three Days of the Condor (1975). Henry Cavill auditioned for Cedric Diggory before Pattinson was cast; and Tolga Safer, who appeared as Karkaroff's Aide, auditioned for Viktor Krum before Ianevski was cast. Rosamund Pike was considered for Rita Skeeter, but she turned down the role because it was minor, a decision she would later regret.

=== Costume and set design ===
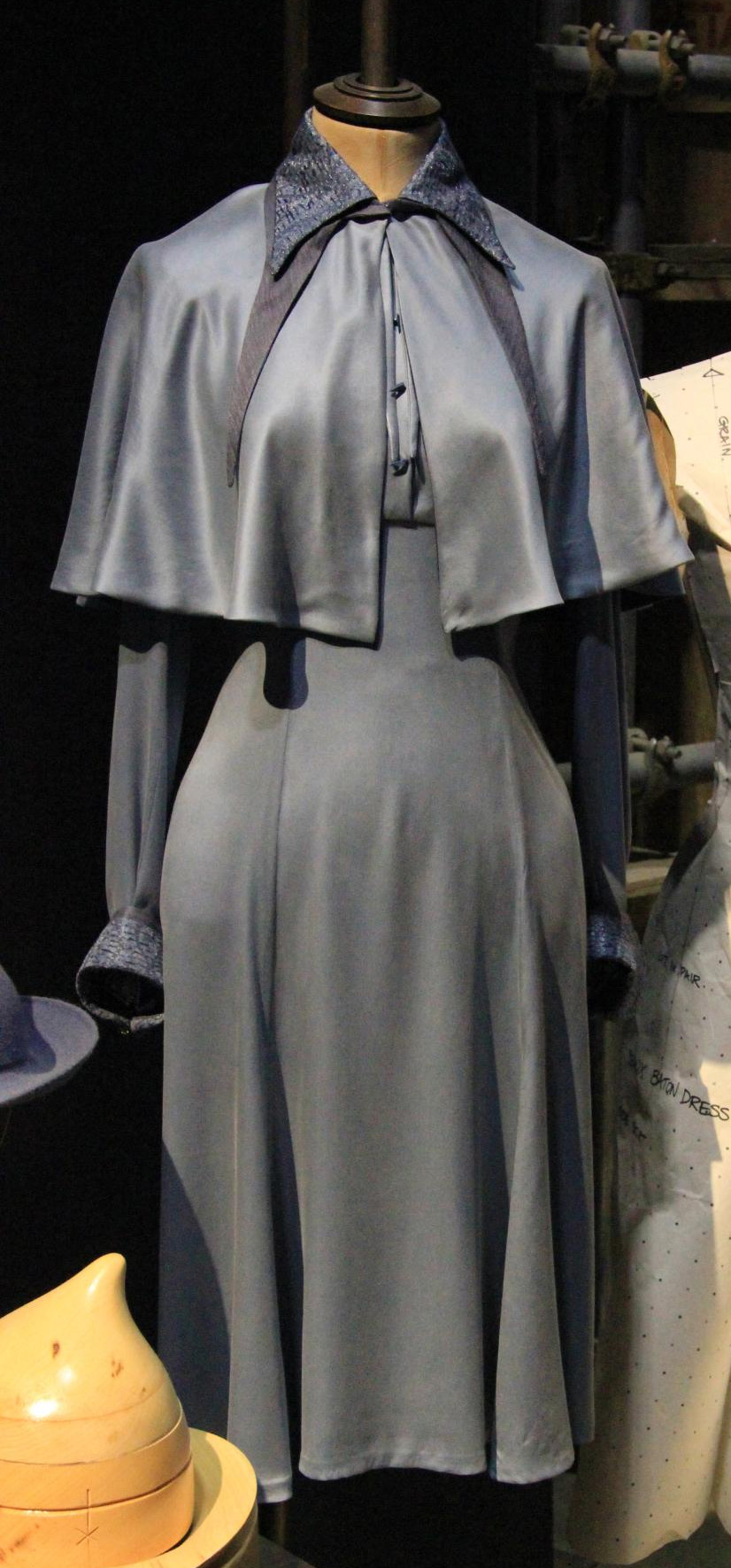
Beauxbatons dress

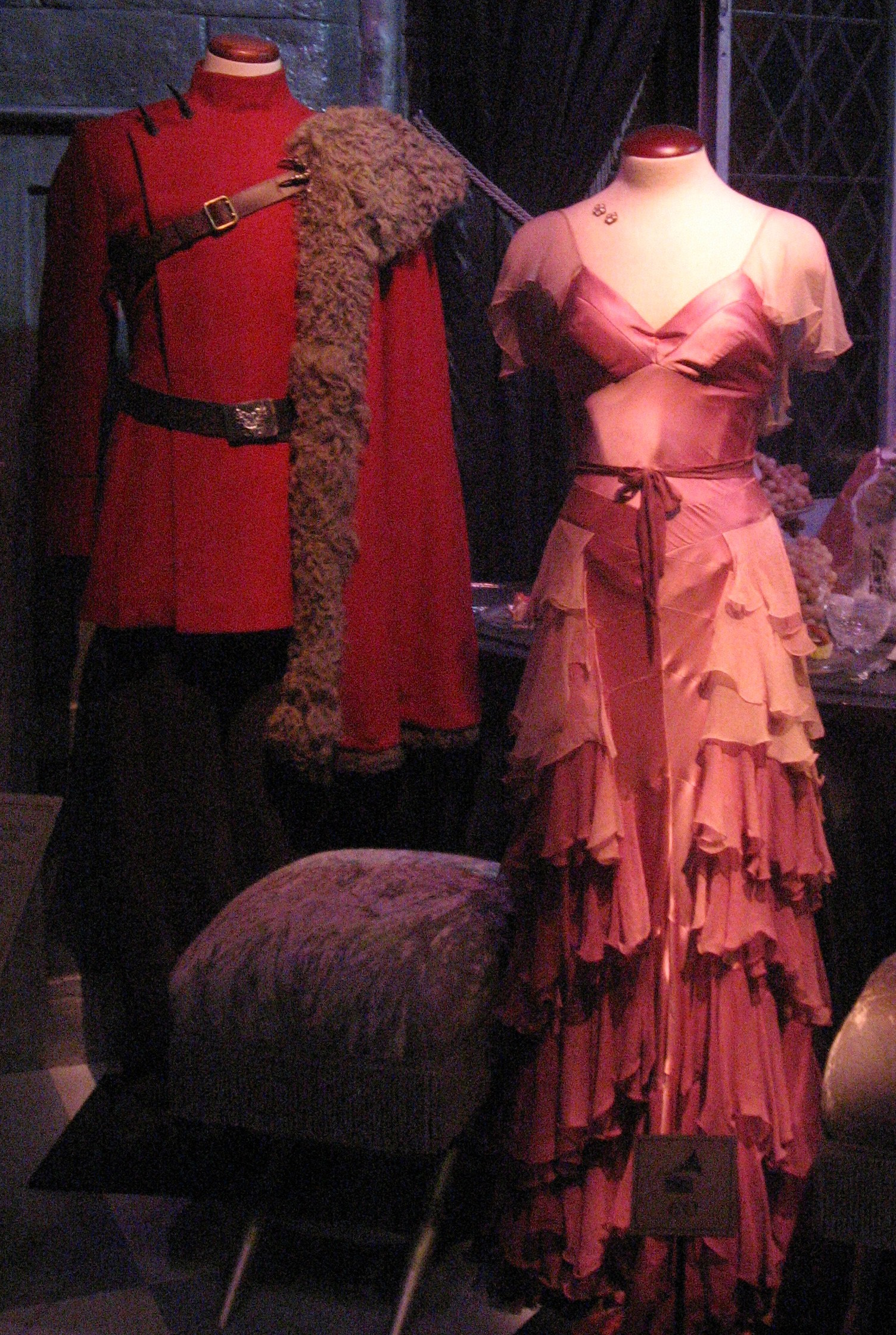
Yule Ball costumes for Viktor Krum and Hermione

Costume designer Jany Temime returned as costume designer for Goblet of Fire. Temime made the Beauxbatons uniforms out of French blue silk, which stood out from the muted colours of the other schools. The fabric of the uniforms "clings to their form, in complete contrast to the restrictive uniforms the Hogwarts girls wear." The hat was designed by milliner Philip Treacy. The Durmstrang uniform was made of thick wool, with crimson robes and fur hats and capes. Temime drew inspiration from Habsburg and Russian folklore. For the Yule Ball, Temime created more than 300 costumes. Hermione's dress, which took three months to make, was designed to be a "fairy-tale dress", balancing "sweetness and allure" and keeping it "very prudish", in order for it to be "slightly sexy" while still appropriate for a teenager. Moody's coat was inspired by spaghetti Westerns, with a team spending a week "aging and distressing the coat to give it a lifetime's worth of wear."

As in the previous instalments, Stuart Craig and Stephenie McMillan served as production designer and set decorator, respectively. Due to the film's scope, there were many new sets and transformations of old sets created. McMillan was most excited about redesigning the Great Hall for the scenes involving the Yule Ball. As the novel described it as an ice palace, they decided to make "the magic ceiling out of ice", covering the walls in reflective silver and giving "an icy or silver makeover" to the decorations. McMillan and fellow set decorator Lee Sandales also created "magical ice sculptures, iced drinks and frosted food".

Each task of the Triwizard Tournament required massive sets. The rock quarry set for the first task, where Harry faces off with the Hungarian Horntail, was built in two sections at Leavesden Studios. Craig called it "one of the biggest sets we've ever built for any of the films." For the second task, involving the film's underwater scenes, the film crew designed and built a blue screen tank measuring 20 feet (6 m) deep by 60 feet (18 m) square, holding "about half a million gallons of water." It is the largest underwater filming tank in Europe. As for the final task, which took place in the maze, hedge walls ranging from 20 to 40 feet (6–12 m) tall were constructed and enhanced with computer-generated imagery.

=== Filming ===
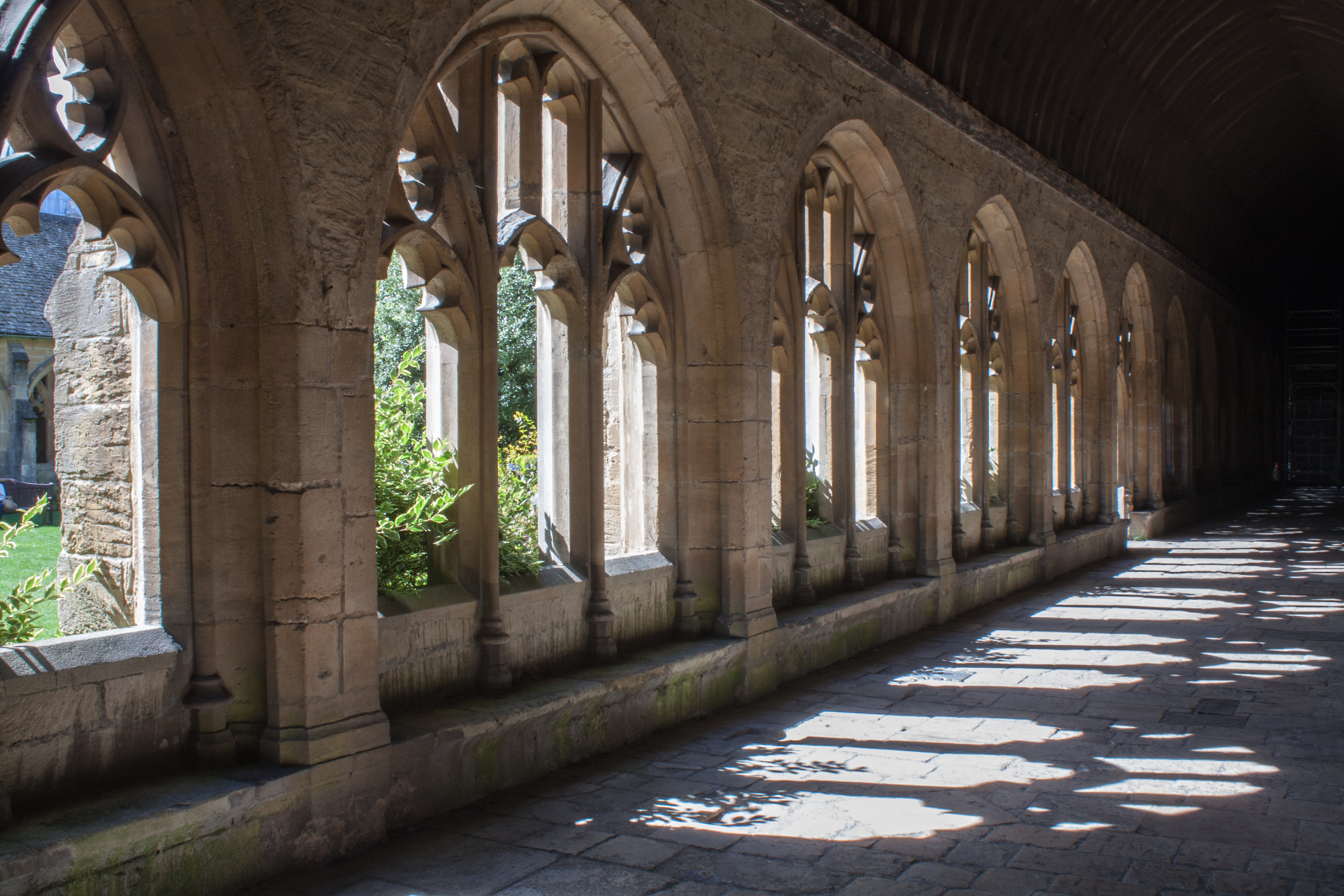
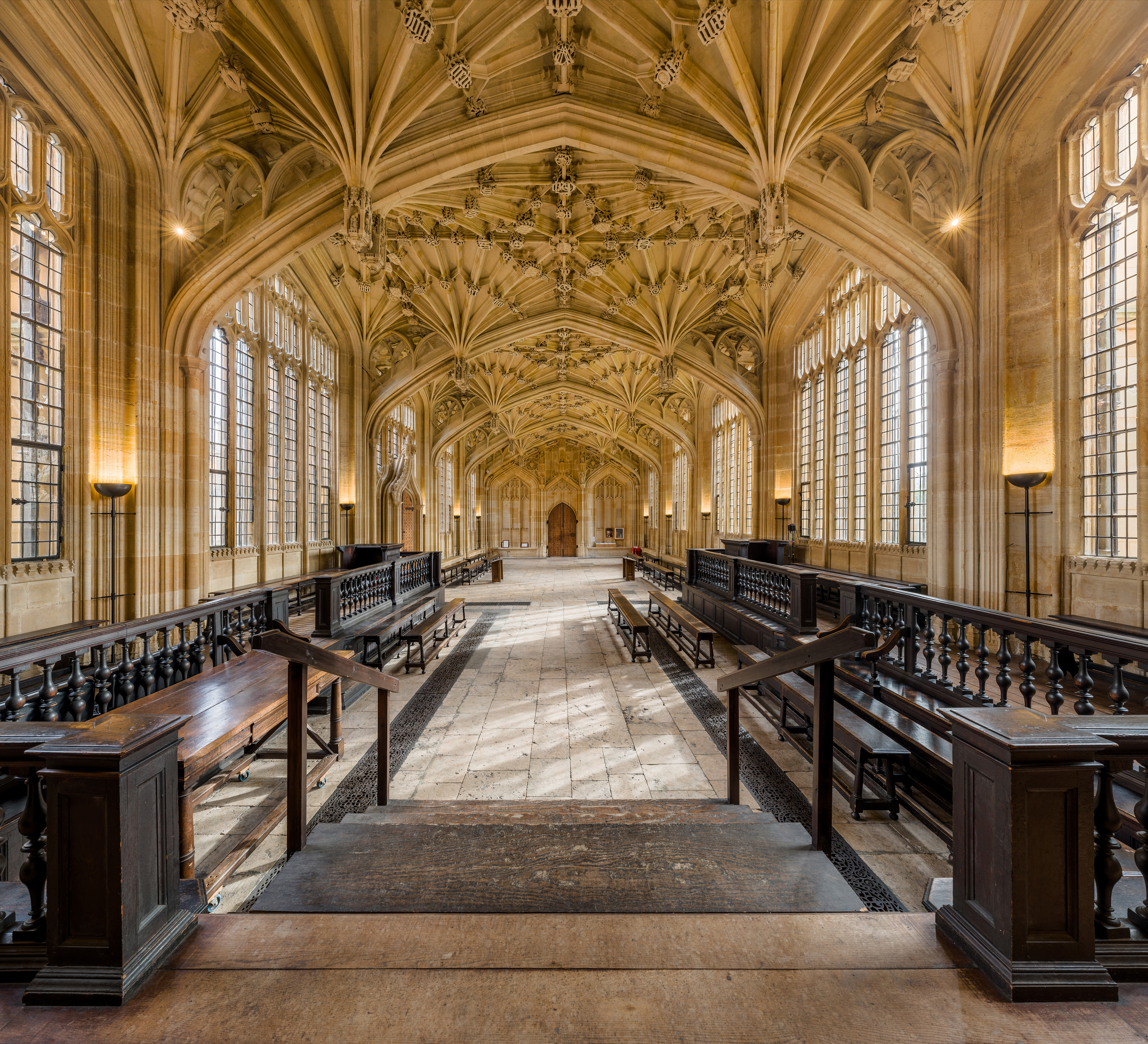
New College and Divinity School at Oxford University served as parts of Hogwarts for Goblet of Fire.

Principal photography officially began on 4 May 2004, although shooting with the main cast did not start until 25 June 2004 at Leavesden Studios in England, and wrapped in March 2005.

The local area surrounding Leavesden Studios was used for the site of the Quidditch World Cup, filmed in Ivinghoe Beacon, and Ashridge Wood, while the cliff where the characters land with the Portkey was located in Seven Sisters Country Park in Seaford, East Sussex. Kirby wires were used to suspend the actors in the air during the landing scene.

Parts of Hogwarts were filmed at Oxford University. Harry's confrontation with Malfoy, who is later turned into a ferret by Moody, was shot in the courtyard quadrangle of the New College Cloister. Divinity School served as the room where McGonagall teaches Gryffindor students how to dance for the Yule Ball, having also been used as Hogwarts' infirmary in previous films. The Yule Ball scene was filmed in December 2004. Scenes by Hogwarts' Lake were filmed at the Virginia Water Lake in Surrey.

The forest where Hagrid shows Harry the dragons was set in Black Park, next to Pinewood Studios, while the first task of the Triwizard Tournament was filmed at the Steall Falls in Glen Nevis and Black Rock Gorge. For the second task, set in the Black Lake, the filmmakers tried a technique called dry for wet, where actors are suspended and wind is blown on them to simulate being underwater, but found "the hair didn't undulate convincingly." The sequence was then filmed in a large underwater tank, and the actors took scuba diving lessons in preparation, under the supervision of stunt coordinator Greg Powell. Radcliffe underwent six months of training for the scene and spent more than 40 hours underwater over the three weeks it took to film.

=== Music ===
John Williams, who had scored the first three Harry Potter films, could not return for the fourth installment due to a busy schedule. Williams had already committed to composing Revenge of the Sith, Munich, War of the Worlds, and Memoirs of a Geisha all in 2005. Patrick Doyle, who had worked with Newell on Into the West and Donnie Brasco, replaced him as composer. The initial request was that Doyle would be working with Williams' material, but eventually only "Hedwig's Theme", the leitmotif of the series, remained from the previous scores. Pulp lead singer Jarvis Cocker, who was even reported to score the film, was one of the musicians invited by Doyle, with whom he had worked in the Great Expectations soundtrack, to write a song for a wizard rock band. Once Doyle chose Cocker's composition, he and other British musicians such as Jonny Greenwood and Philip Selway of Radiohead were picked to play the fictional band Weird Sisters, both performing songs for the soundtrack and having cameo roles in the film.

== Differences from the book ==
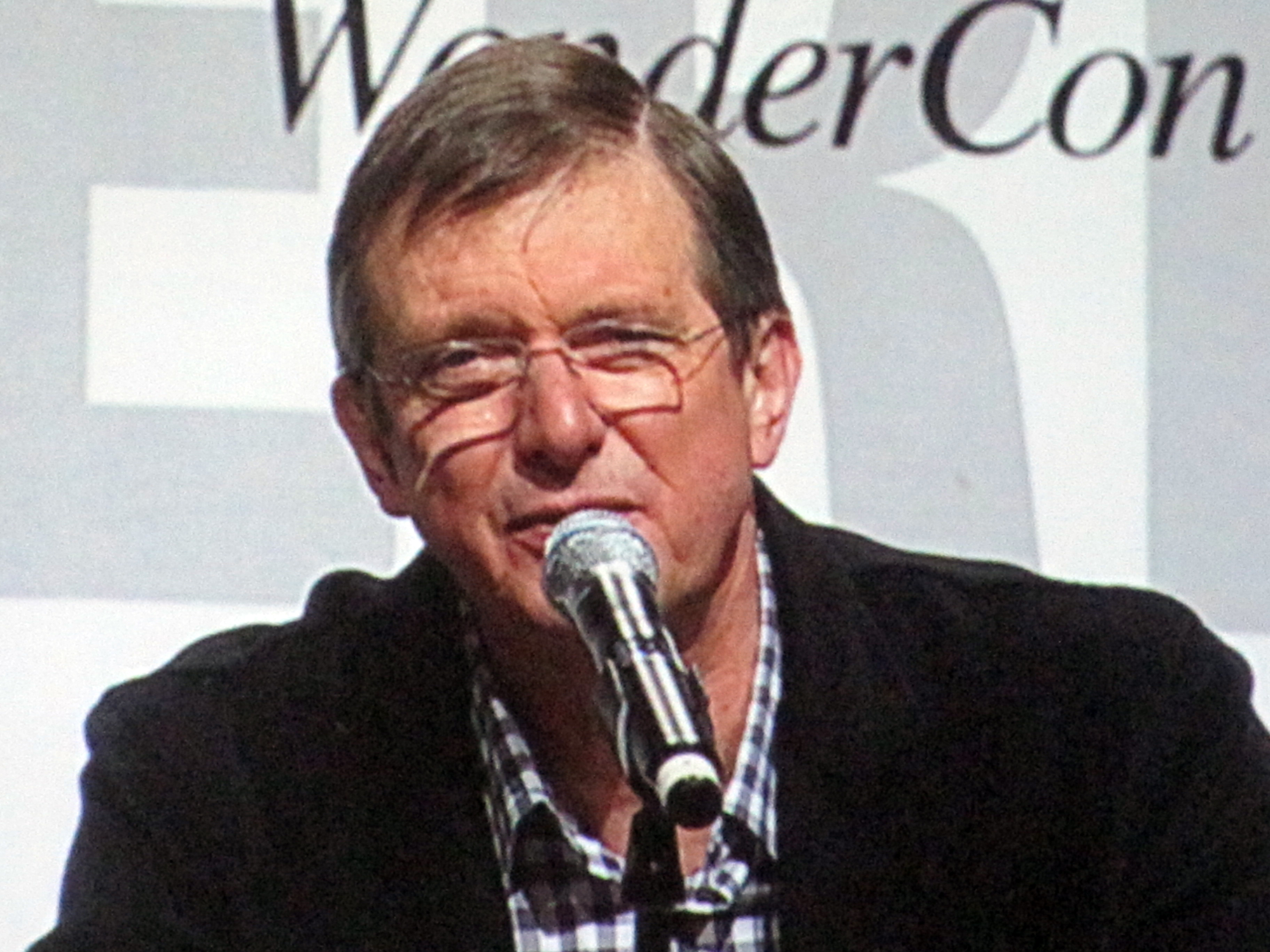
Director Mike Newell described the book as "big as a house brick".

With the Goblet of Fire novel almost twice the length of Prisoner of Azkaban, the writers and producers reduced certain scenes and concepts to make the transition from page to screen. Director Mike Newell described the problem as one of "compressing a huge book into the compass of a movie". This was achieved by "putting aside" all the components of the novel which did not directly relate to Harry and his journey.

Goblet of Fire is the first film adaptation not to begin at Privet Drive; after the opening sequence, Harry awakens at the Burrow on the morning of the Quidditch World Cup final. The gameplay at the Quidditch World Cup final was removed for timing reasons, leaving an abrupt temporal jump that some reviewers considered awkward or "rushed". In the book, Harry and many of the Weasleys support Ireland, while in the film Harry and Ron support Bulgaria. Nonetheless, both of them admire the Bulgarian seeker Viktor Krum.

The scene where Dumbledore asks Harry if he put his name in the goblet is noticeably different. In the book, he asks calmly whereas in the film, he appears much angrier and panic stricken, to the point that he even manhandles Harry and demands an answer from him. Similarly, Harry's first trial with a dragon is expanded into an extended flight around Hogwarts.

Other scenes are shortened and amalgamated to include only the most essential plot details. For example, the three Death Eater trials Harry witnesses in the Pensieve are merged into one sequence. The characters of Bill Weasley, Charlie Weasley, Cassius Warrington, Ludo Bagman, Winky, Narcissa Malfoy, and Bertha Jorkins are all absent, as well as Dobby, who was supposed to help Harry obtain gillyweed for the second task. In place of Dobby, this scene was changed to involve Neville Longbottom. All of Sirius Black's lines are condensed into a single fireside conversation.

The house elves/slavery subplot, which involves Hermione's attempt to form a group (S.P.E.W.) to promote their welfare is omitted. The scene where Harry hears Karkaroff arguing with Snape at the Yule Ball is cut from the film, but can be seen on the DVD extras. Harry is never seen either receiving or giving away the 1,000 galleons in prize winnings. The scene in which Crouch Jr. is taken back to Azkaban is different from the book, in which he was "kissed" by a Dementor summoned by Cornelius Fudge. There is also no conversation in which Fudge refuses to believe that Voldemort has returned, leaving this to be explained in the next film. There is no train scene at the end where Rita Skeeter is revealed to be an illegal, unregistered Animagus or that Hermione uses this information to blackmail her into silence for a year.

== Distribution ==
=== Marketing ===
An exclusive first-look was shown on ABC during the television premiere of Harry Potter and the Chamber of Secrets on 7 May 2005. The first trailer was made available online on 8 May 2005. The international trailer debuted online on 23 August 2005.

The video game adaptation, designed by EA UK, was released 8 November 2005. Mattel released a line of action figures and artefacts based on the film. Among these was the first edition of Harry Potter Scene It? containing over 1,000 questions involving the four films.

=== Theatrical release ===
Goblet of Fire was the first instalment in the series to be rated 12A by the BBFC for its dark themes, fantasy violence, threat and frightening images. In the US, it received a PG-13 rating from the MPAA for "sequences of fantasy violence and frightening images". In Australia, the ACB classified it as M (Mature) for "moderate dark themes, moderate fantasy violence".

Goblet of Fire was the second film in the series to be given a simultaneous release in conventional theatres and IMAX. Dubbed Harry Potter and the Goblet of Fire: The IMAX Experience, it was digitally remastered for IMAX from its 35mm form to take part in a "commercial growth strategy" set up between IMAX and Warner Bros.

The film was released in most countries within a two-week period starting on 18 November 2005 in the United Kingdom and United States, with a 1 December 2005 release in Australia. In the United States, the film opened in a maximum of 3,858 cinemas that included several IMAX venues.

The world premiere took place in London, England on 6 November 2005. One of the features of the premiere was an animatronic, fire-breathing Hungarian Horntail. The 40-foot-long dragon, used during the scene where Hagrid leads Harry into the forest at night before the first task, was designed and built by special effects supervisor John Richardson and creature effects/makeup supervisor Nick Dudman.

=== Home media ===
The film was released on DVD in North America on 7 March 2006. It was available in one- and two-disc editions, as well as part of an 8-disc box set that includes all four films at that time. The bonus disc features three interactive games, as well as seven behind the scenes featurettes. It was also released in UMD format for PSP.

A VHS release occurred at least in New Zealand, Finland and Japan, with the fullscreen aspect ratio.

On its first day of release in North America, over 5 million copies were sold, recording a franchise high for first-day sales. Within its first week, it sold over a total of 9 million units of combined sales of both the widescreen and full-screen versions of the DVD. Overall, The Goblet of Fire made a revenue of $207.9 million from home video sales in the US.

The UK edition was released on DVD on 20 March 2006 and became the fastest selling UK DVD ever, selling six copies per second on its day of release. According to the Official Charts Company, the DVD sold 1.4 million copies in the first week. It is also available in a two-disc pressing with special features similar to the North American edition.

The film holds the Guinness World Record for being the fastest selling DVD of all time. The achievement was added to the 2007 book edition of The Guinness World Records, which includes a picture of the award being presented to Daniel Radcliffe on the Order of the Phoenix set at Leavesden Film Studios in April 2006.

In the United States, the first five films were released on HD DVD and Blu-ray disc on 11 December 2007. Goblet of Fire has since become available in numerous box sets containing the other released films, including the Harry Potter: Complete 8-Film Collection and Harry Potter Wizard's Collection. An Ultimate Edition of Goblet of Fire was released on 19 October 2010, featuring behind-the-scenes footage, trailers, deleted scenes and a feature-length special Creating the World of Harry Potter Part 4: Sound & Music. Despite not being included in the Ultimate Edition, an extended version has been shown during certain television airings with roughly ten minutes of additional footage.

== Reception ==
=== Box office ===
After an opening day of $40 million at the North American box office and staying at number 1 for three weeks, Goblet of Fire made a successful 20-week run in cinemas, closing on 6 April 2006. The film set numerous records, including the highest non-May opening weekend in the US, and earned £14.9m in its opening weekend in the UK, a record which has since been beaten by the 2008 James Bond film Quantum of Solace, which took in £15.4m. The Goblet of Fire drew $102.7 million for its opening weekend at the North American box office, setting a new opening high for the franchise and also achieved the highest weekend debut in November, with the latter being surpassed by The Twilight Saga: New Moon in 2009. The film also achieved the biggest opening weekend for a Warner Bros. Pictures film, holding this record for three years until the release of The Dark Knight in July 2008. It sold about as many tickets as Harry Potter and the Philosopher's Stone did in its opening weekend. The film's franchise record was later overtaken in 2010 by Harry Potter and the Deathly Hallows – Part 1, which opened to $125 million; Harry Potter and the Deathly Hallows – Part 2 followed with $169.1 million in its opening weekend. The Goblet of Fire's debut marked the fourth $100 million weekend in history and as of July 2011, it stands as the 17th largest opening weekend ever. In Mainland China, the film generated 93 million yuan.

The Goblet of Fire earned almost US$897 million worldwide, making it the highest-grossing international and worldwide release of 2005.

In IMAX theatres only, the film grossed a total of US$20,033,758 worldwide for a cumulative per-screen average of $188,998 thus setting a new record and a new milestone for a digitally remastered 2-D IMAX release.

In January 2006, The Goblet of Fire surpassed the box office takings of Harry Potter and the Chamber of Secrets (2002) to become the eighth-highest-grossing film worldwide, and the second-highest-grossing film in the Harry Potter series, behind The Philosopher's Stone. As of July 2011, it has been the sixth-highest-grossing Harry Potter film behind The Philosopher's Stone, The Order of the Phoenix and The Half-Blood Prince, The Deathly Hallows – Part 1, and The Deathly Hallows – Part 2.

The film ranks third in the North American box office behind Star Wars: Episode III – Revenge of the Sith and The Chronicles of Narnia: The Lion, the Witch and the Wardrobe for 2005, with US$290 million, although both films rank lower than Harry Potter and the Goblet of Fire in worldwide terms.

=== Critical response ===
On Rotten Tomatoes the film holds an approval rating of 88% based on 259 reviews, with an average rating of 7.4/10. The site's critical consensus reads, "The main characters are maturing, and the filmmakers are likewise improving on their craft; vibrant special effects and assured performances add up to what is the most complex yet of the Harry Potter films." On Metacritic, the film has a weighted average score of 81 out of 100, based on 38 critics, indicating "universal acclaim". Audiences surveyed by CinemaScore gave the film an average grade of "A" on an A+ to F scale.

The New York Daily News praised the film for both its humour and its dark tone. The young actors were praised for demonstrating a "greater range of subtle emotions", particularly Daniel Radcliffe whom Variety described as delivering a "dimensional and nuanced performance".

Robert Pattinson received critical praise for his scenes as Cedric Diggory, where he "invested him with a charm and everyman likeability, making his demise at the hands of the newly made-flesh Voldemort a devastatingly poignant turning point in the series." New cast members were also praised: Brendan Gleeson's portrayal of "Mad-Eye" Moody was described as "colourful"; Miranda Richardson's scenes as Rita Skeeter were described as "wonderful"; and Ralph Fiennes's portrayal of Lord Voldemort was described as "sublime villainy".

The maturity of Harry, Ron, and Hermione, among others, impressed most critics. While the major characters were portrayed as children in the previous films, "they have subtly transitioned into teenagers (in Goblet of Fire)" according to one USA Today reviewer. Desson Thomson of The Washington Post called the film "Probably the most engaging film of the Potter series thus far". Joe Morgenstern of The Wall Street Journal stated "The studio, like plucky Harry, passes with flying colors. The new one, directed by Mike Newell from another astute script by Mr. Kloves, is even richer and fuller, as well as dramatically darker. It's downright scary how good this movie is".

Negative criticism included the film's pace which The Arizona Republic described as being "far too episodic", while CNN.com described the film as "clunky and disjointed". Another criticism was that the many supporting characters did not get enough screen time. The film was listed at #36 on Entertainment Weekly's list of the 50 Best High School Movies praising Rowling for ingeniously blending "two literary traditions, fantasy and coming-through-school fiction".

=== Accolades ===
The film was nominated for the Academy Award for Best Art Direction at the 78th Academy Awards. At the 2006 Teen Choice Awards, the film won the award for Choice Movie Drama. The film won the BAFTA Award for Best Production Design, making it the first Harry Potter film to win at the BAFTAs. It also won 2006 BAFTA Kids' Vote at British Academy Children's Awards.

At the 2006 Kids' Choice Awards, the film won the Blimp Award for Favorite Movie, becoming the only Harry Potter film to do so.

== Lawsuit ==
In the run up to the film's release, Warner Bros. approached a Canadian folk group called the Wyrd Sisters to obtain permission to use the name The Weird Sisters for its Harry Potter band. When a deal could not be made, the Canadian band filed a US$40 million lawsuit against Warner Bros., the film's distributor, as well as the members of the in-movie band (members of Radiohead and Pulp, among others) for the misuse of their group's name. (In a deleted scene, they are simply introduced as "the band that needs no introduction".) The Canadian band also brought an injunction to stop the release of the film in its country, as it contained a performance by the identically named fictional rock band.

An Ontario judge dismissed this motion, and to avoid further controversy, Warner Bros. rendered the band unnamed in the film and many derived products. However, the Winnipeg-based group continued to pursue the lawsuit; lead singer Kim Baryluk stated in her claim that "consumers will assume that the smaller and less famous Canadian band is trying to take advantage of the Harry Potter fame by copying the Harry Potter band's name when in fact the reverse is true." The injunction was dismissed, and the band was ordered to pay costs. As of March 2010, the lawsuit has been settled, and the details sealed.

== See also ==
- List of films about witchcraft
