= Harry Potter and the Goblet of Fire (video game) =

2005 video game

- Cover art
- Developers: EA UK; Magic Pockets (Game Boy Advance, Nintendo DS)
- Publisher: Electronic Arts
- Composers: Jeremy Soule; Julian Soule
- Series: Wizarding World
- Platforms: Game Boy Advance; Nintendo DS; Microsoft Windows; PlayStation 2; Xbox; GameCube; PlayStation Portable
- Release: Game Boy Advance, Nintendo DS, Microsoft Windows, PlayStation 2, Xbox, GameCube, NA: 8 November 2005; EU: 11 November 2005; PlayStation Portable: NA: 15 November 2005; EU: 18 November 2005
- Genre: Action-adventure
- Modes: Single-player, multiplayer

Harry Potter and the Goblet of Fire is a 2005 action-adventure game published by Electronic Arts. It is based on the 2005 film of the same name.

The game was released for Game Boy Advance, GameCube, Microsoft Windows, Nintendo DS, PlayStation 2, Xbox, and PlayStation Portable. It received mixed reviews from critics, with reviewers enjoying the scope of the spells and gameplay, but being less impressed by the short length, and the lack of free roaming components found in previous installments.

== Gameplay ==
The game follows the events and characters of the novel and film, with the player controlling Harry Potter (voiced by Daniel Larner), Hermione Granger (Harper Marshall) and Ron Weasley (Gregg Chillin). The game uses an improved version of the group casting mechanic found in Harry Potter and the Prisoner of Azkaban. Improved graphics mean the characters themselves more closely resemble their film counterparts than in previous games. Gameplay in the Goblet of Fire is much more action-orientated, which is a change from the puzzle and adventure elements found in previous games of the series.

The game is split up into particular levels, rather than free-roaming around Hogwarts castle like in earlier games. Levels are played from parts of the novel the game is based on, with levels ranging from the Quidditch World cup, the Prefect's bathroom, and the Herbology greenhouses; which can be entered from the in-game "pensieve". The game also features modes outside of combat, including broomstick flying, and underwater swimming.

In a first for the series, players can play the game with friends, and can combine their magic and spells to make them more powerful. Players can also capture moving beans using Accio and increase their power with collectors, creature, and character cards. The game is divided into several non-consecutive levels, some of which are locked at the beginning of the game until the player collects enough Triwizard Shields to unlock it.

== Reception ==
Goblet of Fire received "mixed or average" reviews across all versions of the game, according to video game review aggregator platform Metacritic. (Note: Metacritic Review scores: Nintendo DS: 68% Game Boy Advance: 71% GameCube: 69% PC: 66% PlayStation 2: 68% PlayStation Portable: 70% and Xbox: 68%) In Japan, where the GameCube and Nintendo DS were ported on November 26, 2005, Famitsu gave it a combined score of 28 out of 40 for the DS version; and 27 out of 40 for the GameCube version. Famitsu Cube + Advance gave both the DS and GameCube versions a score of 27 out of 40.

Detroit Free Press gave the GameCube version all four stars and said, "This is a masterful video game because it can be enjoyed on many levels. Younger players can simply explore this graphically rich Harry Potter world and succeed. Older players will enjoy manipulating the magic by choosing spells and skills and casting magic together with friends." However, The Sydney Morning Herald gave the game three stars out of five and stated that its highlight "is a brief but thrilling broomstick chase against a fire-breathing dragon. An underwater interlude is less successful, although it provides variety."

Reception

Aggregate score
Aggregator	Score						
Aggregator	DS	GBA	GameCube	PC	PS2	PSP	Xbox
Metacritic	68/100	71/100	69/100	66/100	68/100	70/100	68/100

Review scores
Publication	Score						
Publication	DS	GBA	GameCube	PC	PS2	PSP	Xbox
Eurogamer	N/A	N/A	N/A	6/10	N/A	N/A	N/A
Famitsu	28/40 (C+A) 27/40	N/A	27/40	N/A	N/A	N/A	N/A
Game Informer	N/A	N/A	6.5/10	N/A	6.5/10	N/A	6.5/10
GamePro	N/A	N/A	3/5	N/A	3/5	N/A	3/5
GameSpot	6.5/10	6.6/10	7.3/10	7.3/10	7.3/10	7.3/10	7.3/10
GameSpy	2/5	2/5	3.5/5	N/A	3.5/5	3/5	3.5/5
GameTrailers	N/A	N/A	5.8/10	5.8/10	5.8/10	N/A	5.8/10
GameZone	8/10	7.7/10	7.5/10	8/10	7.1/10	7.8/10	7.5/10
IGN	7.8/10	7.4/10	7.2/10	7.2/10	7.2/10	7.5/10	7.2/10
Nintendo Power	8/10	8/10	8.5/10	N/A	N/A	N/A	N/A
Official U.S. PlayStation Magazine	N/A	N/A	N/A	N/A	3.5/5	3.5/5	N/A
Official Xbox Magazine (US)	N/A	N/A	N/A	N/A	N/A	N/A	7/10
PC Gamer (US)	N/A	N/A	N/A	35%	N/A	N/A	N/A
X-Play	N/A	N/A	3/5	3/5	3/5	N/A	3/5
Detroit Free Press	N/A	N/A	4/4	N/A	N/A	N/A	N/A
Sydney Morning Herald	N/A	N/A	3/5	3/5	3/5	N/A	3/5

The PlayStation 2 version of The Goblet of Fire received a "Platinum" sales award from the Entertainment and Leisure Software Publishers Association (ELSPA), indicating sales of at least 300,000 copies in the United Kingdom.
