= Supporting character =

Character in a narrative that is not focused on by the primary storyline

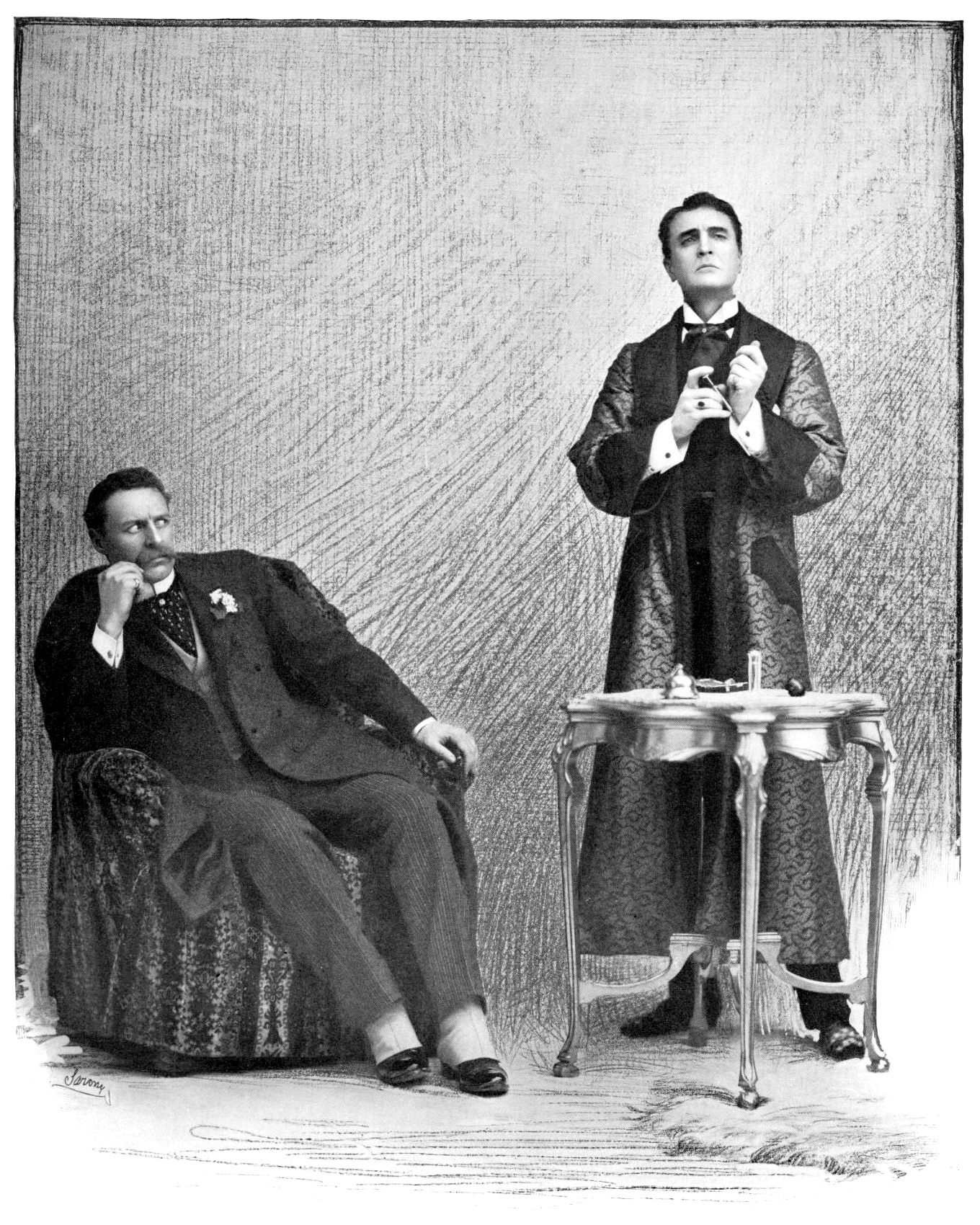
Dr. Watson (left), the supporting character in the stories of Sherlock Holmes (right).

A supporting character, also known as a secondary character or side character, is a character in a narrative that is not the focus of the primary storyline, but is important to the plot/protagonist, and appears or is mentioned in the story enough to be more than just a minor character or a cameo appearance. Supporting characters differ from minor characters because they have complex backstory of their own, desires, and emotions. While this is usually in relation to the main character, rather than entirely independently, developed supporting characters add layers and dimension to the story and the protagonist. These back stories can increase the plot or further develop the main character. Different supporting characters have different roles.

Some common types of supporting characters include: love interest, antagonist, best friend, mentor, sidekick, comic relief, and caregiver. Each supporting character has their own role that advances the plot and brings about conflict.

Often, supporting characters can cross over into different tropes. Some examples of well-known supporting characters include Watson in the Sherlock Holmes stories, Donkey in the Shrek films, and Ron Weasley in the Harry Potter franchise. No matter what type of supporting character, they all help the protagonist achieve their purpose, advance the story, or have personal growth. Supporting characters fit into three broad categories: supporters, antagonists, and informants.

== Types ==
=== Supporters ===
Supporters include caregivers, love interests, comedic relief, and close friends. They are generally important to the protagonist, so they often become the target or victim to the antagonist. They also characterize the protagonist through dialogue and their relationship. They offer the protagonist aid, companionship, and physical or emotional help. Ron Weasley and Hermione Granger in the Harry Potter series are examples of supporters.

=== Antagonists ===
Antagonists are the opposite of the protagonists and act as the conflict of the story. They challenge the protagonist and aid in teaching them a lesson. The Joker is a popular antagonist in the Batman series.

=== Informants ===
Informants are characters that help the protagonist on a journey of personal growth or information. They can be mentors, guides, or messengers. They provide wisdom and direction for the protagonist, often at a crossroads in their journey. Yoda in the Star Wars franchise is an example of an informant.

== Television ==
In television, supporting characters may appear in more than half of episodes per season. In some cases, especially in ongoing material such as comic books and television series, supporting characters themselves may become main characters in a spin-off if they gain sufficient approval from their audience.

== See also ==
- Bit part
- Henchman
- Subplot
- Supporting actor
