= Kathryn White =

English writer

Kathryn White is a British children's book author based in Bristol.

== Background ==
Kathryn White was born in Bradford-on-Avon, England in 1956, and now lives in Somerset with her husband David and their two teenage children; Kathryn and David also have three grown-up children.

Kathryn is an active member of the Society of Authors; she contributed a poem, A Mother's War Song, to the Frances Lincoln anthology, Lines in the Sand (2004), which highlighted the plight of children in the conflict in Iraq; and she wrote a short story, Roman Gladiators, for inclusion in Scholastic's Wow! 366 anthology, appearing alongside other contributors such as Roddy Doyle and Charlie Higson. The anthology featured 366 short stories, each of 366 words and was aimed at helping literacy, with proceeds from the book being donated to Childline.

In 2009 Kathryn was one of a group of authors pressing Somerset County Council to maintain its funding of the Children's Library Service.

== Early works ==
Kathryn began her writing career when her three older children were already at Senior School, and she was in her forties. By then she felt comfortable enough to revisit her own rather troubled childhood which she did in her first book, "When They Fight", which was published by OUP in 1998. She partnered with Cliff Wright, who illustrated the story in a sensitive manner using pictures of Badgers - this was to be the first in a series of partnerships with leading illustrators who have helped bring Kathryn's characters to life.

Also during this period, Kathryn wrote her first work for Egmont, entitled Snowshoe the Hare (illustrated by Ruth Rivers), which was published in 2005.

Kathryn began her longstanding relationship with Educational Publishers, Ginn, in 1999. Since then she has contributed to a number of books of short stories, including her own first short story, the Tupilak, published by Ginn as a separate volume in 2000.

== Little Tiger Press ==
Since 2003, Kathryn has been working with Little Tiger Press, for whom she has written three picture books to date: The Nutty Nut Chase (illustrated by Vanessa Cabban) in 2005; the best selling, Here Comes the Crocodile (illustrated by Michael Terry), in 2003; and the sequel, Click, Clack, Crocodile's Back (illustrated by Joelle Dreidemy), in 2009.

With strong support from Little Tiger, Kathryn's work has reached a much wider audience; and Here Comes the Crocodile was shortlisted for both the Nottingham Children's Book Award and the Sheffield Book Award in 2005.

Kathryn has also written a series of six books for very young children for Caterpillar Books: the first, Sleepy Time (illustrated by Sanja Reskek), was published in 2009; and the latest, Cheese Hunt (illustrated by Corinne Bittler), was published in 2010.

== Barefoot Books ==
In 2009, Kathryn began working with Tessa Strickland, co-founder of Barefoot Books, on a new character called Ruby. The first product of this collaboration is Ruby's School Walk, published by Barefoot in 2010.

== Other work ==
Kathryn is a frequent visitor to Literary Festivals throughout the UK. She has regularly presented fun activities and story telling at both the Birmingham Children's Book Festival and the Cheltenham Literary Festival.

In 2006 and again in 2009, Kathryn performed at the Edinburgh International Children's Book Festival, where she presented a mix of fun, animal mask-making and stories in the Workshop Tent. She was supported at the 2009 event by her friend and fellow author Julia Donaldson who made a cameo appearance as a Crocodile.

Kathryn also carries out school and library visits in the UK.

== Bibliography ==
- Good Day, Bad Day (illustrated by Cliff Wright), (Oxford University Press, 2000)
- When They Fight (illustrated by Cliff Wright), (Oxford University Press, 2002)
- The Hunt, (Heinemann (book publisher), 2002)
- The Tupilak, (Heinemann (book publisher), 2002)
- Heads or Tails, (Heinemann (book publisher), 2004)
- Girls Watch, (Heinemann (book publisher), 2004)
- Splitzaroni, (Badger Publishing, 2004)
- Lines in the Sand (contributing author), (Frances Lincoln, 2004)
- Here Comes the Crocodile (illustrated by Michael Terry), (Little Tiger Press, 2004)
- The Nutty Nut Chase (illustrated by Vanessa Cabban), (Little Tiger Press, 2004)
- Pitch Pond Curse, (Heinemann (book publisher), 2005)
- Ghost Thief, (Heinemann (book publisher), 2005)
- Snowshoe the Hare, (Egmont Publishing, 2005)
- Wow!366 (contributing author), (Scholastic Corporation, 2008)
- Sleepy Time, (Caterpillar Books, 2009)
- Sharks on the Loose, (Oxford University Press, 2009)
- Click, Clack, Crocodile's Back, (Little Tiger Press, 2009)
- Carving the Sea Path, (Evans Brothers, 2009)
- Play Time, (Caterpillar Books, 2010)
- Tea Time, (Caterpillar Books, 2010)
- Bath Time, (Caterpillar Books, 2010)
- Cheese Hunt, (Caterpillar Books, 2010)
- Ruby's School Walk, (Barefoot Books, 2010)
