= Rachel Sternberg =

English voice actress

- Born: Rachel Sternberg; London, England
- Occupation: Voice actress
- Years active: 2006–2009

Rachel Sternberg is an English voice actress. She is known for her voice-acting role as Hermione Granger in the 2009 video game of Harry Potter and the Half-Blood Prince. She also played a role in Jeff Wayne's Musical Version of The War of the Worlds.

== Filmography ==
- Jeff Wayne's Musical Version of The War of the Worlds (2006) - Additional voices
- Harry Potter and the Half-Blood Prince (2009) - Hermione Granger
