= Thomas Taylor (artist) =

British illustrator and writer of children's books

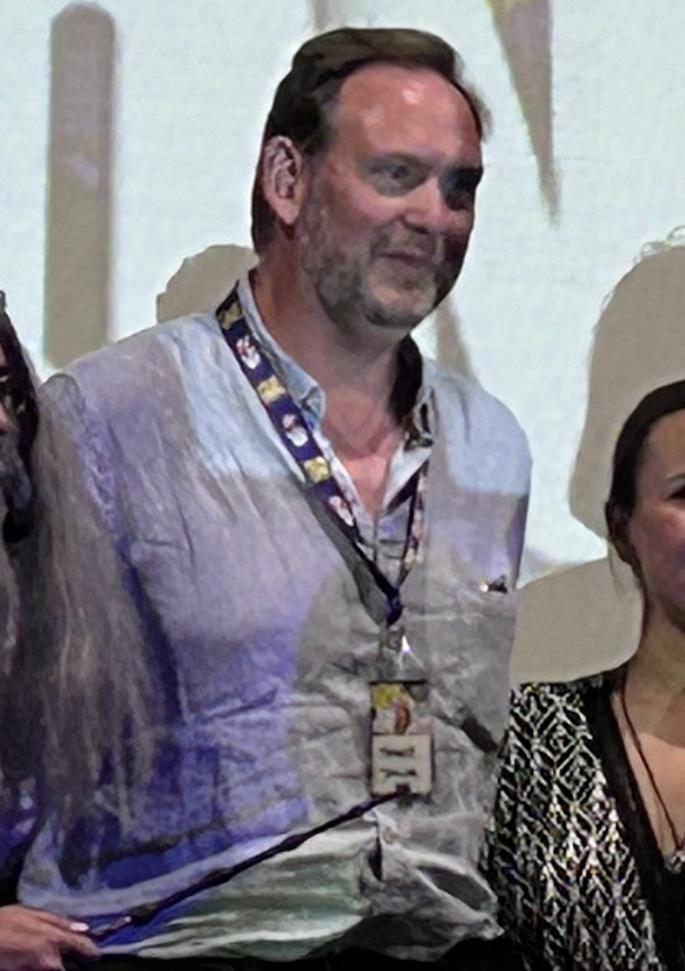
- Born: Thomas Henry Taylor; 22 May 1973 (age 53); England
- Occupations: Illustrator, author
- Writing career
- Pen name: Thomas Taylor
- Genre: Children's books (Illustrator)
- Notable works: Harry Potter and the Philosopher's Stone (original illustration), Malamander

Thomas Henry Taylor (born 22 May 1973) is an English children's writer and illustrator. He painted the cover art for the first edition of Harry Potter and the Philosopher's Stone.

== Biography ==
Taylor attended Norwich School of Art and Design in 1991. Then he studied illustration at Anglia Ruskin University in Cambridge, graduating in 1995.

In 1997, Taylor painted his first professional commission, a cover illustration for a children's book, Harry Potter and the Philosopher's Stone, by then unknown author J. K. Rowling, for which he was paid a flat fee of two or three hundred pounds. In 2001, Taylor's original pencil and watercolour drawing sold for £85,750; in June 2024, it sold for £1.52 million at auction at Sotheby's in New York. Taylor was replaced by the more experienced illustrator Cliff Wright for the next book in the Harry Potter series.

He has written and illustrated several picture books, starting with George and Sophie's Museum Adventure in 1999, and has two children's novels, Haunters and Dan of the Dead. The first one was published in May, 2012 by The Chicken House and the last one was published on 1 June 2012 by Bloomsbury Publishing. Dan of the Dead sequel named Dan and the Caverns of Bone was issued in June, 2013. The book The Pets You Get with his illustrations won the Stockport Schools' Book Award in 2013 (early years category) and also the Oldham Brilliant Books Award.

== Picture books ==
- George and Sophie's Museum Adventure (1999)
- The Chocolate Biscuit Tree (2001)
- The Loudest Roar (2002)
- The Biggest Splash (2005)
- The Noisiest Night (2007)
- Jack's Tractor (2009)
- Little Mouse and the Big Cupcake (2010)
- The Pets You Get (2012)
- Too Many Tickles (2013)

== Fiction ==
- Haunters (2012)
- Dan and the Dead (2012)
- Dan and the Caverns of Bone (2013)
- Malamander (2019)
- Gargantis (2020)
- Shadowghast (2021)
- Festergrimm (2022)
- Mermedusa (2023)
