= Harry Potter and the Prisoner of Azkaban (video game) =

2004 action-adventure video game

- European PC cover art
- Developers: KnowWonder (Microsoft Windows); Griptonite Games (Game Boy Advance); EA UK (PlayStation 2, Xbox, GameCube)
- Publisher: Electronic Arts
- Directors: Phillip Trumbo (PC, GBA)
- Producers: Michael Waite, Steve Reddoch (PC)
- Designers: Christopher Vucetich, Chris Brockett, Ed Byrne, Del Chafe III (PC); Tony Sharma, Tom Snider, Brian C. McAuliffe, Dream Smith (GBA)
- Programmer: Michael Dorgan (GBA)
- Artists: Kerwin Burton, Luke Anderson, Eric Gingrich (PC); Eric Heitman (GBA)
- Writers: Michael Humes (PC, GBA)
- Composers: Jeremy Soule; Ian Stocker (GBA)
- Series: Wizarding World
- Engine: Unreal Engine 2 (Microsoft Windows); RenderWare (PlayStation 2, Xbox, GameCube)
- Platforms: Game Boy Advance; Microsoft Windows; PlayStation 2; Xbox; GameCube
- Release: Microsoft Windows, Game Boy Advance: NA: 25 May 2004; EU: 29 May 2004; PlayStation 2, Xbox, GameCube: EU: 29 May 2004; NA: 2 June 2004
- Genres: Action-adventure; Role-playing (GBA)
- Mode: Single-player

Harry Potter and the Prisoner of Azkaban is a 2004 action-adventure video game based on the 2004 Harry Potter film of the same name. It was developed by KnowWonder, Griptonite Games and EA UK each for different consoles and was published by Electronic Arts under the EA Games label. The game was released as a trio, with separate versions for Game Boy Advance, Microsoft Windows and home consoles (released on PlayStation 2, Xbox, and GameCube). It received mixed reviews on all platforms.

== Plot ==
The games follows Harry Potter (voiced by Adam Sopp) along with Ron Weasley (voiced by Gregg Chillin) and Hermione Granger (voiced by Harper Marshall) as they return to Hogwarts School of Witchcraft and Wizardry. Prisoner Sirius Black has escaped the wizard prison Azkaban, and is supposedly ready to attack Harry in Hogwarts. The game begins on the Hogwarts Express, (Note: With the exception of the GBA version, which begins in the Leaky Cauldron) ignoring the events at Harry's home. Upon reaching Hogwarts, the trio follow the events of the novel, and learn magic by attending classes.

The spells that can be learned include carpe retractum, a spell that allows an object to be pulled towards the caster, or the caster be pulled towards the object; Steleus, a spell that causes sneezing and expecto patronum, a spell to defend against dementors. Using their skills, the trio, along with Remus Lupin (Jamie Glover) investigate Black. Finding that Black is innocent of all crimes, and looking out for Harry, the team defend Black from a horde of dementors, allowing him to escape.

== Gameplay and versions ==
Much like Harry Potter and the Chamber of Secrets, different versions of this game were produced for the different platforms. The game was developed for PC by KnowWonder, whereas home console versions for the (PlayStation 2, Xbox and GameCube) were developed by Electronic Arts UK, and a handheld version for the Game Boy Advance was developed by Griptonite Games. All games were published by EA and Warner Bros. The game differs between platforms; while the console release has a traditional 3D over the shoulder perspective, featuring boss fights and detective sections, the PC version features similar puzzle solving missions as those in earlier releases. The Game Boy Advance release plays as a traditional role playing game, similar to games like Dragon Quest. The PlayStation 2 version features mini-games compatible with the EyeToy. In addition to playing as the titular character Harry, the game also allows the player to control Hermione and Ron, as well as fly Buckbeak, and control Harry's pet owl, Hedwig.

== Reception ==
Reception

Aggregate score
Aggregator	Score				
Aggregator	GBA	GameCube	PC	PS2	Xbox
Metacritic	69/100	67/100	67/100	70/100	67/100

Review scores
Publication	Score				
Publication	GBA	GameCube	PC	PS2	Xbox
Electronic Gaming Monthly	N/A	N/A	N/A	6.5/10	N/A
Famitsu	27/40	30/40	N/A	30/40	N/A
Game Informer	8/10	N/A	N/A	6.5/10	N/A
GamePro	3/5	3/5	3/5	3/5	3/5
GameRevolution	N/A	C	C	N/A	C
GameSpot	7.5/10	N/A	7/10	7.2/10	7/10
GameSpy	N/A	N/A	N/A	3/5	3/5
GameZone	7.5/10	N/A	6.5/10	9/10	6.8/10
IGN	6.5/10	6/10	6/10	6.2/10	6.1/10
Nintendo Power	4.4/5	3.9/5	N/A	N/A	N/A
Official U.S. PlayStation Magazine	N/A	N/A	N/A	4/5	N/A
Official Xbox Magazine (US)	N/A	N/A	N/A	N/A	7/10
PC Gamer (US)	N/A	N/A	72%	N/A	N/A

Harry Potter and the Prisoner of Azkaban received "mixed or average" reviews according to review aggregator Metacritic. GameSpot was positive about the game, scoring 7/10 or above across releases, with a high of 7.5 out of 10 for the Game Boy Advance version. Frank Provo of GameSpot was very positive about the GBA game's recreation of the novel, saying "The main thing to keep in mind is that Prisoner of Azkaban on the GBA offers a fun way for Harry Potter fans to step into the shoes of their favorite wizard-in-training and experience firsthand everything that happened in the third installment of the series." GameZone also reviewed the GBA version, calling it "a really fun romp in Harry's world! Fans should be well-pleased." IGN commented on the game not forcing random battes from similar RPGs as a positive, but saying that it wasn't "enough to make Prisoner of Azkaban a successful RPG. It's got a solid storyline based on the book and film, and dozens of quests that branch outwards from situations from the film ... but the experience is hindered slightly, simply by sloppy implementation of standard gaming elements."

Matt Casamassina of IGN reviewed the PS2 version. He gave the game a 6.2 rating out of 10, saying "In some cases, it's prettier than any other 'Boy Wizard' game. In some cases, it's smarter. As a long-time Potter fan who has read all of the books and watched every movie, I've always been particularly interested in this chapter of the franchise. And this game does deliver a good amount of compelling story and play. I especially enjoyed the multi-character-based puzzles and the new spells that Harry, Ron and Hermione can cast, all of them useful for different reasons." However, Casamassina also called the game "sloppy" and criticised the somewhat unpredictable framerate, before concluding, "Potter fans who can deal with the drawbacks will find an entertaining experience hiding. But everyone else should steer clear of this game."

Brad Shoemaker of GameSpot reviewed the PC version, calling the game "easy" before saying, "One, any player of even marginal skill will finish the game in five to six hours, and two, its puzzles and combat are both remarkably easy. Those facts make Prisoner of Azkaban a great game for younger kids, and it's a lot of fun for less-discriminating older fans of Harry Potter too. The game may be short and easy, but it's also thoughtfully designed and genuinely entertaining, and KnowWonder deserves credit for that." Tim Wapshott of The Times gave the game a score of four stars out of five and stated, "The game remains faithful to the spirit of the book, but it is perhaps a little too linear and predictable. Some scenes do not look quite right – the scale of the characters against the width of the Hogwarts Express clearly do not tally. But these minor disappointments are quickly outweighed by stunning visuals in the later levels. While older teenagers may snub this Harry Potter outing, there's still good mileage in the bespectacled chappie for younger players."

During the 8th Annual Interactive Achievement Awards, the Academy of Interactive Arts & Sciences nominated Harry Potter and the Prisoner of Azkaban for "Computer Family Game of the Year", which was ultimately awarded to Zoo Tycoon 2.

By 2004, the game sold 2.5 million units. In the United States, it sold 1.03 million units by 2006.
