= Cliff Wright (illustrator) =

English artist (born 1963)

Cliff Wright (Newhaven, 24 October 1963) is an artist, book illustrator and advertising artist.

He has illustrated numerous books, specializing in illustrations of animals and children's books, most notably the second and third books in the Harry Potter series - Harry Potter and the Chamber of Secrets and Harry Potter and the Prisoner of Azkaban - and The Wind in the Willows.

He has also been an artist in advertising campaigns for numerous large organizations and corporations - including Greenpeace and IKEA. He has illustrated the Puppy series of board books by Gerald Durrell, commissioned by the Beanie Baby manufacturer Andrex. He has designed numerous posters and cards and is noted for his illustrations of bears and badgers for children.

Wright is an active campaigner for animal rights with International Animal Rescue and has participated in numerous book signings and auctions to raise money to help the dancing bears of India.

== Early career ==
Wright was born in Newhaven, England in 1963. He graduated from the Brighton College of Art in 1986. Wright developed wildlife-based watercolours and children's book ideas in the early phase of his career. In 1989, he published a self-written and illustrated picture book for children titled When the World Sleeps (Hutchinson). This was runner-up in the Mother Goose Award competition, 1989-1990. He followed this up by two more highly successful illustration projects - "Crumbs!" (Hutchinson, 1990) and The Tanglewood Troll (Gollancz, 1993).

== Harry Potter illustrations ==
Bloomsbury approached Cliff Wright for illustrating the British first-edition cover for the second Harry Potter book. The cover illustration for the first book was drawn by Thomas Taylor, a young artist out of college. The popularity of the first book prompted Bloomsbury to select a more experienced illustrator, and hence Cliff Wright was chosen. Wright was the obvious choice for the cover illustrator of the third Harry Potter book as well.

Wright was the first to illustrate the following Harry Potter concepts and characters:

Harry Potter and the Chamber of Secrets (1998):

- Hedwig the owl
- The Weasleys' Ford Anglia
- Hogwarts School of Witchcraft and Wizardry

Harry Potter and the Prisoner of Azkaban (1999):

- The hippogriff Buckbeak
- Sirius Black in his dog form

Wright retains the rights to the illustrations. He refused to illustrate the fourth Harry Potter book after Bloomsbury lost his original front and back cover artwork for Harry Potter and the Prisoner of Azkaban. The huge black market of the Harry Potter fandom has been rumoured to be the cause of the disappearance. He also sued Bloomsbury for offering insufficient compensation.

The original artwork for the second book, Harry Potter and the Chamber of Secrets, went on auction at Christie's in 2001 but was unsuccessful at meeting the reserve price of £30,000. The work has since been acquired by investor Luke Heron on behalf of illustration investment company Storyboard Assets Plc for an undisclosed sum. The original art for the first book raised £85,000 at auction.

== Post-Harry Potter work ==
Cliff Wright conducts an innovative drawing workshop annually, titled the Art of Seeing. Wright has illustrated numerous books for the publishing houses of Ladybird Books and Oxford University Press, in the 1990s and 2000s. He has also written and illustrated the "Little Bear" series of board books from Templar Publishing.

He also illustrated the cover of the fantasy novel I Ribelli dell'Alianco (2023) by the italian author Marina Lenti.

== Bibliography ==
- When the World Sleeps, (Hutchinson, 1989)
- Crumbs! (Hutchinson, 1990)
- The Explorers, (Hutchinson, 1992)
- The Tanglewood Troll (Gollancz, 1993)
- Puppy Tales (written by Gerald Durrell), (Andrex, 1993)
- The Wind in the Willows (written by Kenneth Grahame), (Ladybird Books, 1994)
- The Flying Squirrel and Other Stories from the Woodlands (written by Frances Ball), (Peter Lowe, 1995)
- A Treasury of Classic Stories (written by E. Nesbit et al., co-illustrated by George Buchanan and David Barnett), (Ladybird Books, 1995)
- Oxford Reading Tree: Stages 1–9: Rhyme and Analogy: Story Rhymes, (written by Roderick Hunt et al., co-illustrated by Alex Brychta), (Oxford University Press, 1996) (TES award winner for an educational book)
- Henry's Kite (written by Miriam Moss, Cliff Wright), (Hazar Publishing, 1996)
- This Way, Little Badger (written by Phil McMylor), (Ladybird Books, 1996)
- The Star That Fell (by Karen Hayles), (Ladybird Books, 1996)
- Sasha and the Wolfcub (written by Ann Jungman), (Collins, 1996)
- Windswept (written by Miriam Moss, Cliff Wright), (Hazar Publishing, 1997)
- Are We Nearly There? (written by Joan Stimson), (Ladybird Books, 1998)
- Peter and the Wolf (written by Sergei Prokofiev, retold by Nicola Baxter), (Ladybird Books, 1999)
- Good Day, Bad Day (written by Kathryn White), (Oxford University Press, 2000)
- DK Share-a-Story: Are You Spring? (written by Caroline Pitcher), (Dorling Kindersley, 2000)
- When They Fight (written by Kathryn White), (Oxford University Press, 2002)
- My Wishes for You (by Adèle Geras), (Piccadilly Press, 2002)
- Bear series: Bear and Kite, The Three Bears, Bear and Ball (Templar Publishing, 2005)
- The Tizzle Sisters and Erik (written by G. P. Taylor, adapted by Tony Lee, co-illustrated with Dan Boultwood), (Markosia Enterprises Ltd, 2006)
