= Harper Marshall =

English voice actress

- Born: Harper Page Marshall; London, England
- Occupation: Voice actress
- Years active: 2001–2007

Harper Page Marshall is an English voice actress. She is known for her role as Hermione Granger in the video games of Harry Potter and the Prisoner of Azkaban, Harry Potter and the Goblet of Fire, and Harry Potter and the Order of the Phoenix. She also provided a voice for Malice: A Kat's Tale.

== Filmography ==
- Malice: A Kat's Tale (2004) - Additional voices
- Harry Potter and the Prisoner of Azkaban (2004) - Hermione Granger
- Harry Potter and the Goblet of Fire (2005) - Hermione Granger
- Harry Potter and the Order of the Phoenix (2007) - Hermione Granger
