= Beauxbatons =

Fictional Harry Potter French magic school

Coat of arms of Beauxbatons

Beauxbatons Academy of Magic is a French magic school in the fictional universe of Harry Potter created by the British author J. K. Rowling. Beauxbatons (French: [bo.ba.tɔ̃]) translates from French as "beautiful sticks".

== Description ==
In the fourth book of the series, Harry Potter and the Goblet of Fire (2000), students from Beauxbatons arrive at Hogwarts to take part in the Triwizard Tournament. They arrive in a carriage, brought by winged Palomino horses.

The delegation is led by headmistress Madame Olympe Maxime, a half-giantess; who, despite her proportions, is described as beautiful, graceful, and well-dressed. Fleur Delacour is also singled out in the group, and is the Beauxbatons champion in the Triwizard Tournament. She is described as a beautiful girl with silvery hair, and is a quarter-veela.

Beauxbatons is described as a boarding school located in the Pyrenees mountains of southern France full of ice sculptures and forest nymphs. Beauxbatons has a preponderance of French students; though Spanish, Portuguese, Dutch, Luxembourgers and Belgians also attend in large numbers.

== Students ==
Students of Beauxbatons are described rather stereotypically, mainly as beautiful long-haired girls and attractive boys, in contrast with the serious and surly students from the Eastern European school Durmstrang. They have good manners and in general are positive, while the unpleasant appearance of Durmstrang students implies their dishonesty. Similarly, the carriage of the Beauxbatons is well-lit and nice, while the ship, by which the students of Durmstrang arrive, is gloomy.

They speak French and stereotypical, heavily accented English. Jean-François Ménard, the translator of Harry Potter into French, wrote Madame Maxime as arrogant with very correct, aristocratic speech, while Fleur's tone was more distrustful. Ménard made these choices because "you cannot write French with a French accent".

In the screen adaptation Harry Potter and the Goblet of Fire, Beauxbatons students are all female and Durmstrang students are all male, in contrast to the books which portray both schools as co-educational.

== Criticism ==
The portrayal of the two foreign schools has been criticized as stereotypical. On the whole, the students of Beauxbatons, just as the students of Durmstrang, are homogeneous, not showing the cultural diversity of Hogwarts.

The contrast between Durmstrang and Hogwarts can be interpreted as an allusion to the war of the West with the bad from the East, as described in the gothic fiction of the nineteenth century, and contrast between Beauxbatons and Hogwarts as an allusion to the competition between the reasonable and decent Great Britain and the licentious and decadent France. It has been argued that the appearance on the foreground of these old conflicts allows J K. Rowling to sublimate them, and to make them irrelevant to modern readers.

The three different magic schools have also been interpreted as representing the Allies in World War II, with Beauxbatons standing in for France, in opposition to "Voldemort and his followers represent[ing] Germany".
