= Harry Potter and the Philosopher's Stone =

1997 fantasy novel by J. K. Rowling

- Cover for one of the earliest UK editions
- Author: J. K. Rowling
- Illustrator: Thomas Taylor (first edition)
- Language: English
- Series: Harry Potter
- Release number: 1st in series
- Genre: Fantasy
- Set in: United Kingdom
- Publisher: Bloomsbury (UK); Scholastic (US)
- Publication date: 26 June 1997
- Publication place: United Kingdom
- Pages: 223 (first edition)
- ISBN: 978-0-7475-3269-9
- Followed by: Harry Potter and the Chamber of Secrets

Harry Potter and the Philosopher's Stone is a fantasy novel by British author J. K. Rowling. It is the first novel in the Harry Potter series and was Rowling's debut novel. It follows Harry Potter, a young wizard who discovers his magical heritage on his eleventh birthday when he receives a letter of acceptance from Hogwarts School of Witchcraft and Wizardry. With the help of his friends, Ron Weasley and Hermione Granger, Harry unravels a mystery involving the dark wizard Lord Voldemort.

The book was first published in the United Kingdom on 26 June 1997 by Bloomsbury. It was published in the United States the following year by Scholastic Corporation under the title Harry Potter and the Sorcerer's Stone. It won most of the British book awards that were judged by children and other awards in the US. The book reached the top of the New York Times list of best-selling fiction in August 1999, and stayed near the top of that list for much of 1999 and 2000. It has been translated into 85 other languages and made into a feature-length film of the same name, as have all six of its sequels. The novel has sold in excess of 120 million copies, making it the fourth best-selling book of all time.

Most reviews were very favourable, commenting on Rowling's imagination, humour, simple, direct style and clever plot construction, although a few complained that the final chapters seemed rushed. The writing has been compared to that of Jane Austen, one of Rowling's favourite authors; Roald Dahl, whose works dominated children's stories before the appearance of Harry Potter; and the ancient Greek story-teller Homer. While some commentators thought the book looked backward to Victorian and Edwardian boarding school stories, others thought it placed the genre firmly in the modern world by featuring contemporary ethical and social issues, as well as showing overcoming obstacles like bullying.

The Harry Potter series has been used as a source of object lessons in educational techniques, sociological analysis, and marketing.

== Plot ==
Harry Potter lives with his abusive uncle and aunt, Vernon and Petunia Dursley, and their bullying son, Dudley, in the fictional English town of Little Whinging in 1991. On Harry's eleventh birthday, he learns that he is a wizard when a half-giant named Rubeus Hagrid invites him to attend Hogwarts, a school of magic. Hagrid explains that when Harry was an infant, a dark wizard named Voldemort murdered Harry's parents and tried to kill Harry as well. However, Voldemort's killing curse rebounded and seemingly destroyed him, leaving a lightning bolt-shaped scar on Harry's forehead.

Hagrid takes Harry to Diagon Alley, where Harry discovers he is famous among wizards. He buys a wand, an owl named Hedwig, and other school supplies. A month later, Harry takes the Hogwarts Express to Hogwarts. During the journey, he befriends Ron Weasley, a fellow first-year student. He also meets Hermione Granger and has a confrontation with Draco Malfoy. At Hogwarts, a magical Sorting Hat assigns each first-year student to a House. Harry, Ron, and Hermione are assigned to Gryffindor, although the Hat considers putting Harry in Slytherin.

Harry's skill at broomstick flying earns him a place on the Gryffindor Quidditch team as the Seeker. He develops a dislike for the Potions professor Severus Snape, who seems to hate Harry. One night, Harry and Ron discover a gigantic three-headed dog guarding a trapdoor. The two boys later save Hermione from a troll and begin a friendship with her. During Harry's first Quidditch match, his broomstick attempts to throw him off. Snape's strange behaviour during the match convinces Hermione that Snape jinxed Harry's broom. On Christmas, Harry receives an anonymous gift—his father's invisibility cloak. While using the cloak to explore the school undetected, he discovers the Mirror of Erised, which shows the viewer what they most desire. Harry sees his parents and other members of his family in the mirror.

In 1992, Harry, Ron, and Hermione learn that the three-headed dog is guarding a magical object called the Philosopher's Stone, which grants its user immortality. A centaur named Firenze warns Harry that Voldemort is plotting to steal the Stone to restore his body. When the headmaster, Albus Dumbledore, is lured away from Hogwarts, Harry and his friends fear the theft is imminent and descend through the trapdoor to retrieve the Stone. Various obstacles force Ron and Hermione to remain behind while Harry approaches the Stone. He encounters Professor Quirrell, the Defence Against the Dark Arts instructor, who explains that he serves Voldemort and that it was he who jinxed Harry's broom; Snape was trying to save Harry during the match. Quirrell attempts to retrieve the Stone from the Mirror of Erised, but cannot figure out how. When Harry looks in the Mirror, he feels the Stone drop into his pocket. Quirrell then reveals that Voldemort has possessed his body, and shows Harry Voldemort's face on the back of his head. Quirrell attempts to seize the Stone, but his flesh burns upon contact with Harry. As Harry and Quirrell struggle, Harry's scar begins to burn, and he passes out.

Harry awakens in the school's infirmary. Dumbledore explains that Harry survived because he is protected by a magical charm that was created when his mother died trying to protect him. Quirrell's hatred and greed caused him to burn upon contact with Harry, and Voldemort abandoned him to die. Dumbledore also reveals that the Stone has been destroyed. During the school's end-of-year feast, Gryffindor is awarded the House Cup. Harry then returns to the home of the Dursleys for the summer.

== Characters ==
- Harry Potter is an orphan whom Rowling imagined as a "scrawny, black-haired, bespectacled boy who didn't know he was a wizard". She developed the series' story and characters to explain how Harry came to be in this situation and how his life unfolded from there. Apart from the first chapter, the events of this book take place just before and in the year following Harry's eleventh birthday. Voldemort's attack left a lightning bolt-shaped scar on Harry's forehead, which produces stabbing pains whenever Voldemort is present. Harry has a natural talent for Quidditch and became the first person in a century to get on their team in their first year.
- Ron Weasley is Harry's age, and Rowling describes him as the ultimate best friend "always there when you need him". He is freckled, red-haired, and quite tall. He grew up in a fairly large pure-blood family as the sixth born of seven children. Although his family is quite poor, they still live comfortably and happily. His loyalty and bravery in the face of a game of Wizard Chess plays a vital part in finding the Philosopher's Stone.
- Hermione Granger, the daughter of an all-Muggle family, is a bossy girl who has apparently memorised most of the textbooks before the start of term. Rowling described Hermione as a "very logical, upright, and good" character with "a lot of insecurity and a great fear of failure beneath her swottiness". Despite her nagging efforts to keep Harry and Ron out of trouble, she becomes a close friend of the two boys after they save her from a troll and her magical and analytical skills play an important role in finding the Philosopher's Stone. She has bushy brown hair and rather large front teeth.
- Neville Longbottom is a plump, diffident boy, so forgetful that his grandmother gives him a Remembrall, to remind him if he forgets something. Neville's magical abilities are weak and appeared just in time to save his life when he was eight. Despite his timidity, Neville will fight anyone after some encouragement or if he thinks it is right and important.
- Rubeus Hagrid, a half-giant nearly 12 feet (3.7 m) tall, with tangled black hair and beard, who was expelled from Hogwarts and his wand was snapped in half (resulting in him never to use a wand again), though Professor Dumbledore let him stay on as the school's gamekeeper, a job which enables him to give lavish affection, care and even pet names (such as Norbert the dragon) on even the most dangerous of magical creatures. Hagrid is fiercely loyal to Dumbledore and quickly becomes a close friend of Harry, Ron and, later, Hermione, but his carelessness makes him unreliable.
- Professor Albus Dumbledore, a tall, thin man who wears half-moon spectacles, has silver hair and a beard long enough to tuck into his belt, is the headmaster of Hogwarts, and thought to be the only wizard Voldemort fears. Dumbledore, while renowned for his achievements in magic, shrugs off praise, though he is aware of his own brilliance. Rowling described him as the "epitome of goodness".
- Professor Minerva McGonagall, a tall, severe-looking woman with black hair tied in a tight bun, teaches Transfiguration and is able to transform herself into a cat. She is Deputy Headmistress and Head of Gryffindor House.
- Petunia Dursley, the sister of Harry's mother Lily, is a thin woman with a long neck that she uses for spying on the neighbours. As a Muggle, she regards her magical sister as a freak and tries to pretend that she never existed.
- Vernon Dursley, the husband of Petunia Dursley, is a heavily built man whose irascible bluster covers a narrow mind and a fear of anything unusual.
- Dudley Dursley is an overweight, spoilt bully and Harry's cousin.
- Draco Malfoy is a slim, pale boy who speaks in a bored drawl. He is arrogant about his skill in Quidditch, and despises anyone who is not a pure-blood wizard and wizards who do not share his views. His parents had supported Voldemort, but changed sides after the dark wizard's disappearance, claiming they had been bewitched. Draco avoids direct confrontations and tries to get Harry and his friends into trouble.
- Oliver Wood is a fifth year who acts as Harry's Quidditch captain and keeper for the Gryffindor Quidditch team.
- Professor Quirrell is a twitching, stammering, and nervous man who teaches Defence Against the Dark Arts. Reputedly he was a brilliant scholar, but his nerve was shattered by an encounter with vampires. Quirrell wears a turban to conceal the fact that he is voluntarily possessed by Voldemort, whose face appears on the back of Quirrell's head.
- Professor Severus Snape, who has a hooked nose, sallow complexion, and greasy black hair, teaches Potions, but would prefer to teach Defence Against the Dark Arts. Snape favours pupils in his own House of Slytherin, and appears to delight in humiliating those from other houses, especially Harry. Several incidents, beginning with the shooting pain in Harry's scar during the start-of-term feast, lead Harry and his friends to think Snape is aiding Voldemort.
- Argus Filch, the school caretaker who knows the school's secret passages better than anyone else except, perhaps, the Weasley twins. His cat, Mrs. Norris, aids his constant hunt for misbehaving pupils.

Other members of staff include: the dumpy Herbology teacher and Head of Hufflepuff House Professor Sprout, Professor Flitwick, the tiny and excitable Charms teacher and Head of Ravenclaw House, the soporific History of magic teacher, Professor Binns, a ghost who does not seem to have noticed his own death, and Madam Hooch, the Quidditch coach, who is strict, but a considerate and methodical teacher. The poltergeist Peeves wanders around the castle causing trouble wherever he can.

In the book, Rowling introduces an eclectic cast of characters. The first character to be introduced is Vernon Dursley, Harry's uncle. Most of the actions centre on the eponymous hero, Harry Potter, an orphan who escapes his miserable childhood with the Dursley family. Rowling imagined him as a "scrawny, black-haired, bespectacled boy who didn't know he was a wizard" and says she transferred part of her pain about losing her mother to him. During the book, Harry makes two close friends, Ronald Weasley and Hermione Granger. Ron is described by Rowling as the ultimate best friend, "always there when you need him". Rowling has described Hermione as a "very logical, upright and good" character with "a lot of insecurity and a great fear of failure beneath her swottiness".

Rowling also imagined a supporting cast of adults. The headmaster of Hogwarts is the powerful, but kind wizard Albus Dumbledore, who becomes Harry's confidant. Rowling described him as "the epitome of goodness". His right hand is severe Minerva McGonagall, the friendly half-giant Rubeus Hagrid, who saved Harry from the Dursley family and the sinister Severus Snape. Professor Quirrell is also featured in the novel.

The main antagonists are Draco Malfoy, an elitist, bullying classmate, and Lord Voldemort, the most powerful evil wizard who becomes disembodied when he tries to kill baby Harry. According to a 1999 interview with Rowling, the character of Voldemort was created as a literary foil for Harry and his backstory was intentionally not fleshed-out at first:

The basic idea... Harry, I saw Harry very very very clearly. Very vividly. And I knew he didn't know he was a wizard. ... And so then I kind of worked backwards from that position to find out how that could be, that he wouldn't know what he was. ... When he was one year old, the most evil wizard for hundreds and hundreds of years attempted to kill him. He killed Harry's parents, and then he tried to kill Harry—he tried to curse him. ... And—so—but for some mysterious reason, the curse didn't work on Harry. So he's left with this lightning bolt shaped scar on his forehead and the curse rebounded upon the evil wizard, who has been in hiding ever since.

== Development, publication and reception ==
=== Development ===
The book, which was Rowling's debut novel, was written between approximately June 1990 and some time in 1995. In 1990, Jo Rowling, as she preferred to be known, (Note: J. K. Rowling was christened Joanne Rowling, without a middle name, and adopted the nom de plume J. K. Rowling for publication. She says that she was always known as "Jo". The book's copyright page gives her name as "Joanne Rowling".) wanted to move with her boyfriend to a flat in Manchester and in her words, "One weekend after flat hunting, I took the train back to London on my own and the idea for Harry Potter fell into my head... A scrawny, little, black-haired, bespectacled boy became more and more of a wizard to me... I began to write Philosopher's Stone that very evening. Although, the first couple of pages look nothing like the finished product." Then, Rowling's mother died and, to cope with her pain, Rowling transferred her own anguish to the orphan Harry. Rowling spent six years working on Harry Potter and the Philosopher's Stone.

Rowling sent the book to a literary agent and a publisher and then the second agent she approached spent a year trying to sell the book to publishers, most of whom thought it was too long at about 90,000 words. Barry Cunningham, who was building a portfolio of distinctive fantasies by new authors for Bloomsbury Children's Books, recommended accepting the book and the eight-year-old daughter of Bloomsbury's chief executive said it was "so much better than anything else".

After it was accepted by Bloomsbury, she obtained a grant of £8,000 from the Scottish Arts Council, which enabled her to plan the sequels.

=== Publication and reception in the United Kingdom ===
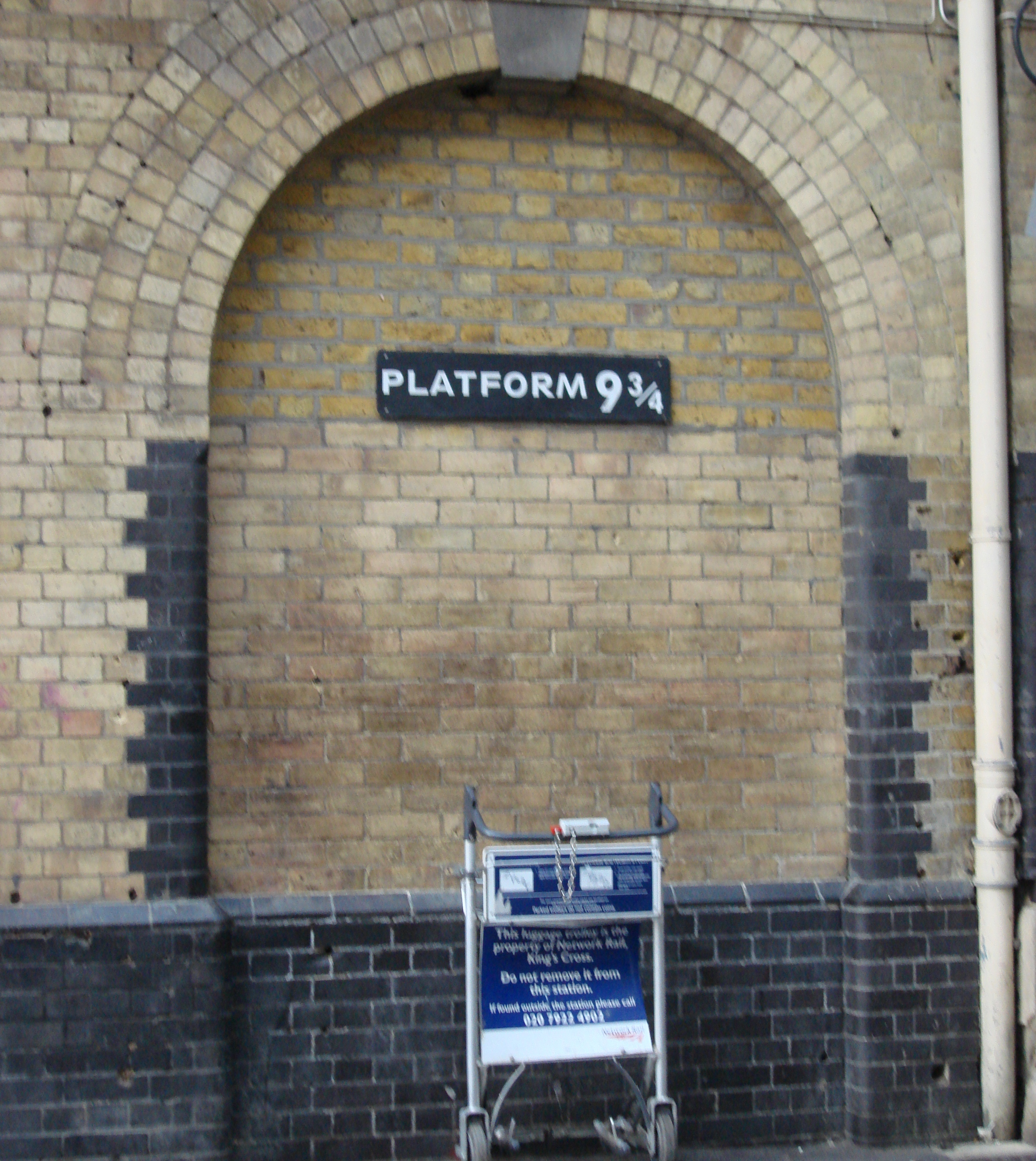
Imitation of the fictional Platform 9 3/4 at the real King's Cross railway station, with a luggage trolley apparently halfway through the magical wall

Bloomsbury accepted the book, paying Rowling a £2,500 advance and Cunningham sent proof copies to carefully chosen authors, critics and booksellers in order to obtain comments that could be quoted when the book was launched. He was less concerned about the book's length than about its author's name, since the title sounded like a boys' book to him and he believed boys preferred books by male authors. Rowling therefore adopted the pen name J. K. Rowling just before publication.

In June 1997, Bloomsbury published Philosopher's Stone with an initial print run of 500 copies in hardback, three hundred of which were distributed to libraries. Her original name, "Joanne Rowling", can be found on the copyright page of all British editions until September 1999. (The 1998 first American edition would remove reference to "Joanne" completely.) The short initial print run was standard for first novels and Cunningham hoped booksellers would read the book and recommend it to customers. Examples from this initial print run have sold for as much as US$471,000 in a 2021 Heritage auction. Thomas Taylor created the cover for the first edition.

Lindsey Fraser, who had previously supplied one of the blurb comments, wrote what is thought to be the first published review, in The Scotsman on 28 June 1997. She described Harry Potter and the Philosopher's Stone as "a hugely entertaining thriller" and Rowling as "a first-rate writer for children". Another early review, in The Herald, said: "I have yet to find a child who can put it down." Newspapers outside Scotland started to notice the book, with glowing reviews in The Guardian and The Sunday Times and in September 1997 Books for Keeps, a magazine that specialised in children's books, gave the novel four stars out of five. The Sunday Times said: "comparisons to Dahl are, this time, justified", while The Guardian called it "a richly textured novel given lift-off by an inventive wit" and The Scotsman said it had "all the makings of a classic".

In 1997 the UK edition won a National Book Award and a gold medal in the 9- to 11-year-olds category of the Nestlé Smarties Book Prize. The Smarties award, which is voted for by children, made the book well known within six months of publication, while most children's books have to wait for years. The following year, Philosopher's Stone won almost all the other major British awards that were decided by children. (Note: The Children's Book Award, The Young Telegraph Paperback of the Year Award, the Birmingham Cable Children's Book Award and the Sheffield Children's Book Award.) It was also shortlisted for children's books awards adjudicated by adults, but did not win. Sandra Beckett commented that books that were popular with children were regarded as undemanding and as not of the highest literary standards – for example, the literary establishment disdained the works of Dahl, an overwhelming favourite of children before the appearance of Rowling's books. In 2003, the novel was listed at number 22 on the BBC's survey The Big Read.

Harry Potter and the Philosopher's Stone won two publishing industry awards given for sales rather than literary merit, the British Book Awards Children's Book of the Year and the Booksellers' Association / Bookseller Author of the Year. By March 1999 UK editions had sold just over 300,000 copies and the story was still the UK's best-selling title in December 2001. A Braille edition was published in May 1998 by the Scottish Braille Press.

Platform 9 3/4, from which the Hogwarts Express left London, was commemorated in the real-life King's Cross railway station with a sign and a trolley apparently passing through the wall.

=== US publication and reception ===
UK to American translation examples
UK	American
mum, mam	mom
sherbet lemon	lemon drop
motorbike	motorcycle
chips	fries
crisp	chip
jelly	Jell-O
jacket potato	baked potato
jumper	sweater

Scholastic Corporation bought the US rights at the Bologna Book Fair in April 1997 for US$105,000, an unusually high sum for a children's book. Scholastic's Arthur Levine thought that "philosopher" sounded too archaic for readers and after some discussion (including the proposed title "Harry Potter and the School of Magic"), the American edition was published in September 1998 under the title Rowling suggested, Harry Potter and the Sorcerer's Stone. Rowling later said that she regretted this change and would have fought it if she had been in a stronger position at the time. Philip Nel has pointed out that the change lost the connection with alchemy and some other changes lost the meaning of other terms changed in translation, for example from "crumpet" to "muffin". While Rowling accepted the change from both the British English "mum" and Seamus Finnigan's Irish variant "mam" to the American variant "mom" in Harry Potter and the Sorcerer's Stone, she vetoed this change in the later books, which was then reversed in later editions of Philosopher's Stone. However, Nel considered that Scholastic's translations were considerably more sensitive than most of those imposed on British English books of the time and that some other changes could be regarded as useful copyedits. Since the UK editions of early titles in the series were published months prior to the American versions, some American readers became familiar with the British English versions owing to having bought them from online retailers.

At first the most prestigious reviewers ignored the book, leaving it to book trade and library publications such as Kirkus Reviews and Booklist, which examined it only by the entertainment-oriented criteria of children's fiction. However, more penetrating specialist reviews (such as one by Cooperative Children's Book Center Choices, which noted complexity, depth and consistency in the world that Rowling had built) attracted the attention of reviewers in major newspapers. Although The Boston Globe and Michael Winerip in The New York Times complained that the final chapters were the weakest part of the book, they and most other American reviewers gave glowing praise. A year later, the US edition was selected as an American Library Association Notable Book, a Publishers Weekly Best Book of 1998 and a New York Public Library 1998 Best Book of the Year and won Parenting Magazine's Book of the Year Award for 1998, the School Library Journal Best Book of the Year and the American Library Association Best Book for Young Adults. In 2012 it was ranked number 3 on a list of the top 100 children's novels published by School Library Journal.

In August 1999, Harry Potter and the Sorcerer's Stone topped the New York Times list of best-selling fiction and stayed near the top of the list for much of 1999 and 2000, until the New York Times split its list into children's and adult sections under pressure from other publishers who were eager to see their books given higher placings. Publishers Weekly's report in December 2001 on cumulative sales of children's fiction placed Harry Potter and the Sorcerer's Stone 19th among hardbacks (over 5 million copies) and 7th among paperbacks (over 6.6 million copies).

In May 2008, Scholastic announced the creation of a 10th Anniversary Edition of the book that was released on 1 October 2008 to mark the tenth anniversary of the original American release. For the fifteenth anniversary of the books, Scholastic re-released Sorcerer's Stone, along with the other six novels in the series, with new cover art by Kazu Kibuishi in 2013.

=== Translations ===
By mid-2008, official translations of the book had been published in 67 languages. By November 2017, the book had been translated into 80 languages, the 80th being Lowland Scots. In 2025, Rowling's website reported that the novel had been translated into 85 languages. Bloomsbury have published translations in Latin and in Ancient Greek, with the latter being described as "one of the most important pieces of Ancient Greek prose written in many centuries".

== Style and themes ==
Philip Nel has drawn attention to Jane Austen's influence on Rowling, whom Rowling has admired since the age of twelve. The styles of both novelists encourage rereading, as details that appear insignificant are discovered to foreshadow important events or characters much later in the story (for example, the brief mention of Sirius Black near the beginning of Harry Potter and the Philosopher's Stone foreshadows his importance as a major character in the third to fifth books). Like Austen's heroines, Harry often finds himself re-examining his beliefs as the books draw to a close. Also reminiscent of Austen is the lively social custom of the communal reading of letters. Furthermore, both authors satirise social behaviour and give characters names that reinforce their personalities. However, for Nel, one point of divergence between the two authors is that Rowling's humour tends towards caricature, with names resembling those found in the works of Charles Dickens. Amanda Cockrell further noted that Rowling's names invoke the dominant trait of their owners through allusions drawn from sources as varied as Roman mythology and eighteenth-century German literature. Rowling, like C. S. Lewis (author of the Narnia series), blurs the distinction between juvenile and adult fiction. Nel also noted that, like many good writers for children, Rowling combines several literary genres‍—‌fantasy, young adult fiction, boarding school stories, and Bildungsroman, among others.

Some reviewers compared Philosopher's Stone to the stories of Roald Dahl, who died in 1990. Many writers since the 1970s had been hailed as his successor, but none had attained anything near his popularity with children and, in a poll conducted shortly after the launch of Philosopher's Stone, seven of the ten most popular children's books were by Dahl, including the one in top place. The only other children's author of comparable popularity in the late 1990s was an American, R. L. Stine. Some of the story elements in Philosopher's Stone resembled parts of Dahl's stories. For example, the hero of James and the Giant Peach lost his parents and had to live with a pair of abusive aunts ‍—‌ one fat and one thin rather like Mr. and Mrs. Dursley, who treated Harry as a servant. However Harry Potter was a distinctive creation, able to take on the responsibilities of an adult while remaining a child inside.

Librarian Nancy Knapp and marketing professor Stephen Brown noted the liveliness and detail of descriptions, especially of shop scenes such as Diagon Alley. Tad Brennan commented that Rowling's writing resembles that of Homer: "rapid, plain, and direct in expression". Stephen King admired "the sort of playful details of which only British fantasists seem capable" and concluded that they worked because Rowling enjoys a quick giggle and then moves briskly forward.

Nicholas Tucker described the early Harry Potter books as looking back to Victorian and Edwardian children's stories: Hogwarts was an old-style boarding school in which the teachers addressed pupils formally by their surnames and were most concerned with the reputations of the houses with which they were associated; characters' personalities were plainly shown by their appearances, starting with the Dursleys; evil or malicious characters were to be crushed rather than reformed, including Argus Filch's cat Mrs Norris; and the hero, a mistreated orphan who found his true place in life, was charismatic and good at sports, but considerate and protective towards the weak. Several other commentators have noted that the books present a rigidly stratified society and include many social stereotypes. However, Karin Westerman drew parallels with 1990s Britain: a class system that was breaking down but defended by those whose power and status it upheld; the multi-ethnic composition of Hogwarts' students; the racial tensions between the various intelligent species; and school bullying.

Susan Hall wrote that there is no rule of law in the books, as the actions of Ministry of Magic officials are unconstrained by laws, accountability or any kind of legal challenge. This provides Voldemort an opportunity to offer his own horrific version of order. As a side-effect, Harry and Hermione, who were brought up in the rigidly regulated Muggle world, find solutions by thinking in ways unfamiliar to wizards. For example, Hermione notes that one obstacle to finding the Philosopher's Stone is a test of logic rather than magical power, and that most wizards have no chance of solving it.

Nel suggested that the unflattering characterisation of the dully conventional, status-conscious, materialistic Dursleys was Rowling's reaction to the family policies of the British government in the early 1990s, which treated the married heterosexual couple as the "preferred norm", at a time when the author was a single mother. Harry's relationships with adult and juvenile wizards spring from affection and loyalty. This is evident from his pleasure in being an occasional temporary member of the Weasley family, and in his treatment of first Rubeus Hagrid and later Remus Lupin and Sirius Black as father-figures.

== Legacy ==
=== Sequels ===
The second book, Harry Potter and the Chamber of Secrets, was originally published in the UK on 2 July 1998 and later, in the US on 2 June 1999. Harry Potter and the Prisoner of Azkaban was then published a year later in the UK on 8 July 1999 and in the US on 8 September 1999. Harry Potter and the Goblet of Fire was published on 8 July 2000 at the same time by Bloomsbury and Scholastic. Harry Potter and the Order of the Phoenix is the longest book in the series at 766 pages in the UK version and 870 pages in the US version. It was published worldwide in English on 21 June 2003. Harry Potter and the Half-Blood Prince was published on 16 July 2005 and sold 11 million copies in the first 24 hours of its worldwide release. The seventh and final novel, Harry Potter and the Deathly Hallows, was published on 21 July 2007. The book sold 11 million copies within 24 hours of its release: 2.7 million copies in the UK and 8.3 million in the US.

=== Illustrated version ===
An illustrated version of Harry Potter and the Philosopher's Stone was released on 6 October 2015, with illustrations by Jim Kay. The book carries over 100 illustrations and will be followed by illustrated versions of all seven books from the series by the same artist.

=== Audio books ===
On 20 November 2015, Harry Potter and the Philosopher's Stone was released in audio book format simultaneously, both in the UK and the US by Pottermore Publishing. The UK edition is narrated by Stephen Fry and the US edition is narrated by Jim Dale. On 4 November 2025, Harry Potter and the Philosopher's Stone was released as a full-cast audio edition internationally by Pottermore Publishing and Amazon's subsidiary, Audible.

=== Podcast version ===
In May 2020, a reading podcast by Spotify was created and entitled Harry Potter at Home: Readings. Each chapter is narrated by a celebrity guest from the Harry Potter and Wizarding World franchises.

Chapter	Title	Release date	Runtime	Narrated by
1	The Boy Who Lived	5 May 2020	25 mins, 54 secs	Daniel Radcliffe
2	The Vanishing Glass	8 May 2020	27 mins, 27 secs	Noma Dumezweni
3	The Letters from No One	12 May 2020	26 mins, 14 secs	Eddie Redmayne
4	The Keeper of the Keys	14 May 2020	26 mins, 54 secs	Stephen Fry
5	Diagon Alley	19 May 2020	48 mins, 1 sec	Simon Callow, Bonnie Wright and Evanna Lynch
6	The Journey from Platform Nine and Three-Quarters	20 May 2020	41 mins, 47 secs	Jamie Parker and cast of Harry Potter and the Cursed Child
7	The Sorting Hat	27 May 2020	27 mins, 1 sec	Olivia Colman, Jonathan Van Ness and Kate McKinnon
8	The Potions Master	28 May 2020	18 mins, 36 secs	Alia Bhatt, Alec Baldwin and Carmen Baldwin
9	Midnight Duel	3 June 2020	33 mins, 21 secs	Alison Sudol and Dan Fogler
10	Hallowe'en	4 June 2020	29 mins, 06 secs	Whoopi Goldberg
11	Quidditch	10 June 2020	22 mins, 27 secs	David Tennant and David Beckham
12	The Mirror of Erised	3 July 2020	39 mins, 14 secs	Matthew Lewis, Helen Howard and Imelda Staunton
13	Nicolas Flamel	7 July 2020	22 mins, 2 secs	Hugh Bonneville
14	Norbert the Norwegian Ridgeback	8 July 2020	26 mins, 6 secs	Jason Isaacs, Tom Felton and Helen McCrory
15	The Forbidden Forest	13 July 2020	33 mins, 3 secs	Claudia Kim and Dakota Fanning
16	Through the Trapdoor	14 July 2020	51 mins, 35 secs	Kenneth Branagh, Ruth Wilson and Helena Bonham Carter
17	The Man with the Two Faces	16 July 2020	41 mins, 29 secs	Three families of Harry Potter fans, with a surprise appearance from J. K. Rowling

=== Film adaptation ===
In 1999, Rowling sold the film rights of the first two Harry Potter books to Warner Bros. for a reported £1 million. Rowling demanded that the principal cast be kept strictly British, but allowed for the casting of Irish actors such as Richard Harris as Dumbledore and of foreign actors as characters of the same nationalities in later books. After extensive casting, filming began in September 2000 at Leavesden Film Studios and in London, with production ending in July 2001. Harry Potter and the Philosopher's Stone was released in London on 14 November 2001. Reviewers' comments were positive, as reflected by an 81% Fresh rating on Rotten Tomatoes and by a score of 65% at Metacritic, representing "generally favourable reviews".

=== Video games ===
Five independent video games by different developers were released between 2001 and 2003 by Electronic Arts, that were loosely based on the film and book:

Developer	Release date	Platform	Genre	GameRankings	Metacritic	Notes
KnowWonder	15 November 2001	Microsoft Windows	Adventure/puzzle	67.35%	65/100	
Argonaut	15 November 2001	PlayStation	Action-adventure	66.98%	64/100	
Griptonite	15 November 2001	Game Boy Color	Role-playing game	73%	—N/a	
Griptonite	15 November 2001	Game Boy Advance	Action puzzle	68.37%	64/100	
Aspyr	28 February 2002	Mac OS X	Adventure/puzzle	—N/a	—N/a	Port of Windows version
Warthog	9 December 2003	GameCube	Action-adventure	63.31%	62/100	
Warthog	9 December 2003	PlayStation 2	Action-adventure	57.90%	56/100	
Warthog	9 December 2003	Xbox	Action-adventure	61.82%	59/100	

=== Uses in education and business ===
Writers on education and business subjects have used the book as an object lesson. Writing about clinical teaching in medical schools, Jennifer Conn contrasted Snape's technical expertise with his intimidating behaviour towards students. Quidditch coach Madam Hooch on the other hand illustrated useful techniques in the teaching of physical skills, including breaking down complex actions into sequences of simple ones and helping students to avoid common errors. Joyce Fields wrote that the books illustrate four of the five main topics in a typical first-year sociology class: "sociological concepts including culture, society, and socialisation; stratification and social inequality; social institutions; and social theory".

Stephen Brown noted that the early Harry Potter books, especially Harry Potter and the Philosopher's Stone, were a runaway success despite inadequate and poorly organised marketing. Brown advised marketing executives to be less preoccupied with rigorous statistical analyses and the "analysis, planning, implementation, and control" model of management. Instead he recommended that they should treat the stories as "a marketing masterclass", full of enticing products and brand names. For example, a real-world analogue of Bertie Bott's Every Flavour Beans was introduced under licence in 2000 by toymaker Hasbro.

== Release history ==
Country	Release date	Edition (Hardback/Paperback)	Publisher	Pages
United Kingdom	26 June 1997	Hardback Children's Edition	Bloomsbury	223
United Kingdom	26 June 1997	Paperback Children's Edition	Bloomsbury	223
United Kingdom	11 September 1998	Paperback Adult Edition (Original)	Bloomsbury	223
United Kingdom	27 September 1999	Hardback Signature Special Edition	Bloomsbury	223
United Kingdom	8 October 2001	Paperback Special Edition	Bloomsbury	223
United Kingdom	10 July 2004	Hardback Adult Edition (Re-issue with new cover)	Bloomsbury	336
United Kingdom	4 October 2004	Paperback Adult Edition (Re-issue with new cover)	Bloomsbury	223
United Kingdom	1 November 2010	Paperback Harry Potter Signature Edition	Bloomsbury	223
United Kingdom	18 July 2013	Paperback Adult Edition (Re-issue with new cover)	Bloomsbury	223
United Kingdom	1 September 2014	Hardcover Children's Edition (Re-issue with new cover)	Bloomsbury	352
United Kingdom	1 September 2014	Paperback Children's Edition (Re-issue with new cover)	Bloomsbury	352
United Kingdom	6 October 2015	Hardcover Illustrated Edition (Illustrated by Jim Kay)	Bloomsbury	256
United Kingdom	20 October 2020	MinaLima Edition	Bloomsbury	368
United Kingdom	9 June 2022	Hardcover Children's Edition (25th Anniversary Edition)	Bloomsbury	352
United States	1 September 1998	Hardback	Arthur A. Levine/ Scholastic	309
United States	8 September 1999	Paperback	Arthur A. Levine/ Scholastic	309
United States	1 November 2000	Hardback Collector's Edition	Arthur A. Levine/ Scholastic	309
United States	1 November 2001	Mass Market Paperback	Arthur A. Levine/ Scholastic	400
United States	September 2008	Paperback (Exclusive Scholastic School Market Edition)	Arthur A. Levine/ Scholastic	309
United States	1 October 2008	Hardback 10th Anniversary Edition	Arthur A. Levine/ Scholastic	309
United States	27 August 2013	Paperback (Re-issue with new cover)	Arthur A. Levine/ Scholastic	336
United States	6 October 2015	Hardcover Illustrated Edition (Illustrated by Jim Kay)	Arthur A. Levine/ Scholastic	256
United States	20 October 2020	MinaLima Edition	Arthur A. Levine/ Scholastic	368
Canada	1 December 1998	Hardback Children's Edition	Raincoast	223
Canada	1 December 1998	Paperback Adult Edition (Original)	Raincoast	223
Canada	1 November 1999	Hardback Signature Special Edition	Raincoast	223
Canada	31 August 2000	Paperback Children's Edition	Raincoast	223
Canada	16 October 2002	Paperback Magic Edition	Raincoast	223
Canada	4 October 2004	Hardback Adult Edition (Re-issue with new cover)	Raincoast	336
Canada	12 January 2011	Paperback Adult Edition (Re-issue with new cover)	Bloomsbury	223
Canada	12 January 2011	Paperback Harry Potter Signature Edition	Bloomsbury	223
Canada	27 August 2013	Paperback Adult Edition (Re-issue with new cover)	Bloomsbury	223

== Works cited ==
- Gunelius, Susan (2008). Harry Potter: The Story of a Global Business Phenomenon. Palgrave Macmillan. doi:10.1057/9780230594104. ISBN 978-0-230-59410-4.
- Smith, Sean (2002). J.K. Rowling: A Biography. Arrow Books. ISBN 978-0-09-944542-5.
