= Hermione Granger =

Fictional character from the Harry Potter literature series

- Harry Potter character
- Emma Watson as Hermione Granger (Note: Promotional image for Harry Potter and the Order of the Phoenix (2007))
- First appearance: Harry Potter and the Philosopher's Stone (1997)
- Created by: J. K. Rowling
- Portrayed by: Emma Watson (films); Arabella Stanton (television series)
- Voiced by: Jessie Braviner (Note: Harry Potter for Kinect); Melissa Hutchison (Note: Lego Dimensions); Alice Keenan (Note: Harry Potter and the Deathly Hallows – Part 1 (video game) Harry Potter and the Deathly Hallows – Part 2 (video game)); Erica Luttrell (Note: Harry Potter: Wizards Unite); Harper Marshall (Note: Various video games); Rachel Sternberg (Note: Harry Potter and the Half-Blood Prince (video game))

In-universe information
- Full name: Hermione Jean Granger
- Spouse: Ron Weasley
- Children: Rose Granger-Weasley; Hugo Granger-Weasley
- Nationality: British
- House: Gryffindor
- Born: 19 September 1979

Hermione Granger (Note: Pronunciation: /hɜːrˈmaɪəni ˈɡreɪndʒər/, hur-MY-ə-nee GRAYN-jər) is a fictional character in the Harry Potter series of novels by J. K. Rowling. She first appeared in Harry Potter and the Philosopher's Stone (1997) as a first-year student on her way to Hogwarts, a school of magic. In the novel, she becomes friends with Harry Potter and Ron Weasley after they save her from a troll. Hermione often uses her quick wit, deft recall, and encyclopaedic knowledge to help her friends in perilous situations. Rowling has stated that Hermione resembles herself as a young girl.

Hermione is portrayed by Emma Watson in all eight Harry Potter films, and is set to be played by Arabella Stanton in the upcoming television series.

== Character ==
Rowling has described Hermione as a strong female character who is bright, logical, upright, and good. Rowling was seen as a "know-it-all" in her youth, and she said Hermione was an exaggerated version of her younger self. She says that beneath Hermione's studious and sometimes bossy exterior, she is insecure and afraid of failure, similar to Rowling as a young person. (Note: Attributed to multiple references:) Rowling said that to compensate for her feelings of inadequacy, Hermione strives to be the best at everything; she projects a confidence that irritates others. (Note: Attributed to multiple references:)

In the novels, Hermione is described as having bushy brown hair, brown eyes and large front teeth. She is described as an exceptionally talented witch, and Rowling has called her a "borderline genius". Watson said that girls in popular media tend to "dumb themselves down", but Hermione is not afraid to be clever, which makes her an exceptional role model for girls. Scholar Mary P. Freier has noted that, throughout the Harry Potter series, Hermione uses the skills of a librarian and researcher to gather the information needed to defeat Voldemort. Freier observes that Hermione begins the series as a child "who loves the library but cannot always use it effectively", relying on the Hogwarts school librarian for help. However, as the series progresses Hermione becomes a librarian herself, according to Freier. Rowling has called Hermione the perfect expository character due to her encyclopaedic knowledge of the wizarding world. Rowling has described Hermione's classmate Luna Lovegood as the "anti-Hermione" due to the differences between them.

Hermione's first name was derived from a character in William Shakespeare's The Winter's Tale, although according to Rowling the two characters have little in common. Hermione's middle name was originally Jane, but Rowling changed it to Jean so Hermione would not have the same middle name as Dolores Jane Umbridge. Rowling considered giving Hermione the surname "Puckle", but ultimately felt the name did not suit her.

Rowling said that Hermione's parents, two Muggle dentists, are somewhat bemused by their "odd" daughter, but are proud of her nonetheless; they are the type of people who would give their daughter an unusual name to prove their cleverness. Hermione is proud of her Muggle heritage and, according to Rowling, she works at the Ministry of Magic after graduation from Hogwarts, advocating for disenfranchised populations such as House-elves and Muggle-borns. Hermione's Patronus is an otter, which is Rowling's favourite animal.

== Appearances ==
=== Novels ===
==== Harry Potter and the Philosopher's Stone ====
Hermione is introduced in Harry Potter and the Philosopher's Stone (1997) when she meets Harry Potter and Ron Weasley on the Hogwarts Express. After mocking Ron for his inability to perform a spell, she proves her knowledge by declaring that she has memorized all their school textbooks. At Hogwarts, Hermione annoys other students with her vast knowledge, and Harry and Ron consider her arrogant. They heartily dislike her until they rescue her from a troll; she is so thankful that she lies to protect them from punishment, thus winning their friendship. Later, Hermione's knack for logic and her penchant for library research aid the trio in their quest to locate a magical object known as the Philosopher's Stone. On their way to the Stone, Hermione solves a puzzle and defeats the dangerous Devil's Snare plant.

Rowling said she resisted requests by her editor to remove the troll scene. She explained that due to Hermione's arrogance and irritating personality during the beginning of the first novel, something "huge" was needed to catalyze her friendship with Harry and Ron.

==== Harry Potter and the Chamber of Secrets ====
In Harry Potter and the Chamber of Secrets (1998), Hermione develops a liking for Gilderoy Lockhart, the new Defence Against the Dark Arts professor. During a confrontation between the Gryffindor and Slytherin Quidditch teams, a brawl nearly ensues after Draco Malfoy calls her a "Mudblood", an insulting term for a Muggle-born wizard. Hermione concocts a Polyjuice Potion so she, Harry and Ron can infiltrate the Slytherin dormitory and collect information about the Heir of Slytherin. The boys drink the potion and take on the appearance of Malfoy's friends, but Hermione, having used a cat hair in her vial of potion, ends up looking like a cat and cannot join the mission. When a basilisk escapes from the Chamber of Secrets, Hermione successfully identifies it through library research, but is Petrified by its reflection. Though she lies incapacitated in the hospital wing, the information she found aids Harry and Ron in their quest to solve the mystery of the Chamber. Hermione is revived after Harry kills the basilisk, but is distraught to learn that all end-of-year exams have been cancelled.

==== Harry Potter and the Prisoner of Azkaban ====
In Harry Potter and the Prisoner of Azkaban (1999), Hermione buys a cat named Crookshanks, who takes to chasing Ron's pet rat, Scabbers. Before the start of term, McGonagall secretly gives Hermione a Time-Turner, a device which lets her travel through time to handle her busy class schedule. During the school year, tension arises between Hermione and her two best friends. Harry becomes furious with her because she told McGonagall that he got a Firebolt racing broom, which was then confiscated to be inspected for traces of dark magic. Ron is angry at her because he believes Crookshanks was responsible for Scabbers' disappearance, although Hermione maintains that Crookshanks is not to blame. Later, Hermione uses the Time-Turner to help Harry rescue Sirius Black and the hippogriff Buckbeak.

==== Harry Potter and the Goblet of Fire ====
Hermione is disturbed by the way house-elves are treated in Harry Potter and the Goblet of Fire (2000). She establishes the Society for the Promotion of Elfish Welfare (SPEW) to lobby for their rights. When students from other schools of magic visit Hogwarts for the Triwizard Tournament, Hermione is asked to the Yule Ball by the Bulgarian Quidditch star Viktor Krum of Durmstrang. She later gets into a heated argument with Ron after he accuses her of "fraternising with the enemy". She supports Harry throughout the Triwizard Tournament, helping him prepare for each task. After the second task, Krum asks her to visit him in Bulgaria over the summer, but she politely declines. Near the end of the term, Hermione takes action against Rita Skeeter, a tabloid journalist and unregistered Animagus who published defamatory material about Hermione, Harry, and Hagrid.

==== Harry Potter and the Order of the Phoenix ====
In Harry Potter and the Order of the Phoenix (2003), Hermione becomes a Gryffindor prefect. Her new friendship with Luna Lovegood has a rocky start after Hermione criticises The Quibbler, a periodical published by Luna's father. When the Daily Prophet alleges that Harry fabricated the story of Voldemort's return, Hermione defends Harry to fellow students. She also bickers frequently with Ron. After the Ministry of Magic decrees that Hogwarts students will not be taught practical defensive magic, Hermione proposes that Harry should instruct students in defensive spells. Many students are interested in the secret practice group, which they call Dumbledore's Army. Near the end of the novel, Hermione is involved in a battle at the Department of Mysteries. She is seriously injured by the Death Eater Antonin Dolohov, but makes a full recovery.

==== Harry Potter and the Half-Blood Prince ====
The new Potions professor Horace Slughorn invites Hermione to join his exclusive "Slug Club" in Harry Potter and the Half-Blood Prince (2005). During tryouts for the Gryffindor Quidditch team, Hermione helps Ron retain his position as keeper by sabotaging his rival, Cormac McLaggen. Hermione's romantic feelings for Ron continue to grow, and she invites him to Slughorn's Christmas party. Ron, however, has become romantically involved with Lavender Brown. Hermione feuds with Ron until he suffers a near-fatal poisoning, which frightens her enough to reconcile with him. After Dumbledore's death, Hermione and Ron both vow to stay by Harry's side regardless of what happens.

==== Harry Potter and the Deathly Hallows ====
Hermione accompanies Harry and Ron on the quest to destroy Voldemort's remaining Horcruxes in Harry Potter and the Deathly Hallows (2007). Before leaving home, she ensures the safety of her parents by placing a false memory charm on them, which causes them to believe they are Wendell and Monica Wilkins. She prepares for their journey by filling an enchanted purse with things they will need. She also inherits Dumbledore's copy of The Tales of Beedle the Bard, which allows her to discover secrets about the Deathly Hallows. When Hermione and Harry encounter Voldemort and his snake Nagini in Godric's Hollow, Hermione casts a spell which saves her and Harry but which breaks Harry's wand.

When Hermione, Harry and Ron are caught by Snatchers, Hermione temporarily conceals Harry's identity by disfiguring his face with a Stinging Jinx. She tries to pass herself off as a half-blood to avoid persecution, but she and her friends are recognised and taken to Malfoy Manor. Bellatrix Lestrange tortures Hermione with the Cruciatus Curse and demands to know how the trio obtained the Sword of Gryffindor. Hermione, Harry, Ron and the other prisoners being held in Malfoy Manor are eventually rescued by the house-elf Dobby. Later, Hermione impersonates Bellatrix using Polyjuice Potion in order to steal a Horcrux from Gringotts. She, Harry, and Ron fight in the Battle of Hogwarts, during which Hermione destroys the Horcrux with a basilisk fang. Hermione and Ron share their first kiss during the battle.

In the novel's epilogue, which is set nineteen years after Voldemort's death, Hermione and Ron are sending their daughter Rose Granger-Weasley off to her first year at Hogwarts. They also have a younger son named Hugo. Although the epilogue does not state that Hermione and Ron are married, news articles published after the release of Deathly Hallows refer to Hermione as Ron's wife. (Note: Attributed to multiple references:)

=== Film adaptations ===
Emma Watson portrays Hermione in all eight of the Harry Potter film adaptations. Casting agents for the first film, Harry Potter and the Philosopher's Stone (2001), found the nine-year-old Watson through her Oxford theatre teacher. Watson had acted in school plays, but had no film acting experience. (Note: Attributed to multiple references:) Although Watson had to audition a total of eight times before earning the role, J. K. Rowling supported her casting after her first screen test. Prior to casting Watson, the filmmakers considered Hatty Jones for the role.

During the early part of her career playing Hermione, Watson would get upset when the filmmakers tried to make her look "geeky" for the role, but she eventually came to enjoy it. As a girl, Watson has felt pressure to be beautiful, and she felt relieved that Hermione "doesn't care what she looks like." For Philosopher's Stone, Watson wore large fake teeth for one scene, but did not wear them for subsequent films because they made it difficult to speak. (Note: In the fourth novel, Hermione's larger-than-average teeth are shrunk to a smaller size by magic.)

While filming Order of the Phoenix (2007), Watson was uncertain about returning for the next film. She cited the long production schedule, attention from the public and a "lack of freedom" as reasons for not reprising her role. She eventually decided to return, saying that she could not bear to see anyone else play Hermione. Steve Kloves, who wrote the screenplay adaptations for seven of the eight films, revealed in a 2003 interview that Hermione is his favourite Harry Potter character. He said, "There's something about her fierce intellect coupled with a complete lack of understanding of how she affects people ... that I just find charming and irresistible to write."

=== Theatre ===
Hermione appears in Harry Potter and the Cursed Child, a 2016 play written by Jack Thorne from a story by Thorne, J. K. Rowling and John Tiffany. In the play, which takes place nineteen years after the events of Deathly Hallows, Hermione is the Minister for Magic. She has been portrayed on stage by the Eswatini-born actress Noma Dumezweni, known for her performances in Linda, A Raisin in the Sun and A Human Being Died That Night. Dumezweni said that playing the role was a privilege and a responsibility. The casting of a black actress led to criticism on social media, which Rowling dismissed as racism. She asserted that the novels never explicitly establish Hermione's race or skin colour. Dumezweni called the backlash "unimaginative" and said that many actors are glad she is portraying Hermione because it allows them to see a version of themselves on stage. The Independent praised the performance of Dumezweni, who received the 2017 Laurence Olivier Award for Best Actress in a Supporting Role for her portrayal of Hermione.

== Reception and impact ==
In the book The Ivory Tower and Harry Potter, Eliza T. Dresang discusses Hermione's role in the series and its relationship to feminist debates. Dresang begins with an analysis of Hermione's name and the role of previous characters with the same name in mythology and fiction, and the heritage Hermione has inherited from these characters due to her name. Dresang notes the parallels between Hermione and Rowling, and asserts that Hermione's "compulsion for study" helps both the character's development, making Hermione "a prime example that information brings power", and the plot of the series, as her knowledge of the wizarding world is often used to "save the day". Dresang states that "Harry and Ron are more dependent on Hermione than she is on them." However, she adds that the frequency of Hermione's crying and hysteria is not believable based on her character, and is "quite out of line with her core role in the book."

In his review of the film adaptation of Philosopher's Stone, Brian Linder of IGN offered high praise to Watson, saying that she "steals the show." In another IGN article, Linder and Steve Head praised Watson's "cute and astute" portrayal of Hermione. The Daily Telegraph called Watson's performance admirable. Watson was nominated for five awards for her performance in Philosopher's Stone, winning the Young Artist Award for Leading Young Actress. She was also chosen as a 2001 Breakout Performer by Entertainment Weekly. Watson's version of the character was voted the best female film character of all time in a 2016 poll of Hollywood professionals conducted by The Hollywood Reporter.

Philip Nel of Kansas State University notes that Rowling, who worked for Amnesty International, "evokes her social activism through Hermione's passion for oppressed elves". The scholar Brycchan Carey has praised the books' abolitionist sentiments, and views Hermione's Society for the Promotion of Elfish Welfare as a model for young readers' political engagement.

Following the release of the final novel, Rowland Manthorpe of The Guardian felt that Hermione had failed to develop into a fully-fledged character, and remained a sensible and "swottish" caricature.

Hermione is the focus of the fan-created web-series Hermione Granger and the Quarter Life Crisis.

== Sources ==
- Horne, Jackie C. (2010). "Harry and the other: answering the race question in J. K. Rowling's Harry Potter". The Lion and the Unicorn. 34 (1): 76–104. doi:10.1353/uni.0.0488. ISSN 0147-2593. S2CID 143738308. ProQuest 221753179.
- Rowling, J. K. (1997). Harry Potter and the Philosopher's Stone. Bloomsbury. ISBN 0747532699.
- Rowling, J. K. (1998). Harry Potter and the Chamber of Secrets. Bloomsbury. ISBN 0747538492.
- Rowling, J. K. (1999). Harry Potter and the Prisoner of Azkaban. Bloomsbury. ISBN 0747542155.
- Rowling, J. K. (2000). Harry Potter and the Goblet of Fire. Bloomsbury. ISBN 074754624X.
- Rowling, J. K. (2003). Harry Potter and the Order of the Phoenix. Bloomsbury. ISBN 0747551006.
- Rowling, J. K. (2005). Harry Potter and the Half-Blood Prince. Bloomsbury. ISBN 0747581088.
- Rowling, J. K. (2007). Harry Potter and the Deathly Hallows. Bloomsbury. ISBN 1551929767.
- Carey, Brycchan (2003). "Hermione and the house-elves: the literary and historical contexts of J. K. Rowling's antislavery campaign". In Anatol, Giselle Liza (ed.). Reading Harry Potter: Critical Essays. Praeger. ISBN 9780313320675.
