= Fantastic Beasts =

Fantasy film series; prequel to the Harry Potter series

- Fantastic Beasts logo as used in the films
- Directed by: David Yates
- Written by: J. K. Rowling (1–3); Steve Kloves (3)
- Produced by: David Heyman; J. K. Rowling; Steve Kloves; Lionel Wigram; Tim Lewis (3)
- Starring: Eddie Redmayne; Katherine Waterston; Dan Fogler; Alison Sudol; Ezra Miller; (See below)
- Cinematography: Philippe Rousselot (1–2); George Richmond (3)
- Edited by: Mark Day
- Music by: James Newton Howard
- Production company: Heyday Films
- Distributed by: Warner Bros. Pictures
- Release dates: 18 November 2016 (1); 16 November 2018 (2); 15 April 2022 (3)
- Countries: United Kingdom; United States
- Language: English
- Budget: Total (3 films) $575 million
- Box office: Total (3 films) $1.865 billion

Fantastic Beasts is a film series directed by David Yates and a spin-off prequel to the Harry Potter novel and film series. The series is distributed by Warner Bros. Pictures and consists of three fantasy films, beginning with Fantastic Beasts and Where to Find Them (2016), and following with Fantastic Beasts: The Crimes of Grindelwald (2018) and Fantastic Beasts: The Secrets of Dumbledore (2022). Following the 2001–11 film series directly adapting the Harry Potter books, Fantastic Beasts is the second film series in the Wizarding World shared universe media franchise.

Rowling wrote the original screenplays for each film, with Steve Kloves, a writer on the Harry Potter series, returning to rewrite parts of the third film. The main story arc following Albus Dumbledore and his agents' quest—principally, Newt Scamander during his magical creature-saving safaris—to overcome Gellert Grindelwald, his lost love, as the First Wizarding War and Second World War approach.

It stars Eddie Redmayne as the protagonist Newt Scamander, with Jude Law portraying Albus Dumbledore, and Colin Farrell, Johnny Depp, and Mads Mikkelsen all portraying the third leading character, antagonist Gellert Grindelwald. Also starring are Ezra Miller, Katherine Waterston, Alison Sudol, Dan Fogler, Victoria Yeates, Jessica Williams, Callum Turner, and Richard Coyle.

Production of the series was led by David Heyman of Heyday Films and lasted over six years. The Fantastic Beasts series has been commercially successful, having collectively grossed over US$1.8 billion across three films, three times more than the budgeted costs. The first film received positive reviews while the later two films received mixed reviews. Some critics deemed the series overall to be inferior to the Harry Potter films.

== Origins ==
On 12 September 2013, two years following the conclusion of the Harry Potter film series with Harry Potter and the Deathly Hallows – Part 2, Warner Bros. announced an attempt to expand the fictional universe of Harry Potter into a "Wizarding World", with J. K. Rowling developing a script for a prequel film, titled after a "textbook" Rowling had written in 2001 to be sold to raise money for the British charity Comic Relief, based on the in-universe textbook of the same name from her Harry Potter novel series. Set seventy years before the adventures of Harry Potter and following the adventures of its fictional author Newt Scamander, the film would mark both Rowling's screenwriting debut and the first intended instalment in a new series, tentatively entitled Fantastic Beasts. According to Rowling, after Warner Bros. suggested an adaptation of either Fantastic Beasts or Quidditch Through the Ages, she wrote a rough draft of the script in twelve days. She said, "It wasn't a great draft but it did show the shape of how it might look. So that is how it all started." In March 2014, it was announced that a trilogy was scheduled with the first instalment set in New York, and seeing the return of producer David Heyman, as well as writer Steve Kloves, both veterans of the Potter film series.

== Production ==
Film	Release date	Directed by	Screenplay by	Produced by
Fantastic Beasts and Where to Find Them	18 November 2016	David Yates	J. K. Rowling	David Heyman, J. K. Rowling, Steve Kloves & Lionel Wigram
Fantastic Beasts: The Crimes of Grindelwald	16 November 2018	David Yates	J. K. Rowling	David Heyman, J. K. Rowling, Steve Kloves & Lionel Wigram
Fantastic Beasts: The Secrets of Dumbledore	15 April 2022	David Yates	J. K. Rowling & Steve Kloves	David Heyman, J. K. Rowling, Steve Kloves, Lionel Wigram & Tim Lewis

In June 2015 Eddie Redmayne was cast in the lead role of Newt Scamander, the Wizarding World's preeminent magizoologist. Other cast members include: Katherine Waterston as Tina Goldstein, Alison Sudol as Queenie Goldstein, Dan Fogler as Jacob Kowalski, Ezra Miller as Credence Barebone, Samantha Morton as Mary Lou, Jenn Murray as Chastity Barebone, Faith Wood-Blagrove as Modesty Barebone, and Colin Farrell as Percival Graves / Gellert Grindelwald. Principal photography began in August 2015, at Warner Bros. Studios, Leavesden. After two months, the production moved to St George's Hall in Liverpool, which was transformed into 1920s New York City. Fantastic Beasts and Where to Find Them was released worldwide on 18 November 2016.

The second film was announced in March 2014. In October 2016, it was revealed that Yates and Rowling would return as director, and screenwriter and co-producer, and Redmayne would be returning to play the lead role of Newt Scamander in all the series' films. In November 2016, it was confirmed that Johnny Depp would have a starring role in the sequel, reprising his cameo role as Gellert Grindelwald from the first instalment, replacing Farrell. Later that same month, it was also announced that Albus Dumbledore would be appearing in future instalments, albeit with a younger actor for the prequel film series, intended to eventually replace Redmayne's Scamander as protagonist of the series. In April 2017, it was confirmed that Jude Law had been cast as Dumbledore with the film being short and set in New York City, Britain, and Paris. Principal photography began on 3 July 2017, at Warner Bros. Studios, Leavesden, and wrapped on 20 December 2017, with Fantastic Beasts: The Crimes of Grindelwald releasing on 16 November 2018.

Originally scheduled to begin filming in July 2019, and released in November 2020, production of the third film was pushed back to late 2019 to allow more time polishing the script and re-plan the future of the Fantastic Beasts series. In 2018 on Twitter, Rowling promised that the third film would give answers to the questions left unsolved in the first two. In October 2019, Dan Fogler claimed that principal photography on the third film would begin in February 2020. In November 2019, it was announced that the script had been written by both Rowling and Steve Kloves, the latter of whom returned after being absent as a writer on the first two. On 16 March 2020, the very day that principal photography would begin, the COVID-19 epidemic prompted Warner Bros to postpone production of its third Fantastic Beasts film. This postponed the film again, from a 12 November 2021 to a 15 July 2022 release. On 20 August 2020, filming was confirmed to start in September. In September 2020, Eddie Redmayne confirmed that filming was two weeks underway with safety precautions in place to keep the cast and crew safe from COVID-19. On 6 November 2020, Johnny Depp informed that Warner Bros. asked him to step down as Grindelwald; after shooting three scenes for the film, due to negative publicity resulting from the libel case Depp v News Group Newspapers Ltd, and he respected and agreed to the request. In November 2020, it was announced that Mads Mikkelsen would replace Depp in the role of Grindelwald. On 3 February 2021, filming in the UK was shut down after a production member tested positive for COVID-19. Composer James Newton Howard confirmed later that month that production had wrapped filming. In September 2021, the film's release was pushed forward three months to 15 April 2022, alongside the announcement of the full title: Fantastic Beasts: The Secrets of Dumbledore. It premiered one week early in a few European and Asian countries.

== Films ==
=== Fantastic Beasts and Where to Find Them (2016) ===
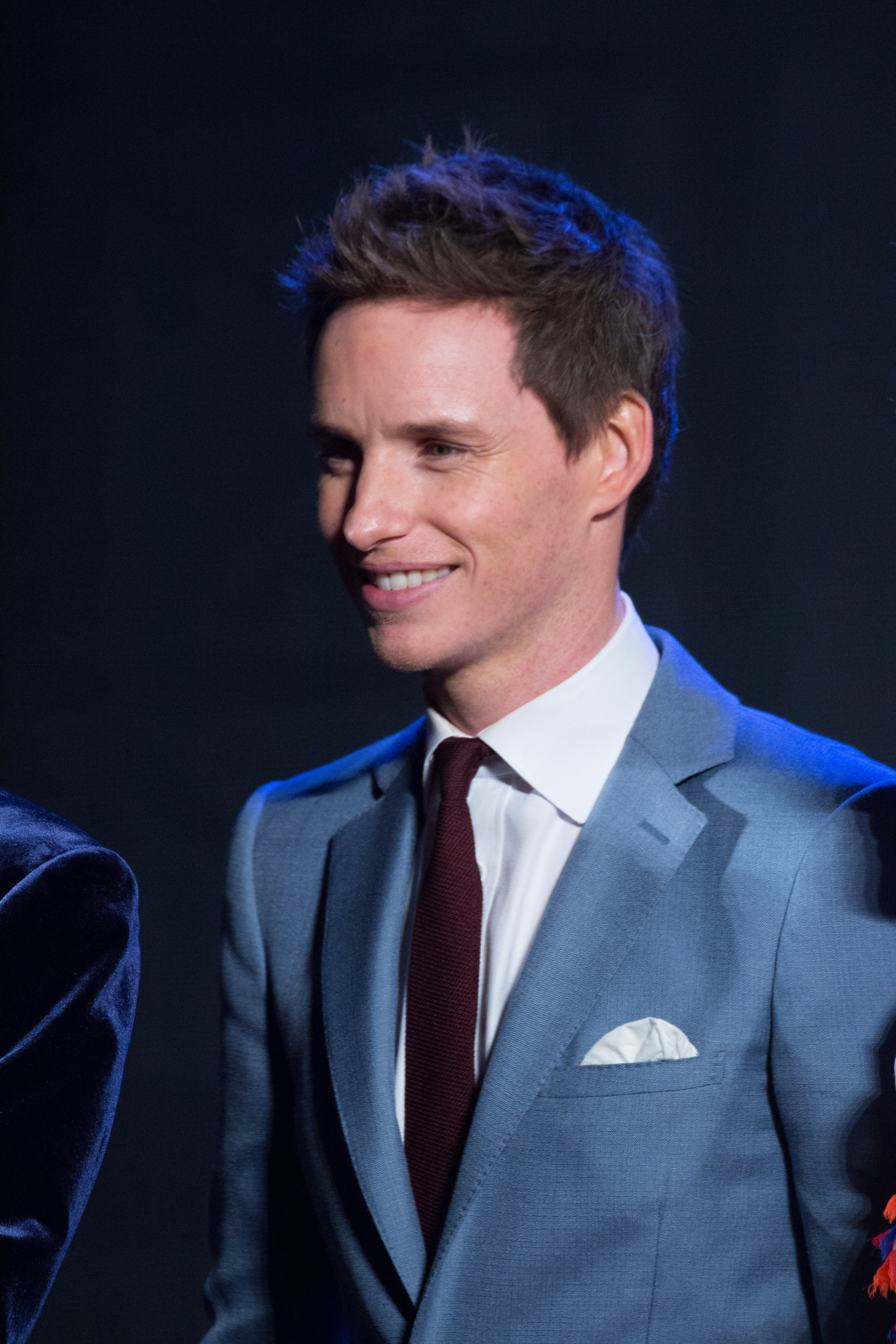
Eddie Redmayne at the Red Carpet Japan Premiere of Fantastic Beasts and Where to Find Them

In 1926, Newt Scamander arrives in New York City with his magically expanded briefcase which houses a number of dangerous creatures and their habitats. When some creatures escape from his briefcase, Newt must battle to correct the mistake, and the horrors of the resultant increase in violence, fear, and tension felt between magical and non-magical people (No-Maj).

=== Fantastic Beasts: The Crimes of Grindelwald (2018) ===
Several months after the events of Fantastic Beasts and Where to Find Them, Gellert Grindelwald has escaped imprisonment and has begun gathering followers to his cause—elevating wizards above all non-magical beings. Dumbledore must seek help from his former student Newt to put a stop to Grindelwald.

=== Fantastic Beasts: The Secrets of Dumbledore (2022) ===
The story is set five years after the events of The Crimes of Grindelwald, and takes place in the UK, the U.S. and China, with partial settings in Berlin and Bhutan, leading up to the Wizarding World's involvement in World War II. Newt Scamander and his company continue their quest to defeat Grindelwald, despite Albus Dumbledore being unable to fight against him.

=== Scrapped films ===
In October 2016, Rowling announced that the Fantastic Beasts film series would be composed of five films, later confirming that the series would cover the years from 1926 to 1945. In February 2022, producer David Heyman revealed that work on the script for Fantastic Beasts 4 had not yet begun. In April 2022, Variety reported that Warner Bros greenlighting the final two instalments would be dependent on the critical and commercial performance of The Secrets of Dumbledore. Mads Mikkelsen believed that Johnny Depp could return as Grindelwald in another film.

In November 2022, Variety reported that Warner Bros. Discovery had no Wizarding World films in active development and was not in "active discussions" with Rowling regarding the future of the franchise, leaving the future of the Fantastic Beasts series in limbo. In October 2023, director David Yates made comments that the series had been "parked" following the third film. He also disclosed that the idea of it being a five-film series had been a "surprise" after many had only initially committed to doing a single film. In October 2024, Redmayne said that the third film will probably have been the final time fans will have seen Newt Scamander on the big screen adding, "And that’s as far as I know. I mean, you'd have to speak to the people at Warner Bros. and J. K. Rowling, but as far as I know, that's it. I think he may come back in a glimpse in the Universal world in Florida that they're opening up, in which you may catch a glimpse of what he was up to in Paris." During the same month, Law also said in an interview that he did not see another film being made commenting, "I know it's certainly on hold. My guess would be that, now that they're doing 'Harry Potter' as a TV show, they'll probably put their energy into that. I certainly haven't heard that there's anything on the horizon."

== Television ==
In January 2021, it was reported that Warner Bros. were reviewing pitches for a television series, set in the Wizarding World, to debut on HBO Max. In May 2022, the reports circulated about the announced meeting between Warner Bros. Discovery CEO David Zaslav and J. K. Rowling in their discussion for future HBO Max projects set within the Wizarding World.

=== Fantastic Beasts: A Natural History ===
Fantastic Beasts: A Natural History is a documentary film that was broadcast on BBC One on 27 February 2022. Presented by Stephen Fry, the documentary tells magical stories about mythical creatures and beasts from J. K. Rowling's works, and their connection to real-life animals.

== Short film ==
Fantastic Beasts of the TSA, a late night talk show sketch, aired on The Late Late Show with James Corden, on 17 November 2016. Featuring Eddie Redmayne reprising his Fantastic Beasts role as Newt Scamander, the skit follows Scamander in modern times as he seeks to get his suitcase through airport security, past an overzealous Transportation Security Administration (TSA) agent (played by the show's host, James Corden).

== Books ==
=== Fantastic Beasts and Where to Find Them – The Original Screenplay ===
Fantastic Beasts and Where to Find Them – The Original Screenplay is an official book containing the original screenplay written by J. K. Rowling for the film of the same name.

In September 2016, Pottermore released the final covers for the UK and US editions of the screenplay. The cover artwork and interior illustrations were designed by Miraphora Mina and Eduardo Lima, the founders of MinaLima.

=== Fantastic Beasts: The Crimes of Grindelwald – The Original Screenplay ===
Fantastic Beasts: The Crimes of Grindelwald – The Original Screenplay was released in November 2018, the same day the film premiered in the UK and US. It was released in both book form and digital form. The events of the screenplay followed the screenplay of the second film. It was written by J. K. Rowling. The cover was designed by MinaLima Design. The book does not contain Rowling's original version, but has been edited to align with the final theatrical cut of the film. As such it does not include any deleted or extended scenes and has been updated to incorporate ad-libbed or modified dialogue.

=== Fantastic Beasts: The Secrets of Dumbledore – The Complete Screenplay ===
Fantastic Beasts: The Secrets of Dumbledore – The Complete Screenplay is the screenplay for Fantastic Beasts: The Secrets of Dumbledore. It was released on 19 July 2022. The book was designed by Paul Kepple and Alex Bruce at Headcase Design. The events of the screenplay follows the screenplay of the third film. It was written by J. K. Rowling and Steve Kloves.

== Video games ==
Title	Release date	Publisher	Developer(s)	Platforms
Fantastic Beasts: Cases From the Wizarding World	17 November 2016	Warner Bros. Interactive Entertainment	Mediatonic; WB Games San Francisco	Android, iOS
Fantastic Beasts and Where to Find Them VR Experience	10 November 2016	Warner Bros. Interactive Entertainment	Framestore	Google Daydream
Fantastic Beasts and Where to Find Them VR Experience	23 January 2018	Warner Bros. Interactive Entertainment	Framestore	HTC Vive, Oculus Rift, Samsung Gear VR

== Music ==
Title	Release date	Length	Composer	Label
Fantastic Beasts and Where to Find Them (Original Motion Picture Soundtrack)	18 November 2016	1 hour, 38 minutes	James Newton Howard	WaterTower Music
Fantastic Beasts: The Crimes of Grindelwald (Original Motion Picture Soundtrack)	9 November 2018	1 hour, 17 minutes	James Newton Howard	WaterTower Music
Fantastic Beasts: The Secrets of Dumbledore (Original Motion Picture Soundtrack)	8 April 2022	1 hour, 50 minutes	James Newton Howard	WaterTower Music

== Reception ==
=== Box office performance ===
Fantastic Beasts and Where to Find Them was the eighth-highest-grossing film of 2016, and The Crimes of Grindelwald was the tenth-highest-grossing film of 2018.

Film	Release date	Box office gross			All-time ranking		Budget	Ref.
Film	Release date	U.S. and Canada	Other territories	Worldwide	U.S. and Canada	Worldwide	Budget	Ref.
Fantastic Beasts and Where to Find Them	18 November 2016	$234,037,575	$580,006,426	$811,724,385	152	88	$175 million	
Fantastic Beasts: The Crimes of Grindelwald	16 November 2018	$159,555,901	$495,300,000	$648,455,339	352	146	$200 million	
Fantastic Beasts: The Secrets of Dumbledore	15 April 2022	$95,850,844	$311,300,000	$407,150,844	814	322	$200 million	
Total		$489,444,320	$1,386,606,426	$1,876,050,746	5	4	$575 million	

=== Critical and public response ===
Film	Critical		Public
Film	Rotten Tomatoes	Metacritic	CinemaScore
Fantastic Beasts and Where to Find Them	74% (347 reviews)	66 (50 reviews)	A
Fantastic Beasts: The Crimes of Grindelwald	36% (336 reviews)	52 (48 reviews)	B+
Fantastic Beasts: The Secrets of Dumbledore	46% (237 reviews)	47 (49 reviews)	B+

=== Accolades ===
==== Academy Awards ====
In 2017, Fantastic Beasts and Where to Find Them won the Academy Award for Best Costume Design, becoming the first film in the overall Wizarding World franchise to win an Academy Award.

Film	Best Art Direction	Best Costume Design
Fantastic Beasts	Nominated	Won

==== British Academy Film Awards ====
Film	Best British Film	Best Costume Design	Best Production Design	Best Sound	Best Visual Effects
Fantastic Beasts	Nominated	Nominated	Won	Nominated	Nominated
The Crimes of Grindelwald			Nominated		Nominated

== Exhibitions and theme park attractions ==
Fantastic Beasts: The Wonder of Nature was open from 9–15 December 2020 and from 17 May 2021 to 3 January 2022 at the Natural History Museum. It consisted of creatures, specimens, and artefacts from the museum's scientific collection displayed side by side with elements from the Wizarding World and digital installations. This exhibit featured 100 objects, including props from the Fantastic Beasts and Harry Potter films. A similar exhibition opened at the Royal Ontario Museum in Toronto, Canada on 11 June 2022 through 2 January 2023.

In January 2024, Universal Orlando announced that the Fantastic Beasts film series would be blended into The Wizarding World of Harry Potter – Ministry of Magic area for their Universal Epic Universe theme park. The area, which opened on 22 May 2025, includes 1920s wizarding Paris and the British Ministry of Magic. The 1920s wizarding Paris area includes the theatrical show Le Cirque Arcanus as well as many shops, restaurants, and experiences.

== Cast members ==
This is a list of Fantastic Beasts cast members who portrayed or voiced characters appearing in the film series. The list below is sorted by film and the character's surname, as some characters have been portrayed by multiple actors.

List indicators

This section includes characters who have appeared in a film in the series.

- An empty grey cell indicates the character was not in the film.
- ^{A} indicates an appearance through archival footage or audio.
- ^{C} indicates a cameo role.
- ^{P} indicates an appearance in onscreen photographs.
- ^{V} indicates a voice-only role.
- ^{Y} indicates a younger version of the character.

Character	2016	2018	2022
Character	Fantastic Beasts and Where to Find Them	Fantastic Beasts: The Crimes of Grindelwald	Fantastic Beasts: The Secrets of Dumbledore
=== Introduced in the Harry Potter film series ===
Aberforth Dumbledore			Richard Coyle
Albus Dumbledore		Jude Law Toby Regbo^{Y}	Jude Law
Gellert Grindelwald	Colin Farrell (Note: Farrell portrays Grindelwald in a majority of the film masquerading as Auror Percival Graves.) Johnny Depp^{C}	Johnny Depp Jamie Campbell Bower^{Y}	Mads Mikkelsen (Note: Mikkelsen replaced Depp after he was asked to resign due to negative publicity resulting from the libel case Depp v News Group Newspapers Ltd.)
Minerva McGonagall		Fiona Glascott	Fiona Glascott
Nagini		Claudia Kim	
=== Introduced in Fantastic Beasts and Where to Find Them ===
Abernathy (Note: Guthrie was set to return but was fired before production began due to his trial and eventual conviction in a sexual assault case.)	Kevin Guthrie	Kevin Guthrie	
Credence Barebone (né: Aurelius Dumbledore)	Ezra Miller	Ezra Miller	Ezra Miller
Chastity Barebone	Jenn Murray		
Mary Lou Barebone	Samantha Morton		
Modesty Barebone	Faith Wood-Blagrove		
Gnarlak	Ron Perlman^{V}		
Porpentina Esther "Tina" Goldstein	Katherine Waterston	Katherine Waterston	Katherine Waterston^{C}
Queenie Goldstein	Alison Sudol	Alison Sudol	Alison Sudol
Jacob Kowalski	Dan Fogler	Dan Fogler	Dan Fogler
Seraphina Picquery	Carmen Ejogo	Carmen Ejogo	
Newt Scamander	Eddie Redmayne	Eddie Redmayne Joshua Shea^{Y}	Eddie Redmayne
Henry Shaw Jnr	Josh Cowdery		
Henry Shaw Snr	Jon Voight		
Langdon Shaw	Ronan Raftery		
Madam Ya Zhou	Gemma Chan		
Leta Lestrange	Zoë Kravitz^{P}	Zoë Kravitz Thea Lamb^{Y} Ruby Woolfenden^{Y}	
=== Introduced in The Crimes of Grindelwald ===
Bunty Broadacre		Victoria Yeates	Victoria Yeates
Carrow		Maja Bloom	Maja Bloom
Irma Dugard		Danielle Hugues	
Nicolas Flamel		Brontis Jodorowsky	
Grimmson		Ingvar Eggert Sigurðsson	
Eulalie "Lally" Hicks		Jessica Williams	Jessica Williams
Laurena Kama		Isaura Barbé-Brown	
Yusuf Kama		William Nadylam Isaac Domingos^{Y}	William Nadylam
Krall		David Sakurai	
Vinda Rosier		Poppy Corby-Tuech	Poppy Corby-Tuech
Theseus Scamander		Callum Turner	Callum Turner
Skender		Ólafur Darri Ólafsson	
=== Introduced in The Secrets of Dumbledore ===
Edith			Ramona Kunze-Libnow
Henrietta Fischer			Valerie Pachner
Helmut			Aleksandr Kuznetsov
Otto			Matthias Brenner
Vicência Santos			Maria Fernanda Cândido
Liu Tao			Dave Wong
Anton Vogel			Oliver Masucci
Warder			Peter Simonischek

== See also ==
- List of films about witchcraft
