= Remus Lupin =

Fictional character from the Harry Potter universe

- Harry Potter character
- David Thewlis as Remus Lupin
- First appearance: Harry Potter and the Prisoner of Azkaban (1999)
- Created by: J. K. Rowling
- Portrayed by: David Thewlis; James Utechin (teenager)

In-universe information
- Full name: Remus John Lupin
- Alias: Moony
- Species: Human werewolf
- Occupation: Professor at Hogwarts
- Affiliation: Order of the Phoenix
- Spouse: Nymphadora Tonks
- Children: Teddy Lupin
- Nationality: British
- House: Gryffindor
- Born: 10 March 1960
- Died: 2 May 1998

Remus Lupin is a fictional character in the Harry Potter book series written by J. K. Rowling. He first appears in Harry Potter and the Prisoner of Azkaban as the new Defence Against the Dark Arts professor. Lupin remains in the story following his resignation from this post, serving as a friend and ally of the central character, Harry Potter. In the films, he is portrayed by David Thewlis as an adult, and James Utechin as a teenager.

== Fictional character biography ==
Lupin is a half-blood, born, according to the series, to wizard Lyall Lupin and his Muggle wife Hope Howell on 10 March 1960. He was bitten by the vicious werewolf Fenrir Greyback when he was a small child, and became infected with lycanthropy; the condition being incurable, he was doomed to live his life as a werewolf. Lupin and his parents feared he would be unable to attend Hogwarts, but headmaster Albus Dumbledore allowed him to enroll—provided certain protective measures were taken. A house was built in Hogsmeade with a secret passage leading to it from under the Whomping Willow. Lupin was smuggled into and confined in this house for his monthly transformations. The transformation from human to werewolf is difficult and painful, and if the creature is isolated, it will become frustrated and harm itself if unable to attack. The villagers mistook Lupin's howling as extremely violent ghosts. The house was dubbed "the Shrieking Shack" and became known as the most haunted building in Britain. Although it was never actually haunted, Dumbledore promoted this rumour to discourage curious villagers from exploring.

When Lupin started Hogwarts, his condition was kept secret, but James Potter, Sirius Black and Peter Pettigrew deduced the truth in their second year. By their fifth year, they secretly and illegally learned how to become Animagi to keep Lupin company during his transformations. His lycanthropy was not transmittable to them in their Animagus forms, nor was he a threat to them while they were animals. Additionally, James and Sirius' Animagi, a stag and a large dog, were large enough to control a werewolf. His friends nicknamed him "Moony" for his condition. When Severus Snape became curious about where Lupin disappeared to each month, Black played a prank on him in their sixth year. Sirius told Snape where Lupin went every month, although he neglected to mention he was a werewolf and knew Snape could be killed if he approached Lupin in his transformed state. Snape, determined to get them in trouble, followed Sirius' directions. When James learned what Sirius did, he stopped Snape before he reached the Shrieking Shack, saving his life. Snape, however, had seen Lupin in werewolf form and was sworn to secrecy by Dumbledore. Snape never forgave Sirius and believed James' only motive in foiling the plan was to avoid expulsion from Hogwarts.

In an interview, J. K. Rowling said Lupin has a desire to be liked, "because he's been disliked so often." Lupin's main failing is, "he's always so pleased to have friends, so he cuts them an awful lot of slack." In Harry Potter and the Order of the Phoenix, Sirius said Lupin was the "good boy," and Rowling says he was the "mature" one. According to Sirius, Lupin did not participate in his and James' bullying, but Lupin regrets never having told them to stop. He is also one of the co-creators of the Marauder's Map, which later falls into Harry Potter's ownership.

Lupin loathes and fears his monthly transformations: when he faces boggarts, they take the form of a globular full moon. These transformations became less severe in Harry Potter and the Prisoner of Azkaban, when the Wolfsbane Potion provided by Snape allowed him to have some control over them, and to retain his mind.

=== Name etymology ===
This character's name is a clear example of Rowling's use of descriptive names for her characters, settings and other story elements. His first name, "Remus," is an allusion to Romulus and Remus, the legendary twin founders of Rome, who as infants were cared for by a she-wolf. Lupin borrows the name of the other twin, "Romulus," as a nom de guerre in Book 7.

His last name, "Lupin," recalls the English word "lupine" (meaning "characteristic of or relating to wolves"), which in turn is derived from Latin lupus ("wolf"). In the folklore of northern France, lupin is also the term used to refer to a type of werewolf, noted for its shyness (in contrast to the more aggressive and violent loup-garou). "Lupin" is also the name of a genus of flowering plant.

== Appearances ==
=== Harry Potter and the Prisoner of Azkaban ===
Remus Lupin first appears in Harry Potter and the Prisoner of Azkaban (1999), as the new Defence Against the Dark Arts professor at Hogwarts. He is first seen on the Hogwarts Express, asleep, and "looked as if one good curse would be able to finish him off". However, when Dementors appeared in the train, Lupin finally wakes up "holding what seemed to be a handful of flames". At the end of the year, Severus Snape, furious over Sirius Black's escape and his resultant loss of the Order of Merlin promised to him by Cornelius Fudge, made public that Lupin was a werewolf, whereupon Lupin resigned in anticipation of the public outcry against a werewolf teaching at Hogwarts. During his tenure, he gave Harry private lessons in casting the Patronus Charm, the only known means of defence against Dementors. His students, excepting a few from Slytherin, held him in extremely high regard and loved his hands-on teaching style. Harry and his friends considered him to have been their best Defence teacher.

Until the climax of Prisoner of Azkaban, Lupin believed Sirius Black was guilty of murdering 12 Muggles, betraying Lily and James Potter, and killing Peter Pettigrew. He eventually discovered the truth — that Sirius was innocent, and the very much alive Peter was the traitor. He helped Sirius to explain the truth to Harry, Ron and Hermione in the Shrieking Shack, and they all confronted Peter, who had been disguised for the previous twelve years as Ron's pet rat, Scabbers. However, Remus had forgotten to take the Wolfsbane potion, which prevented him from becoming violent while a werewolf. While Harry, Ron, and Hermione were distracted by Lupin, Peter assumed his Animagus form and escaped. Lupin later resigned from Hogwarts after Snape exposed his werewolf condition.

=== Harry Potter and the Order of the Phoenix ===
Lupin reappears as an Order of the Phoenix member in Harry Potter and the Order of the Phoenix, but his role in the novel is smaller than in Harry Potter and the Prisoner of Azkaban.

In Harry Potter and the Prisoner of Azkaban, Lupin is described as having "light brown hair" that is greying, and he wears shabby, patched clothing. In Harry Potter and the Order of the Phoenix, he has a pale face with premature lines. Because there are few employment opportunities for werewolves, as most in the wizarding world are prejudiced against them out of fear of the violent transformations, Lupin depends primarily on the kindness of others for support. When additional anti-werewolf laws are passed by the Ministry of Magic under Dolores Umbridge's direction, Lupin becomes nearly unemployable.

Lupin joins the revived Order of the Phoenix in the fifth book and is part of the advance guard who escorts Harry from the Dursley family home in the book's opening chapters. Lupin lives in Grimmauld Place, the Order of the Phoenix headquarters with Sirius Black. Later, he participates in the battle at the Department of Mysteries where he duels Lucius Malfoy. He came out unscathed while Lucius was bound by invisible ropes by Dumbledore.

=== Harry Potter and the Half-Blood Prince ===
In Harry Potter and the Half-Blood Prince, Lupin is working undercover as a spy amongst his fellow werewolves, who are under the leadership of the werewolf Fenrir Greyback, who bit Lupin as a child, and joined forces with Voldemort. Remus admits to Harry that due to prejudice in the wizarding world, he has found the werewolves' siding with Voldemort hard to counter, as the Dark Lord offers them more freedom than they are currently allowed.

At the end of the book, it is revealed that Nymphadora Tonks has fallen in love with Remus, who is much older than her. He resisted becoming involved with her because of the risks from his being a werewolf, and he said he is, "too old, too poor, and too dangerous," for her. However, the two are seen holding hands during Dumbledore's funeral.

=== Harry Potter and the Deathly Hallows ===
Lupin appears in Harry Potter and the Deathly Hallows as even more tired-looking and anxious than before. He takes part in the Order's retrieval of Harry from Privet Drive and just prior to their departure, Tonks reveals that she and Remus were married recently. However, on various occasions he does not appear to be happy but rather tense.

Further into the book, Remus stumbles upon the trio hiding at Grimmauld Place and offers his assistance to help complete whatever task Dumbledore assigned them. A heated argument between Harry and Lupin over his motives for wanting to join them results in the revelation that Tonks is now pregnant; in his paranoia over the possibility of passing down his lycanthropy to his unborn child, he believes his marriage to Tonks has made her an outcast, believing even her own family is disgusted by their alliance, and that the unborn child, would be better off without him. Hermione tries to assure him that a child could never think that of his father; but Harry, who lost his own father and godfather at such a young age, and also does not want to put Remus in danger, criticises him for abandoning his family, going so far as to accuse him of being a coward. Lupin attacks Harry with his wand, smashing him into a wall, and leaves in a rage. Inevitably, he recognizes the truth in Harry's words and returns to Tonks' side.

Lupin remains active in the Order of the Phoenix throughout the year. Loyalists with the wizarding Wireless hear him run the casualty reports section on the pirate radio station Potterwatch under the pseudonym of Romulus, a tribute to the twins Romulus and Remus who were raised by wolves. Months later, Tonks gives birth to a healthy baby boy named Teddy Lupin, who demonstrates Metamorphmagus tendencies instead of lycanthropy, and Lupin meets up with Harry to reconcile with him, naming him his son's godfather.

Lupin commands a group of defenders on the school grounds during the Battle of Hogwarts and is last mentioned to be duelling Antonin Dolohov. Both Lupin and Tonks die in combat, killed by Dolohov and Bellatrix Lestrange, respectively, leaving Teddy an orphan with Harry Potter as his godfather and Andromeda Tonks as his guardian. J. K. Rowling has since stated that she originally intended for both Lupin and Tonks to survive.

When Harry uses the Resurrection Stone, a younger-looking Lupin, along with Sirius, James, and Lily accompany Harry through the Forbidden Forest as he approaches Voldemort and an apparently imminent death. Harry apologizes to them all for their deaths, most especially to Lupin, for he would no longer have a chance to raise his son. Lupin tells Harry that he is sorry too, but also that his son will know what his father died for – a world in which his son would lead a happier life – and hopes that he will understand. The four spectres ward off Dementors as they travel through the forest, much like Patronuses, and are invisible to all but Harry. They disappear when Harry drops the Resurrection Stone as he goes to face the Dark Lord.

Rowling stated in an interview that Lupin and Tonks died to compensate for the last-minute reprieve she gave to Arthur Weasley when he survived a would-have-been fatal attack in Harry Potter and the Order of the Phoenix. Rowling also stated that it was Antonin Dolohov who killed him.

== Portrayal in films ==
Lupin is portrayed by David Thewlis in the Harry Potter films. The director of Prisoner of Azkaban, Alfonso Cuaron, said Thewlis was his first choice to play the role of Lupin. Thewlis had earlier auditioned for the role of Professor Quirrell in Harry Potter and the Philosopher's Stone but lost out to Ian Hart, who in turn encouraged Thewlis to take the role of Lupin. Thewlis appears as Lupin in Harry Potter and the Prisoner of Azkaban, Harry Potter and the Order of the Phoenix, Harry Potter and the Half-Blood Prince, Harry Potter and the Deathly Hallows – Part 1, and finally in Harry Potter and the Deathly Hallows – Part 2. A teenaged version of Lupin briefly appears in Order of the Phoenix played by James Utechin during Snape's memories.

== Reception ==
Lupin's death during the Battle of Hogwarts during Harry Potter and the Deathly Hallows has been described as one of the most emotional deaths of the series. J.K. Rowling apologised for killing the character in the years following.
