= Neville Longbottom =

Character in the Harry Potter universe

- Harry Potter character
- Matthew Lewis as Neville Longbottom in Harry Potter and the Order of the Phoenix
- First appearance: Harry Potter and the Philosopher's Stone (1997)
- Created by: J. K. Rowling
- Portrayed by: Matthew Lewis (films); Rory Wilmot (television series)

In-universe information
- Family: Frank Longbottom (father); Alice Longbottom (mother)
- Spouse: Hannah Abbott
- Relatives: Augusta Longbottom (grandmother)
- Nationality: British
- House: Gryffindor
- Born: 30 July 1980

Neville Longbottom is a fictional character in the Harry Potter series of novels by J. K. Rowling. He is described as a round-faced Gryffindor student in Harry Potter's year. Throughout the series, Neville is often portrayed as a bumbling and disorganised character, and a rather mediocre student, though he is highly gifted at Herbology. However, the character's personality appears to undergo a transition after he joins Dumbledore's Army in Harry Potter and the Order of the Phoenix. The encouragement he receives gives him confidence in his magical abilities, turning him into a more competent wizard. Eventually, Neville becomes the leader of Dumbledore's Army during Harry, Ron and Hermione's absence searching for Horcruxes. Neville is instrumental in the downfall of Lord Voldemort and eventually destroys the final Horcrux, which allows Harry to defeat the Dark Lord once and for all. Neville is portrayed by Matthew Lewis in the Harry Potter films. His evolution from an insecure boy into a courageous leader reflects one of the most profound character arcs in the series.

== Character history ==
=== Early life and family background ===
Neville Longbottom was born into the respected Longbottom family, which is one of the few remaining pure-blood lines in the wizarding world. His parents, Frank and Alice Longbottom, were Aurors who fought valiantly during the First Wizarding War and were members of the original Order of the Phoenix. During Voldemort's reign, the Longbottoms were tortured into insanity by the use of one of the unforgivable curses, Cruciatus Curse, used by Death Eaters. The Death Eaters included Bellatrix Lestrange, Rodolphus Lestrange, Rabastan Lestrange, and Barty Crouch Jr. This torture had left the couple permanently hospitalized. From this event happening, Neville was raised by his grandmother, Augusta Longbottom, who had high expectations for his magical abilities. As a baby, Neville showed little to no signs of having magical abilities, which led his family to believe it was possible that he was a Squib. His early experiences with loss and self-doubt profoundly shaped his character and set the stage for his emotional journey at Hogwarts.

=== Hogwarts years and academic growth ===
Neville started his education at Hogwarts School of Witchcraft and Wizardry at age 11, which is also the same year Harry Potter attends. During his early years, he was known for his clumsiness, lack of confidence, and fear of failure. In his first year, he had fallen off of his broomstick during flying lessons and was known for having a fear of Professor Snape. Over his time at Hogwarts, Neville began to find his strengths and interests. One of these was Herbology, which he excelled in. Through this, Neville's confidence had grown, but a major factor in his confidence was joining Dumbledore's Army in his fifth year. Having Harry Potter as a mentor, Neville was able to develop stronger magical skills which led to increasing his courage and determination. In Neville's seventh year at Hogwarts, he had taken a leadership role within Dumbledore's Army and helped organize the resistance within Hogwarts while it was under the Death Eater's control.

=== Trauma and character growth ===
Throughout the series, Neville's development is shaped by both personal trauma and a desire to prove himself. Neville had a struggle with identity and self worth due to the external factors of the torture of his parents that led to long-term hospitalization, bullying he had endured from students and peers, and lack of self confidence. Neville had overcome these set backs with little acts of bravery throughout the series. In the beginning, he had stood up to his friends in his first year, which he was then rewarded by Dumbledore himself. These early acts of bravery were foreshadowing his character development that would come in the later books. In the final book, Neville has an act of bravery like how he fights Scabior and that results in him retrieving the Sword of Gryffindor from the Sorting Hat and kills Nagini, which was the last remaining Horcrux of Voldemort. His story is represented by the underdog arc, evolving from an insecure boy into a decisive hero.

=== Post-Hogwarts life ===
After the Second Wizarding War, Neville went on to become the Herbology professor at Hogwarts. He remained closely tied to the school and the wizarding world, becoming a respected figure in both education and magical history. In later years, he married Hannah Abbott, a fellow Hogwarts alumna. Neville's career and personal life reflect the quiet resilience that defined much of his journey throughout the series.

== Personality and traits ==
Neville is frequently portrayed as timid and forgetful in the earlier books, often drawing unkind comparisons to more confident peers. Despite this, he consistently demonstrates loyalty and courage, particularly when defending friends or standing up for what is right. His affinity for Herbology reveals a deep appreciation for care, patience, and growth, mirroring his own journey throughout the series.

== Character development ==
Although a secondary character in the first four books, Neville appears often in the role of comic relief. He is one of Harry's strongest supporters over the course of the series, and becomes close friends with Ron, Hermione, Ginny, and Luna as well. Neville plays a significant part in the two final books and the fight against Lord Voldemort, destroying the final Horcrux, Nagini, with the Sword of Gryffindor. The Sword appearing for Neville in his time of need is Neville's confirmation that he is a true Gryffindor, as he had always doubted his placement in the house since the beginning, wondering why he was not sorted into Hufflepuff.

Rowling said in an interview that "there's a lot of Neville in me—this feeling of just never being quite good enough... I felt that a lot when I was younger". For that reason, she wanted Neville to do something brave in Harry Potter and the Philosopher's Stone, in which Neville "finds true moral courage in standing up to his closest friends—the people who are on his side" towards the climax of the novel. She also said in that interview that this was "...a very important moment for me too in the first book".

== Appearances ==
=== Novels ===
Neville first appears in Harry Potter and the Philosopher's Stone. He befriends Harry, Ron and Hermione on the Hogwarts Express, and joins them as a member of Gryffindor House at Hogwarts. After Neville confronts his friends about their willingness to break school rules, the headmaster Albus Dumbledore awards him ten house points for his bravery. These points allow Gryffindor to win the House Cup.

In Chamber of Secrets, Neville fears that Slytherin's monster will attack him because of his poor magical abilities. In Prisoner of Azkaban, Remus Lupin helps Neville defeat a Boggart. In Goblet of Fire, Dumbledore reveals to Harry that Neville was raised by his grandmother because his parents were tortured into insanity by Death Eaters.

Neville's magical abilities improve under the tutelage of Harry in Order of the Phoenix. During the battle at the Department of Mysteries, Neville accidentally breaks the prophecy made about Harry and Voldemort. The following year, in Half-Blood Prince, Neville is invited to a meeting of the Slug Club by Horace Slughorn. In academics, Neville achieves high marks in Herbology, Defence Against the Dark Arts and Charms. When a group of Death Eaters enter Hogwarts, Neville fights them alongside his friends.

In Deathly Hallows, Neville revives the student defence group Dumbledore's Army (D.A.) and leads the resistance against Voldemort's takeover of Hogwarts. Neville is chased by some Death Eaters, led by Scabior but Neville outruns them and sends them to their deaths. During the Battle of Hogwarts, Neville and Ron defeat Fenrir Greyback. Neville also kills Voldemort's Horcrux-snake Nagini, which makes Voldermort mortal and leads to his death. In the epilogue of Deathly Hallows, which is set nineteen years later, Ginny mentions that Neville is now the Herbology professor at Hogwarts.

=== Film adaptations ===
Neville is portrayed by Matthew Lewis in the Harry Potter films. For Prisoner of Azkaban, Lewis wore overly large shoes and crooked yellow false teeth. He also had pieces of plastic placed behind his ears so they would stick out. Prior to the release of the fifth film, Lewis commented on Neville's character development that he thinks "it's amazing that the character of Neville has really shaken off his klutz image (to an extent.) It very good to see him finally being a help as opposed to making things worse, I'm looking forward to the 5th film, it will be interesting to almost play a different character." When asked if he feels related to Neville, Lewis replied that he is "clumsy and terribly forgetful" just like his character is, but that he does not have "the same nervous disposition as Neville", and that it is interesting to play somebody that, despite being picked on at school, still does the right thing.

=== Stage adaptation ===
In Harry Potter and the Cursed Child, Neville's death before the Battle of Hogwarts is the point of divergence for an alternate timeline in which Voldemort killed Harry and won the wizarding war.

== Characterisation ==
The novels describe Neville as round-faced. At one point, Rowling described him as short, plump and blond. Early in the series, Neville is shown to be shy and lacking self-confidence. He is portrayed as an incompetent wizard and a generally poor student (except in Herbology, where he excels). Neville admits in Chamber of Secrets that his family feared he was a Squib during his childhood. Prisoner of Azkaban described Neville as terrified of Professor Snape. When Neville joins Dumbledore's Army in Order of the Phoenix, his magical abilities improve. In Deathly Hallows, he becomes a leader in the organization.

Rowling revealed more information about Neville when she stated that he married Hannah Abbott, a Hufflepuff classmate, who became the landlady of the Leaky Cauldron. The couple live over the pub, a fact that Rowling thought people would find "particularly cool".

Lewis described Neville as an unexpected hero and claimed he could have fulfilled Harry's role as the "Chosen One" who battles Voldemort.
