= Luna Lovegood =

Harry Potter character

- Harry Potter character
- Evanna Lynch as Luna Lovegood (Note: Harry Potter and the Order of the Phoenix (2007))
- First appearance: Harry Potter and the Order of the Phoenix (2003)
- Created by: J. K. Rowling
- Portrayed by: Evanna Lynch

In-universe information
- Nickname: Loony Lovegood
- Occupation: Magizoologist
- Family: Xenophilius Lovegood (father); Pandora Lovegood (mother)
- Spouse: Rolf Scamander
- Children: Lorcan Scamander; Lysander Scamander
- House: Ravenclaw
- Born: 13 February 1981

Luna Lovegood is a fictional character in the Harry Potter series of novels by J. K. Rowling. She first appears in Harry Potter and the Order of the Phoenix (2003). She is portrayed by Evanna Lynch in the Harry Potter films.

== Characterisation ==
The "first intimation" of Luna was originally called Lily Moon. Rowling envisioned her as a "fey, dreamy girl" and her surname (Moon) is mentioned during Harry's Sorting Ceremony. Rowling has described Luna as the "anti-Hermione" because Luna arrives at beliefs through faith, while Hermione relies on facts and logic. Hermione repeatedly tries to convince Luna that her beliefs are nonsense, but this only annoys Luna, which is rare. Luna is perceptive about human nature, and Harry notes her knack for blunt honesty, which can be uncomfortable, but always eye-opening and true. She holds her friends in high regard; she painted portraits of Harry, Ron, Hermione, Ginny, and Neville on the ceiling of her room, with links around them that say friends (as seen in the seventh book/movie). Luna's father is Xenophilius Lovegood, the editor of the magazine The Quibbler. Luna witnessed the death of her mother when she was nine years old, so she can see Thestrals.

In interviews following the release of Deathly Hallows, Rowling revealed facts about Luna's life after Hogwarts. Luna pursues a career as a "magizoologist": a zoologist for magical creatures. She discovers many new species of animals and becomes quite famous for it. She marries Rolf Scamander, who is a fellow naturalist and the grandson of Newt Scamander. Luna and Rolf have twin sons, Lorcan and Lysander.

== Appearances ==
=== Novels ===
Harry Potter and the Goblet of Fire (2000) has the very first and only brief mention of the surname Lovegood in the beginning. Luna herself first appears in Harry Potter and the Order of the Phoenix (2003) as a Ravenclaw student, sorted due to her wit and creativity, found to be one year below Harry. Other students call her "Loony Lovegood” due to the fact that many view her beliefs as “strange”. She and her father, Xenophilius, believe the claims made by Harry and Albus Dumbledore that Lord Voldemort has returned. Luna and Hermione Granger persuade the journalist Rita Skeeter to interview Harry so his claims can be published in The Quibbler, a magazine edited by Xenophilius. During the course of the novel, Luna practices her defensive spellcasting as a member of Dumbledore's Army. Near the end of the story, she participates in the battle with Death Eaters at the Ministry of Magic. In Half-Blood Prince (2005), Luna attends Horace Slughorn's Christmas party with Harry. When Death Eaters attack Hogwarts, Luna, Ginny and Neville attempt to protect the school.

Luna does her sixth year at Hogwarts in Deathly Hallows (2007). She and Ginny help Neville revive Dumbledore's Army, which infuriates the Death Eaters who are now in control of the school. Hoping to aid Harry on his quest to destroy Horcruxes, Luna and her friends try to steal the Sword of Gryffindor from the office of Severus Snape. They are caught and given a lenient punishment: a trip to the Forbidden Forest with Rubeus Hagrid. While travelling home for Christmas on the Hogwarts Express, Luna is kidnapped by Death Eaters. They hold her hostage to stop her father from publishing content supportive of Harry in The Quibbler. Harry, Ron and Hermione are also captured by Voldemort's followers, who imprison them in the cellar of Malfoy Manor with Luna and Mr Ollivander. All the prisoners are eventually rescued by the house-elf Dobby.

In the Battle of Hogwarts, Luna summons her Patronus, a hare, to fend off hundreds of Dementors that are about to attack her friends. Luna, Hermione and Ginny duel Bellatrix Lestrange until Molly Weasley intervenes and kills Bellatrix. After the battle, Luna helps Harry slip away from the celebratory crowd to find some peace and quiet. The novel's epilogue reveals that Harry and Ginny have a daughter named Lily. In an ITV documentary, Rowling said that Lily's middle name is Luna.

=== Film adaptations ===
Luna appears in the film versions of Order of the Phoenix (2007), Half-Blood Prince (2009), and Deathly Hallows – Part 1 (2010) and Part 2 (2011). Evanna Lynch was cast in the role over Saoirse Ronan. (Note: Attributed to multiple references:) Rowling called Lynch "perfect" for the role. When developing the visual style of Luna's character, costume designer Jany Temime stated that Luna "is clearly a girl with her own tastes and her own hobbies, which include making her own jewelry". Thus, Luna's distinctive radish-shaped earrings and Butterbeer-cap necklace referenced in the books are featured in the films. Her "folk art" aura was developed with mismatched outfits in predominantly purple and blue hues featuring animals or natural elements.

== Reception ==
The entertainment website IGN ranked Luna as the 12th best Harry Potter character. The website called Luna heroic and said she plays a critical role in the student group Dumbledore's Army. Empire magazine listed Luna as the 10th best character in the Harry Potter franchise.
