= Harry Potter and the Order of the Phoenix (film) =

2007 fantasy film directed by David Yates

- UK theatrical release poster
- Directed by: David Yates
- Screenplay by: Michael Goldenberg
- Based on: Harry Potter and the Order of the Phoenix by J. K. Rowling
- Produced by: David Heyman; David Barron
- Starring: Daniel Radcliffe; Rupert Grint; Emma Watson; Helena Bonham Carter; Robbie Coltrane; Warwick Davis; Ralph Fiennes; Michael Gambon; Brendan Gleeson; Richard Griffiths; Jason Isaacs; Gary Oldman; Alan Rickman; Fiona Shaw; Maggie Smith; Imelda Staunton; David Thewlis; Emma Thompson; Julie Walters
- Cinematography: Sławomir Idziak
- Edited by: Mark Day
- Music by: Nicholas Hooper
- Production companies: Warner Bros. Pictures; Heyday Films
- Distributed by: Warner Bros. Pictures
- Release dates: 28 June 2007 (Tokyo); 11 July 2007 (United States); 12 July 2007 (United Kingdom)
- Running time: 138 minutes
- Countries: United Kingdom; United States
- Language: English
- Budget: $150–200 million
- Box office: $942.9 million

Harry Potter and the Order of the Phoenix is a 2007 fantasy film directed by David Yates from a screenplay by Michael Goldenberg. It is based on the 2003 novel Harry Potter and the Order of the Phoenix by J. K. Rowling. It is the sequel to Harry Potter and the Goblet of Fire (2005) and the fifth instalment in the Harry Potter film series. The film stars Daniel Radcliffe as Harry Potter, alongside Rupert Grint and Emma Watson as Harry's best friends Ron Weasley and Hermione Granger respectively. Its story follows Harry's fifth year at Hogwarts School of Witchcraft and Wizardry as the Ministry of Magic is in denial of Lord Voldemort's return.

Filming took place in England and Scotland for exterior locations and Leavesden Film Studios in Watford for interior locations from February to November 2006, with a one-month break in June. Post-production on the film continued for several months afterwards to add in visual effects. The film's budget was reportedly between £75 and 100 million ($150–200 million).

Harry Potter and the Order of the Phoenix was released in 2D cinemas and IMAX formats in the United States on 11 July 2007 and in the United Kingdom on 12 July, by Warner Bros. Pictures. The film received generally positive reviews from critics and was nominated for many awards, including the BAFTA Award for Best Production Design and Special Visual Effects. With a worldwide five-day opening of $333 million and a total gross of $942 million, it was the second-highest-grossing film of 2007, and was noted as a case of Hollywood accounting, as Warner Bros. claimed that it lost $167 million despite the total gross. A sequel, Harry Potter and the Half-Blood Prince, was released in 2009.

== Plot ==
While staying at the Dursleys' in 1995, Harry Potter and Dudley Dursley are attacked by Dementors. Harry repels them using a Patronus spell. The Ministry of Magic detects Harry using magic and expels him from Hogwarts, though he is later exonerated.

The Order of the Phoenix, a secret organisation founded by Albus Dumbledore, informs Harry that the Ministry of Magic is attempting to stonewall rumors about Lord Voldemort's return. (Note: As depicted in Harry Potter and the Goblet of Fire (2005)) At the Order's headquarters, Harry's godfather, Sirius Black, mentions that Voldemort seeks an object he previously lacked; Harry believes it to be a weapon.

Minister for Magic Cornelius Fudge has appointed Dolores Umbridge as Hogwarts' new Defence Against the Dark Arts professor. Umbridge's refusal to teach defensive spells causes her and Harry to clash. Harry is forced to write lines for "lying" about Voldemort; a magic quill etches the words into his hand as he writes. Ron and Hermione are outraged, but Harry refuses to tell Dumbledore, who has distanced himself from Harry. As Umbridge gains more control over the school, Ron and Hermione help Harry form "Dumbledore's Army", a secret group to teach students defensive spells. Umbridge recruits Slytherins for an Inquisitorial Squad to spy on the other students. Meanwhile, Harry and Cho Chang develop romantic feelings for each other.

One night, Harry envisions Arthur Weasley being attacked at the Ministry, seeing it from the attacker's perspective. Concerned that Voldemort will exploit this connection to Harry, Dumbledore has Severus Snape teach Harry Occlumency to defend his mind from Voldemort's influence. During a lesson, Harry sees Snape's memories of how his father, James, bullied and tormented Snape in school. The connection between Harry and Voldemort further isolates Harry from his friends. Meanwhile, Bellatrix Lestrange, Sirius's deranged Death Eater cousin, escapes Azkaban prison along with nine other Death Eaters. At Hogwarts, Umbridge and her Inquisitorial Squad expose Dumbledore's Army. Dumbledore, falsely accused of forming it, escapes as Fudge orders his arrest. Harry believes Cho betrayed Dumbledore's Army to Umbridge, ending their budding relationship. Umbridge becomes the new Headmistress.

Harry experiences a vision that Voldemort is torturing Sirius. Harry, Ron, and Hermione rush to Umbridge's office to alert the Order via the Floo Network. Umbridge catches them and, as she is about to severely punish Harry, Hermione claims Dumbledore has hidden a "secret weapon" in the Forbidden Forest. She and Harry lead Umbridge to where Hagrid's giant half-brother, Grawp is kept. The centaurs confront them and kidnap Umbridge after she insults and attacks them. Harry, Hermione, Ron, Luna, Neville and Ginny fly to the Ministry of Magic on Thestrals to save Sirius.

The six enter the Department of Mysteries and recover the object that Voldemort is after, a bottled prophecy labelled with Harry's name. Death Eaters ambush them, including Lucius Malfoy and Bellatrix Lestrange. Lucius reveals that Harry's vision of Sirius being tortured was a ruse to lure him there. Harry refuses to give Lucius the prophecy, and a fight ensues. The Death Eaters overpower the students and force Harry to surrender the prophecy. When Harry hands it to Lucius, Sirius and Remus Lupin arrive with Order members, including Nymphadora Tonks, Kingsley Shacklebolt and Mad-Eye Moody. Lucius accidentally drops the prophecy during the chaos, destroying it. Just as Sirius overpowers Lucius, Bellatrix kills Sirius.

Voldemort appears, but moments before he can kill Harry, Dumbledore arrives. A violent duel erupts, destroying much of the Atrium, while Bellatrix escapes. The two wizards are evenly matched, so Voldemort possesses Harry's body, wanting Dumbledore to sacrifice him. The love Harry feels for his friends and family quickly drives out Voldemort. Ministry officials arrive before Voldemort disapparates; Fudge admits that Voldemort has returned and resigns in disgrace. Umbridge is dismissed and Dumbledore returns as Hogwarts headmaster. Dumbledore explains he had distanced himself from Harry to prevent Voldemort exploiting their connection. He also reveals the prophecy. As he grieves Sirius's death, Harry tries to accept the prophecy: "Neither can live while the other survives."

== Cast ==
- Daniel Radcliffe as Harry Potter: A 15-year-old British wizard famous for surviving his parents' murder at the hands of Voldemort as an infant, who now enters his fifth year at Hogwarts School of Witchcraft and Wizardry.
- Rupert Grint as Ron Weasley: Harry's best friend at Hogwarts.
- Emma Watson as Hermione Granger: Harry's Muggle-born best friend and the brains of the trio.
- Helena Bonham Carter as Bellatrix Lestrange: one of Voldemort's most loyal Death Eaters and the cousin of Sirius Black.
- Robbie Coltrane as Rubeus Hagrid: the half-giant Gamekeeper and Care of Magical Creatures teacher at Hogwarts and a member of the Order of the Phoenix.
- Ralph Fiennes as Lord Voldemort: leader of the Death Eaters, a Dark wizard intent on conquering the wizarding world
- Michael Gambon as Albus Dumbledore: the legendary Hogwarts headmaster and leader of the Order of the Phoenix.
- Brendan Gleeson as Mad-Eye Moody: Ex-Auror and a member of the Order of the Phoenix.
- Richard Griffiths as Vernon Dursley: Harry's Muggle uncle.
- Jason Isaacs as Lucius Malfoy: a falsely pardoned senior Death Eater.
- Gary Oldman as Sirius Black: Harry's godfather and a member of the Order of the Phoenix.
- Alan Rickman as Severus Snape: the Potions teacher at Hogwarts and the Head of Slytherin
- Fiona Shaw as Petunia Dursley: Harry's Muggle aunt.
- Maggie Smith as Minerva McGonagall: the Transfiguration teacher at Hogwarts and a member of the Order of the Phoenix.
- Imelda Staunton as Dolores Umbridge: the new Defence Against the Dark Arts teacher and a plant from the corrupt Ministry of Magic.
- David Thewlis as Remus Lupin: Harry's ex-Defense Against the Dark Arts teacher and a member of the Order of the Phoenix.
- Emma Thompson as Sybill Trelawney: the Divination teacher at Hogwarts.
- Julie Walters as Molly Weasley: the Weasley matriarch and a mother figure to Harry, also a member of the Order of the Phoenix.

Mark Williams appears as Molly Weasley's husband, Arthur, a member of the Order of the Phoenix. Warwick Davis plays Filius Flitwick, the school's charms teacher, maestro and Head of Ravenclaw House while David Bradley plays Hogwarts caretaker, Argus Filch. Tom Felton, Jamie Waylett and Joshua Herdman play Slytherin students Draco Malfoy, Vincent Crabbe and Gregory Goyle. James and Oliver Phelps, Bonnie Wright and Chris Rankin play Ron's siblings, Fred, George, Ginny and Percy while Devon Murray, Alfred Enoch and Matthew Lewis play Gryffindor students, Seamus Finnigan, Dean Thomas and Neville Longbottom. Katie Leung plays Harry's love interest, Cho Chang. Robert Hardy plays the Minister for Magic, Cornelius Fudge. Harry Melling plays Harry's cousin, Dudley Dursley.

Evanna Lynch joins the cast as Ravenclaw student Luna Lovegood. Timothy Bateson voices house-elf, Kreacher and Tony Maudsley plays Hagrid's half-brother, Grawp. Kathryn Hunter plays the Dursley's neighbour, Mrs. Figg. George Harris and Natalia Tena play members of the Order of the Phoenix, Kingsley Shacklebolt and Nymphadora Tonks.

== Production ==
=== Development ===
British television director David Yates was chosen to direct the film after Harry Potter and the Goblet of Fire director Mike Newell, as well as Jean-Pierre Jeunet, Guillermo del Toro, Matthew Vaughn and Mira Nair, turned down offers. Yates believed he was approached because the studio saw him fit to handle an "edgy and emotional" film with a "political backstory", which some of his previous television projects including State of Play, Sex Traffic and The Girl in the Café demonstrated. Producer David Heyman supported Yates's comments about the film's political theme, stating that "[Order of the Phoenix] is a political film, not with a capital P, but it's about teen rebellion and the abuse of power. David has made films in the UK about politics without being heavy handed." On the film's political and social aspects, Emma Watson stated that "somehow it talks about life after 7 July, the way people behave when they're scared, the way truth is often denied and all the things our society has to face. Facing the fact that the authority is corrupted means having a non-conformist approach to reality and power."

Steve Kloves, the screenwriter of the first four Potter films, had other commitments. Michael Goldenberg, who was considered to pen the first film in the series, filled in and wrote the script. Kloves subsequently returned to write all remaining instalments of the series.

Mark Day was the film editor, Sławomir Idziak was the cinematographer, and Jany Temime was the costume designer. Choreographer Paul Harris, who had previously worked with David Yates several times, created a physical language for wand combat to choreograph the wand fighting scenes.

=== Casting ===
Casting began as early as May 2005, when Radcliffe announced he would reprise his role as Harry. Across the media frenzy that took place during the release of Goblet of Fire, most of the main returning actors announced their return to the series, including Grint, Watson, Lewis, Wright, Leung, and Fiennes.

The announcements of the casting of the rest of the new characters to the series was spanned across 2006. Evanna Lynch won the role of Luna Lovegood over 15,000 other girls who attended the open casting call, waiting in a line of hopefuls that stretched a mile long. Saoirse Ronan auditioned for the role but was considered too young.

Persistent rumours linked Elizabeth Hurley to the role of Bellatrix Lestrange, although Warner Bros. Pictures asserted there was "no truth whatsoever" to reports that she had been cast. As early as August 2005, rumours began linking Helen McCrory to the role. On 2 February 2006, it was announced that McCrory had indeed been cast as Bellatrix. However, in April 2006 she revealed that she was three months pregnant and withdrew from the film because she would not have been able to perform the intense battle sequences in the Ministry of Magic in September and October 2006. The announcement that Bonham Carter had been recast in the role was made on 25 May 2006. McCrory was subsequently cast as Narcissa Malfoy from Harry Potter and the Half-Blood Prince onwards.

The inclusion or cutting of some characters sparked speculation from fans as to the importance of the characters in the final book of the series, which was released just ten days after the film. In April 2006, representatives of Jim McManus said he would be playing Aberforth Dumbledore, Albus's brother and the barman of the Hog's Head, in which Harry and his friends found Dumbledore's Army. A week later WB announced that the role was "very minor", allaying some of the speculation to the significance of the role, which, before the final book, was not even a speaking part. MTV reported in October 2006 that Dobby the house elf, who appeared in the second film, Chamber of Secrets, and in the fifth book, would be cut, opening up "plot questions" as to how the role of the elf would be filled. MTV also reported about a month before the release of the final book that Kreacher, the Black family's house-elf, was cut from the film in one draft of the script. Rowling prodded the filmmakers to include him, saying, "You know, I wouldn't [cut him] if I were you. Or you can, but if you get to make a seventh film, you'll be tied in knots", he was added back into the script.

Other minor roles were cut with subsequent drafts of the script. At the US premiere of Goblet of Fire, series producer David Heyman said that former Hogwarts professor Gilderoy Lockhart, played by Kenneth Branagh in Harry Potter and the Chamber of Secrets, was in the first draft of the script for Phoenix. Neither Branagh nor the character of Lockhart appears in the final version. Tiana Benjamin was scheduled to return for the film in the role of Angelina Johnson, the captain of the Gryffindor Quidditch team, but she had to withdraw due to a commitment to playing Chelsea Fox in EastEnders. The character, as well as the entire Quidditch subplot, was ultimately cut from the film. Benjamin did record sound clips for the Order of the Phoenix video game.

The family of footballer Theo Walcott made a cameo appearance in the film. They were signed on by director David Yates, who is the partner of Yvonne Walcott, Theo's aunt. Theo himself was due to appear alongside his family, though his commitments to Arsenal Football Club forced him to pull out.

=== Set design ===
Stuart Craig returned as set designer, having designed the first four films' sets. There were a number of notable new sets in this film. The atrium in the Ministry of Magic is over 200 feet in length, making it the largest and most expensive set built for the Potter film series to date. Craig's design was inspired by early London Underground stations, where, he said, architects "tried to imitate classical architecture but they used ceramic tile", as well as a Burger King on Tottenham Court Road in London, where "there's a fantastic Victorian façade which just embodies the age". The set of Number Twelve, Grimmauld Place contains the Black family tapestry spread across three walls; when the producers told Rowling they wanted to visualise the details of each name and birth year, she faxed them a complete copy of the entire tree. The set of the Hall of Prophecies was entirely digitally built. During a fight scene which occurs there, prophecies crash to the ground and break; had it been an actual physical set, the reset time would have been weeks.

The set used for Igor Karkaroff's trial scene in Goblet of Fire was doubled in size for Harry's trial in this film, while still protecting its symmetry. New professor Dolores Umbridge, though she teaches in a classroom that has appeared in films two through four, inhabits an office vastly different from those of her predecessors. The set was redressed with "fluffy, pink filigree" and a number of plates upon which moving kittens were animated in post-production. A 24-hour photo shoot was held to photograph and film the kittens for use on these plates. The quill which Umbridge gives Harry to write lines is designed by the set designers.

=== Filming ===
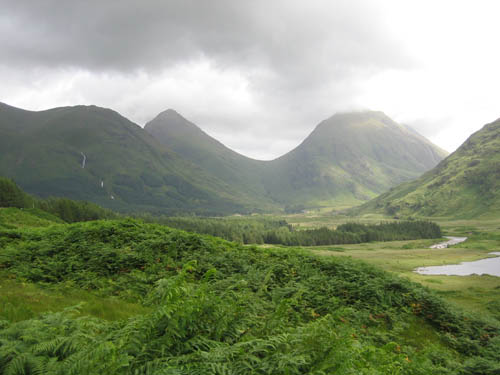
Filming of aerial and backdrop shots took place at Glen Etive, Scotland

Rehearsals for Order of the Phoenix began on 27 January 2006, and principal photography began on 7 February 2006 and wrapped in November 2006. Filming was put on a two-month hiatus starting in May 2006 so Radcliffe could sit his A/S Levels and Watson could sit her GCSE exams. The film's budget was reportedly between £75 and 100 million (US$150–200 million). The largest budget of the other films in the series has been the £75 million it cost to make Goblet of Fire. Though the producers explored options to film outside of the UK, Leavesden Film Studios in Watford was again the location on which many of the interior scenes, including the Great Hall, Privet Drive, and Number Twelve, Grimmauld Place were shot.

One of the locations in England is the River Thames, used for the flight of the Order of the Phoenix to Number Twelve, Grimmauld Place and the flight of Dumbledore's Army to the Ministry of Magic. This sequence also includes such landmarks as the London Eye, Canary Wharf, Big Ben, Buckingham Palace, and HMS Belfast. Filming at platform nine and three-quarters took place at King's Cross station, as it has in the past. A red telephone booth near Scotland Yard was used as Harry and Arthur Weasley enter the Ministry, while the crew closed the Westminster tube station on 22 October 2006 to allow for filming of Arthur Weasley accompanying Harry to his trial at the Ministry of Magic. Other scenes were filmed in and around Oxford, specifically at nearby Blenheim Palace in Woodstock.

In Glenfinnan, the Hogwarts Express crosses a viaduct, as it has in the past films. Aerial scenes were shot in Glen Coe, Clachaig Gully, and Glen Etive, which, at the time of filming, was one of the few places in Scotland without snow, making it ideal for a backdrop.

Director David Yates stated in an interview that he had originally shot a three-hour cut of Order of the Phoenix. However, some material had to be cut out in the final edit, as the movie was 45 minutes too long. Therefore, several locations that were used for various scenes do not appear in the final cut of the film. In Virginia Water, scenes were shot where Professor McGonagall recovers from Stunning Spells, and Burnham Beeches was used for filming the scene where Hagrid introduces his fifth-year Care of magical creatures class to Thestrals. Harry skips stones in front of the Glenfinnan Monument in Glenfinnan in another cut scene.

=== Visual effects ===
The film required over 1,400 visual effects shots, and the London-based company Double Negative created more than 950 of them. Working for six months on previsualisation starting in September 2005, Double Negative was largely responsible for sequences in the Room of Requirement, the Forbidden Forest, the Hall of Prophecies, and the Death Chamber.

A new character in the film, Grawp, Hagrid's giant half-brother, came to life by a new technology called Soul Capturing, developed by Image Metrics. Instead of building the character from scratch, the movements and facial expressions of actor Tony Maudsley were used to model Grawp's actions.

=== Music and soundtrack ===
Nicholas Hooper was the composer for the soundtrack of the film, following John Williams, who scored the first three films, and Patrick Doyle, who did the fourth. In the new score, Hooper incorporated variations on "Hedwig's Theme", the series' theme originally written by Williams for the first film and heard in all subsequent instalments. In March and April 2007, Hooper and the Chamber Orchestra of London recorded nearly two hours of music at Abbey Road Studios in London. The score, like the film and book, is darker than previous instalments in the series. To emphasise this, the two new main themes reflect the sinister new character Dolores Umbridge, and Lord Voldemort's invasion of Harry's mind. A Japanese Taiko drum was used for a deeper sound in the percussion. The soundtrack was released by Warner Bros. Records on 10 July 2007, the eve of the film's release. For his work on the film, Hooper was nominated for a World Soundtrack Discovery Award. The trailer prominently features the cues "Divine Crusade" by X-Ray Dog and "DNA Reactor" by Pfeifer Broz. Music.

The film also featured the song "Boys Will Be Boys" by The Ordinary Boys which played during a scene in the Gryffindor common room (at min. 31:35). According to Rupert Grint, David Yates used the song to create a more "casual" feel to the Common Room.

== Differences from the book ==
At 766 pages in the British edition and 870 in the American edition, Order of the Phoenix is the longest book in the Harry Potter series, however the film is the second shortest. Screenwriter Michael Goldenberg described his task to cut down the novel as searching for "the best equivalent way to tell the story. My job was to stay true to the spirit of the book, rather than to the letter". Goldenberg said that Rowling told him, the producers, and Yates that "she just wanted to see a great movie, and gave [them] permission to take whatever liberties [they] felt [they] needed to take to translate the book into a movie she would love". Cutting down the book to meet the time frame of the film, Goldenberg explained, became "clearer when [he] figured out that the organising principle of the screenplay was to narrate Harry's emotional journey". He and Yates "looked for every opportunity to get everything [they] could in there. And where [they] couldn't, to sort of pay homage to it, to have it somewhere in the background or to feel like it could be taking place off-screen".

One cut Goldenberg had to make, which he "hated" to do, was the absence of Quidditch, the Wizarding sport. "The truth is that any movie made of this book, whoever made it, that had included the Quidditch subplot would have been a lesser film", he said. In the book, Ron grows as a character by trying out for the Quidditch team. "Ron facing challenges and coming into his own in the same way that Harry is, we tried to get that into the film in other ways, as much as possible. So, you feel like, if not the details of that story, at least the spirit of it is present in the film". The change disappointed actor Rupert Grint who had been "quite looking forward to the Quidditch stuff".

In a significant scene in the book, Harry sees a memory of his own father humiliating Snape in their school days, and Snape insulting his mother after she stood up for him. In the film, it is abbreviated to an "idea", in Goldenberg's words. "It's an iconic moment when you realise your parents are normal, flawed human beings. ... Things get trimmed out, but I kept the meat of that in there – and that was what really gave me the coming-of-age story." Young Lily Potter did not appear at all, but promotional screenshots showed unknown teenager Susie Shinner in the role.

The scene at St Mungo's, the hospital where Harry and friends run into classmate Neville Longbottom and learn that his parents were tortured into insanity by Bellatrix Lestrange, was cut because it required the construction of a new set. The main purpose of the action of the scene was relocated to the Room of Requirement after one of Dumbledore's Army's lessons. Also, to speed up the film's climax, several events in the Ministry leading up to Harry's battle with Voldemort were removed, including the brain room. Mrs. Weasley's encounter with a boggart at Grimmauld Place, Ron, Hermione and Draco becoming prefects, the appearance of Mundungus Fletcher, and Firenze teaching Divination followed suit.

The character of Kreacher the house-elf, who was included in the script only at Rowling's request, has a larger part in the book than the film. In the novel, he is seen saving some of the Black family's artefacts which the Order of the Phoenix throw away, including a locket that ends up being extremely important in the seventh book. "It was kind of tricky to raise that in our story, because it's for so much later", Yates said. "We figured we can probably introduce it later, and that's the approach we took". Whilst Kreacher remained, all parts involving Dobby were cut, and his important actions were given to other characters.

Rita Skeeter, the journalist played by Miranda Richardson in Goblet of Fire, was also removed. In the book, Hermione blackmails her into writing an article that supports Harry as the rest of the wizarding world denies his claims. Richardson noted that "it's never gonna be the book on film, exactly. ... They'll take certain aspects from the book and make it something that they hope is going to be commercial and that people want to see".

== Release ==
=== Marketing ===
An advertisement for the film on a London double-decker bus

The first trailer was released on 17 November 2006, attached to another WB film, Happy Feet. It was made available online on 20 November 2006, on the Happy Feet website. The international trailer debuted online on 22 April 2007 at 14:00 UTC. On 4 May 2007, the US trailer was shown before Spider-Man 3.

Three posters released on the Internet that showed Harry accompanied by six classmates, including Hermione Granger, generated some controversy by the media. They were essentially the same picture, though one advertised the IMAX release. In one poster, the profile of Hermione, played by Emma Watson, was made curvier as the outline of her breasts was enhanced. Melissa Anelli, webmistress of noted fan site The Leaky Cauldron, wrote:

The video game version, designed by EA UK, was released 25 June 2007, as well as Harry Potter: Mastering Magic mobile game by EA Mobile. Lego produced just one set, a model of Hogwarts, the lowest number of sets for a film so far. NECA produced a series of action figures, while a larger array of smaller figures was also produced by PopCo Entertainment, a Corgi International company.

=== Theatrical release ===
The film was the third Harry Potter film to be given a simultaneous release in conventional theatres and IMAX. The IMAX release featured the full movie in 2D and the final 20 minutes of the film in 3D. According to estimates in March 2007, by Warner Bros. Pictures, the film would debut on over 10,000 theatre screens during the summer.

Previews of the film began in March 2007 in the Chicago area. Under tight security to prevent piracy, WB had security guards patrol the aisles, looking for cell phone cameras or small recording devices, at a preview in Japan. The world premiere took place in Tokyo, Japan on 28 June 2007. MySpace users could bring copies of their online profiles to gain free admission to sneak previews in eight different cities across the country on 28 June 2007. The UK premiere took place on 3 July 2007 in London's Odeon Leicester Square, during which author J. K. Rowling made a public appearance. The US premiere took place on 8 July in Los Angeles. After the premiere, the three young stars of the film series, Radcliffe, Grint, and Watson, were honoured with a ceremony where their handprints, footprints, and "wandprints" were placed in the cement in front of Grauman's Chinese Theatre.

Originally, Warner Bros. set the Australian release date as 6 September 2007, nearly two months after the majority of other release dates. However, after complaints from the Australian community, including a petition garnering 2,000 signatures the date was pulled back to 11 July 2007. The release dates of the film in the UK and US were also moved back, both from 13 July, to 12 and 11 July, respectively.

Even though the book is the longest in the series (over 700 pages), the film is 138 minutes long (2 hours and 18 minutes), the second shortest in the entire film series.

=== Home media ===
The DVDs included additional scenes, a feature showing a day in the life of Natalia Tena, who played Nymphadora Tonks, an A&E documentary about the films and books, and a featurette on film editing in Phoenix. The DVD-ROM features a timeline and a sneak peek of the next film, Harry Potter and the Half-Blood Prince (2009). The HD DVD and Blu-ray contain additional features, such as the "in-movie experience", a video commentary in which members of Dumbledore's Army share their favourite moments from the production of the film, and "focus points" featurettes on how certain scenes of the film were made. The HD DVD also includes an exclusive feature called "community screening", which enables owners of the HD DVD to watch the film together over the Internet. Order of the Phoenix was the seventh best-selling DVD of 2007, with 10.14 million units. The high-definition DVDs had combined sales of 179,500 copies, with more units coming from the Blu-ray version. The film overall made a revenue of $200.2 million from home video sales in the US.

There was also a third DVD with extras featuring a behind-the-scenes look at the sets of the movie. This can only be found in those purchased at Target stores (Future Shop in Canada) since it is a Target exclusive. The package included a one-time-only code that activated a digital copy of the film, which may be played on a computer with Windows Media Player. The digital copy is not playable on Macintosh or Apple Inc. iPod devices. This issue was partially addressed, with the film being made available on the iTunes Store in the UK but not the US.

== Reception ==
=== Box office ===
The film opened to a worldwide 5-day opening of $333 million, the fourteenth-biggest opening of all time. In the United States, tickets for hundreds of midnight showings of the film, bought from online ticket-seller Fandango, were sold out, making up approximately 90% of the site's weekly ticket sales. In the US and Canada, midnight screenings (very early morning on 11 July) brought in $12 million from 2,311 midnight exhibitions making the showings "the most successful batch of midnight exhibitions ever". In one-night earnings, Phoenix is behind only At World's End, which had debuted four hours earlier on its date. In studio documents leaked in July 2010, it was revealed the film "lost" Warner Bros. Pictures about $167 million.

In North America, Phoenix earned an additional $32.2 million on Wednesday, post-midnight showings, making it the biggest single-day Wednesday gross in box office history, with a total of $44.2 million from 4,285 theatres. That amount topped Sony Pictures' Spider-Man 2, which held the record since 2004 with its $40.4 million take on a Wednesday, until this record was broken in 2009 by Transformers: Revenge of the Fallen with $62 million. It was also the fifth-biggest opening day for a movie in history, at the time, surpassing At World's End's $42.9 million. It earned $1.9 million from a record-breaking 91 IMAX screens, the highest opening day ever for any IMAX day of the week, beating Spider-Man 3's $1.8 million. In the UK the result was similar. The film made £16.5 million during its opening 4-day run, breaking the UK box office record for the biggest 4-day opening weekend ever.

Phoenix's gross was at $292.4 million in the US and Canada, making it the fifth-highest-grossing film of 2007 in these regions, and at £49.2 million, or $101.4 million in the UK. Internationally, it has grossed $648 million, the seventh-highest grosser ever overseas, for a worldwide total of $942.9 million making it the second-highest-grossing film of the year closely behind Pirates of the Caribbean: At World's End's $960 million gross. It became the sixth-highest-grossing film in history at the time, the second-highest-grossing Potter film worldwide, and the second Potter film to break the $900 million mark, as well as the fourth-highest-grossing Potter film in the franchise behind Harry Potter and the Deathly Hallows – Part 2's $1.341 billion, Harry Potter and the Philosopher's Stone's $974 million, Harry Potter and the Deathly Hallows – Part 1's $960 million and the highest-grossing 2007 film in Australia and the UK. IMAX Corporation and Warner Bros. Pictures announced that the film has made over $35 million on IMAX screens, worldwide, with an impressive per-screen average of $243,000 making it the highest-grossing live-action IMAX release in history. In South Africa the film opened at number 1 with a total of $944,082.00, being screened at 87 theatres.

=== Critical response ===
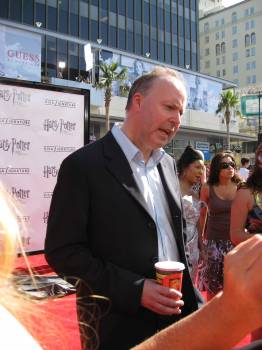
David Yates at the Hollywood premiere of Order of the Phoenix, July 2007. Yates was particularly praised for his transition from television to mainstream cinema; he had not directed a feature film prior to Order of the Phoenix.

On review aggregator Rotten Tomatoes the film has an approval rating of 78% based on 257 reviews, with an average rating of 6.9/10. The site's critical consensus reads, "It's not easy to take the longest Harry Potter book and streamline it into the shortest HP movie, but director David Yates does a bang up job of it, creating an Order of the Phoenix that's entertaining and action-packed." On Metacritic, the film has a score of 71 out of 100, based on 37 critics, indicating "generally favourable reviews". Audiences surveyed by CinemaScore gave the film an average grade of "A−" on an A+ to F scale.

Roger Ebert gave the film 2.5 of 4 stars saying "Harry no longer has as much joy." The review by Charles Frederick of The Telegraph was headlined "Potter film is the best and darkest yet". Colin Bertram of the New York Daily News gave the film four out of four stars, calling it the best Potter film yet and wrote that "die-hard Potter addicts will rejoice that Yates has distilled J. K. Rowling's broad universe with care and reverence". Mark Adams of The Sunday Mirror, while giving the film four out of five stars, called it "a dark and delicious delight [and] a must-see movie". Rene Rodriguez of The Miami Herald gave the film three stars out of four and wrote that the film "is the first installment in the soon-to-be series-of-seven that doesn't seem like just another spinoff capitalizing on the money-minting Harry Potter brand name. Instead, Phoenix feels like a real 'movie'".

Imelda Staunton's performance as Dolores Umbridge and Helena Bonham Carter's as Bellatrix Lestrange were widely acclaimed; Staunton was described as "coming close to stealing the show" by The Guardian and the "perfect choice for the part" and "one of the film's greatest pleasures" by Variety. Bonham Carter was said to be a "shining but underused talent" by The Times. Variety further praised Alan Rickman's portrayal of Severus Snape, writing that he "may have outdone himself; seldom has an actor done more with less than he does here". Newcomer Evanna Lynch, playing Luna Lovegood, also received good word from a number of reviewers, including The New York Times, which declared her "spellbinding".

Peter Travers of Rolling Stone also lauded the three principal actors' achievements, especially Radcliffe: "One of the joys of this film is watching Daniel Radcliffe grow so impressively into the role of Harry. He digs deep into the character and into Harry's nightmares. It's a sensational performance, touching all the bases from tender to fearful". Rolling Stone's review also classified the film as better than the previous four instalments in the series, by losing the "candy-ass aspect" of the first two and "raising the bar" from the "heat and resonance" of the third and fourth. Travers called the film "the best of the series so far, [with] the laughs, the jitters and the juice to make even nonbelievers wild about Harry".

Leo Lewis of The Times (London) expressed disappointment that the three main actors were not able to fully advance the emotional sides of their respective characters, weakening the film. The San Francisco Chronicle complained about a "lousy" storyline, alleging that the first twenty minutes of the film, when Harry is put on trial for performing magic outside of school and threatened with expulsion, but is cleared of all charges, did not advance the plot. Kirk Honeycutt of The Hollywood Reporter wrote that Phoenix is "quite possibly the least enjoyable of the [series] so far", and that despite "several eye-catching moments", "the magic – movie magic, that is – is mostly missing". The review also criticised the under use of the "cream of British acting", noting the brief appearances of Helena Bonham Carter, Maggie Smith, Emma Thompson, David Thewlis, Richard Griffiths, and Julie Walters.

=== Accolades ===
Before it was released, Order of the Phoenix was nominated in a new category at the 2007 MTV Movie Awards, Best Summer Movie You Haven't Seen Yet. On 26 August 2007, the film won the award for Choice Summer Movie – Drama/Action Adventure at the Teen Choice Awards.

The film was also nominated for several awards at the 2007 Scream Awards presented by Spike TV, in the categories of The Ultimate Scream, Best Fantasy Movie, and Best Sequel. Daniel Radcliffe was nominated in the Fantasy Hero categories, respectively. The film won for Best Sequel and Ralph Fiennes won for "Most Vile Villain". The film picked up three awards at the inaugural ITV National Movie Awards, taking Best Family Film, Best Actor for Radcliffe and Best Actress for Emma Watson. The film was one of ten nominees for a 2007 Hollywood Movie of the Year. It was also nominated for Best Live Action Family Film at the Broadcast Film Critics Association Awards and won the 2007 People's Choice Award for "Favorite Movie Drama". The production was also nominated for six awards at the 13th Empire Awards, organised by Empire, including Best Film, David Yates won Best Director. Yates later received the BAFTA Britannia Award for Artistic Excellence in Directing for his four Harry Potter films, which includes Order of the Phoenix.

Nicholas Hooper received a nomination for a World Soundtrack Discovery Award for his score to the film. Imelda Staunton was nominated in the "British Actress in a Supporting Role" category at the London Film Critics Circle Awards. At the 2008 BAFTA Awards, the film was nominated for "Best Production Design" and "Best Special Visual Effects". Order of the Phoenix was also nominated for the awards from the Art Directors Guild and Costume Designers Guild, and was awarded for "Outstanding Special Effects in a Motion Picture" by the Visual Effects Society out of six nominations. The British Academy Children's Awards (BAFTA) nominated Order of the Phoenix for Best Feature Film in 2007 and the Hugo Awards nominated the film for Best Dramatic Presentation (Long Form) in 2008.

== See also ==
- List of films about witchcraft
