= Newt Scamander =

Protagonist of the Fantastic Beasts films

- Fantastic Beasts character
- Eddie Redmayne as Newt Scamander
- First appearance: Fantastic Beasts and Where to Find Them (2016)
- Last appearance: Fantastic Beasts: The Secrets of Dumbledore (2022)
- Created by: J. K. Rowling
- Portrayed by: Eddie Redmayne; Joshua Shea (teenaged version in The Crimes of Grindelwald)

In-universe information
- Full name: Newton Artemis Fido Scamander
- Nickname: Newt
- Occupation: Magizoologist
- Spouse: Porpentina Goldstein
- Children: Unidentified son
- Relatives: Theseus Scamander (brother); Mrs. Scamander (mother); Mr. Scamander (father); Rolf Scamander (grandson); Luna Lovegood (granddaughter-in-law); Lorcan Scamander (great-grandson); Lysander Scamander (great-grandson)
- Nationality: British
- House: Hufflepuff
- Boggart: Office Job
- Born: 24 February 1897

Newton Artemis Fido "Newt" Scamander is a character created by J. K. Rowling. He is the protagonist of the Fantastic Beasts film series, a spin-off prequel to the Harry Potter novel and film series.

Newt Scamander was only mentioned in Harry Potter and the Philosopher's Stone as the author of the book Fantastic Beasts and Where to Find Them, which was used as a textbook for Care of Magical Creatures by Harry Potter and his classmates. In 2001, J.K. Rowling wrote a real version of the fictional textbook under the pseudonym "Newt Scamander". In the film series inspired by the book, Newt Scamander is the main character and is portrayed by Eddie Redmayne.

Newt Scamander is an introverted British wizard and magizoologist. His help is often sought by his former professor Albus Dumbledore in the mission to defeat the dark wizard Gellert Grindelwald. Newt ends up playing a vital role in the downfall of Grindelwald, during which Newt meets and falls in love with his future wife Tina Goldstein.

Rowling as a producer, as well as scriptwriter, had a much greater involvement in the casting of Fantastic Beasts films than she did in the Harry Potter films. She quickly came to see that Redmayne met with her ideas for the character of Newt as a very British subtle and understated hero figure. Redmayne's portrayal of the character received strong critical reviews in the U.K., but reactions from critics in the U.S. were more mixed as his subtlety of character did not fit the American ideal cast of hero.

== Character development ==
Describing Newt as an outsider, Rowling said, "My heroes are always people who feel themselves to be set apart, stigmatised or othered. That's at the heart of most of what I write, and it's certainly at the heart of Fantastic Beasts and Where to Find Them.

Newt Scamander grows up attached to the magical beasts since childhood and eventually becomes a magizoologist. He feels extremely connected to all his magical creatures and beasts, and always defends them.

Harry Potter and Newt Scamander are rather different kinds of protagonists: Harry is a born leader who makes lifelong, unbreakable friendships at Hogwarts; while Newt is an unheroic hero, (but not an antihero), a loner and always thought of himself to be alone because his only close friendship is with Leta Lestrange that ended due to "rocky circumstances". Harry is daring, reckless, and short-tempered at times; while Newt usually remains calm and cool in a crisis. However, Newt and Harry also share similar traits, as they are both brave, humble, loyal, protecting of underdogs, at odds with authority — mainly in the form of the Ministry of Magic — and fighting for what is right. Both Harry and Newt are "chosen" to fight evils: the bold Harry is chosen by his fate and guided by Dumbledore to complete his parents' fight; whereas Dumbledore sees a rather reluctant and bashful Newt just needs a little push to be convinced into just following his own innate instincts to do the right thing and fight Grindelwald.

Newt is also somewhat similar to Hermione Granger as both of them are intelligent and deductive — crusaders with "extraordinary luggage".

== Character biography ==
=== Early life ===
Born in England on 24 February 1897, Newt Scamander developed interest towards magical beasts and creatures from a young age as his mother bred hippogriffs. Sorted into Hufflepuff at Hogwarts at the age of eleven, Newt develops a close friendship with a Slytherin girl named Leta Lestrange, who is in the same year as him and shares both his interest in magical beasts and his inferiority complex due to being an outsider. Newt and Leta explore magical creatures together and enjoy each other's company, gradually falling in love. One of Leta's experiments involving a Jarvey accidentally endangers human life. Newt takes the blame for Leta's actions and is expelled from Hogwarts instead of her. Therefore, Newt turns bitter towards Leta but still remains much in love with her. Albus Dumbledore, Newt's Transfiguration professor at that time, strongly argues on his beloved student's behalf. Newt is still expelled but is allowed to keep his wand because of Dumbledore's influence.

Around 1914 to 1918, Newt serves on the Eastern front during the First World War in a confidential Ministry of Magic program involving Ukrainian Ironbelly dragons. However, the program is cancelled as the dragons respond only to Newt, whilst trying to eat all others. Newt later joins the Ministry and receives several promotions there due to his knowledge about magical creatures, eventually becoming a magizoologist. However, Newt's career choice is not appreciated by his family. In 1918, Newt is convinced by Augustus Worme to use his extensive knowledge about magical beasts to write a book on them. Newt begins to travel internationally to conduct research on magical beasts and creatures for his book.

=== Fantastic Beasts and Where to Find Them ===
In 1926, Newt Scamander makes a brief stop over in New York with the motive of releasing Frank the Thunderbird into its habitat. Newt carries with him a magically expanded suitcase in which he carries several magical beasts from his voyage around the world. In a chain of chaotic events, Newt's suitcase is accidentally switched with the suitcase of Muggle (or No-maj) aspiring baker Jacob Kowalski; Jacob opens the suitcase and accidentally lets out the magical beasts. Newt teams up with Jacob, American ex-auror Porpentina "Tina" Goldstein, and Tina's Legilimens sister Queenie, to round up all the escaped creatures. Newt faces complications from MACUSA (Magical Congress of the United States of America) but nonetheless succeeds in rounding up all the escaped creatures with Jacob, Tina and Queenie's help. When Queenie learns of Newt's past through her Legillimency, she advises him to move on, describing Leta Lestrange as a "taker".

Newt encounters a destructive and emotionally disturbed obscurial teenager Credence Barebone, whom Newt attempts to comfort and consoles with the aid of Tina (who attempted to help him before). When MACUSA aurors attack Credence and blast the Obscurial to oblivion, Newt is the only one who notices that a tiny wisp of the Obscurus flees (likely to find another host). Newt exposes that MACUSA auror Percival Graves is the infamous and dangerous dark wizard Gellert Grindelwald in disguise; Grindelwald is arrested. Newt prevents the exposure of wizarding world to the No-maj community by using his thunderbird to disperse a potion which removes all the No-maj's memories about the Obscurial battle. Newt receives respect and a sincere apology from MACUSA. Newt bids Jacob an emotional farewell before the latter willingly steps into the rain of obliviating potion. Newt argues on Tina's behalf and justifies her mistake because of which she had been fired; thereafter, Tina gets back her job as an auror. A week later, Newt anonymously gifts Jacob some silver Occamy shells to help him sanction a loan and fulfill his dream of opening a bakery. Newt bids farewell to Tina and promises to deliver a copy of his book to her in person, before he boards a ship to England and leaves.

=== Fantastic Beasts: The Crimes of Grindelwald ===
In 1927, Newt Scamander's book Fantastic Beasts and Where To Find Them has become a bestseller and an approved Hogwarts textbook. In the meantime, Grindelwald has escaped custody. Albus Dumbledore secretly meets Newt and asks him to track and save Credence (now known by everyone to be alive). Newt is disappointed to learn from Queenie that a crestfallen Tina is dating someone after mistakenly thinking that Newt is engaged to Leta Lestrange, whereas Leta is actually engaged to Newt's elder brother Theseus.

Learning that Tina is also searching for Credence in France, Newt goes there as well with Jacob (who has regained memories about the wizarding world). Due to an international travel ban placed on him by the Ministry, illegally Newt bribes a portkey tout on the Kent coast and arrives directly in Paris with Jacob. Both follow a wizard named Yusuf Kama, only to find Tina being held hostage by Kama. Unexpectedly, Kama collapses due to a parasitical infection and Newt's pet bowtruckle, Pickett, frees the three by picking the lock.

Newt captures a Zouwu, that had escaped earlier from a travelling circus, running rampant across the Parisian streets. Then the three take the unconscious Kama to Dumbledore's safe-house run by the alchemist Nicholas Flamel where Newt extracts the dragon worm that has infected Kama, so curing him. Tina, still put-out by Newt and his supposed engagement leaves, followed shortly after by Newt to infiltrate the French Ministry of Magic to uncover information about Credence's past. Eventually, Newt tells Tina that he is not engaged to Leta. He awkwardly tries to confess to Tina that he has fallen in love with her, but nervously blurts that she has "eyes as a fire under water" — like salamanders, they say together — at which Tina's affections are rekindled. At the Lestrange family tomb in Père Lachaise Cemetery, as Leta comes clean about a past mistake of hers to absolve Credence from Yusuf Kama unbreakable vow, Newt consoles a remorseful Leta as a good friend. Newt chooses to join the fight against Grindelwald after a destructive rally of Grindelwald's followers, during which Queenie and Credence join Grindelwald under manipulation, while Leta sacrifices her life to let her fiancé Theseus and the others escape. Flamel leads the escapees in saving Paris from a fiery destruction.

In an epilogue at Hogwarts, Newt presents Dumbledore with a magical silver vial stolen from Grindelwald by Newt's niffler, containing a blood oath pact Grindelwald and Dumbledore made in their youth that prevents them from dueling one another; Dumbledore believes it can be destroyed.

=== Fantastic Beasts: The Secrets of Dumbledore ===
In 1932, Newt Scamander nurses a pregnant Qilin, who births twins. Grindelwald's acolytes kill the mother Qilin and capture one of the twins, whom Grindelwald slaughters to gain precognition. However, Newt saves the younger Qilin twin and keeps him safe.

Albus Dumbledore entrusts Newt to form and lead a group to thwart Grindelwald's plans of world domination. Newt forms a team consisting of his auror brother Theseus, Muggle friend Jacob Kowalski, Ilvermorny Charms professor Eulalie "Lally" Hicks, his assistant Bunty and Yusuf Kama. Newt presents Jacob with a wand as per Dumbledore's orders, much to Jacob's surprise and joy. Newt, Jacob, Lally and Theseus are all shocked when Grindelwald is acquitted of all charges and is also allowed to stand in the upcoming election as a candidate. After Theseus is stunned and abducted by Grindelwald's acolytes, Newt infiltrates German prison Erkstag and rescues his brother. At Hog's head, Dumbledore reveals to Newt that Credence Barebone is actually the illegitimate son of his younger brother Aberforth Dumbledore. Newt attempts to comfort a guilt-ridden Dumbledore but in vain. However before leaving, Newt tells Dumbledore that he has a chance to correct his mistakes.

Newt, Theseus, Jacob, Lally, Bunty and Dumbledore reach Bhutan where the election for the new supreme mugwump is held. Grindelwald manipulates the election and deceitfully wins. But with Credence's help, Newt exposes that the Qilin which chose Grindelwald was already dead, reanimated through necromancy. Newt releases the remaining alive Qilin, which chooses Vicência Santos as the new Supreme Mugwump. Enraged and defeated, Grindelwald flees, but not before his and Dumbledore's blood pact is broken in a chain of spells. Dumbledore sincerely thanks Newt for all his help; Aberforth accepts a dying Credence and takes him home. As Queenie regrets joining Grindelwald and renounces the dark side, she and Jacob marry. Newt attends the wedding as Jacob's best man. Newt is gladdened and rendered speechless to see his love-interest Tina there as well. The two reunite and attend the wedding together.

=== Later life ===
At some time after the end of the Global Wizarding War, Newt and Tina marry. Newt creates the Werewolf Register and the Ban on Experimental Breeding. Newt also works for the Dragon Research and Restraint Bureau. In 1979, he is awarded The Order of Merlin - Second Class for his services to magizoology. He appears on a Chocolate Frog Card. His grandson Rolf Scamander—a naturalist by profession—goes on to marry Luna Lovegood. Soon, Newt becomes the great-grandfather of twins Lorcan and Lysander.

As depicted in Harry Potter and the Prisoner of Azkaban, Newt Scamander visits Hogwarts in 1993 or 1994 for some unknown reason, thus appearing on the Marauder's Map. Newt writes A Children's Anthology of Monsters, an edition for younger readers. As of 2017, Newt Scamander is still "alive and well".

== Reception ==
The character received mixed reaction. Newt Scamander was chosen by IGN as their fifteenth favourite Harry Potter character, saying that Newt has very quickly established himself as a "very different sort of hero".

Cultural critic Jonathan McIntosh praised the character, stating that he "performs a refreshingly atypical form of masculinity." Joshua Hansen from MuggleNet liked Newt Scamander more than Harry Potter and said, "Don't get me wrong, Harry is still dear to my heart [...] But when ranking whom I prefer, the man with the lizard [sic] for a name definitely takes the cake." An editor from Looper approved of how Newt's character helped the Hufflepuff house to "step into the limelight". Reviewer from The Guardian enjoyed Newt Scamander's personality and said, "All pigeon-toed angles and stuttering rushes of enthusiasm, [Eddie Redmayne's] great gift to the character is a crippling diffidence."

Eddie Redmayne, the actor who portrayed Newt Scamander throughout the films, also received positive reception. For his role in Fantastic Beasts and Where To Find Them, Redmayne received the Best Actor Award from Empire Awards.

Many critics disapproved of Redmayne’s interpretation of the character. Helen O'Hara from Empire wrote, "[...] he's so disconnected and withdrawn that he barely shifts facial expression from friendly blankness for the first half hour, when we really need him to guide us around." Justin Chang of the Los Angeles Times described Newt Scamander as "charmless". Charles Bramesco of Polygon criticised how Newt Scamander has "been remanded to the margins of his own franchise".

== Characterisation ==
=== Outward appearance ===
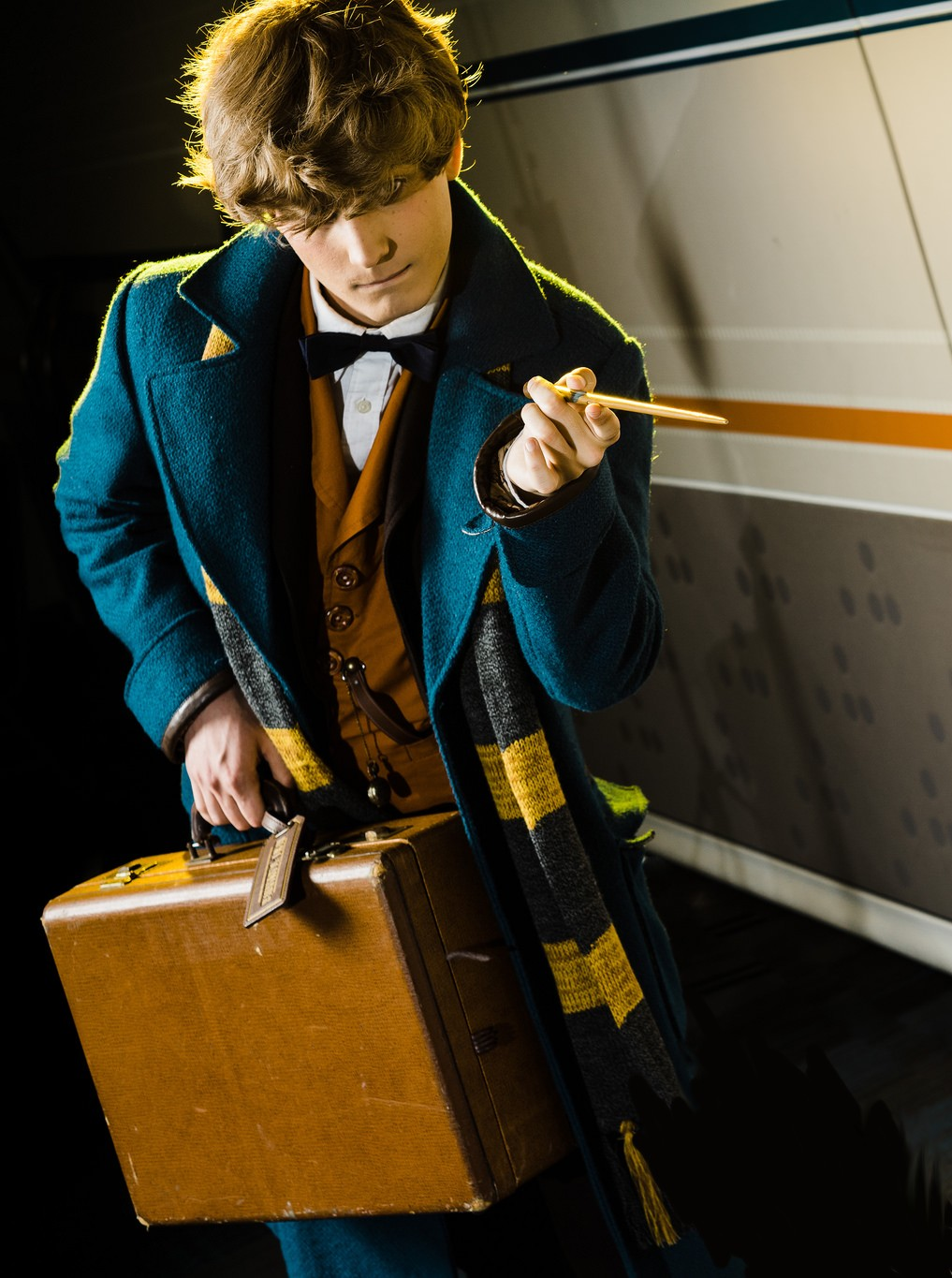
A person cosplaying as Newt Scamander

Newt Scamander is a tall wizard with brown hair and hazel eyes.

Newt almost always wears his single-breasted, close-fitting, peacock blue overcoat, which covers his body down to his knees. Newt's primary dressing-manner also includes his dark brown suit jacket and trousers, burnt-orange waistcoat, ivory-white shirt, small bow tie and calf high leather boots which are weather-beaten and worn from his travels across the world. The various pockets in Newt's coat contain various potions and elixirs for Newt as a magizoologist always remains prepared.

Occasionally, he is also seen wearing his woollen black-and-yellow Hufflepuff scarf.

=== Personality ===
Eddie Redmayne expressed his thoughts about Newt Scamander possibly being on the autism spectrum. Socially awkward, slightly eccentric and introverted around humans, Newt feels more comfortable around animals and connects better with them. Newt's relationships with his magical beasts sometimes takes precedence over his relationships with other human beings. However, Newt does not lack empathy towards humans as his beliefs about the power of Muggles and his remarkable friendship with Muggle Jacob Kowalski "mirrors a certain Albus Dumbledore".

Newt is not afraid to show weakness, vulnerability or emotions. He attempts to avoid violence when possible, such as when he consoles the violently disturbed obscurial Credence Barebone by his kind, understanding and sympathetic nature. Newt is praised by his former headmaster Albus Dumbledore for always doing the right thing without seeking power or glory.

Newt has a scientist's eye and the thirst for knowledge about magical creatures, with the motive of protecting them and educating others about them. Newt "bumbles" into the heart of danger, especially if a mysterious species is involved. Newt is fascinated by all sorts of magical creatures—those by which wizards and witches are deeply terrified.

=== Magical abilities and skills ===
Newt's expertise in Charms is seen as he is able to perform a highly-advanced Undetectable Extension Charm on the interior of his suitcase to expand the space within and hold innumerable magical creatures of different native habitats. He is also able to cast Atmospheric Charms to create separate natural habitats inside the suitcase for the magical beasts to survive. He is even able to create a magical bubble to contain and sustain an obscurus even after the death of its host. He could also successfully use a tracking spell, which he used to trace Tina.

Newt is particularly gifted in Herbology and Healing as he is capable of preparing medicinal remedies from magical plants and potions — such as when he swiftly creates a poultice through some fresh plants and some preprepared concoctions to control Jacob's unusually severe reaction to a Murtlap bite. Newt also looked after magical flora and was familiar with their properties, keeping several potted plants on a shelf in his shed in the magically expanded suitcase that serves as his home for his magical creatures.

Polyjuice Potion is regarded as highly difficult to make. Since Newt was successfully able to brew the potion, it suggests that he is skilled in potion-making as well.

Newt Scamander's wand is made up of rather unusual contents: The wood of the wand is of Tropical Lime Tree, while shell and bone are used as cores of the wand. Newt's boggart is an office desk at the Ministry, because what he fears most is having to work in an office. When Rowling was asked by a fan regarding the form of Newt's patronus, she left it unrevealed for suspense.

== Film portrayal ==
In the film series, Newt Scamander is portrayed by Eddie Redmayne. Both J. K. Rowling and David Heyman stated that Eddie Redmayne was their "first and only choice" for portraying Newt Scamander. "Not only does he look as if he lives in 1926, but he has all the elements required to be Newt: he's smart, funny, utterly British, and immensely sympathetic [...]" said David Heyman.

Redmayne chose the character's wand himself from a number of different designs because he loved that it was "very simple" and "made of organic materials". Redmayne took the Patronus quiz on Pottermore twice and both times got the same result: a Basset Hound patronus.

During Fantastic Beasts: The Crimes of Grindelwald, Newt Scamander as a teenager is portrayed by British child artist Joshua Shea.
