= Harry Potter and the Chamber of Secrets =

1998 fantasy novel by J. K. Rowling

- Jacket art of the original UK edition
- Author: J. K. Rowling
- Illustrator: Cliff Wright (first edition)
- Language: English and others
- Series: Harry Potter
- Release number: 2nd in series
- Genre: Fantasy
- Set in: United Kingdom
- Publisher: Bloomsbury (UK)
- Publication date: 2 July 1998
- Publication place: United Kingdom
- Pages: 251 (first edition)
- ISBN: 0-7475-3849-2
- Preceded by: Harry Potter and the Philosopher's Stone
- Followed by: Harry Potter and the Prisoner of Azkaban

Harry Potter and the Chamber of Secrets is a fantasy novel by British author J. K. Rowling. The second novel in the Harry Potter series, it chronicles Harry Potter's second year at Hogwarts School of Witchcraft and Wizardry. After several residents of the school are attacked and magically immobilised, Harry and his friends Ron and Hermione investigate.

The book was published in the United Kingdom on 2 July 1998 by Bloomsbury and later in the United States on 2 June 1999 by Scholastic Inc. Although Rowling says she found it difficult to finish the book, it won high praise and awards from critics, young readers, and the book industry, although some critics thought the story was perhaps too frightening for younger children. Much like with other novels in the series, Harry Potter and the Chamber of Secrets triggered religious debates; some religious authorities have condemned its use of magical themes, whereas others have praised its emphasis on self-sacrifice and the way one's character is the result of one's choices.

Several commentators have noted that personal identity is a strong theme in the book and that it addresses issues of racism through the treatment of non-human, non-magical, and non-living people. Some commentators regard the story's diary that writes back as a warning against uncritical acceptance of information from sources whose motives and reliability cannot be checked. Institutional authority is portrayed as self-serving and incompetent.

The film adaptation of the novel, released in 2002, became (at the time) the fifth highest-grossing film ever and received generally favourable reviews. Video games loosely based on Harry Potter and the Chamber of Secrets were also released for several platforms, and most obtained favourable reviews.

== Plot ==
While spending the summer of 1992 with the Dursleys, the twelve-year-old Harry Potter is visited by Dobby, a house-elf. Dobby says Harry is in danger and must promise not to return to Hogwarts. When Harry refuses, Dobby uses magic to destroy a pudding made by Aunt Petunia. Believing that Harry created the mess, Uncle Vernon locks him in his room. The Ministry of Magic sends a notice accusing Harry of performing underage magic and threatening to expel him from Hogwarts if it happens again.

The Weasley brothers Ron, Fred, and George arrive in their father's flying car and take Harry to their home. When Harry and the Weasleys go to Diagon Alley for school supplies, they meet Gilderoy Lockhart, a celebrity author who is the new Defence Against the Dark Arts professor. At King's Cross station, Harry and Ron cannot enter Platform 9¾ to board the Hogwarts Express, so they fly to Hogwarts in the enchanted car.

During the 1992-1993 school year, Harry hears a strange voice emanating from the castle walls. Argus Filch's cat is found magically immobilised, along with a warning scrawled on the wall: "The Chamber of Secrets has been opened. Enemies of the heir, beware". Harry learns that the Chamber supposedly houses a monster that attacks Muggle-born students, and which only the Heir of Slytherin can control. During a Quidditch match, a rogue Bludger strikes Harry, breaking his arm. Professor Lockhart botches an attempt to mend the injury, which sends Harry to the hospital wing. Dobby visits Harry and reveals that he jinxed the Bludger and sealed the portal at King's Cross. He also tells Harry that house-elves are bound to serve a master, and cannot be freed unless their master gives them clothing.

After another attack from the monster, students attend a defensive duelling class. During the class, Harry displays the rare ability to speak Parseltongue, the language of snakes. Moaning Myrtle, a ghost who haunts a bathroom, shows Harry and his friends a diary that was left in her stall. It belonged to Tom Riddle, a student who witnessed another student's death when the Chamber was last opened. During the next attack by the monster, Hermione Granger is immobilised.

Harry and Ron learn that the monster is a Basilisk, a gigantic snake that can kill victims with a direct gaze and immobilise them with an indirect gaze. Harry realizes the Basilisk is producing the voice that he hears in the walls. After Ron's sister Ginny is abducted and taken into the Chamber, Harry and Ron discover the Chamber entrance in Myrtle's bathroom. When they force Lockhart to enter with them, he confesses that the stories he told of his heroic adventures are fabrications. He attempts to erase the boys's memories, but his spell backfires and obliterates his own memory.

Harry finds Ginny unconscious in the Chamber. A manifestation of Tom Riddle appears and reveals that Riddle is Lord Voldemort and the Heir of Slytherin. After explaining that he opened the Chamber, Riddle summons the Basilisk to kill Harry. Dumbledore's phoenix Fawkes arrives, bringing Harry the Sorting Hat. While Fawkes blinds the Basilisk, Harry pulls the Sword of Gryffindor from the Hat. He slays the serpent, then stabs the diary with a Basilisk fang, destroying it and the manifestation of Riddle. Later, Harry liberates Dobby by tricking his master, Lucius Malfoy, into giving him clothing. At the end of the novel, the immobilised students are cured and Gryffindor wins the House Cup.

== Publication and reception ==
=== Development ===
J. K. Rowling found it difficult to finish Harry Potter and the Chamber of Secrets because she was afraid it would not live up to the expectations raised by Harry Potter and the Philosopher's Stone. After delivering the manuscript to Bloomsbury Publishing on schedule, she took it back for six weeks of revision.

In early drafts of the book, the ghost Nearly Headless Nick sang a self-composed song explaining his condition and the circumstances of his unknown death. This was cut because the book's editor did not care for the poem, which has been subsequently published as an extra on J. K. Rowling's official website. The family background of Dean Thomas was removed because Rowling and her publishers considered it an "unnecessary digression" and she considered Neville Longbottom's own journey of discovery "more important to the central plot".

Gilderoy Lockhart's character was inspired by an acquaintance of Rowling who was, in her words, "even more objectionable than his fictional counterpart" and "used to tell whopping great fibs about his past life, all of them designed to demonstrate what a wonderful, brave and brilliant person he was".

=== Publication ===
Harry Potter and the Chamber of Secrets was published in the UK on 2 July 1998 and in the US on 2 June 1999. It immediately took first place in UK bestseller lists, displacing popular authors such as John Grisham, Tom Clancy and Terry Pratchett, and making Rowling the first author to win the British Book Awards Children's Book of the Year for two years in succession. In June 1999, it went straight to the top of three US bestseller lists, including in The New York Times.

First edition printings had several errors, which were fixed in subsequent reprints. Initially, Albus Dumbledore said Lord Voldemort was the last remaining ancestor of Salazar Slytherin instead of his descendant. Gilderoy Lockhart's book on werewolves is entitled Weekends with Werewolves at one point and Wanderings with Werewolves later in the book.

=== Critical response ===
In The Times, Deborah Loudon described it as a children's book that would be "re-read into adulthood" and highlighted its "strong plots, engaging characters, excellent jokes and a moral message which flows naturally from the story". Fantasy author Charles de Lint agreed, and considered the second Harry Potter book to be just as good as Harry Potter and the Philosopher's Stone, a rare achievement among series of books. Thomas Wagner regarded the plot as very similar to that of the first book, based on searching for a secret hidden under the school. However, he enjoyed the parody of celebrities and their fans that centres round Gilderoy Lockhart, and approved of the book's handling of racism. Tammy Nezol found the book more disturbing than its predecessor, particularly in the rash behaviour of Harry and his friends after Harry withholds information from Dumbledore, and in the human-like behaviour of the mandrakes used to make a potion that cures immobilisation. Nevertheless, she considered the second story as enjoyable as the first.

Mary Stuart thought the final conflict with Tom Riddle in the Chamber was almost as scary as in some of Stephen King's works, and perhaps too strong for young or timid children. She commented that "there are enough surprises and imaginative details thrown in as would normally fill five lesser books." Like other reviewers, she thought the book would give pleasure to both children and adult readers. According to Philip Nel, the early reviews gave unalloyed praise while the later ones included some criticisms, although they still agreed that the book was outstanding.

Writing after all seven books had been published, Graeme Davis regarded Harry Potter and the Chamber of Secrets as the weakest of the series, and agreed that the plot structure is much the same as in Harry Potter and the Philosopher's Stone. He described Fawkes's appearance to arm Harry and then to heal him as a deus ex machina: he said that the book does not explain how Fawkes knew where to find Harry; and Fawkes's timing had to be very precise, as arriving earlier would probably have prevented the battle with the basilisk, while arriving later would have been fatal to Harry and Ginny.

=== Awards and honours ===
Rowling's Harry Potter and the Chamber of Secrets was the recipient of several awards. The American Library Association listed the novel among its 2000 Notable Children's Books, as well as its Best Books for Young Adults. In 1999, Booklist named Harry Potter and the Chamber of Secrets as one of its Editors' Choices, and as one of its Top Ten Fantasy Novels for Youth. The Cooperative Children's Book Center made the novel a CCBC Choice of 2000 in the "Fiction for Children" category. The novel also won Children's Book of the Year British Book Award, and was shortlisted for the 1998 Guardian Children's Award and the 1998 Carnegie Award.

Harry Potter and the Chamber of Secrets won the Nestlé Smarties Book Prize 1998 Gold Medal in the 9–11 years division. Rowling also won two other Nestlé Smarties Book Prizes for Harry Potter and the Philosopher's Stone and Harry Potter and the Prisoner of Azkaban. The Scottish Arts Council awarded their first ever Children's Book Award to the novel in 1999, and it was also awarded Whitaker's Platinum Book Award in 2001. In 2003, the novel was listed at number 23 on the BBC's survey The Big Read.

== Main themes ==
Harry Potter and the Chamber of Secrets continues to examine what makes a person who they are, which began in the first book. As well as maintaining that Harry's identity is shaped by his decisions rather than any aspect of his birth, Harry Potter and the Chamber of Secrets provides contrasting characters who try to conceal their true personalities: as Tammy Nezol puts it, Gilderoy Lockhart "lacks any real identity" because he is nothing more than a charming liar. Riddle also complicates Harry's struggle to understand himself by pointing out the similarities between the two: "both half-bloods, orphans raised by Muggles, probably the only two Parselmouths to come to Hogwarts since the great Slytherin."

Opposition to class, death and its impacts, experiencing adolescence, sacrifice, love, friendship, loyalty, prejudice, and racism are constant themes of the series. In Harry Potter and the Chamber of Secrets Harry's consideration and respect for others extends to the lowly, non-human Dobby and the ghost Nearly Headless Nick. According to Marguerite Krause, achievements in the novel depend more on ingenuity and hard work than on natural talents.

Edward Duffy, associate professor at Marquette University, says that one of the central characters of Chamber of Secrets is Tom Riddle's enchanted diary, which takes control of Ginny Weasley – just as Riddle planned. Duffy suggests Rowling intended this as a warning against passively consuming information from sources that have their own agendas. Although Bronwyn Williams and Amy Zenger regard the diary as more like an instant messaging or chat room system, they agree about the dangers of relying too much on the written word, which can camouflage the author, and they highlight a comical example, Lockhart's self-promoting books.

Antonello Fabio Caterino, an Italian forensic linguist and philologist, stated that the conversations Harry and Voldemort had through the diary could be considered a "modern transposition" of Petrarca's Secretum, a text often compared to a diary, which details an imaginary dialogue between the writer and Augustine of Hippo. Caterino analysed similarities between themes found in both books, starting from the idea of a fragmented soul: Harry and Voldemort are both seeking Voldemort's Horcruxes, which are fragments of his soul, and Petrarca also focuses on the concept animae fragmenta, meaning soul's fragments.

Immorality and the portrayal of authority as negative are significant themes in the novel. Marguerite Krause states there are few absolute moral rules in Harry Potter's world, for example Harry prefers to tell the truth, but lies whenever he considers it necessary – very like his enemy Draco Malfoy. At the end of Harry Potter and the Chamber of Secrets, Dumbledore retracts his promise to punish Harry and Ron if they break any more school rules – after Professor McGonagall estimates they have broken over 100 – and lavishly rewards them for ending the threat from the Chamber of Secrets. Krause further states that authority figures and political institutions receive little respect from Rowling. William MacNeil of Griffith University, Queensland, Australia states that the Minister for Magic is presented as a mediocrity. In his article "Harry Potter and the Secular City", Ken Jacobson suggests the Ministry as a whole is portrayed as a tangle of bureaucratic empires, saying that "Ministry officials busy themselves with minutiae (e.g. standardising cauldron thicknesses) and coin politically correct euphemisms like 'non-magical community' (for Muggles) and 'memory modification' (for magical brainwashing)."

This novel implies it begins in 1992: the cake for Nearly-Headless Nick's 500th deathday party bears the words "Sir Nicholas De Mimsy Porpington died 31 October 1492".

=== Connection to Harry Potter and the Half-Blood Prince ===
Chamber of Secrets has many links with the sixth book of the series, Harry Potter and the Half-Blood Prince. In fact, Half-Blood Prince was the working title of Chamber of Secrets and Rowling says she originally intended to present some "crucial pieces of information" in the second book, but ultimately felt "this information's proper home was book six". Some objects that play significant roles in Half-Blood Prince first appear in Chamber of Secrets: the Hand of Glory and the opal necklace that are on sale in Borgin and Burkes; a Vanishing Cabinet in Hogwarts that is damaged by Peeves the Poltergeist; and Tom Riddle's diary, which is later revealed to be a Horcrux. The plot of Half-Blood Prince also strongly features a motif of a mysterious book that conveys information both useful and dangerous (Professor Snape’s old Potions textbook from his time in school). Additionally, these two novels are the ones with the most focus on Harry's relationship with Ginny Weasley.

== Adaptations ==
=== Film ===
The film version of Harry Potter and the Chamber of Secrets was released in 2002. Chris Columbus directed the film, and the screenplay was written by Steve Kloves. It became the third film to exceed $600 million in international box office sales, preceded by Titanic, released in 1997, and Harry Potter and the Philosopher's Stone, released in 2001. The film was nominated for a Saturn Award for the Best Fantasy Film, According to Metacritic, the film version of Harry Potter and the Chamber of Secrets received "generally favourable reviews" with an average score of 63%, and another aggregator, Rotten Tomatoes, gave it a score of 82%.

=== Video games ===
Five unique video games by different developers were released between 2002 and 2003 by Electronic Arts, loosely based on the book:

Developer	Release date	Platform	Genre	GameRankings	Metacritic	Notes
KnowWonder	14 November 2002	Windows	Adventure/puzzle	71.46%	77/100	
Argonaut	14 November 2002	PlayStation	Action-adventure	70.50%	74/100	
Griptonite	14 November 2002	Game Boy Color	Role-playing game	77.33%	—N/a	
Eurocom	14 November 2002	Game Boy Advance	Action puzzle	73.44%	76/100	
Eurocom	14 November 2002	GameCube	Action-adventure	73.29%	77/100	
Eurocom	14 November 2002	PlayStation 2	Action-adventure	70.44%	71/100	
Eurocom	14 November 2002	Xbox	Action-adventure	74.58%	77/100	
Aspyr	10 April 2003	Mac OS X	Adventure/puzzle	—N/a	—N/a	Port of Windows version
