= Fantastic Beasts: Cases from the Wizarding World =

2016 video game

- App icon
- Developers: Mediatonic; WB Games San Francisco
- Publisher: Warner Bros. Interactive Entertainment
- Series: Wizarding World
- Platforms: Android, iOS
- Release: November 17, 2016
- Genre: Hidden object
- Mode: Single-player

Fantastic Beasts: Cases from the Wizarding World is a 2016 hidden object video game developed by Mediatonic and WB Games San Francisco, and published by Warner Bros. Interactive Entertainment.

The game was released for Android and iOS on November 17, 2016. It was removed from the App Store and Google Play on December 10, 2019, and was officially closed on January 14, 2020.

== Gameplay ==
In Fantastic Beasts: Cases From the Wizarding World, the player controls a new recruit of the Beast Division in the Department for the Regulation and Control of Magical Creatures of the Ministry of Magic. Visiting locations like Diagon Alley, Hogsmeade and The Leaky Cauldron, the player investigates unexplained happenings by discovering hidden objects, analyzing evidence, casting spells and brewing potions, to uncover and protect the magical creatures at the center of every mysterious case.

== Development ==
The game was developed by British studio Mediatonic in partnership with WB Games San Francisco. Developers of the game visited Warner Bros. Studio Tour London – The Making of Harry Potter to replicate as close as they could get objects appearing in the Harry Potter film series.

== Release ==
The game was released for Android and iOS on November 17, 2016. It was released a day before the theatrical release of the film Fantastic Beasts and Where to Find Them.

== Reception ==
Common Sense Media gave a score of three out of five stars and wrote: "Though the love of Rowling's world and the app's premise are strong, a good chunk of the magical fun is sapped by poor design choices and/or the publisher's aggressive money-making scheme." Gamezebo also gave the same score and said: "[...] it's perfectly fine, and it's going to find a sizable audience. It just doesn't fizz and sparkle with the sort of magic you might be expecting."
