= Harry Potter and the Order of the Phoenix =

2003 fantasy novel by J. K. Rowling

- Cover art of the original UK edition
- Author: J. K. Rowling
- Illustrator: Jason Cockcroft (first edition)
- Language: English
- Series: Harry Potter
- Release number: 5th in series
- Genre: Fantasy
- Publisher: Bloomsbury (UK)
- Publication date: 21 June 2003
- Publication place: United Kingdom
- Pages: 766 (first edition)
- ISBN: 0-7475-5100-6
- Preceded by: Harry Potter and the Goblet of Fire
- Followed by: Harry Potter and the Half-Blood Prince

Harry Potter and the Order of the Phoenix is a fantasy novel by British author J. K. Rowling. It is the fifth and longest novel in the Harry Potter series. It follows Harry Potter's struggles through his fifth year at Hogwarts School of Witchcraft and Wizardry, including the surreptitious return of the antagonist Lord Voldemort, O.W.L. exams, and an obstructive Ministry of Magic. The novel was published on 21 June 2003 by Bloomsbury in the United Kingdom, Scholastic in the United States, and Raincoast in Canada. It sold five million copies in the first 24 hours of publication.

Harry Potter and the Order of the Phoenix won several awards, including the American Library Association Best Book Award for Young Adults in 2003. The book was also made into a 2007 film, and a video game by Electronic Arts.

== Plot ==
During the summer, Harry is frustrated by the lack of communication from his friends and by Dumbledore's refusal to let him help in the struggle against Lord Voldemort. One evening, Dementors attack him and his cousin Dudley, but Harry fends them off using the Patronus Charm. Later, members of the Order of the Phoenix arrive at the Dursley residence and take Harry to Number 12, Grimmauld Place. Number 12 is Sirius Black's family home and the headquarters of the Order, which is a secret organisation founded by Dumbledore to fight Voldemort and his Death Eaters. Harry wants to join the Order, but is too young.

Under the leadership of Cornelius Fudge, the Ministry of Magic is waging a smear campaign against Harry and Dumbledore, claiming they are lying about the return of Voldemort. Harry faces legal charges for the Patronus Charm he performed, but is exonerated and returns to Hogwarts. Dolores Umbridge, a senior Ministry employee, is the new Defence Against the Dark Arts professor. She implements a textbook-only curriculum and forbids the students from practising defensive spells. Harry, Ron, and Hermione form a secret student group called Dumbledore's Army, which meets in the Room of Requirement to practice defensive magic under Harry's instruction.

One night, Harry dreams that Arthur Weasley is attacked by Voldemort's snake, Nagini. The attack actually occurred, and Dumbledore realises that Harry's mind is connected to Voldemort. He orders Professor Snape to teach Harry Occlumency to keep Voldemort out of his mind. When Umbridge discovers Dumbledore's Army, Dumbledore saves Harry from expulsion by claiming he formed the group. Dumbledore then goes into hiding to avoid arrest. Umbridge is appointed headmistress and begins enacting strict rules and regulations.

During exams, Harry has a vision of Voldemort torturing Sirius at the Department of Mysteries. He attempts to contact Sirius at Grimmauld Place, but Umbridge catches and interrogates him, admitting she sent the Dementors. Hermione intervenes and convinces Umbridge to go with her and Harry into the Forbidden Forest. When Umbridge provokes the centaurs who live there, they take her captive. Harry and his friends fly to the Ministry to rescue Sirius, but he is not there. Instead, they find shelves containing glass spheres, one of which bears Harry's name. Harry picks it up and is immediately surrounded by Death Eaters. Lucius Malfoy reveals that Harry was lured to the Ministry by a false vision from Voldemort, who wishes to hear the prophecy contained in the sphere. He asks Harry for the sphere, but Harry refuses to give it to him.

The students fight the Death Eaters with help from several Order of the Phoenix members. Neville accidentally knocks the sphere down some steps, destroying it. Bellatrix Lestrange attacks Sirius, and he disappears through a mysterious stone archway to his death. Voldemort appears and tries to kill Harry, but Dumbledore arrives and thwarts him. Fudge and other Ministry of Magic employees arrive on the scene and witness Voldemort just before he flees. Back at Hogwarts, Dumbledore tells Harry the prophecy was made by Professor Trelawney, who predicted the birth of a child with the power to vanquish Voldemort. This prophecy caused Voldemort to murder Harry's parents, and it is why he wishes to kill Harry as well. Harry feels overwhelmed by the prophecy and the loss of his godfather, but the wizarding community now believes him and respects him. Motivated by his friends, Harry returns to the Dursleys for the summer.

== Publication and release ==
Harry Potter fans waited three years between the releases of Harry Potter and the Goblet of Fire and Harry Potter and the Order of the Phoenix. Before the release of the fifth book, 200 million copies of the first four books had already been sold and translated into 55 languages in 200 countries. As the series was already a global phenomenon, the book forged new pre-order records, with thousands of people queuing outside book stores on 20 June 2003 to secure copies at midnight. Despite the security, thousands of copies were stolen from an Earlestown, Merseyside warehouse on 15 June 2003.

=== Critical response ===
In 2004, the book was cited as an American Library Association Best Book for Young Adults and as an American Library Association Notable Book. It also received the Oppenheim Toy Portfolio 2004 Gold Medal, along with several other awards. Rowling was praised for her imagination by USA Today writer Deirdre Donahue. The New York Times writer John Leonard praised the novel, saying "The Order of the Phoenix starts slow, gathers speed and then skateboards, with somersaults, to its furious conclusion....As Harry gets older, Rowling gets better." However, he also criticised "the one-note Draco Malfoy" and the predictable Lord Voldemort. The book was a nominee and finalist for the 2004 Prometheus Award.

=== Predecessors and sequels ===
Harry Potter and the Order of the Phoenix is the fifth book in the Harry Potter series. The first book in the series, Harry Potter and the Philosopher's Stone, was first published by Bloomsbury in 1997 with an initial print-run of 500 copies in hardback, 300 of which were distributed to libraries. By the end of 1997, the UK edition won a National Book Award and a gold medal in the 9-to-11-year-olds category of the Nestlé Smarties Book Prize. The second novel, Harry Potter and the Chamber of Secrets, was published in the UK on 2 July 1998. The third novel, Harry Potter and the Prisoner of Azkaban, was published a year later in the UK on 8 July 1999 and in the US on 8 September 1999. The fourth novel, Harry Potter and the Goblet of Fire, was published 8 July 2000, simultaneously by Bloomsbury and Scholastic. The fifth novel, Harry Potter and the Order of the Phoenix, is the longest book in the series, yet it is the second-shortest film at 2 hours 18 minutes.

After the publishing of Order of the Phoenix, the sixth book of the series, Harry Potter and the Half-Blood Prince, was published on 2 April 2005 and sold 9 million copies in the first 24 hours of its worldwide release. The seventh and final novel, Harry Potter and the Deathly Hallows, was published 21 July 2007. The book sold 11 million copies within 24 hours of its release: 2.7 million copies in the UK and 8.3 million in the US.

== Adaptations ==
=== Film ===
In 2007, Harry Potter and the Order of the Phoenix was released in a film version directed by David Yates and written by Michael Goldenberg. The film was produced by David Heyman's company, Heyday Films, alongside David Barron. The budget was reportedly between £75 and 100 million (US$150–200 million), and it became the unadjusted eleventh-highest-grossing film of all time and a critical and commercial success. The film opened to a worldwide 5-day opening of $333 million, the third best of all time, and grossed $940 million total, second to Pirates of the Caribbean: At World's End for the greatest total of 2007.

=== Video games ===
A video game adaptation of the book and film versions of Harry Potter and the Order of the Phoenix was made for Windows, PS2, PS3, Xbox 360, PSP, Nintendo DS, Wii, Game Boy Advance, and Mac OS X. It was released on 25 June 2007 in the U.S., 28 June 2007 in Australia, and 29 June 2007 in the UK and Europe for PlayStation 3, PSP, PlayStation 2, Windows, and 3 July 2007 for most other platforms. The games were published by Electronic Arts.

The book is also depicted in the 2011 video game Lego Harry Potter: Years 5–7.

== See also ==
- Religious debates over the Harry Potter series
