= Muggle =

People without magical abilities in the Harry Potter universe

In J. K. Rowling's Harry Potter series, a Muggle (/ˈmʌɡəl/) is a person who lacks any sort of magical ability and has no magical blood, not having been born into a magical family. It differs from the term Squib, which refers to a person with one or more magical parents yet without any magical power or ability, and from the term Muggle-born (or the derogatory and offensive term mudblood, which is used to imply the supposed impurity of Muggle blood), which refers to a person with magical abilities but with non-magical parents. Equivalent terms used by the in-universe magic community of the United States include No-Maj and No-Majs (short for "no magic"); French equivalents are Non-Magiques and No-Majes. Other terms are Can't-Spells and Non-Wizards.

== Usage in Harry Potter ==
The term Muggle is sometimes used in a pejorative manner in the novels. Since Muggle refers to a person who is not a member of the magical community, Muggles are simply ordinary human beings without any magical abilities and almost always with no awareness of the existence of magic. Witches and wizards with non-magical parents are called Muggle-borns. There have also been some children known to have been born to one magical and one non-magical parent. People of this mixed parentage are called half-bloods; magical people with any Muggle ancestry on the one side or the other are half-bloods as well. The most prominent half-blood in the Harry Potter series is Harry Potter, born to Lily and James Potter, Lily Potter (nee Evans) being the Muggle-born. The most prominent Muggle-born in the Harry Potter series is Hermione Granger, who was born to Muggles of undisclosed names. Witches and wizards with all-magical heritage are called pure bloods.

In the Harry Potter novels, Muggles are often portrayed as foolish, sometimes befuddled characters, who are completely oblivious to the wizarding world that exists in their midst. If, by unfortunate means, Muggles do happen to observe the working of magic, the Ministry of Magic sends Obliviators to cast Memory Charms upon them, causing them to forget the event.

Some Muggles are aware of the wizarding world. These include Muggle parents of magical children, such as Hermione Granger's parents, the Muggle Prime Minister (and predecessors), the Dursley family (Harry Potter's unsupportive non-magical and only living relatives), and the non-magical spouses of some witches and wizards.

Rowling created the word "Muggle" from "mug", an English term for someone who is easily fooled.

=== Notable Muggles ===
- The Dursleys, Harry's maternal relatives with whom he lives for sixteen years
- The Muggle Prime Minister
- Frank Bryce, the Riddle family gardener
- Jacob Kowalski, Newt Scamander's No-Maj friend
- Mary Lou Barebone, leader of the New Salem Philanthropic Society (or the "Second Salemers")

== Other usages ==
The word muggle, or muggles, is now used in various contexts in which its meaning is similar to the sense in which it appears in the Harry Potter book series. Generally speaking, it is used by members of a group to describe those outside the group, comparable to civilian as used by military personnel. Whereas in the books muggle is consistently capitalized, in other uses it is often predominantly lowercase.

- According to the BBC quiz show QI, in the episode "Hocus Pocus", muggle was a 1930s jazz slang word for someone who uses cannabis. "Muggles" is the title of a 1928 recording by Louis Armstrong and His Orchestra.
- A muggle is, according to Abbott Walter Bower, the author of the Scotichronicon, "an Englishman's tail". In Alistair Moffat's book A History of the Borders from Early Times, it is stated that there was a widely held 13th-century belief amongst Scots that Englishmen had tails.
- Ernest Bramah referred to "the artful Muggles" in a detective story published decades before the Potter books ("The Ghost at Massingham Mansions", in The Eyes of Max Carrados, Doran, New York, 1924).
- Muggles is the name of a female character in the children's book The Gammage Cup by Carol Kendall published in 1959 by Harcourt, Brace & World.
- Published in 1982, Roald Dahl's character the Big Friendly Giant uses the word "Muggled" while describing a good dream to the other main character, Sophie - “And the whole school is then cheering like mad and shouting bravo well done, and, for ever after that, even when you is getting your sums all gungswizzled and muggled up, Mr. Figgins is always giving you ten out of ten and writing Good Work Sophie in your exercise book.” – The BFG. Roald Dahl also names a family of monkeys "The Muggle-Wumps" in The Twits and other works.
- Muggle was added to the Oxford English Dictionary in 2003, where it is said to refer to a person who is lacking a skill.
- Muggle is used in informal English by members of small, specialised groups, usually those that consider their activities to either be analogous to or directly involve magic (such as within hacker culture; and pagans, magicians, Neopagans and Wiccans) to refer to those outside the group.
- Muggle (or geomuggle) is used by geocachers to refer to those not involved in or aware of the sport of geocaching. A cache that has been tampered with by non-participants is said to be plundered or muggled.

=== Trademark lawsuit ===
Nancy Stouffer, author of The Legend of Rah and the Muggles (1984) accused Rowling of a trademark violation for the use of the term "muggles", as well as copyright violations for some similarities to her book. Rowling and Scholastic, her publisher, sued for declaratory judgment and won on a summary judgment motion, based on a lack of likelihood of confusion.

== See also ==
- Blood purity in Harry Potter
