= Ministry of Magic =

Fictional governmental organisation from Harry Potter

- Harry Potter organization
- Ministry of Magic logo
- Founded: 1707
- Location: Ministry of Magic Headquarters; Whitehall, London
- Leader: Minister for Magic
- Key people: Cornelius Fudge; Rufus Scrimgeour; Pius Thicknesse; Kingsley Shacklebolt; Bartemius Crouch; Amelia Bones; Ludo Bagman; Corban Yaxley; Dolores Umbridge; Arthur Weasley; Hermione Granger; Harry Potter; Percy Weasley; Dementors; Rita Skeeter
- Purpose: Preservation of magical law; Find the Death Eaters; Silence Harry about Voldemort's return; Capture Barty Crouch Jr; Control the law system and Hogwarts classes; Defeat Voldemort; Imprison Delphini Riddle
- Powers: Government of UK's Magical Community
- Affiliations: International Confederation of Wizards
- Enemies: Lord Voldemort; Bellatrix Lestrange; Lucius Malfoy; Barty Crouch Jr; Peter Pettigrew; Igor Karkaroff; Sirius Black; Rubeus Hagrid; Dudley Dursley; Death Eaters

The Ministry of Magic is a secret government of the British and Irish wizard community in the fictional universe of Harry Potter. It is led by the Minister for Magic, and is first mentioned in Harry Potter and the Philosopher's Stone. Throughout the novels, it is regularly depicted as corrupt, elitist and completely incompetent, with its high-ranking officials blind to ominous events and unwilling to take action against threats to wizard society. It is shown to be a totalitarian wizard ethnostate that controls the rights of wizards, muggles, house elves, and all other sentient creatures with only the humans with magical abilities being able to decide the rights of all. In Order of the Phoenix, Dolores Umbridge was placed at Hogwarts to observe the happenings within the school (acting as a ministry plant), and prevent the spread of news concerning the return of Lord Voldemort. It reaches a zenith of corruption, before being effectively taken over by Lord Voldemort. At the end of the final book, following Lord Voldemort's death, Kingsley Shacklebolt is revealed to have become the Minister of Magic.

== Composition and status ==
=== Connection to Muggle world ===
Each new Muggle Prime Minister receives a visit from the Minister for Magic, who informs them of the existence of the wizarding world. The Minister explains that they will contact the Prime Minister only in circumstances in which the events of the wizarding world may affect Muggles. For example, the Minister has to inform the Prime Minister if dangerous magical artifacts or animals are to be brought into the UK.

=== Government structure ===
The post of Minister for Magic is stated to be an elected position, but who has the power to elect or dismiss ministers is never explained. In the books, employment with the Ministry can be obtained right after completion of a wizarding education, though different offices require different levels of education and sometimes specific exam results with some extra training required within the department itself.

=== Judicial system and corruption ===
In the books and films, the wizarding courts have displayed at times, a marked lack of interest in evidence for or against a suspect. All of the accused are given trials, as in the case of Buckbeak. In Order of the Phoenix, the Ministry is shown to be quite prepared to decree and enforce draconian laws without notice. At times, the Ministry can also seem uninterested in solving serious problems, choosing instead, to ignore or cover up bad news. In Harry Potter and the Chamber of Secrets, Fudge takes a long time to respond to the attacks on Hogwarts; and even then is sure that Rubeus Hagrid is causing the trouble rather than someone else. In the fourth and fifth installments, Fudge refuses to believe that Lord Voldemort has returned, despite mounting evidence. The Ministry even mounts a campaign to damage Harry Potter's credibility, an effort fueled in part by Fudge's fear that Albus Dumbledore wants to forcibly remove him from his position. Eventually, the Ministry is forced to acknowledge the emergency and act on it. Fudge is subsequently removed from office for incompetence and replaced by Rufus Scrimgeour.

== Departments ==
=== Department of Magical Law Enforcement ===
The Department of Magical Law Enforcement is a combination of police and justice facilities. It is located on the second level of the Ministry of Magic. Bartemius Crouch once headed the department, prior to the first book. At the beginning of the series, it is headed by Amelia Bones, who is replaced by Pius Thicknesse after Voldemort murders her. Thicknesse is replaced by Corban Yaxley after Voldemort has Thicknesse appointed the puppet Minister for his regime. By the events of Harry Potter and the Cursed Child, Harry Potter has become its head.

According to Rowling, this is the department that Hermione joins, after the events of the seventh book, transferring from the Department for the Regulation and Control of Magical Creatures, where she began her post-Hogwarts career, later to become Minister for Magic.

==== Auror Office ====
The Ministry employs Aurors to pursue and apprehend Dark wizards. Aurors in the Harry Potter series include Alastor Moody, Nymphadora Tonks, Kingsley Shacklebolt, John Dawlish, Frank and Alice Longbottom, Rufus Scrimgeour. Harry himself later joins the department, and, according to a Rowling 2007 interview, is eventually promoted to department head.

During the First War against Voldemort, Aurors had authorization to use the Unforgivable Curses on suspected Death Eaters: that is, they received license to kill, coerce, and torture them. Aurors also operate to protect high-profile targets such as Harry, Hogwarts, and the Muggle prime minister – in Harry Potter and the Order of the Phoenix auror Kingsley Shacklebolt worked secretly in the Muggle Prime Minister's security detail.

==== Improper Use of Magic Office ====
The Improper Use of Magic Office is responsible for investigating offences under the Decree for the Reasonable Restriction of Underage Sorcery and the International Confederation of Wizards' Statute of Secrecy. They regulate an underage wizard's or witch's use of magic and prohibit wizards and witches from performing magic in the presence of Muggles or in a Muggle-inhabited area in the Harry Potter universe. An enchantment called "the Trace" is placed upon children and helps the department detect offences; it ends when they reach the age of 17. However, Dumbledore explains to Harry that the Ministry cannot tell who exactly uses magic in a given area, only that it has been used. This can be seen as unfair to young witches and wizards who grew up in the Muggle world (such as Muggle-born wizards, or those with one magical and one Muggle parent) as they are more likely to be caught using magic than those who grow up in the wizarding world. Those living in the Muggle world generally have no contact with other witches or wizards away from school, and the Ministry simply presumes that any magic performed where they are is an act of underage wizardry, while at the same time presuming that any magic performed in a wizard home that has minors present was performed by those aged 17 and over. This means that minors living in the wizard world have a much greater chance of escaping punishment for the use of underage magic. The Ministry has to rely on wizard and witch parents to enforce the ban on under-age magic within their homes.

It is not known how or when the Trace is placed upon a child, though it may be assumed that it begins either when the child begins to show magical talent or when they first go through the barrier to Platform 9¾. A number of witches and wizards, including Harry Potter, Hermione Granger, Lily Evans, and Severus Snape all known to have performed some underage magic while growing up in the Muggle world that went unpunished.

After Harry's first minor violation – a Hover charm that was actually performed by Dobby the House-elf – he is merely warned. His second violation, inflating Aunt Marge, is forgiven by Fudge because the Minister fears that Sirius Black is after Harry, and feels that his safety after running away from the Dursleys takes precedence. After his third offence (creating a Patronus to protect himself and Dudley from two Dementors), the letter sent to him states that he is expelled from school; that representatives will arrive at his home to destroy his wand; and that he is required to appear at a disciplinary hearing given that the offence occurred after he had already received one warning. Dumbledore reminds Fudge that the Ministry doesn't have the power to expel students from Hogwarts, or to confiscate wands without benefit of a hearing.

During Harry's hearing in Order of the Phoenix, he is tried by the entire Wizengamot court and cleared of all charges thanks to Dumbledore's intervention. The Wizengamot serves as the wizard high court of law, from the words "wizard" and "Witenagemot", which was a council of powerful people summoned to advise and appoint kings in Anglo-Saxon England. That word derives from the Old English for "meeting of wise men" (witan – wise man or counsellor / gemot – assembly).

==== Other offices ====
Other offices include the Magical Law Enforcement Squad, which pursues day-to-day law offences; the Misuse of Muggle Artefacts Office, headed by Perkins, and the job in which the reader first sees Arthur Weasley; and the Detection and Confiscation of Counterfeit Defensive Spells and Protective Objects Office, created by Rufus Scrimgeour in Harry Potter and the Half-Blood Prince, into which Mr Weasley is promoted, to be its head.

=== Department of Magical Accidents and Catastrophes ===
The Department of Magical Accidents and Catastrophes is responsible for repairing accidental magical damage in the world of Harry Potter. It is located on the third level of the Ministry of Magic and houses the following offices:

- The Accidental Magic Reversal Squad is a squad of wizards whose job it is to reverse "accidental magic." These accidents are normally caused by young witches and wizards who have not learned to control their magic. They may also be caused by older wizards out of control, or severe, unintentional effects of charms or spells, such as splinching (in Apparition when a wizard or witch is split with one part remaining at the point of origin, and the rest of the wizard at the destination). For instance, two members of the Accidental Magic Reversal Squad were sent out in the Harry Potter and the Prisoner of Azkaban book and movie when Harry Potter inflated Aunt Marge; they "deflated" her and erased her memory of the inflation (the memory modification done by Obliviators).
- The Obliviator Headquarters. "Obliviator" is the designation for a Ministry of Magic employee who has the task of modifying the memory of a Muggle who witnesses incidents belonging to the Wizarding world. They are first called so in the sixth volume, although the practice is mentioned in the previous novels: any wizard can modify memories in the Harry Potter books by using the spell "Obliviate". They were sent out in the third book when after they deflated Aunt Marge, they erased her memory of the incident.
- The Muggle-Worthy Excuse Committee explains any major magical accidents to the Muggles by creating a non-magical reason for the accident. For example, Peter Pettigrew killed twelve Muggle bystanders and tore apart the street (so as to reach the sewer pipe and escape) by means of an immense explosion curse during his altercation with Sirius Black. The massive and obvious damage and mortality was explained by the committee as due to a tragic accidental explosion of the gas main.

=== Department for the Regulation and Control of Magical Creatures ===
As noted in Fantastic Beasts and Where to Find Them, the Department for the Regulation and Control of Magical Creatures is divided into three divisions: the Beast Division, the Being Division, and the Spirit Division. It is also noted that Hermione began her post-Hogwarts career here before transferring to the Department of Magical Law Enforcement in this office. It is located on the fourth level of the Ministry of Magic.

=== Department of International Magical Cooperation ===
The Department of International Magical Cooperation is an agency that attempts to get wizards from different countries to co-operate in wizarding actions both political and public. This department on the fifth level of the Ministry of Magic includes the headquarters of the International Magical Trading Standards Body, the International Magical Office of Law, and the British seats of the International Confederation of Wizards. The former head was Bartemius Crouch Sr, until his death. This is also where Percy Weasley began his Ministry career. This department is similar in function to the real-life Foreign and Commonwealth Office of the United Kingdom, and various organs of the United Nations.

=== Department of Magical Transportation ===
The Department of Magical Transportation is responsible for various aspects of magical transport. It is located on the sixth level of the Ministry of Magic and includes the following offices: the Floo Network Authority, responsible for setting up and maintaining the network, and distributing the greenish floo powder; the Broom Regulatory Control, that controls the traffic of broom travel; the Portkey Office, the regulation of Portkeys; and the Apparition Test Centre, that grants licences to witches and wizards so that they can apparate.

=== Department of Magical Games and Sports ===
The Department of Magical Games and Sports organises events like the Quidditch World Cup and the Triwizard Tournament. Ludo Bagman used to be the Head of Department here, but his gambling problem forced him to flee from Goblin creditors. The department is located on the seventh level of the Ministry of Magic, and includes the British and Irish Quidditch League Headquarters, Official Gobstones Club, and the Ludicrous Patents Office – other sports and games-related aspects of the Harry Potter world.

=== Department of Mysteries ===
The Department of Mysteries is a department which studies particular enigmas (death, time, space, thought, and love) and stores copies of prophecies made in the Harry Potter universe. During Voldemort's discriminatory regime, he forces the department to lie and claim that Muggle-borns actually steal magic from Pure-bloods, which makes them "illegal magicals" and allows their arrest.

==== Unspeakables ====
The Unspeakables are the group of wizards who work in the Department of Mysteries (their identities classified for security reasons). Known Unspeakables include Broderick Bode, Croaker, and Augustus Rookwood who is a Death Eater.

== Theme park adaptation ==
Universal Epic Universe at Universal Orlando Resort opened in 2025 and introduced a new themed land titled The Wizarding World of Harry Potter – Ministry of Magic. While much of the land evokes a 1920s wizarding Paris inspired by the Fantastic Beasts: The Crimes of Grindelwald film, the centerpiece of the area is a time-traveling transition via the “Métro-Floo” that transports guests to a recreation of the Ministry of Magic.

The flagship ride, Harry Potter and the Battle at the Ministry, brings riders to the British Ministry of Magic by Métro-Floo, where they become involved in the trial of Dolores Umbridge. Through the Métro-Floo, guests are taken from 1920s Paris to the 1990s British Ministry of Magic. Riders emerge in the Ministry’s grand atrium, complete with the “Fountain of Magical Brethren” depicting a witch, a centaur, a goblin and a house-elf, and floor-to-ceiling Ministry offices. While in the queue, riders pass through a number of Ministry departments—including the Department of Magical Creatures, the Magical Archives, and the Time Room in the Department of Mysteries—before boarding the ride vehicle, an omnidirectional lift.

== Reception ==
Jennifer Barnett of People's Weekly World stated that the reader is drawn "into the politics of the wizarding world—the 'Educational Decrees' from the toad-like Ministry of Magic representative, the high-level connections of 'war criminals' from the last rise of Voldemort, the prejudice against 'mudbloods' and 'half-breeds,'" and suggested connections "to the world we live in, to the similarities and differences between the Fudge administration and the Bush administration." Julia Turner of Slate Magazine also interpreted Rowling's depiction of the ministration as criticism of the Bush and Blair administrations, suggesting the Ministry's security pamphlet recalls the Operation TIPS (Terrorism Information and Prevention System). University of Tennessee law professor Benjamin Barton notes what he considers to be libertarian aspects of Harry Potter in his paper "Harry Potter and the Half-Crazed Bureaucracy", published in the Michigan Law Review, stating that "Rowling's scathing portrait of government is surprisingly strident and effective. This is partly because her critique works on so many levels: the functions of government, the structure of government, and the bureaucrats who run the show. All three elements work together to depict a Ministry of Magic run by self-interested bureaucrats bent on increasing and protecting their power, often to the detriment of the public at large. In other words, Rowling creates a public-interest scholar's dream—or nightmare—government."
