= List of Fantastic Beasts characters =

This is a list of characters from the Fantastic Beasts films.

== Introduced in Fantastic Beasts and Where to Find Them ==
=== Newt Scamander ===
Newt Scamander is an introverted British wizard and magizoologist, as well as a member of Hogwarts' Hufflepuff House. In Fantastic Beasts and Where To Find Them, Newt arrives in New York, where he encounters Muggle Jacob Kowalski, demoted auror Porpentina "Tina" Goldstein and Tina's Legilimens sister Queenie Goldstein. Newt works together with the trio and rounds up escaped magical beasts. After an obscurial attack, Newt prevents the exposure of the wizarding world to American Muggle (known as No-maj) community through an obliviating potion, dispersed by his thunderbird Frank.

In Fantastic Beasts: The Crimes of Grindelwald, Newt illegally reaches Paris with Jacob in order to track and save Credence Barebone, the obscurial responsible for the New York attack. He faces another challenge as Tina, whom he has begun to love, shuns him upon thinking that he is engaged. Nonetheless, Newt clears the misunderstanding and reconciles with Tina. After a destructive rally of Grindelwald's followers during which Credence and Queenie join dark wizard Gellert Grindelwald, Newt chooses to join the fight against Grindelwald.

Newt reappears in Fantastic Beasts: The Secrets of Dumbledore. Along with his former professor Albus Dumbledore, Newt and his team thwart Grindelwald's plans for world domination and stop him from becoming the minister for magic. When Queenie realises her mistake and returns to the good side, she and Jacob marry. Newt attends the wedding as Jacob's best man, while Tina attends as well, as her sister's maid of honour.

At some point after the end of the global wizarding war, Newt and Tina marry and have a grandson named Rolf who marries Luna Lovegood. Newt is the author of the book Fantastic Beasts and Where to Find Them, which is used as a textbook by Harry Potter and his classmates.

Throughout the film series, Newt Scamander is portrayed by Eddie Redmayne. In Crimes of Grindelwald, a young Newt Scamander is portrayed by Joshua Shea.

=== Tina Goldstein ===
Porpentina Esther "Tina" Goldstein (played by Katherine Waterston) is a grounded, down-to-earth witch and demoted auror employed by MACUSA. Unlike her sister, Tina has no special powers beyond being a competent witch. But she is never afraid to assert herself when she believes she is right, a trait which gets her in trouble with MACUSA. Tina played an instrumental role in the New York incident, helping Newt secure the creatures that escaped from his magical suitcase. She helps Newt to clear their names after they are framed by Percival Graves - Head of the American auror office in order to keep his motives and actions secret. Tina was the only person besides Newt to show compassion to Credence both before and after his magical powers were revealed. At the end of Fantastic Beasts, she and Newt have a tender parting before he returns to Europe. Tina was later promoted back to her position of Auror.

In Crimes of Grindelwald, Tina attempts to find and help Credence along with Newt and fights against Grindelwald's forces in the Paris incident. She is cold toward Newt throughout most of this adventure, until she discovers that it is not Newt but his brother who is engaged to Leta Lestrange, as had been mistakenly been reported.

In Secrets of Dumbledore, it is revealed Tina is now head of the American Auror office in New York, so she has no part in the events of this film. Tina briefly reunites with Newt at Queenie and Jacob's wedding. The warmth of this reunion hints at the eventual romantic relationship between the two.

=== Jacob Kowalski ===
Jacob Kowalski (played by Dan Fogler) is a brave First World War veteran, a genial No-Maj and a talented and creative aspiring baker. His birthday is on January 15th (national bagel day) according to a headcannon on Mugglecast. Hoping to get out of his dead-end factory job, he accidentally takes Newt Scamander's magical suitcase menagerie when he goes to apply for a bank loan to open a bakery. He meets Newt, Tina, and Queenie in Fantastic Beasts and Where to Find Them and is quickly smitten with Queenie. At the end of the film, Jacob has been given the money by Newt to open his bakery, but his memory of their magical adventures are erased.

In The Crimes of Grindelwald, it is revealed that he regained his memories of Queenie and the others. Since marriage is forbidden by MACUSA between magical and non-magical people in America, Jacob refuses to marry Queenie, whom he wishes to protect from the wrath of the magical community. Queenie, wounded by his refusal, leaves him to join Grindelwald, who promises her the hope of marrying Jacob.

In Secrets of Dumbledore, Lally Hicks recruits Jacob to join the cause against Grindelwald and presents him with a wand. He assists Newt, Lally, Theseus, Yusuf Kama, and Dumbledore in preventing Grindelwald from stealing the election of Supreme Mugwump. At the end of the film, Queenie returns to his side and they get married in his New York City bakery.

=== Queenie Goldstein ===
Queenie Goldstein (played by Alison Sudol) is Tina's younger sister and roommate and a skilled Legilimens. She meets Jacob Kowalski in New York City during the events of Fantastic Beasts and Where to Find Them. Sharing a love of cooking, they fall deeply in love, but MACUSA bans marriage between wizards and No-Majs. Wounded by Jacob's refusal to marry her (even though he feels it is to protect her), Queenie joins Grindelwald in The Crimes of Grindelwald, as he promises her a new world order. In Secrets of Dumbledore, Queenie becomes increasingly disillusioned with Grindelwald, ultimately renouncing him. She later marries Jacob in the latter's New York City bakery.

=== Mary Lou Barebone ===
Mary Lou Barebone (played by Samantha Morton) is a fanatical No-Maj campaigner against wizardry and the abusive adoptive mother of Credence, Chastity, and Modesty. She is unaware that she has adopted a magical child and was killed by it.

=== Credence Barebone ===
Credence Barebone (played by Ezra Miller) is a secret obscurus wizard and Mary Lou Barebone's troubled adopted son. Unaware of his origins or that he has magical powers, Credence harbours enormous rage, which turns into a dangerous Obscurus, having been tormented for years by his abusive adoptive mother. He meets Newt Scamander and Tina Goldstein in New York. Percival Graves is initially mistaken in thinking that the Obscurus inhabits his adoptive sister Modesty, when in reality it was Credence who kills Senator Henry Shaw Jr and his own adoptive mother, before being neutralized by MACUSA aurors.

In The Crimes of Grindelwald, Credence travels to Paris, searching for his true identity. Newt Scamander is tasked by Albus Dumbledore to find him and protect him from Grindelwald, who wishes to use Credence in his quest for power. The young man initially believes himself to be a son of the Lestrange family, but Leta dismisses this possibility. At Nurmengard Castle, Grindelwald tells Credence that his real name is Aurelius Dumbledore and that his brother (Albus Dumbledore) would seek to destroy him.

In The Secrets of Dumbledore, in 1932, five years after the events of the last movie, Credence is sent by Grindelwald to China to capture a baby qilin. He reports it in person to his new master. Later, Credence has a conversation with Queenie Goldstein; she tells him that Grindelwald regularly asks her to spy on the young man and report his thoughts to him, but she reveals to Credence that she doesn't tell everything. After that, Credence looks in a mirror and sees an inscription: "Forgive me", which he immediately erases. It is understood that Credence, from Nurmengard, communicates with someone by magic messages written on mirrors. Credence feels that he has been rejected by the Dumbledores and Grindelwald stirs up his feeling of abandonment, convinced that Credence's pain is his strength. Later, Albus Dumbledore briefly spots one of Credence's messages on a bar mirror, addressed to his brother Aberforth. In the streets of Berlin, Albus comes to meet the young man and, anticipating the confrontation, takes care beforehand to tip them into a mirror dimension in order to protect the Muggles present around them. Credence claims to be his brother and that his name is Aurelius. He engages a fight but is weakened due to his obscurus. Albus sees Credence's phoenix, and confirms that the young man is indeed a Dumbledore. He is touched by his suffering and his loneliness and manages to convince him that Grindelwald has fueled his hatred, and that the Dumbledore family, who were unaware of the truth until now, have never rejected him. After that, Credence returns to Nurmengard. In the basements of the castle, Credence sees Grindelwald, his master, reanimate the previously killed qilin, and is violently reprimanded for neglecting the qilin's twin, whom Grindelwald has just seen in the reflection of the resurrection pool. One evening, Credence sends a new message to Aberforth, wishing to "come home". The same night, Albus has a discussion with his brother about Credence. It is revealed that the young man is actually Albus's nephew, and Aberforth's son. After that, Credence goes to Bhutan to attend the next confederation election. Grindelwald manipulates the election by having the reanimated qilin bow to him. However, with the help of Newt Scamander, Bunty and the twin qilin, Credence exposes Grindelwald's lies. Gellert tries to kill Credence by using the Killing Curse, but the young man is protected by the Dumbledore brothers. Credence finally meets his father and returns home to Hogsmeade with his phoenix.

=== Modesty Barebone ===
Modesty Barebone (played by Faith Wood-Blagrove) is a haunted young girl who is the youngest of Mary Lou's adopted children.

=== Seraphina Picquery ===
Seraphina Picquery (played by Carmen Ejogo) is the president of MACUSA.

=== Henry Shaw Snr ===
Henry Shaw Snr (played by Jon Voight) is a newspaper owner and the father of U.S. senator Henry Jnr and Langdon Shaw.

=== Langdon Shaw ===
Langdon Shaw (played by Ronan Raftery) is the younger of Henry Shaw Snr's sons, who begins to believe in magic.

=== Henry Shaw Jnr ===
Henry Shaw Jnr (played by Josh Cowdery) is the elder of Henry Shaw Snr's sons and also his father's favourite one. He is a successful politician and is killed by Credence Barebone's Obscurus during a speech at a fundraising dinner.

=== Abernathy ===
Abernathy (played by Kevin Guthrie) is Tina and Queenie's MACUSA supervisor and later an acolyte of Grindelwald

=== Chastity Barebone ===
Chastity Barebone (played by Jenn Murray) is the middle of Mary Lou's adopted children

=== Gellert Grindelwald ===
Gellert Grindelwald is an infamous, powerful dark wizard who caused mass violence, terror, and chaos around the globe, seeking to lead a new Wizarding World Order based on his strong belief in wizarding superiority. He was in a relationship with Dumbledore when the two were teenagers.

Grindelwald is portrayed by Colin Farrell disguised as Percival Graves in Fantastic Beasts and Where to Find Them and Johnny Depp both in Fantastic Beasts And Where To Find Them and Crimes of Grindelwald, by Mads Mikkelsen in The Secrets of Dumbledore, by Jamie Campbell Bower as young Grindelwald, and by Michael Byrne as old Grindelwald

=== Leta Lestrange ===
Leta Lestrange (played by Zoë Kravitz, by Thea Lamb as a teenager and by Tuby Wooldenfen as a child) is an emotionally damaged and confused young woman who still exerts some control over Newt, who was once, and possibly still is, in love with her. She appears in the first film in just an animated photograph. She is also the fiancé to Theseus Scamander.

== Introduced in Fantastic Beasts: The Crimes of Grindelwald ==
=== Theseus Scamander ===
Theseus Scamander (played by Callum Turner) is Newt Scamander's older brother who works in the Auror Office of the Department of Magical Law Enforcement. He is also the fiancé to Leta Lestrange.

=== Nagini ===
Nagini (played by Claudia Kim) is the main attraction of a wizarding circus and freak show called Circus Arcanus and a Maledictus, who carries a blood curse that will eventually transform her into a snake permanently.

=== Yusuf Kama ===
Yusuf Kama (played by William Nadylam and by Isaac Domingos as a child) is a French-Senegalese wizard.

=== Nicholas Flamel ===
Nicholas Flamel (played by Brontis Jodorowsky) is a French wizard and alchemist who created the Philosopher's stone.

=== Albus Dumbledore ===
Albus Dumbledore (played by Jude Law and by Toby Regbo as a teenager) is an extremely influential and powerful wizard in the British Wizarding Community, known in the British Ministry of Magic and throughout the wider wizarding world for his academic brilliance.

=== Bunty Broadacre ===
Bunty Broadacre (played by Victoria Yeates) is Newt Scamander's "indispenable" assistant. She has an unrequited love with an oblivious Newt.

=== Vinda Rosier ===
Vinda Rosier (played by Poppy Corby-Tuech) is Grindelwald's loyal right-hand follower and an Occlumens.

=== Minerva McGonagall ===
Minerva McGonagall (played by Fiona Glascott) is a teacher at Hogwarts and Albus Dumbledore's colleague.

=== Carrow ===
Carrow (played by Maja Bloom) is a follower of Grindelwald

=== Mustafa Kama ===
Mustafa Kama (played by Hugh Quarshie) is the husband of Laurena Kama and the father of Yusuf Kama

=== Torquill Travers ===
Torquill Travers (played by Derek Riddell) is the head of the Department Magical Law Enforcement.

=== Lally Hicks ===
Eulalie "Lally" Hicks (played by Jessica Williams) is a respected teacher at Ilvermorny School of Witchcraft and Wizardry.

== Introduced in Fantastic Beasts: The Secrets of Dumbledore ==
=== Aberforth Dumbledore ===
Aberforth Dumbledore (played by Richard Coyle) is Albus Dumbledore's younger brother and owner of the Hog's Head inn.

=== Anton Vogel ===
Anton Vogel (played by Oliver Masucci) is the current Supreme Head of the International Confederation of Wizards (ICW) and Minister of Magic for Germany. In Secrets of Dumbledore, Vogel actively makes political attempts to assist Grindelwald in his electoral efforts.

=== Vicência Santos ===
Vicência Santos (played by Maria Fernanda Cândido) is a candidate for the post of Supreme Head of the ICW and Minister of Magic for Brazil

=== Liu Tao ===
Liu Tao (played by Dave Wong) is a candidate for the post of Supreme Head of the ICW and Minister of Magic for China.

=== Henrietta Fischer ===
Henrietta Fischer (played by Valerie Pachner) is a witch who works for the German Ministry of Magic.

=== Zabini ===
Zabini (played by Paul Low-Hang) is an acolyte of Grindelwald

=== Helmut ===
Helmut (played by Aleksandr Kuznetsov) is a corrupted auror of the German Ministry and a follower of Grindelwald.

=== Frank Doyle ===
Frank Doyle (played by Wilf Scolding) is an American wizard and colleague of Lally Hicks.

== See also ==
- List of Harry Potter characters
