= High Inquisitor =

High Inquisitor may refer to:

- Grand Inquisitor, the lead official of the Inquisition
- Hogwarts High Inquisitor, fictional character in J. K. Rowling's Harry Potter series
- Imperial High Inquisitor, fictional character in the Star Wars franchise
