= David Kenny =

David Kenny may refer to:

- David Kenny (footballer, born 1891) (1891–1978), Scottish footballer (Grimsby Town)
- David Kenny (footballer, born 1962), Scottish footballer (Partick Thistle)
- David Kenny (journalist), Irish journalist, author and broadcaster
- David Kenny (hurler) (born 1987), Irish hurler
- David Kenny (executive), American CEO of the Weather Channel
- David A. Kenny (born 1946), American psychologist
- David Kenny (athlete) (born 1999), Irish racewalker
