= David Kenny (journalist) =

David Kenny is a journalist, broadcaster, best-selling author, screenwriter and songwriter living in Dublin, Ireland.

In October 2016, Kenny was shortlisted for a Bord Gais Energy Irish Book Award (popular non-fiction) for Mr Pussy: Before I Forget To Remember, co-written with legendary drag queen, Alan Amsby. The book charts Amsby's life in Ireland from 1969 to the present and has a foreword by drag artist and gay rights campaigner, Panti Bliss. Amsby is best remembered for his innovative drag shows and stewardship of Mr Pussy's Café De Luxe, which he ran with Bono, Jim Sheridan and Gavin Friday in the mid-1990s.

Kenny is the grandnephew and literary executor of Abbey Theatre founder actress and 1916 rebel, Maire Nic Shiubhlaigh. In March 2016, Kenny edited and published her expanded memoirs, The Splendid Years. The book was written by his father, Ted Kenny, in 1955 but was taken out of print by the author after disagreements with the publishers.

His other books include: The Little Buke of Dublin: Or, How to Be a Real Dub, Erindipity The Irish Miscellany, and Erindipity Rides Again. The latter two are books that feature humorous essays about little-known Irish historical facts.

Kenny is the editor and originator of The Press Gang, Tales from the Glory Days of Irish Newspapers (New Island Books). Press Gang features, for the first time, fifty-five former Irish Press writers and editors celebrating the paper's glory days, from the 1950s to its closure in May 1995.

He was originator and compiler of the 'Trib' which was launched in mid-July 2011. The Trib: Highlights from the Sunday Tribune, Vol I is a collection of articles chosen by the newspaper's writers.

He was also author and co-originator of the Inish Turk Beg Brilliant Irish Series which was released globally in January 2011 by Warner Music. The Brilliant Irish Series is a book and CD set charting the history of Ireland's traditional instruments. The first instalment, The Brilliant Irish Flute, features The Lord of the Rings soloist, Alan Doherty and is produced by composer and former Kíla member, Lance Hogan. It also contains written contributions from Jim Kerr, Matt Molloy, Barry Devlin, Moya Brennan and Kevin Godley.In 2014, he co-wrote "Anni's Lullaby", the theme song of Italian-Irish thriller film House of Shadows with Hogan.

In June 2026, Kenny released his first solo single, Light of Day https://open.spotify.com/album/7z9XK4ntN8iNtJg8Mh6k50. Self-produced and mastered, it features Kenny on vocals, playing all the instruments. It drew praise from Oasis' Bonehead among others.

Kenny was the host of around-Ireland travel series, Kenny Wild, on Irish TV (Sky 191). The show featured Kenny travelling the Wild Atlantic Way, meeting unusual people and taking part in various challenges outside of his comfort zone (coasteering, dancing in a Riverdance-style show, and playing Gaelic football).

In 2011, Kenny hosted UNESCO City of Literature's inaugural Great Writing, Great Places event in the Deanery of St Patrick's Cathedral, Dublin, with author Brian Keenan and the former governor of Mountjoy Jail, John Lonergan. He has hosted Dublin City's Libraries Readers Day since 2011 and is a regular interviewer/MC at Waterford, Dublin, Mountains to the Sea, and Dalkey Book Festivals.

He was a weekly columnist on RTÉ's The Daily Show and TV3's Morning Show with Sybil and Martin for several seasons (both now finished airing) and is a regular contributor to documentaries and discussions on Irish television and radio.

Kenny has worked in various writing and senior editorial roles for The Irish Press, The XPress, Evening Press, Evening News, RTÉ television news and Independent Newspapers. He was Acting Deputy Editor of the Evening Herald from 2005 to 2007, before joining the Sunday Tribune as associate editor and news opinion columnist. He has written news, lifestyle and opinion-based features for a wide variety of newspapers, including the Irish Times, the Sunday Times, the Irish Examiner and the Sunday Independent newspapers. He has worked on the Irish Daily Mail since August 2017.
