= Christian Manz =

British visual effects artist

- Occupation: Visual effects artist

Christian Manz is a British visual effects artist. He was nominated for an Academy Award in the category Best Visual Effects for the film Harry Potter and the Deathly Hallows – Part 1. He has also been nominated for three British Academy Film Awards. He is represented by the visual effects studio, Framestore, where he also serves as a creative director in the film division.

== Selected filmography ==
- How to Train Your Dragon, production VFX Supervisor
- Fantastic Beasts: The Secrets of Dumbledore, production VFX Supervisor
- Fantastic Beasts: The Crimes of Grindelwald, production VFX Supervisor
- Fantastic Beasts and Where to Find Them, production VFX Supervisor
- Dracula Untold, production VFX Supervisor
- 47 Ronin, production VFX Supervisor
- Harry Potter and the Deathly Hallows – Part 1 (2010; co-nominated with Tim Burke, John Richardson and Nicolas Aithadi)

== Awards and recognition ==
- 2023 VES Award Nominee, Outstanding Visual Effects in a Photoreal Feature for Fantastic Beasts: The Secrets of Dumbledore
- 2019 BAFTA Nominee, Best Achievement in Special Visual Effects for Fantastic Beasts: The Crimes of Grindelwald
- 2017 BAFTA Nominee, Best Special Visual Effects for Fantastic Beasts and Where to Find Them
- 2017 VES Award Nominee, Outstanding Visual Effects in a Photoreal Feature for Fantastic Beasts and Where to Find Them
- 2011 Academy Award Nominated, Best Visual Effects for Harry Potter and the Deathly Hallows: Part 1
- 2011 BAFTA Nominee, Best Special Visual Effects for Harry Potter and the Deathly Hallows: Part 1
- 2011 Critics Choice Award Nominee, Best Visual Effects for Harry Potter and the Deathly Hallows: Part 1
- 2009 BAFTA TV Award Nominee, Best Visual Effects for Primeval
- 2005 VES Award Winner, Outstanding Compositing in a Broadcast Program for Space Odyssey: Voyage to the Planets
- 2003 VES Award Winner, Best Compositing in a Televised Program, Music Video or Commercial for Dinotopia
