= Fantastic Beasts: The Crimes of Grindelwald =

2018 film by David Yates

- Theatrical release poster
- Directed by: David Yates
- Written by: J. K. Rowling
- Based on: Characters by J. K. Rowling
- Produced by: David Heyman; J. K. Rowling; Steve Kloves; Lionel Wigram
- Starring: Eddie Redmayne; Katherine Waterston; Dan Fogler; Alison Sudol; Ezra Miller; Zoë Kravitz; Callum Turner; Claudia Kim; William Nadylam; Kevin Guthrie; Jude Law; Johnny Depp
- Cinematography: Philippe Rousselot
- Edited by: Mark Day
- Music by: James Newton Howard
- Production companies: Warner Bros. Pictures; Heyday Films
- Distributed by: Warner Bros. Pictures
- Release dates: 8 November 2018 (Paris); 16 November 2018 (United States and United Kingdom)
- Running time: 134 minutes
- Countries: United Kingdom; United States
- Language: English
- Budget: $200 million
- Box office: $654.9 million

Fantastic Beasts: The Crimes of Grindelwald is a 2018 fantasy film directed by David Yates and written by J. K. Rowling. The sequel to Fantastic Beasts and Where to Find Them (2016), it is the second instalment in the Fantastic Beasts film series and the tenth overall in the Wizarding World franchise. It features an ensemble cast including Eddie Redmayne, Katherine Waterston, Dan Fogler, Alison Sudol, Ezra Miller, Zoë Kravitz, Callum Turner, Claudia Kim, William Nadylam, Kevin Guthrie, Jude Law, and Johnny Depp. Set in 1927, it follows Newt Scamander and Albus Dumbledore as they attempt to take down the dark wizard Gellert Grindelwald while facing new threats in a more divided wizarding world.

A second Fantastic Beasts film was announced in October 2014, and Rowling confirmed in July 2016 that she had completed the script. Depp was cast in November 2016, causing some controversy due to domestic violence allegations made against him. Law signed on in April 2017. Principal photography began in July 2017 at Warner Bros. Studios, Leavesden, in England. Filming also took place in London, Switzerland, and Paris, and wrapped in December 2017.

Fantastic Beasts: The Crimes of Grindelwald premiered in Paris on 8 November 2018, and was released theatrically in the United Kingdom and United States on 16 November 2018, by Warner Bros. Pictures. It grossed $654.9 million worldwide, making it the tenth highest-grossing film of 2018. It became the lowest-grossing instalment of the Wizarding World franchise upon release, which it remained until the release of its sequel, Fantastic Beasts: The Secrets of Dumbledore, in 2022. It received generally mixed reviews from critics, as it was viewed to have been filled with too many characters and "overburdened" with sequel-dependent details. At the 72nd British Academy Film Awards, the film was nominated for Best Production Design and Best Special Visual Effects. The sequel, Fantastic Beasts: The Secrets of Dumbledore, was released in April 2022.

== Plot ==
In 1927, as the Magical Congress of the United States of America (MACUSA) is transferring the dark wizard Gellert Grindelwald to Europe to stand trial, Grindelwald escapes. Three months later in London, Newt Scamander requests the Ministry of Magic lift his international travel ban. While there, he runs into former Hogwarts classmate Leta Lestrange, the fiancée of his brother, Theseus. The Ministry will grant Newt's request if he agrees to help Theseus locate Credence Barebone, who is in Paris. Newt declines after learning he must work with ruthless bounty hunter Gunnar Grimmson. Albus Dumbledore (revealed to have indirectly but intentionally sent Newt to New York) also asks Newt to find Credence, believing Credence is Leta's long-lost half-brother, Corvus Lestrange V.

Newt is visited by his American friends Queenie Goldstein and Jacob Kowalski, a non-magical person. Jacob has regained his memories that were erased the previous year. Newt learns that Queenie's sister Tina Goldstein mistakenly believed Newt and Leta were engaged and began seeing someone else. Newt realizes that Queenie enchanted Jacob and came to London to circumvent the marriage ban between wizards and non-magical people. After Newt lifts the enchantment, Jacob refuses to marry Queenie, fearing the consequences she would face. Upset, Queenie leaves to find Tina, who is searching for Credence in Paris. Newt and Jacob follow soon after, using a Portkey, a magical transport method, to get around Newt's ban on international travel.

In Paris, Credence escapes the Circus Arcanus with captive performer Nagini, a woman cursed to transform into a snake permanently. Searching for Credence's birth mother, they locate half-elf servant Irma Dugard, who brought him to America for adoption. Grimmson, secretly a Grindelwald follower, kills Irma before she reveals who sent her. Tina meets Yusuf Kama, who is also hunting Credence. Newt and Jacob trail Yusuf to Tina, finding her being held hostage. Yusuf also imprisons them, explaining he made an Unbreakable Vow to kill Corvus Lestrange V, who he believes is Credence. Meanwhile, a distraught Queenie is brought to Grindelwald; knowing Queenie's abilities, he allows her to leave while manipulating her into joining him through her desire to marry Jacob.

Newt and Tina escape from Yusuf and infiltrate the French Ministry of Magic to search for documents confirming Credence's identity, but Leta and Theseus discover them. Newt and Tina reunite after Newt explains he was never engaged to Leta. They go to the Lestrange family tomb and find Yusuf confronting Credence and Nagini. Yusuf reveals that he is carrying out his father, Mustafa's, request to avenge his mother, Laurena: she was kidnapped by Corvus Lestrange IV using the Imperius Curse, and died giving birth to Leta, Yusuf's half-sister. Corvus IV remarried and had Corvus V. He sent Corvus V to America for adoption to keep him safe after discovering Yusuf's revenge plot. Leta reveals that she unintentionally caused Corvus V's death: sailing to America, Leta, unable to stand her baby brother's constant crying, switched her baby brother with another infant, Credence; the ship eventually sank, and Corvus drowned.

The group enters a rally of Grindelwald's followers. Jacob is searching for Queenie, who is among the attendees. Grindelwald displays a vision of a future global war, and rails against laws prohibiting wizards from preventing such a tragedy. As Theseus and the Aurors surround the rally, Grindelwald prompts his followers to spread his message across Europe. He conjures a ring of blue fire that kills the retreating Aurors and that only his most loyal followers can safely cross. Queenie and Credence cross the fire despite Jacob's and Nagini's protests, while Leta sacrifices herself to allow others to escape. As Grindelwald and his followers depart, the remaining wizards and the immortal alchemist Nicolas Flamel extinguish the fire. Newt joins the fight against Grindelwald.

At Hogwarts, Newt presents Dumbledore with a vial that Newt's Niffler stole from Grindelwald. It contains a blood pact that Grindelwald and Dumbledore made in their youth that prevents them from dueling each other; Dumbledore believes it can be destroyed. At Nurmengard Castle, Grindelwald presents Credence with a wand along with his phoenix, and reveals Credence's possible identity: Aurelius Dumbledore.

== Cast ==
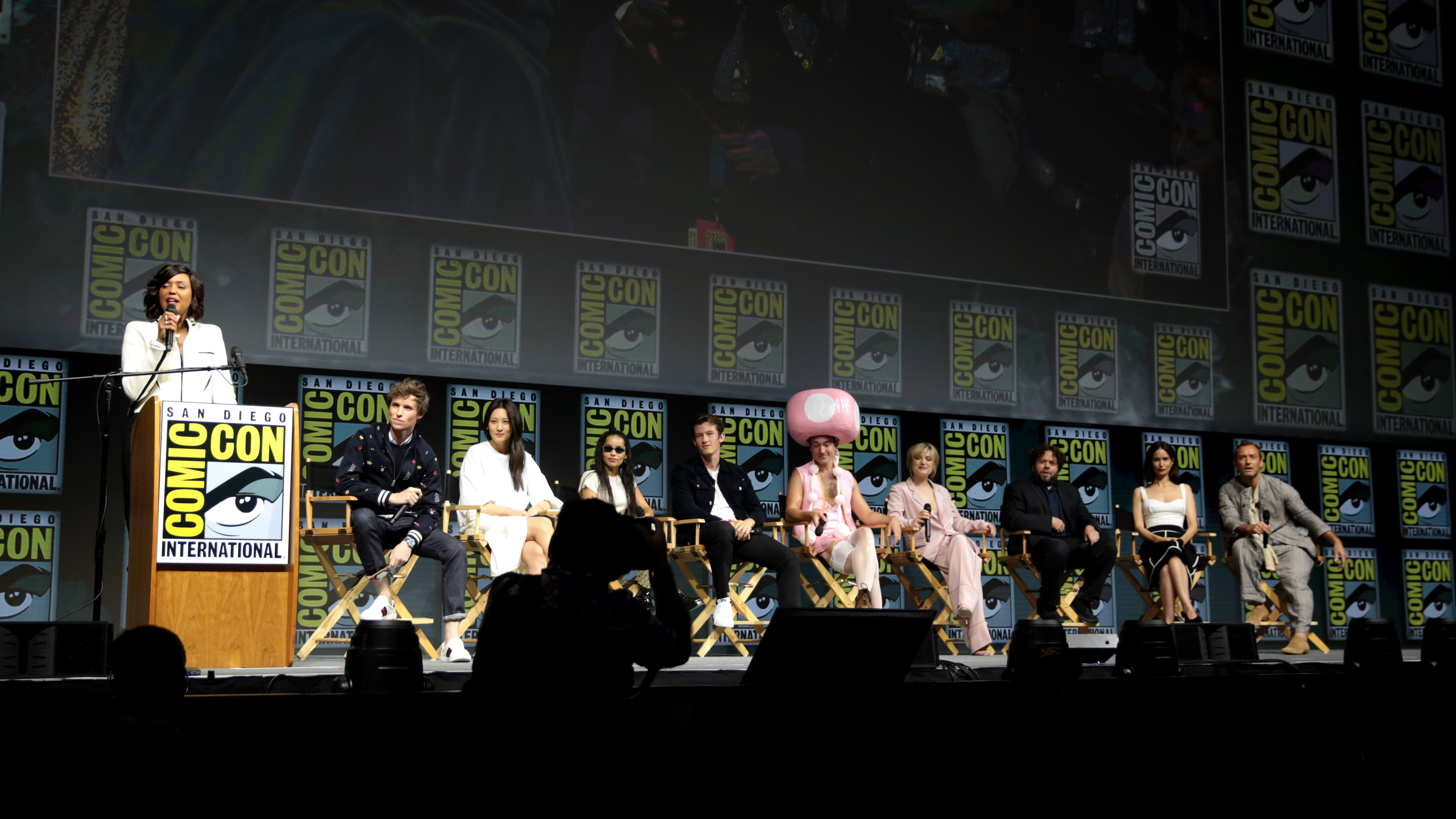
Cast of Fantastic Beasts: The Crimes of Grindelwald at the 2018 San Diego Comic-Con. Seated, from left to right: Eddie Redmayne, Claudia Kim, Zoë Kravitz, Callum Turner, Ezra Miller, Alison Sudol, Dan Fogler, Katherine Waterston and Jude Law

- Eddie Redmayne as Newt Scamander:
  A British Ministry of Magic employee in the Beasts Division of the Department for the Regulation and Control of Magical Creatures, as well as a self-proclaimed magizoologist. He played a part in remedying the events of a violent attack on the City of New York in December 1926 involving Dark wizard Gellert Grindelwald. He is a confidant of Albus Dumbledore, despite being an outcast from certain circles of British Wizarding society due to his checkered past.
  - Joshua Shea portrays a young Newt.
- Katherine Waterston as Tina Goldstein:
  A promoted MACUSA (Magical Congress of the United States of America) Auror. She played a role in thwarting Gellert Grindelwald during the Obscurus incident of 1926, for which she and Newt were initially blamed.
- Dan Fogler as Jacob Kowalski:
  A No-Maj veteran of World War I, owner of a bakery, a friend of Newt's, and the primary love interest to Queenie. It is revealed in the film that Swooping Evil venom (used to obliviate New York City in the previous film) only erases "bad memories", and meeting Newt, Queenie, and Tina and learning of the wonders of magic is not a bad memory for Jacob—as such, he is able to continue engaging with the wizarding world.
- Alison Sudol as Queenie Goldstein:
  The beautiful and vivacious younger sister of Tina, who worked alongside her in the Federal Wand Permit Bureau after Tina was demoted. She is a powerful natural Legilimens and can read minds. She has fallen in love with Jacob Kowalski, despite American wizarding law forbidding relationships with No-Majs.
- Ezra Miller as Credence Barebone:
  The disturbed adopted child of Mary-Lou Barebone, severely abused and downtrodden. Enraged by people's treatment of him, during the incident of 1926 he set his Obscurus parasite loose on the City of New York, causing widespread destruction. He survived in a tiny Obscurus fragment and is now sought by several different groups.
- Zoë Kravitz as Leta Lestrange:
  An emotionally damaged and confused young woman who still exerts some control over Newt, who was once, and possibly still is, in love with her. Ostracized by her fellow Hogwarts students, she was befriended by a young Newt. She is descended from a historically wealthy pure-blooded family infamous for embracing the Dark Arts. She is currently engaged to Theseus Scamander, Newt's brother, and works at the British Ministry of Magic as assistant to Torquil Travers, the Head of Magical Law Enforcement.
  - Thea Lamb and Ruby Woolfenden portray younger versions of Leta.
- Callum Turner as Theseus Scamander:
  Newt Scamander's older brother who works in the Auror Office of the Department of Magical Law Enforcement, fought in World War I, and is described as a "war hero". The two brothers share a tentatively warm relationship, slightly marred by their disparate personalities and beliefs. He spent the previous year hunting Grindelwald with a team of British Aurors. Theseus is currently engaged to Leta Lestrange.
- Claudia Kim as Nagini:
  The main attraction of a wizarding circus and freak show called Circus Arcanus and a Maledictus, who carries a blood curse that will eventually transform her into a snake permanently. For as long as she can remember, Skender has exploited her transformative powers. Nagini befriends Credence Barebone when he works as a menial worker at the circus. Nagini will eventually become the infamous companion of Lord Voldemort.
- William Nadylam as Yusuf Kama:
  A French-Senegalese wizard who has spent many years obsessively searching for Credence and has finally tracked him down in Paris at Circus Arcanus.
  - Isaac Domingos portrays a young Yusuf.
- Kevin Guthrie as Abernathy:
  Tina and Queenie's previous MACUSA supervisor, now a loyal follower of Grindelwald.
- Jude Law as Albus Dumbledore:
  An extremely influential and powerful wizard in the British wizarding community, known in the British Ministry of Magic and throughout the wider wizarding world for his academic brilliance. Currently a professor of Defence Against the Dark Arts at Hogwarts School of Witchcraft and Wizardry. As a teenager, he and Grindelwald had become "closer than brothers". A strong ally of Newt Scamander's, he is called upon to help resist Grindelwald's reign of terror.
  - Toby Regbo reprises his role from Harry Potter and the Deathly Hallows – Part 1 as a young Dumbledore.
- Johnny Depp as Gellert Grindelwald:
  An infamous, powerful dark wizard who caused mass violence, terror, and chaos around the globe, seeking to lead a new Wizarding World Order based on his strong belief in wizarding superiority. As teenagers, he and Dumbledore had become lovers. In the film, he escapes from MACUSA in New York and renews his efforts for pure-blood world domination. It was Depp's idea for the character to have heterochromia, as he said he saw Grindelwald as "more than one [...] almost as though he was two people."
  - Jamie Campbell Bower reprises his role from Harry Potter and the Deathly Hallows – Part 1 as a young Grindelwald.

Carmen Ejogo briefly reprises her role as Seraphina Picquery, the President of MACUSA, from the first film. Brontis Jodorowsky portrays Nicolas Flamel, a 14th-century, 600-year-old Parisian scribe and alchemist believed to have discovered the Philosopher's Stone, who is a friend and colleague of Dumbledore. The character was mentioned previously in Harry Potter and the Philosopher's Stone. Fiona Glascott portrays a young Minerva McGonagall. Poppy Corby-Tuech portrays Vinda Rosier, Grindelwald's loyal right-hand woman. Ingvar Eggert Sigurðsson portrays Grimmson, a powerful bounty hunter. Ólafur Darri Ólafsson portrays Skender, the cruel head and ringmaster of Circus Arcanus. Late French actress Danielle Hugues portrays Irma Dugard, Corvus' half-elf nanny. David Sakurai appears as Krall, Grindelwald's ambitious and sulky henchman. Victoria Yeates portrays Bunty, Newt Scamander's assistant. Maja Bloom portrays Carrow, a Grindelwald follower, Jessica Williams portrays Lally Hicks, a teacher of Ilvermorny School of Witchcraft and Wizardry who contacts Flamel. Isaura Barbé-Brown portrays Laurena Kama, who is Yusuf Kama and Leta Lestrange's mother. Derek Riddell, Wolf Roth and Cornell John portray Torquil Travers, Spielman and Arnold Guzman, respectively. Keith Chanter plays Corvus Lestrange IV, Corvus V's father.

== Production ==
=== Development ===
In October 2014, Warner Bros. Pictures announced that Fantastic Beasts would be "at least" a trilogy, with the first instalment set to be released on 18 November 2016, the second on 16 November 2018, and the third on 20 November 2020. David Yates was confirmed to direct at least the first instalment of the series.

In July 2016, Yates confirmed that J. K. Rowling had written the screenplay for the second film and had ideas for the third. Yates talked to Entertainment Weekly about the second film, saying: "we've seen the script for Part 2, for the second movie, which takes the story in a whole new direction – as you should, you don't want to repeat yourself. The second movie introduces new characters as she builds this part of the Harry Potter universe further. It's a very interesting development from where we start out. The work is pouring out of her."

In October 2016, it was reported that the Fantastic Beasts film series would comprise five films, with Eddie Redmayne returning to play the lead role of Newt Scamander in each film. It was announced that Yates would be returning to direct the sequel for producers Rowling, David Heyman, Steve Kloves, and Lionel Wigram, and he said the second film would be set in a different global capital city than the first.

=== Pre-production ===
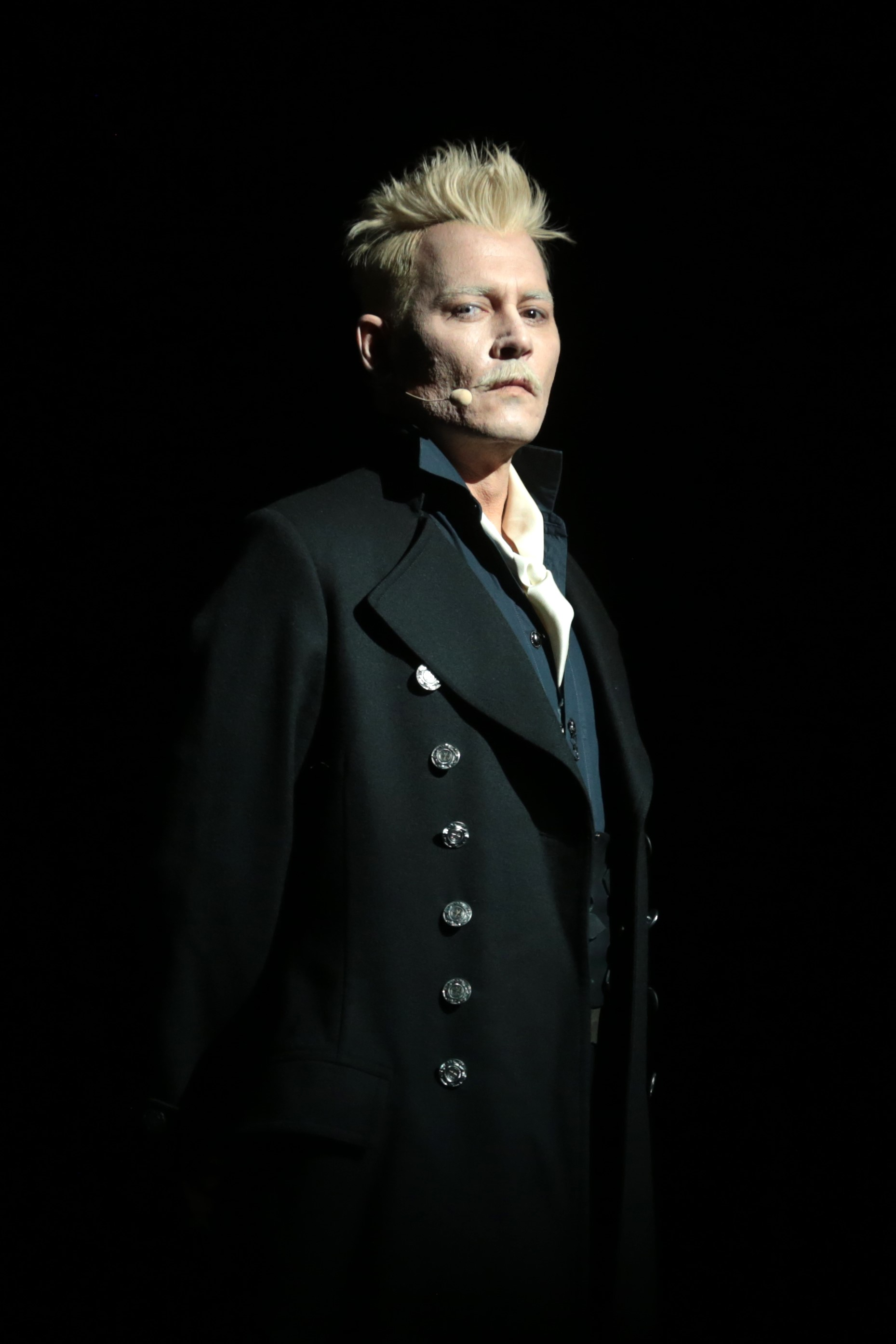
The casting of Johnny Depp (pictured in character as Gellert Grindelwald) received criticism from some fans.

On 1 November 2016, Deadline Hollywood reported that Johnny Depp had been cast in the film. Depp's casting received criticism from some fans, due to domestic violence allegations against him. In December 2017, J. K. Rowling posted on her website that she would not recast the role because Depp and his ex-wife, actress Amber Heard, had previously expressed hope that the mutual agreement they reached would enable both to move on from the controversy and "the filmmakers and I are not only comfortable sticking with our original casting, but genuinely happy to have Johnny playing a major character in the movies." About Rowling's response, Depp said in October 2018, "I'll be honest with you, I felt bad for J. K. having to field all these various feelings from people out there. I felt bad that she had to take that."

Jude Law was cast as Albus Dumbledore after director David Yates decided that the character should be played by a younger actor, not Michael Gambon (who played the role in six of the Harry Potter films). Many other actors were considered for the role, including Christian Bale, Benedict Cumberbatch, Mark Strong, and Jared Harris (son of Richard Harris, who played Dumbledore in the first two Harry Potter films).

=== Filming ===
The film is set in the UK and Paris. Principal photography began on 3 July 2017 at Warner Bros. Studios, Leavesden, in Hertfordshire, England, where a part of Paris was built for the purpose including streets, alleys, and a square. The New York set from the first film had been built in exactly the same spot. On 22 September 2017, David Sakurai was cast to play Krall, one of the ambitious and sulky henchman of Grindelwald. Law reportedly finished filming his scenes as Dumbledore in September 2017. On 5 October 2017, several other castings were announced, including Brontis Jodorowsky as Nicolas Flamel and Jessica Williams joining in an undisclosed role. Principal photography wrapped on 20 December 2017.

=== Music ===
James Newton Howard confirmed in November 2016 that he would return to compose the music for the film. The soundtrack was released by WaterTower Music on 9 November 2018.

=== Post-production ===
Christian Manz was the production VFX supervisor working with DNEG (Double Negative), Framestore, Method Studios, Image Engine, Milk VFX, Rodeo FX, Nzivage, Proof, The Third Floor, Inc. and Lola Visual Effects, with Industrial Light & Magic (ILM) doing the concept design and development and The Visual Effects Company doing the motion capture.

== Marketing ==
Exactly one year before the release of the film, on 16 November 2017, the title was revealed to be Fantastic Beasts: The Crimes of Grindelwald, and along with the announcement an ensemble photo depicting the cast of the film was also released. A teaser trailer and teaser poster depicting Newt and Dumbledore were released on 13 March 2018, after an announcement from Warner Bros. Pictures with the #WandsReady hashtag was released the previous day. The first official trailer for the film first premiered on 21 July 2018 during Warner Bros.' Hall H panel at the 2018 International Comic-Con in San Diego. In addition, Johnny Depp made a surprise appearance as Gellert Grindelwald in full costume.

The promotional tour for the film officially started on 24 September 2018, with an appearance by writer J.K. Rowling and several cast members on the Today Show Plaza, as it was announced that another trailer would be released the following day; nine individual character posters featuring Newt, Tina, Jacob, Queenie, Credence, Theseus, Leta, Grindewald and Dumbledore were also released that day. The final trailer for the film was officially released on 25 September 2018, along with a tenth individual poster featuring Nagini. The official poster for the film, along with five posters depicting characters pair-ups and their relationships, were released on 9 October 2018, while a final theatrical poster was unveiled on 2 November 2018.

=== Tie-in literature ===
As with the previous Fantastic Beasts film, the film's script was published in book form on 16 November 2018 as Fantastic Beasts: The Crimes of Grindelwald - The Original Screenplay, written by J. K. Rowling.

== Release ==
=== Theatrical ===
Fantastic Beasts: The Crimes of Grindelwald had its world premiere at the UGC Ciné Cité Bercy in Paris on 8 November 2018. It was released worldwide by Warner Bros. Pictures on 16 November 2018.

=== Home media ===
Fantastic Beasts: The Crimes of Grindelwald was released for digital download on 15 February 2019, and on Ultra HD Blu-ray, 3D Blu-ray, Blu-ray and DVD on 12 March 2019.

== Reception ==
=== Box office ===
Fantastic Beasts: The Crimes of Grindelwald grossed $159.6 million in the United States and Canada, and $495.3 million in other territories, for a total worldwide gross of $654.9 million, against a production budget of $200 million.

In the United States and Canada, the film was released alongside Instant Family and Widows, and was projected to gross $65–75 million from 4,163 theatres in its opening weekend. The film made $25.7 million on its first day, including $9.1 million from Thursday night previews, an improvement over the first film's $8.75 million. It went on to debut to $62.2 million over the weekend, a 16% drop from the first Fantastic Beasts' $74.4 million, and marking the lowest opening for a film in the Wizarding World franchise until the release of Fantastic Beasts: The Secrets of Dumbledore. Deadline Hollywood noted that mixed critical reviews and competition in theaters likely hurt the opening weekend figures. In its second weekend, the film dropped 52% to $29.4 million (including $42.9 million over the five-day Thanksgiving frame), finishing fourth at the box office. In its third weekend, the film made $11.4 million, remaining in fourth place.

Internationally, the film was expected to gross an additional $188–205 million from 79 countries, for a global debut of about $250 million. It made $10.1 million on its first day of release from 10 countries, including $2.6 million in France and $2 million in South Korea. On its second day of release, the film began to play in 45 other countries and made another $18.4 million, for a two-day gross of $31 million. It also made $12.8 million on its first day in China, the best of any Wizarding World film in the country. It went on to have an international debut of $191 million, for a global total of $253.2 million, a 2.7% improvement over the first film's debut. Its largest markets were China ($37.5 million), the UK ($16.3 million, or £12.7 million) and Germany ($12.8 million). In several countries, it had the best-ever opening for a Wizarding World film, including Russia, Indonesia, Argentina, and Brazil.

=== Critical response ===
On review aggregator Rotten Tomatoes, the film has an approval rating of 36% based on 337 reviews, with an average rating of 5.3/10. The website's critical consensus reads: "Fantastic Beasts: The Crimes of Grindelwald has glimmers of the magic familiar to Harry Potter fans, but the story's spell isn't as strong as earlier installments." On Metacritic, the film has a weighted average score of 52 out of 100 based on 48 critics, indicating "mixed or average reviews", making it the lowest-rated Wizarding World film on both websites. Audiences polled by CinemaScore gave the film an average grade of "B+" on an A+ to F scale, the lowest of the franchise, while PostTrak reported filmgoers gave it an 83% positive score and a 69% "definite recommend". Social media monitor RelishMix noted online responses to the film were "mixed".

Sandie Angulo Chen of Common Sense Media gave the film 3 out of 5 stars and wrote: "The production values are amazing in this latest Potterverse adventure, but there are so many convoluted subplots and new characters that some wizarding favorites (creature and human) are underused." and "The movie's visuals are spectacular, and the action is thrilling -- a couple of moments are even a bit jump-worthy -- but this installment lacks some of the charm and discovery of its predecessor." Andrew Barker of Variety called the film a "cluttered expansion of the Harry Potter franchise" and wrote: "The film throws plenty of plot twists, loud noises, and multihued magical nebulae at us, but rarely is there much tension, or sense of adventure, or any real longing, just the feeling of watching one chess piece after another being moved into position." Arjun N. of The Santa Fe New Mexican gave the film 3.5 out of 5 stars, and criticized that "the movie falls flat, resulting in some boring sections of exposition with forced moments of fan service. The movie feels considerably crowded and in need of a more compelling story in some sections." Critic Peter Bradshaw of The Guardian gave the film 3 out of 5 stars, praising the performances of Law and Depp, but criticizing the film's excessive plotting, writing: "This Fantastic Beasts film is as watchable and entertaining as expected [...] but some of the wonder, novelty and sheer narrative rush of the first film has been mislaid in favour of a more diffuse plot focus, spread out among a bigger ensemble cast." Peter Travers of Rolling Stone gave it 3 stars out of 5 and criticized the film for being overlong and exposition heavy, saying it feels "like an overload of homework"; he suggested it was too much for Muggles and best left to fans only. Justin Chang of the Los Angeles Times wrote: "It offers up dazzling feats of sorcery and realms of wonderment [...] and manages to conjure the very opposite of magic." Chang found Newt to be "charmless" and the plot "grindingly complicated", though he welcomed the introduction of Jude Law as Dumbledore.

=== Accolades ===
Award	Date of ceremony	Category	Recipient(s)	Result	Ref.
Oklahoma Film Critics Circle Awards	28 December 2018	Most Disappointing Film	Fantastic Beasts: The Crimes of Grindelwald	Won	
Artios Awards	January 31, 2019	The Zeitgeist Award	Fiona Weir	Nominated	
Art Directors Guild Awards	February 2, 2019	Excellence in Production Design for a Fantasy Film	Stuart Craig	Nominated	
Visual Effects Society Awards	February 5, 2019	Outstanding Effects Simulations in a Photoreal Feature	Dominik Kirouac, Chloe Ostiguy, Christian Gaumond	Nominated	
British Academy Film Awards	February 10, 2019	Best Production Design	Stuart Craig and Anna Pinnock	Nominated	
British Academy Film Awards	February 10, 2019	Best Special Visual Effects	Tim Burke, Andy Kind, Christian Manz, and David Watkins	Nominated	
Satellite Awards	February 22, 2019	Best Costume Design	Colleen Atwood	Nominated	
Satellite Awards	February 22, 2019	Best Art Direction and Production Design	Stuart Craig	Nominated	
Satellite Awards	February 22, 2019	Best Visual Effects	Fantastic Beasts: The Crimes of Grindelwald	Nominated	
Teen Choice Awards	August 11, 2019	Choice Movie – Sci-Fi/Fantasy	Fantastic Beasts: The Crimes of Grindelwald	Nominated	
Teen Choice Awards	August 11, 2019	Choice Sci-Fi/Fantasy Movie Actress	Katherine Waterston	Nominated	
Teen Choice Awards	August 11, 2019	Choice Movie Villain	Johnny Depp	Nominated	
Saturn Awards	September 13, 2019	Best Fantasy Film	Fantastic Beasts: The Crimes of Grindelwald	Nominated	
European Film Awards	December 7. 2019	People's Choice Award	Fantastic Beasts: The Crimes of Grindelwald	Nominated	

== Sequel ==
A sequel, Fantastic Beasts: The Secrets of Dumbledore, was released in the United Kingdom on 8 April 2022 and in the United States on 15 April 2022. The film was previously scheduled for release on 12 November 2021, but it was pushed back to 15 July 2022. In November 2020, Mads Mikkelsen was announced to have been cast as Grindelwald, replacing Depp, who had been asked by Warner Bros. to resign following the verdict of the Depp v News Group Newspapers Ltd court case.

== See also ==
- List of films about witchcraft

== Literature ==
- Rowling, J. K. (2018). Fantastic Beasts: The Crimes of Grindelwald - The Original Screenplay. New York: Arthur A. Levine Books. ISBN 9781338263893.
