= Fantastic Beasts: The Secrets of Dumbledore =

2022 film by David Yates

- Theatrical release poster
- Directed by: David Yates
- Screenplay by: J. K. Rowling; Steve Kloves
- Based on: Characters by J. K. Rowling
- Produced by: David Heyman; J. K. Rowling; Steve Kloves; Lionel Wigram; Tim Lewis
- Starring: Eddie Redmayne; Jude Law; Ezra Miller; Dan Fogler; Alison Sudol; William Nadylam; Callum Turner; Jessica Williams; Victoria Yeates; Poppy Corby-Tuech; Fiona Glascott; Katherine Waterston; Maria Fernanda Cândido; Richard Coyle; Oliver Masucci; Aleksandr Kuznetsov; Mads Mikkelsen
- Cinematography: George Richmond
- Edited by: Mark Day
- Music by: James Newton Howard
- Production companies: Warner Bros. Pictures; Heyday Films
- Distributed by: Warner Bros. Pictures
- Release dates: 29 March 2022 (Royal Festival Hall); 14 April 2022 (Worldwide); 15 April 2022 (United States)
- Running time: 142 minutes
- Countries: United Kingdom; United States
- Language: English
- Budget: $200 million
- Box office: $407.2 million

Fantastic Beasts: The Secrets of Dumbledore is a 2022 fantasy film directed by David Yates from a screenplay by J. K. Rowling and Steve Kloves, based on characters by Rowling. The sequel to Fantastic Beasts: The Crimes of Grindelwald (2018), it is the third and final instalment in the Fantastic Beasts film series and the eleventh overall in the Wizarding World franchise. The film features an ensemble cast that includes Eddie Redmayne, Jude Law, Ezra Miller, Dan Fogler, Alison Sudol, Callum Turner, Jessica Williams, Katherine Waterston, and Mads Mikkelsen. Set five years after the events of The Crimes of Grindelwald, it sees Albus Dumbledore tasking Newt Scamander and his allies with a mission that takes them into the heart of dark wizard Gellert Grindelwald's army.

The film was slated for release in November 2021, before it was pushed back to April 2022 due to the COVID-19 pandemic. Much of the main cast from the first two films confirmed their involvement in March 2020. Principal photography was set to begin in early 2020, but was postponed due to the pandemic, eventually commencing in September 2020. Johnny Depp returned as Grindelwald and filmed one scene for the film, but was asked to step down in November 2020 following the verdict of the Depp v News Group Newspapers Ltd court case; Mads Mikkelsen replaced him later that month. Filming wrapped in February 2021.

Fantastic Beasts: The Secrets of Dumbledore premiered at the Royal Festival Hall in London on March 29, 2022, and was released internationally on April 14 and in the United States on April 15, by Warner Bros. Pictures. It received mixed reviews from critics and grossed over $407 million worldwide, making it the lowest-grossing film of the Wizarding World franchise.

== Plot ==
In a restaurant, Albus Dumbledore confesses to Grindelwald that he supported his plans to destroy the Muggle world because he was in love with him.

In Kweilin, Newt Scamander helps a qilin — a magical creature with psychic abilities — give birth. Not long after, Credence apparates in, killing the mother and kidnapping the newborn. The qilin gave birth to another baby, which Newt rescues before joining Theseus. The brothers meet Albus in Hogsmeade, who reveals he cannot harm Grindelwald or vice versa due to their blood troth.

Grindelwald's acolytes arrive at Nurmengard and give him the newborn qilin. Intending to harness its precognitive abilities, he slits its throat as Queenie surreptitiously observes. Queenie visits Credence, who is struggling with the revelation that he is a Dumbledore. She relays Grindelwald's suggestion that Credence seek out and kill Albus for abandoning him.

Meanwhile, Jacob Kowalski encounters Ilvermorny Charms teacher Lally Hicks. They use a portkey to join Newt, Theseus, and Senegalese-French wizard Yusuf Kama. Newt relays Albus' plan to defeat Grindelwald. He gives a fake wand to Jacob, a red and gold tie to Theseus, and a book to Lally.

In Berlin, Anton Vogel, the outgoing Supreme Head of the International Confederation of Wizards (ICW), acquits Grindelwald of all criminal charges. This allows him to run in the elections for the Head of the ICW in a three-way competition against Vicência Santos and Liu Tao. The Head is traditionally selected by the qilin, which bows to someone pure of heart. Grindelwald overpowers and arrests Theseus. Albus apparates into Berlin and dispatches Newt to the Erkstag, the German prison where Theseus is held.

Credence hunts Albus and battles him in the streets of Berlin, but is quickly disarmed. Albus confirms to Credence that he is a Dumbledore, the son of his brother Aberforth, but assures him that they did not intentionally abandon him. Credence questions his loyalty to Grindelwald.

Jacob threatens Grindelwald with his wand to let Queenie go and is mistaken for an assassin. Lally casts a storm charm as a distraction and is able to activate the book portkey in time for her and Jacob to escape. Grindelwald reanimates the dead qilin and charms it to bow to him to influence the ICW election. He commands Credence to redeem himself by killing the surviving qilin.

Having rescued Theseus, the brothers escape with the red and gold tie, a portkey that transports them to Hogwarts, where they reconvene with Albus, Lally, and Jacob. Each carries an identical suitcase, with only one containing the qilin. They travel via portkey to the ICW vote in Bhutan. On arrival, they are confronted by Grindelwald's followers. Theseus, Lally, and Jacob are surrounded and have their suitcases taken, but when they are opened, they release Quidditch balls, angry books with fangs, and rapidly multiplying pastries.

Jacob convinces Queenie to come back to him from Grindelwald, but they are caught. At the election, the dead qilin that Grindelwald charmed bows to him, and he is elected as the new Head of the ICW, after which he immediately declares war on all Muggles and tortures Jacob with the Cruciatus curse.

Credence arrives and reveals that Grindelwald's qilin is dead. The surviving qilin is produced. It passes Grindelwald and bows to Albus. He thanks the qilin for the honour, but convinces it that there is another equally worthy. The qilin then bows to Santos, who is elected as the legitimate Head of the ICW.

Enraged, Grindelwald tries to kill Credence, who is simultaneously protected by Aberforth and Albus. While defending Credence, Albus and Grindelwald's clashing spells break the blood pact. They cannot bring themselves to attack one another at close range and a cornered Grindelwald disapparates.

Aberforth accepts the dying Credence as his son and takes him home. Back in New York City at Jacob's bakery, Jacob and Queenie have a small wedding ceremony. While preparing his speech, Newt steps outside as Tina arrives, and spots Albus watching from across the street. Dumbledore thanks Newt before disappearing into the night.

== Cast ==
- Eddie Redmayne as Newt Scamander:
  A British Ministry of Magic employee in the Beasts Division of the Department for the Regulation and Control of Magical Creatures, as well as a self-proclaimed magizoologist. He played a part in remedying the events of a violent attack in New York City in December 1926 involving dark wizard Gellert Grindelwald. He is a confidant of Albus Dumbledore, despite being an outcast from certain circles of the British Wizarding Community due to his checkered past.
- Jude Law as Albus Dumbledore:
  An extremely powerful and influential wizard in the British Wizarding Community, known in the British Ministry of Magic and throughout the wider wizarding world for his academic brilliance, and teacher of Defence Against the Dark Arts at Hogwarts School of Witchcraft and Wizardry. He holds a blood pact with Grindelwald, with whom he was in love and had a close relationship with as a young adult, preventing them from duelling each other.
- Ezra Miller as Credence Barebone:
  The disturbed adopted child of Mary-Lou Barebone, who severely abused him and named him "Credence Barebone". Enraged by people's treatment of him, during the incident of 1926 he set his Obscurus parasite loose in New York City, causing widespread destruction. He survived in a tiny Obscurus fragment and was sought out by Grindelwald. He initially believed that he was Corvus Lestrange, Leta Lestrange's deceased half-brother. However, at the end of the second film, Grindelwald claimed that his real name is Aurelius Dumbledore and that his brother, Albus, would seek to kill him. In the third film, he is identified as being Albus's nephew rather than his brother, as he is actually the illegitimate son of Albus's brother Aberforth.
- Dan Fogler as Jacob Kowalski:
  An American No-Maj veteran of the First World War, owner of a bakery, friend of Newt, and lover of Queenie. When she returns, he later marries her and Newt serves as his best man.
- Alison Sudol as Queenie Goldstein:
  The pretty and vivacious renegade younger sister of Tina, who worked alongside her in the Magical Congress of the United States of America (MACUSA). She is a powerful natural Legilimens. After being convinced that Grindelwald will make her dream of marrying Jacob come true, she went rogue and joined his side, eventually abandoning her lover and sister. She later returns to Jacob and they marry at his bakery. Her sister serves as maid of honour.
- William Nadylam as Yusuf Kama:
  A French wizard of Senegalese descent from an old Wizarding family and an ally of Newt, who previously attempted to kill Credence while falsely believing him to be his former stepfather's son, Corvus Lestrange V.
- Callum Turner as Theseus Scamander:
  Newt Scamander's older brother who is a dedicated and loyal Auror, as well as the Head of the Auror Office in the British Ministry of Magic. He is famous for the title "war hero" for his excellent show of bravery and generosity in the First World War. He constantly tries to tame Newt into more elegance so that he is better accepted in society. He lost his fiancée, Leta Lestrange, in September 1927, after she sacrificed herself at Grindelwald's rally in Père Lachaise, Paris to save the Scamander brothers.
- Jessica Williams as Eulalie "Lally" Hicks:
  A respected Charms teacher at America's Ilvermorny School of Witchcraft and Wizardry.
- Victoria Yeates as Bunty:
  Newt Scamander's indispensable Magizoology assistant.
- Fiona Glascott as Minerva McGonagall:
  A teacher at Hogwarts and Albus Dumbledore's colleague.
- Richard Coyle as Aberforth Dumbledore:
  Albus Dumbledore's younger brother, owner of the Hog's Head inn at Hogsmeade, and is the biological father of Credence.
- Oliver Masucci as Anton Vogel:
  The outgoing Supreme Leader of the International Confederation of Wizards (ICW) and Minister of Magic for Germany.
- Poppy Corby-Tuech as Vinda Rosier:
  Grindelwald's loyal right-hand follower.
- Katherine Waterston as Tina Goldstein:
  An American MACUSA Auror and currently Head of the Auror Office in MACUSA. She is Queenie Goldstein's sister and Newt's love interest. She played a role in thwarting Gellert Grindelwald during the Obscurus incident of 1926, for which she and Newt were initially blamed.
- Mads Mikkelsen as Gellert Grindelwald:
  An infamous powerful dark wizard who caused mass violence, terror and chaos around the globe, seeking to lead a new Wizarding World Order based on his strong belief in wizarding superiority. He had a close relationship with Dumbledore as a teenager. Mikkelsen replaces Johnny Depp, who played Grindelwald in the first two films, due to the latter's libel case with News Group Newspapers Ltd. over his alleged domestic abuse of his ex-wife, Amber Heard. The story does not acknowledge or explain the change in Grindelwald's appearance between films, which Mikkelsen described as a "deliberate" choice.

Other cast members include Maria Fernanda Cândido as Vicência Santos and Dave Wong as Liu Tao, both candidates for the post of Supreme Leader of the ICW; Aleksandr Kuznetsov as Helmut, an Auror of the German Ministry of Magic; and Valerie Pachner as Henrietta Fischer, secretary for the German Minister of Magic.

The following cast members appear in minor and one-scene roles: Cara Mahoney as Waitress, a woman who attends Albus in a teashop; Maja Bloom as Carrow, a Grindelwald follower; Wilf Scolding as Frank Doyle / Workman, a relative of Lally; Paul Low-Hang as Zabini, a Grindelwald follower; Peter Simonischek as Warder, a guard of the Erkstag prison; Matthias Brenner as Otto, a leather craftsman; Kazeem Tosin Amore as Workman 2, Noor Dillan-Night as Workman 3, Manuel Klein as Tall Auror, Jan Pohl as Ministry Official, Jacqueline Boatswain as Ida Webb, a British witch and member of the International Confederation of Wizards; Ramona Kunze-Libnow as Edith, a woman who welcomes Lally and Jacob in the Candidates Dinner; David Bertrand as Victor, a wizard who works with Vogel, Stefan Race as Karl, a dark-eyed waiter; Sean Talo as Ministry Wizard, Dónal Finn as Albert, a baker who works with Jacob, Jeremy Azis as German Muggle 24, Jessica Cartledge as "red-headed Ravenclaw", Radha Sthanakiya as "tiny witch 1", Isabelle Coverdale as "tiny witch 2", and Emilia Karlsson as Ministry Guest.

== Production ==
=== Development ===
In October 2014, Warner Bros. Pictures announced the film as "at least" a trilogy with the third instalment to be released on 20 November 2020. In July 2016, director David Yates confirmed that J. K. Rowling had ideas for the third film's screenplay. In October 2016, it was reported that the Fantastic Beasts film series would comprise five films, and Eddie Redmayne would be returning to all films to play the lead role of Newt Scamander, with producers Rowling, David Heyman, Steve Kloves, and Lionel Wigram. In November 2016, Yates revealed that he would be directing all five films, stating "I love making films, and I've got a great team, all of whom are like family."

In October 2018, Johnny Depp hinted that he might return to portray Gellert Grindelwald for the third film, which would start filming in mid-2019.

On 7 February 2019, it was revealed the film would be set in the 1930s, with the story leading up to the Wizarding World's involvement in World War II and exploring the magical communities in Bhutan, Germany and China in addition to previously established locations including the United States and United Kingdom. In November 2019, Warner Bros. put out a press release announcing the film's location of Brazil, a spring 2020 start of production, and that Steve Kloves, who had previously served as screenwriter on the Harry Potter films, had joined the project as co-writer.

=== Casting ===
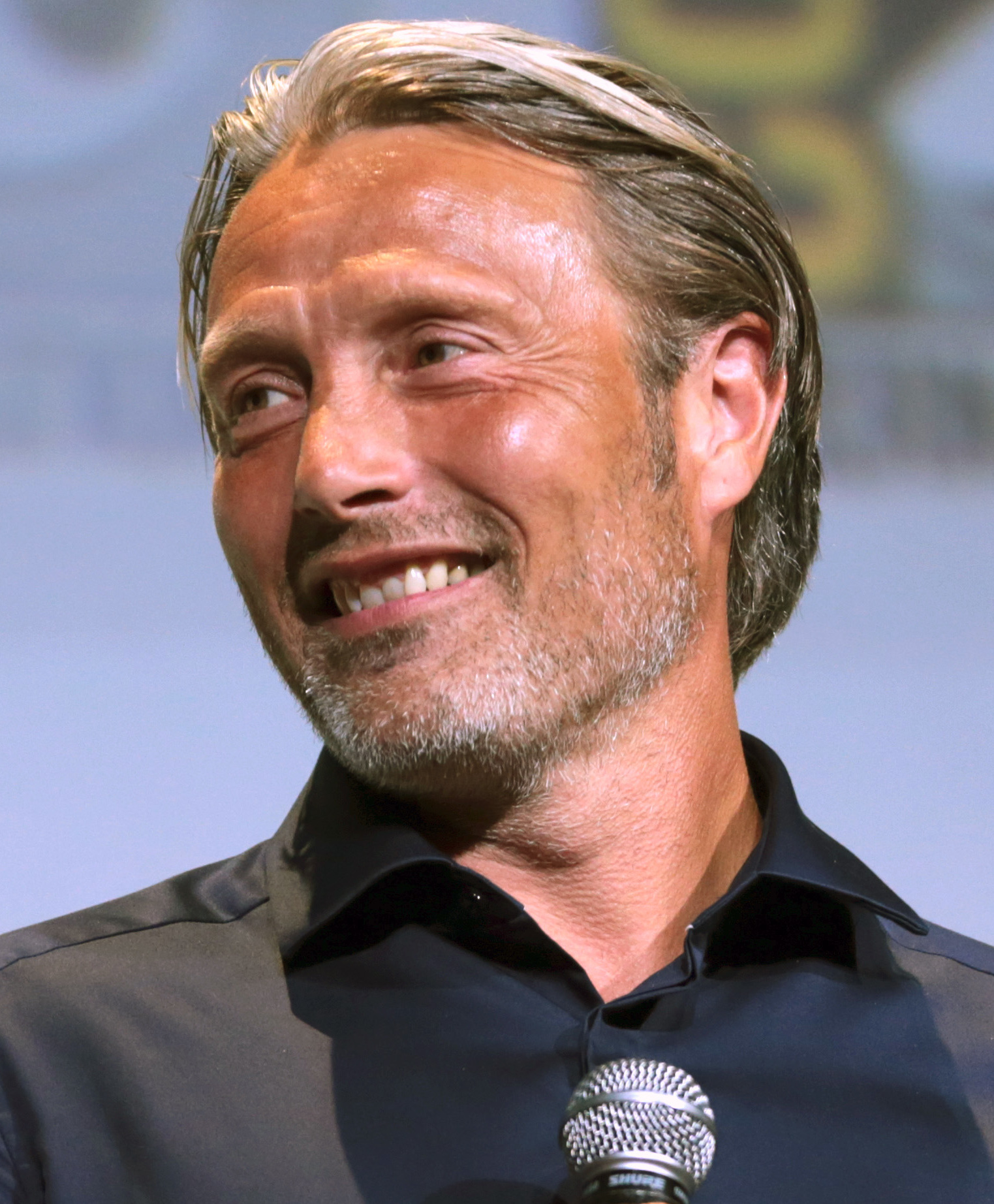
Mads Mikkelsen was cast to replace Johnny Depp as Gellert Grindelwald.

In March 2020, Jude Law, Johnny Depp, Ezra Miller, Alison Sudol, Dan Fogler, Callum Turner, Katherine Waterston, Claudia Kim and Jessica Williams were revealed to be reprising their roles from previous films, alongside Eddie Redmayne. Kevin Guthrie, who played Abernathy in the first two instalments, was set to return but was fired before production began due to his trial and eventual conviction in a sexual assault case. In November 2020, Depp announced he would not reprise his role as Grindelwald after being asked by Warner Bros. to resign due to negative publicity resulting from the libel case Depp v News Group Newspapers Ltd. Depp shot only three scenes in London after production began in September 2020, and his contract stipulated that he be paid regardless of whether the film was completed or not. Depp's salary was reportedly somewhere between $10–16 million. On 25 November, Warner Bros. announced that Mads Mikkelsen would replace Depp in the role of Grindelwald. Mikkelsen opted not to emulate Depp's performance, stating in an interview that it would be "creative suicide", but acknowledged that there still needed to be "some sort of bridge between what came before."

=== Filming ===
Filming officially commenced in London in September, with safety precautions in place to keep the cast and crew safe from COVID-19. On 3 February 2021, filming at Warner Bros. Studios, Leavesden in the UK was halted after a crew member tested positive for COVID-19. Composer James Newton Howard confirmed later that month that production had wrapped filming. Although the film is partially set in Berlin and Bhutan, it was not filmed on location. These areas were reimagined and reconstructed on the vast backlot and sound stages of Warner Bros. Studios, Leavesden, augmented by visual effects, led by production VFX supervisor Christian Manz.

=== Music ===
Composer James Newton Howard returned to compose the film's score after previously scoring Fantastic Beasts and Where to Find Them and Fantastic Beasts: The Crimes of Grindelwald, whilst also incorporating John Williams's themes from the Harry Potter films into the score.

== Marketing ==
The film marketing campaign began in September 2021, the same day the title was announced as Fantastic Beasts: The Secrets of Dumbledore. On 10 December 2021, a sizzle reel promo was released by Warner Bros. Pictures to celebrate the Wizarding World's twentieth anniversary, showing clips from previous films and events of the franchise and ending with a quick teaser for the film, while also announcing that a full trailer would be released the following Monday. The film's official trailer was officially released on 13 December 2021, with a teaser poster being released the following week. On 22 February 2022, 18 posters featuring characters from the film were released online. A second trailer was announced to be released on Thursday, 24 February 2022 by actor Jude Law through the film's social media, but was later delayed. The trailer was eventually released on 28 February, along with the official poster for the film. The official hardcover screenplay was scheduled to be released on 19 July 2022, three months after the film's theatrical release.

Warner Bros spent over $21 million in television advertisement and promotion merchandise, with the film generating over 958 million impressions on airing channels NBC, ABC, TBS, CBS, and SyFy during the March Madness, Winter Olympics, NBA games and other sports and events. The film was one of the many merchandise that includes Warner Bros. Consumer Products's limited edition art prints from MinaLima calling Harry Potter: The Exhibition, Insight Editions' Fantastic Beasts: Secrets of Dumbledore: Movie Magic, Wizarding World's Niffler Figure with 1 card, Hot Topic's casual clothes and t-shirts, LeSportsac's bag and accessories, Build-A-Bear Workshop's character plushy that includes Niffler, Bowtruckle and more, and Funko Pop's action figure out of characters based on the film. Warner's international YouTube channels received 125.1 million views from Indonesia, Brazil, Ireland, UK, Spain and more countries for the film's promotional material, and was one of the strong viral reposting rates with 18:1.

== Release ==
=== Theatrical ===
Fantastic Beasts: The Secrets of Dumbledore premiered at the Royal Festival Hall in London on 29 March 2022. It was first released to cinemas in Belgium and the Netherlands on 6 April 2022, followed by other European countries, Australia, China, and Japan through 8 April, the United States and Argentina on 15 April, and the Philippines on 16 April. In the United Arab Emirates, Egypt, Saudi Arabia, Qatar, Bahrain, Kuwait, and Lebanon, the film was released on 28 April 2022. The Secrets of Dumbledore was made available to stream on HBO Max on 30 May 2022.

The film was initially scheduled to be released on 12 November 2021, but following Depp's departure, his role's recasting with Mikkelsen and the COVID-19 epidemic, Warner Bros. shifted the release to 15 July 2022. In September 2021, the film's release was pushed forward three months early to 15 April 2022. It was later announced that the film would be released a week earlier in the United Kingdom and Ireland on 8 April 2022.

=== Censorship ===
The Secrets of Dumbledore is the first Wizarding World film to openly address Dumbledore's sexuality, depicting him and Grindelwald as having been lovers. Although Rowling firmly stated in 2007 that Dumbledore was gay, none of the novels in the franchise ever mentioned this. The two dialogues in the film referencing Dumbledore's homosexuality were censored for the film's release in China.

=== Home media ===
Fantastic Beasts: The Secrets of Dumbledore was released for digital download on 30 May 2022, and on Ultra HD Blu-ray, Blu-ray and DVD on 28 June 2022. Over its first month of streaming in HBO Max, the film was streamed in an estimated eight million households.

== Reception ==
=== Box office ===
Fantastic Beasts: The Secrets of Dumbledore grossed $95.9 million in the United States and Canada, and $311.3 million in other territories, for a worldwide total of $407.2 million.

In the United States and Canada, Fantastic Beasts: The Secrets of Dumbledore was projected to gross around $40 million from 4,200 theatres in its opening weekend. The film made $20 million on its first day, including $6 million on the Thursday night previews. It went on to debut to $42.2 million, topping the box office but marking the lowest opening of the Wizarding World franchise. Women over 25 (38%) were the largest demographic, followed by men over 25 (33%). The film grossed $14 million in its second weekend, dropping 67% and finishing in third place behind Sonic the Hedgehog 2 and The Bad Guys marking the second-worst second weekend drop for the Wizarding World franchise after Harry Potter and the Deathly Hallows – Part 2 saw a 72% second weekend drop in 2011.

Outside the U.S. and Canada, the film earned $56.9 million from 22 international markets in its opening weekend. In Germany, the film's $9.2 million debut was the best opening for Warner Bros. since 2019's Joker. The film made $71.7 million in its second weekend. This included openings of $7.1 million in both France and Mexico, the latter of which was the second-biggest opening for Warner Bros. during the pandemic. It added $38.3 million in its third international weekend, crossing the $200 million worldwide mark. It crossed the $300 million mark in its fourth weekend.

=== Critical response ===
On review aggregator Rotten Tomatoes, the film has an approval rating of 46% based on 248 reviews, with an average rating of 5.4/10. The website's critics consensus states: "Fantastic Beasts: The Secrets of Dumbledore avoids some of the pitfalls that plagued its predecessor, but lacks much of the magic that drew audiences into the Wizarding World many movies ago." Metacritic assigned the film a weighted average score of 47 out of 100 based on 49 critics, indicating "mixed or average" reviews and marking the lowest score on the site for a Wizarding World film. Audiences polled by CinemaScore gave the film an average grade of "B+" on an A+ to F scale, tied for the lowest of the franchise with The Crimes of Grindelwald, while those at PostTrak gave it an 81% positive score, with 63% saying they would definitely recommend it.

A particular focus of praise from some reviews was that Mads Mikkelsen outperformed Johnny Depp in the role of Grindelwald.

=== Accolades ===
Award	Date of the ceremony	Category	Recipients	Result	Ref.
Saturn Awards	25 October 2022	Best Fantasy Film	Fantastic Beasts: The Secrets of Dumbledore	Nominated	
Visual Effects Society	15 February 2023	Outstanding Visual Effects in a Photoreal Feature	Christian Manz, Olly Young, Benjamin Loch, Stephane Naze, and Alistair Williams	Nominated	
Visual Effects Society	15 February 2023	Outstanding Effects Simulations in a Photoreal Feature	Jesse Parker Holmes, Grayden Solman, Toyokazu Hirai, and Rob Richardson	Nominated	

== Future ==
The Fantastic Beasts film series was initially speculated to be a trilogy, but in October 2016, Rowling announced that the series would be composed of five films, later confirming that the story of the series would consist of a sequence of events that occurred between 1926 and 1945. In February 2022, producer David Heyman revealed that work on the script for a fourth film had not yet begun. In April 2022, Variety reported that Warner Bros. greenlighting the final two instalments would be dependent on the critical and commercial performance of The Secrets of Dumbledore. Mikkelsen believed that Depp could return as Grindelwald in another film.

In November 2022, Variety reported that Warner Bros. Discovery was not actively planning to continue the Fantastic Beasts series or develop further films in the Wizarding World franchise. In October 2023, Yates made comments that the series had been "parked", while also disclosing that the idea of it being a five-film series had been a "surprise" after many had only initially committed to doing a single film. In October 2024, Redmayne stated that The Secrets of Dumbledore was likely to be the last Fantastic Beasts film, pointing to the Universal Orlando Resort attraction in Florida as the next place to feature Newt. That same month, Law also said he did not foresee more films being made, citing Warner Bros. focusing on the forthcoming Harry Potter television series.

== See also ==
- List of films about witchcraft
