= Minerva McGonagall =

Character from Harry Potter

- Harry Potter character
- Maggie Smith as Minerva McGonagall
- First appearance: Harry Potter and the Philosopher's Stone (1997)
- Created by: J. K. Rowling
- Portrayed by: Maggie Smith (main films); Fiona Glascott (Fantastic Beasts); Janet McTeer (television series)

In-universe information
- Occupation: Professor of Transfiguration
- Family: Robert McGonagall (father); Isobel Ross (mother)
- Spouses: Elphinstone Urquart (husband; deceased)
- Nationality: Scottish
- House: Gryffindor

Minerva McGonagall is a character in the Harry Potter series of novels by J. K. Rowling. McGonagall is a professor at Hogwarts School of Witchcraft and Wizardry, where she is also the head of Gryffindor House and the deputy headmistress under Albus Dumbledore. McGonagall was portrayed by Maggie Smith in the Harry Potter films and then by Fiona Glascott in the Fantastic Beasts prequel films The Crimes of Grindelwald and The Secrets of Dumbledore.

== Appearances ==
=== Novels ===
McGonagall is introduced at the beginning of Harry Potter and the Philosopher's Stone (1997) when she accompanies Albus Dumbledore as he delivers the infant Harry Potter to the Dursley residence. When Harry arrives at Hogwarts a decade later, he meets McGonagall, who is the Transfiguration professor and the head of Gryffindor House. After noticing Harry's broomstick flying skills, McGonagall introduces him to the Gryffindor Quidditch team captain Oliver Wood. Once Harry qualifies for the Quidditch team, McGonagall buys him a Nimbus 2000 broomstick.

In Harry Potter and the Chamber of Secrets (1998), McGonagall becomes acting headmistress after Dumbledore is suspended by the Ministry of Magic. When she discovers that Ginny Weasley has been taken into the Chamber of Secrets, she orders Professor Gilderoy Lockhart to rescue her. After Lockhart proves incompetent, Ginny is saved by Harry and Ron Weasley.

At the beginning of Harry Potter and the Prisoner of Azkaban (1999), McGonagall gives Hermione Granger a Time-Turner to allow her to take multiple classes at the same time. After Harry's Nimbus 2000 is destroyed, he is sent a Firebolt, but McGonagall confiscates it. She suspects it is cursed, but eventually finds it to be safe.

In Harry Potter and the Goblet of Fire (2000), McGonagall is concerned for Harry's safety when he is mysteriously selected for the Triwizard Tournament. After the death of Cedric Diggory, she joins Albus Dumbledore and Severus Snape in rescuing Harry from the Death Eater Barty Crouch Jr.

McGonagall joins the secret organisation Order of the Phoenix in Harry Potter and the Order of the Phoenix (2003). After the Ministry-appointed Defence Against the Dark Arts professor Dolores Umbridge refuses to teach students practical defensive magic, McGonagall supports Harry, Ron and Hermione as they form the self-defence group Dumbledore's Army. While attempting to protect Rubeus Hagrid from Umbridge, McGonagall is assaulted by Aurors and sent to St Mungo's Hospital. She eventually recovers and returns to Hogwarts before the end of the school year.

In Harry Potter and the Half-Blood Prince (2005), McGonagall duels with the Death Eater Alecto Carrow during the Battle of the Astronomy Tower. McGonagall is appointed headmistress after Dumbledore's death, but is replaced by Snape when Voldemort takes control of Hogwarts in Harry Potter and the Deathly Hallows (2007). She continues to teach, and is present when Harry, Ron and Hermione return to Hogwarts searching for Ravenclaw's diadem. Soon after, McGonagall banishes Snape from Hogwarts. She prepares the school's defences prior to Voldemort's assault, and helps evacuate the younger students to Hogsmeade. During the Battle of Hogwarts, McGonagall duels with Voldemort alongside Horace Slughorn and Kingsley Shacklebolt.

=== Film adaptations ===
McGonagall is portrayed by Maggie Smith in seven of the eight Harry Potter films; the only instalment in which she does not appear being Harry Potter and the Deathly Hallows – Part 1 (2011). Reportedly, she was the only actor whose involvement J.K. Rowling had specifically requested. Despite receiving praise from Rowling for her performance, Smith said that acting in the films was not fully satisfying. However, she said she enjoyed being a part of the franchise because it allowed her to bond with her grandchildren. Smith underwent intensive chemotherapy for breast cancer while filming the sixth film of the series. The treatment left her feeling "horribly sick", but she eventually made a full recovery.

=== Fantastic Beasts ===
McGonagall appears as a Hogwarts professor in the prequel films Fantastic Beasts: The Crimes of Grindelwald (2018) and Fantastic Beasts: The Secrets of Dumbledore (2022). Several websites have pointed out that according to timeline details provided in Order of the Phoenix, McGonagall would not have been teaching at Hogwarts during the events of these films. Her inclusion in the series consequently upset some fans. McGonagall is portrayed by Fiona Glascott in the films.

=== Television adaptation ===
McGonagall is set to be portrayed by Janet McTeer in the upcoming HBO television series Harry Potter.

=== Stage adaptation ===
The 2016 stage play Harry Potter and the Cursed Child is set nineteen years after Voldemort's death. In the play, McGonagall is the headmistress of Hogwarts.

== Characterisation ==
McGonagall is a formidable woman who is skilled in many forms of magic, notably Transfiguration. She is able to perform certain spells without the use of a wand. She is a registered Animagus, which allows her to transform into a domestic cat at will. McGonagall is held in high regard by her peers and the students of Hogwarts. She is known for her sternness and dry sense of humour and speaks with a Scottish accent. Minerva McGonagall shares some traits with the Roman goddess Minerva (known as Athena in Greek mythology).

== Reception ==
The entertainment website IGN wrote that McGonagall is usually "a strict disciplinarian" but can also be a "cool aunt" who occasionally allows mischief.

Smith received acclaim for her performance in the films. Smith's role in the films is credited with introducing her to a younger generation, many of whom had not heard of Smith before prior to Harry Potter despite being a seasoned veteran.
