= William Nadylam =

French actor (born c.1966)

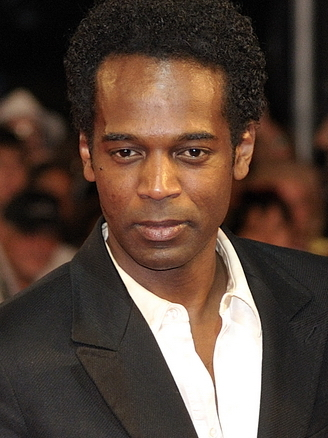
- Nadylam in 2009
- Born: c. 1966 (age 59–60); Montpellier, France
- Occupation: Actor
- Years active: 1988 – present

William Nadylam (born c. 1966) is a French actor.

He is known for playing the role of Yusuf Kama in the Fantastic Beasts film series from the Wizarding World franchise.

== Filmography ==
=== Film ===
Year	Title	Role	Notes
1988	Black Mic-mac 2	Jonathan	
1997	Tout le monde descend	Stanley Noié	short
1998	Kirikou and the Sorceress	Adult Kirikou	voice
1998	Le dernier fils	Paul Touré-Haas	TV movie
2001	Le mal du pays	Félix	short
2001	Mauvais genres	Maeva	
2002	Mille millièmes	Maximilien Diallo	
2003	La légende de Parva	Shiva	voice
2004	Table rase	Hyacinthe	TV movie
2004	Une autre vie	Ismaël Traoré	TV movie
2004	Une autre vie	Ismaël Traoré	TV movie
2006	Les enfants du pays	Caporal-chef Malick N'Diaye	
2006	Passés troubles	Peratti	TV movie
2007	Rizla & McGee	McGee	short
2007	Les mariées de l'isle Bourbon	Jean Penmach	TV movie
2009	L'Absence	Adama	
2009	La guerre des saintes	Le novice	
2009	Transit	Lawrence	short
2009	White Material	Chérif, the mayor	
2010	Vital désir	Me Collinot	TV movie
2014	Here and Now	Ben	
2014	L'affaire SK1	Advocat of Guy George	
2015	Lace Crater	Dr. Sal Gricky	
2016	Good Funk	Terence	
2017	La vie de château	Ben Benito	uncredited
2018	Fantastic Beasts: The Crimes of Grindelwald	Yusuf Kama	
2021	Stillwater	Patrick	
2022	Fantastic Beasts: The Secrets of Dumbledore	Yusuf Kama	
2023	Lame de foud	Marc Spencer	TV movie
2023	Coup de chance	Charles	

=== TV series ===
Year	Title	Role	Notes
2004	Murphy's Law	Benoit	1 episode
2007	Les Oubliées	Le juge Galbert	6 episodes
2016	Trepalium		1 episode
2020	Parlement	Eamon	8 episodes

== See also ==
- List of French actors
- List of voice actors
