= The Duel (2010 film) =

- Theatrical release poster
- Directed by: Dover Kosashvili
- Written by: Mary Bing
- Based on: The Duel by Anton Chekhov
- Produced by: Donald Rosenfeld; Mary Bing
- Starring: Andrew Scott; Fiona Glascott; Tobias Menzies; Niall Buggy
- Cinematography: Paul Sarossy
- Edited by: Kate Williams
- Music by: Angelo Milli
- Production company: High Line Productions
- Distributed by: High Line Productions
- Release date: 28 April 2010
- Running time: 95 minutes
- Country: United States
- Language: English

Anton Chekhov's The Duel is a 2010 film directed by Dover Kosashvili. The film is an adaptation of the 1891 novella The Duel by Anton Chekhov. Set in a seaside resort in the Caucasus, the story centers on Laevsky (Andrew Scott), an aristocratic civil servant, and his mistress Nadya (Fiona Glascott), whom Laevsky is trying to abandon. The screenplay was written by Mary Bing. The Duel was filmed in Croatia. The film's cast is made up of British and Irish actors. It has generally received positive reviews.

== Plot ==
Ivan Andreitch Laevsky, an educated Russian aristocrat, runs off with a married woman, Nadyezyhda Fyodorovna (Nadya), to the Black Sea. He gets a job in the civil service, but is careless about his work, mostly drinking and playing cards. He eventually falls out of love and becomes bored with Nadya, who has affairs with other men, and he wants to leave her. He receives a letter telling him that Nadya's husband has died (and therefore she is free to marry him). He hides the letter and does not tell Nadya. That, he says, would be like inviting her to marry him.

Laevsky confides his problem with his friend, military doctor Alexandr Daviditch Samoylenko. Samoylenko urges Laevsky to marry Nadya, even if he does not love her. Laevsky does not want to do that, but cannot leave her because she has no money, no relatives, and no means to survive. Samoylenko says that if he must leave her, he must do so humanely, by giving her enough money to live on. Laevsky says he is 2,000 roubles in debt and cannot afford to do that.

Samoylenko has two boarders in his house. One boarder is zoologist Nikolay Vassilitch Von Koren. The other boarder is a deacon in the Russian church.

Laevsky decides to leave the town for Petersburg. He says that he will go first and send for Nadya after he is settled, but Samoylenko and Von Koren (who hates Laevsky) know that this will be his way to abandon her. But he has no money, so he asks Samoylenko to loan him 100 roubles. Samoylenko agrees, but does not have 100 roubles, so he tells Laevsky he will have to borrow it in turn from a third party. After Laevsky leaves, Samoylenko asks Von Koren to advance him 100 roubles. Von Koren gives Samoylenko 100 roubles, but on the condition that Laevsky agrees to take Nadya with him to Petersburg.

Laevsky returns a day later to try to get the money. Von Koren treats him contemptuously, and refers to his "problems." Laevsky becomes furious, and accuses Samoylenko of revealing his personal matters. Samoylenko denies it. Laevsky tells them to leave him alone, or "I will fight you." Von Koren twists this to mean a challenge to a duel, and accepts. Laevsky agrees, their friends cannot talk them out of it, and they make arrangements for a duel with pistols.

Meanwhile, Nadya is pursued by Kirilin, the police captain. They once had sex, which she calls "a mistake," and Kirilin is blackmailing Nadya into having sex with him again. She cries and begs him but finally agrees to meet him again that night and one more night. Atchmianov, the son of the Armenian shopkeeper where Nadya buys her clothes, was also pursuing Nadya, but she rejected him. He finds out about her assignation with Kirilin.

The night before the duel, Laevsky is drinking and playing cards. Atchmianov tells Laevsky to follow him to meet someone about "very important business." He leads Laevsky to the room where Kirilin and Nadya are having sex. Laevsky goes home even more upset about Nadya than about the duel.

The morning of the duel, their friends try to talk them into forgiving each other, and Laevsky agrees and apologizes, but Von Koren, despite their entreaties, insists on going through. Laevsky deliberately fires into the air. Von Koren, who is a practiced pistol shot, takes aim at Laevsky's head. Meanwhile, the deacon, who has been hurrying to the scene, appears over a hill and shouts. Von Koren fires and misses Laevsky.

They go home, and Laevsky finally recovers. He falls in love with Nadya again. Three weeks later, they have been married. Laevsky is working hard to pay off his debts. Von Koren is leaving. He is amazed at Laevsky's transformation, and says that if Laevsky had been like this originally, they could have been good friends. He stops by Laevsky's house before he leaves. Laevsky and Nadya greet him warmly, he shakes hands, and they say emotional goodbyes.

== Cast ==
- Andrew Scott as Laevsky
- Fiona Glascott as Nadya
- Tobias Menzies as Von Koren
- Niall Buggy as Samoylenko
- Rik Makarem as Atchmianov
- Nicholas Rowe as Sheshkovsky
- Michelle Fairley as Marya
- Simon Trinder as Postal Superintendent
- Debbie Chazen as Olga
- Graham Turner as Atchmianov Senior
- Jeremy Swift as Deacon

== Reception ==
Rotten Tomatoes gives the film a score of 81% based on 26 reviews, with an average rating of 7 out of 10. Metacritic gives the film a score of 75% based on reviews from 16 critics.
