= L'Absence =

- Directed by: Mama Kéïta
- Screenplay by: Mama Kéïta
- Produced by: Kinterfin
- Starring: William Nadylam, Ibrahima Mbaye, Mouss Diouf, Mame Ndoumé Diop, Jackie Tavernier
- Cinematography: Remi Mazet
- Edited by: Miriame Chamekh
- Music by: Mathieur Normant
- Release date: 2009
- Running time: 82 minutes
- Countries: France; Senegal

L'Absence is a 2009 film.

== Synopsis ==
After doing brilliantly in his studies and a 15-year absence, Adama, a young polytechnician, rushes back to Senegal, his home country, when he receives a telegram saying his grandmother is very ill. His brief stay will revive a family drama seemingly forgotten. The film reflects director Mama Keïta's experience with African students who study abroad and are content to be spectators of the poverty and violence in Africa.

== Awards ==
- Fespaco 2009
