= Albus Dumbledore =

Fictional character from Harry Potter

- Harry Potter character
- Michael Gambon as Albus Dumbledore (Note: Harry Potter and the Prisoner of Azkaban (2004))
- First appearance: Harry Potter and the Philosopher's Stone (1997)
- Created by: J. K. Rowling
- Portrayed by: Richard Harris (Note: Philosopher's Stone Chamber of Secrets); Michael Gambon (Note: Prisoner of Azkaban Goblet of Fire Order of the Phoenix Half-Blood Prince Deathly Hallows – Part 1 Deathly Hallows – Part 2); Jude Law (Note: Fantastic Beasts: The Crimes of Grindelwald Fantastic Beasts: The Secrets of Dumbledore); Toby Regbo (Note: Deathly Hallows – Part 1 (young) The Crimes of Grindelwald (young)); John Lithgow (Note: Television series)
- Romance(s): Gellert Grindelwald

In-universe information
- Full name: Albus Percival Wulfric; Brian Dumbledore
- Occupation: Headmaster of Hogwarts Professor of Hogwarts
- Family: Percival Dumbledore (father); Kendra Dumbledore (mother); Aberforth Dumbledore (brother); Ariana Dumbledore (sister); Aurelius Dumbledore (nephew)
- Nationality: British
- House: Gryffindor
- Born: 1881
- Died: 30 June 1997

Headmaster of Hogwarts School of Witchcraft and Wizardly
- In office 1971 – 1996 (Note: Briefly suspended in 1993)
- Preceded by: Armando; Dippet
- Succeeded by: Dolores Umbridge
- In office 1996 – 30th June 1997
- Preceded by: Dolores Umbridge
- Succeeded by: Minerva McGonagall

Supreme Mugwump of the International Confederation of Wizards
- In office ???–1995
- Preceded by: ???
- Succeeded by: ???

Chief Warlock of the Wizengamot
- In office ???–1995
- Preceded by: ???
- Succeeded by: ??

Albus Dumbledore is a fictional character in the Harry Potter series of novels by J. K. Rowling. For most of the series, he served as the headmaster of the wizarding school Hogwarts until 1997. He is considered one of the most powerful and influential wizards of his time, and is the founder and leader of the Order of the Phoenix, an organization dedicated to fighting the Dark wizard Lord Voldemort.

Dumbledore is portrayed by Richard Harris in the film adaptations of Harry Potter and the Philosopher's Stone (2001) and Harry Potter and the Chamber of Secrets (2002). Following Harris' death in October 2002, Michael Gambon was cast in the role. He plays Dumbledore in six Harry Potter films, which were released from 2004 to 2011. Jude Law portrays a middle-aged version of Dumbledore in the prequel films Fantastic Beasts: The Crimes of Grindelwald (2018) and Fantastic Beasts: The Secrets of Dumbledore (2022). John Lithgow is set to portray Dumbledore in the upcoming HBO series Harry Potter.

== Character ==
In a 1999 interview, Rowling stated that she imagined Dumbledore as elderly and stately, and compared him to John Gielgud. In the novels, Dumbledore is described as tall and thin, with a long and crooked nose, long fingers and bright blue eyes. His hair and beard are described as long and silver. He wears half-moon spectacles and a colourful array of robes. In 2000, Rowling said that Dumbledore is a hundred and fifty years old during the events of the novels. However, she has stated on her website that he was born in 1881, which makes him either 115 or 116 when he dies in the sixth novel.

Rowling has described Dumbledore as very wise and "the epitome of goodness". She said he is a mentor to Harry Potter, and he knows that Harry will need to learn difficult lessons to prepare him for challenges in his life. According to Rowling, Dumbledore "allows Harry to get into what he would not allow another pupil to do, and he also unwillingly permits Harry to confront things he'd rather protect him from." Dumbledore's demeanour is often described as serene, ethereal and composed, and he rarely displays strong emotions. He is eccentric, slightly effeminate and fond of knitting. He is known for his odd displays of whimsicality, and he often uses humour to put others at ease. His eyes are sometimes described as twinkling with kindness or mischief. Dumbledore is highly perceptive and emotionally intelligent, and has a deep capacity for love. Dumbledore's personality also has a more steely aspect. When he apprehends Barty Crouch Jr in Goblet of Fire, the look upon his face is described as full of "cold fury" and "more terrible than Harry could have ever imagined."

Dumbledore is considered by many characters to be the most powerful wizard alive. Some say he is the only wizard Voldemort ever feared. During his education at Hogwarts, Dumbledore was in Gryffindor House. He was the most brilliant student the school had ever known, winning "every prize of note that the school offered", and doing "things with a wand [the examiner had] never seen before". Rowling has said that Dumbledore is primarily self-taught, although he "had access to superb teachers at Hogwarts". Dumbledore readily acknowledges that he is unusually intelligent and an exceptionally powerful wizard. He is skilled in Occlumency, Legilimency and Transfiguration, and is the owner of the powerful Elder Wand, which is one of the Deathly Hallows.

In spite of Dumbledore's many extraordinary qualities, he is a flawed character. According to Rowling, "Although Dumbledore seems to be so benign for six books, he's quite a Machiavellian figure, really. He's been pulling a lot of strings." In a 2005 interview, Rowling commented: "Immense brainpower does not protect you from emotional mistakes, and I think Dumbledore really exemplifies that." In the novels, Dumbledore admits a number of times to Harry that he makes mistakes, and since he is smarter than most people, his mistakes "tend to be correspondingly huger". Rowling has said that Dumbledore speaks for her, the author, as he knows almost everything about the Harry Potter universe.

Dumbledore describes his desire for power as his greatest flaw. He eventually finds that those best suited for power are those who do not seek it. When he and Grindelwald first meet, they make plans to enslave Muggles and re-establish wizards as the natural rulers of the world. Dumbledore becomes disillusioned with this idea after his sister Ariana is killed during a duel between himself, his brother Aberforth, and Grindelwald. Dumbledore becomes riddled with guilt over the circumstances surrounding the death of his sister. He is tortured for the rest of his life by the possibility that he might have been the one who cast the spell that killed her. When he looks into the Mirror of Erised, he sees himself redeemed in the eyes of his brother and his entire family alive and together.

The name "Dumbledore" is borrowed from a dialectal word for "bumblebee". Rowling chose the name because Dumbledore loves music, and she imagined him walking around and humming to himself frequently.

== Appearances in novels ==
=== Harry Potter and the Philosopher's Stone ===
Dumbledore is introduced in the opening chapter of the first novel in the series, Harry Potter and the Philosopher's Stone (1997). Under cover of night, he brings the infant Harry Potter to the home of Harry's uncle and aunt, Vernon and Petunia Dursley. Harry's parents were killed by the Dark wizard Voldemort, and Dumbledore hopes he will be safe with the Dursleys. He leaves Harry on the doorstep with a letter explaining the situation. When Harry arrives at Hogwarts ten years later, Dumbledore tells him about the Mirror of Erised, a magical object that protects the Philosopher's Stone. Dumbledore is summoned to the Ministry of Magic by a false message on the night when Harry, Ron Weasley, Hermione Granger, and Professor Quirinus Quirrell enter the dungeons to retrieve the Stone. He realises during the trip that he is needed at Hogwarts, and returns in time to rescue Harry from Quirrell and Voldemort.

=== Harry Potter and the Chamber of Secrets ===
Dumbledore returns in the second novel, Harry Potter and the Chamber of Secrets (1998). Through a magical diary, Harry sees a younger Dumbledore in a series of flashbacks. The diary once belonged to Tom Riddle, who eventually became Voldemort. In one flashback, Harry sees Dumbledore questioning Riddle about a series of attacks on Muggle-born students. In the present, a basilisk emerges from the Chamber of Secrets and begins attacking people in Hogwarts. Following the attacks, Lucius Malfoy convinces the governors of Hogwarts to suspend Dumbledore from his position as Headmaster. Dumbledore is reinstated when it is revealed that Lucius coerced the governors into suspending him.

=== Harry Potter and the Prisoner of Azkaban ===
At the beginning of Harry Potter and the Prisoner of Azkaban (1999), Dumbledore is forced to accept the presence of Dementors at Hogwarts. The Dementors have been sent to protect the students from Sirius Black, a supposed murderer who escaped from the wizard prison Azkaban. When Black breaches Hogwarts, Dumbledore closes every entrance to the school and grounds. After the Dementors cause Harry to fall off his broom during a Quidditch match, Dumbledore becomes angry and uses his wand to help Harry return safely to the ground. Later, Dumbledore suggests that Hermione use her Time-Turner to save Black and Buckbeak the hippogriff from execution.

=== Harry Potter and the Goblet of Fire ===
In Harry Potter and the Goblet of Fire (2000), Dumbledore brings the Triwizard Tournament to Hogwarts. He also serves as a judge throughout the event. After the final task of the tournament, Harry returns from an encounter with Voldemort. Professor Mad-Eye Moody escorts Harry into the castle, and Dumbledore becomes suspicious. He discovers that Moody is actually Barty Crouch Jr., and that the real Moody is being held prisoner by Crouch. Later, Dumbledore listens to Harry's account of Voldemort's return.

=== Harry Potter and the Order of the Phoenix ===
In the fifth novel in the series, Harry Potter and the Order of the Phoenix (2003), Dumbledore is removed from his position as Chief Warlock of the Wizengamot, voted out of the Chairmanship of the International Confederation of Wizards, and is almost stripped of his Order of Merlin First Class due to his speeches regarding the return of Voldemort. Meanwhile, the Ministry of Magic attempts to discredit him and Harry, often through the Daily Prophet. Dumbledore enrages Minister for Magic Cornelius Fudge when he intercedes at a hearing to prevent Harry from being expelled from Hogwarts.

The Ministry passes Educational Decree Twenty-two, which allows Fudge to appoint Dolores Umbridge as the professor of Defence Against the Dark Arts. Through her, Fudge gradually gains power over Hogwarts and Dumbledore, whom he fears is amassing an underage wizard army to overthrow the Ministry. Umbridge forbids students from practicing defensive spells in her class, which prompts Harry, Ron, and Hermione to form a secret practice group called Dumbledore's Army. When the Ministry discovers the group, Dumbledore shields his students from punishment by falsely claiming that it was his idea. He is removed from the position of headmaster for the second time.

When the Order of the Phoenix battles Voldemort's Death Eaters in the Department of Mysteries, Dumbledore arrives to aid them. He subdues most of the Death Eaters and binds them with an Anti-Disapparition Jinx to prevent them from escaping. He then engages in a duel with Voldemort, who tries to possess Harry so Dumbledore will kill him. After this ruse fails, Voldemort is forced to flee with Bellatrix Lestrange. Several Ministry officials witness the end of the battle, which leads to Dumbledore being reinstated as headmaster. Dumbledore explains to Harry that Voldemort chose Harry as his equal, and that either he or Voldemort must eventually kill the other.

=== Harry Potter and the Half-Blood Prince ===
In Harry Potter and the Half-Blood Prince (2005), Dumbledore brings Harry along as he attempts to persuade Horace Slughorn to rejoin the Hogwarts faculty. Harry notices that Dumbledore's right hand is shrivelled and blackened. During the school year, Dumbledore uses the Pensieve to teach Harry about Voldemort's life and his rise to power. In one of the Pensieve visions, Harry witnesses Dumbledore's first encounter with the young Tom Riddle. Dumbledore had known from the beginning that Riddle was dangerous, but believed that Hogwarts would change him.

Dumbledore and Harry learn that Voldemort created six Horcruxes to gain immortality, and that they must be destroyed before Voldemort can be killed. Harry repeatedly warns Dumbledore that Draco Malfoy is an agent of Voldemort, but Dumbledore refuses to take action against Draco. He tells Harry that he already knows more about what is happening than Harry does. Near the end of the novel, Dumbledore and Harry enter a cave in search of a Horcrux. Dumbledore drinks a potion inside the Horcrux's container and begins to scream in agony. When Harry attempts to retrieve some lake water for Dumbledore to drink, he is attacked by Inferi that reside in the lake. They try to drown Harry, but Dumbledore rescues him.

Dumbledore and Harry arrive in the Hogwarts Astronomy Tower with the Horcrux. Dumbledore asks Harry not to interfere in the events that are about to take place, and puts him in a body-binding curse. Immobilized, Harry is unable to intervene as Draco arrives and disarms Dumbledore. Several other Death Eaters then enter the tower and try to persuade Draco to kill Dumbledore. When Draco hesitates, Severus Snape appears and performs the killing curse on the headmaster. His funeral is attended by students, Hogwarts staff, members of the Ministry of Magic and others. He is entombed in a marble sarcophagus beside the Hogwarts lake.

=== Harry Potter and the Deathly Hallows ===
Details of Dumbledore's earlier life are revealed in Harry Potter and the Deathly Hallows (2007). The novel introduces his parents, Percival and Kendra Dumbledore, and his younger sister, Ariana (his younger brother, Aberforth, is mentioned in previous books). At the age of six, Ariana was attacked by three Muggle boys who witnessed her performing magic. She was deeply traumatised and was never able to control her magic again. Enraged, Percival attacked the boys and was given a life sentence in Azkaban. Kendra subsequently moved the family to the village of Godric's Hollow. Around the time that Albus completed his education, Ariana accidentally killed their mother. Albus became the head of the family and remained in their house with Ariana while Aberforth finished school.

Soon afterward, Dumbledore befriended the young wizard Gellert Grindelwald. They dreamed of uniting the three Deathly Hallows – the Elder Wand, the Resurrection Stone and the Cloak of Invisibility – and creating a world in which wizards rule over Muggles. One day, an argument between Albus, Aberforth, and Grindelwald led to a duel that resulted in Ariana's death. For the rest of his life, Albus felt guilty, never certain whether it was his own curse or another's that killed his sister. He felt he could not be trusted with power and turned down the position of Minister for Magic multiple times, eventually returning to Hogwarts as a professor of Transfiguration. Decades later, Dumbledore faced and defeated Grindelwald, who had become a Dark wizard and had obtained the Elder Wand. Dumbledore now possessed not only the Elder Wand but also the Cloak of Invisibility, which he had borrowed from James Potter before his death. Dumbledore would eventually pass the cloak on to Harry.

The truth about Dumbledore's death is revealed to Harry through Snape's memories in the Pensieve. Harry learns that Dumbledore put on a cursed ring that held the Resurrection Stone, which he hoped would allow him to apologise to his sister and parents. The curse damaged his hand, and Snape told him he would die in about a year. Dumbledore then revealed to Snape that he knew about Draco's attempts to kill him. Since Dumbledore was close to death, he asked Snape to use the killing curse on him. This act of self-sacrifice would prevent Draco's soul from being damaged by committing murder, and would cause Voldemort to trust Snape completely.

Near the end of the novel, Harry is struck by Voldemort's killing curse. He finds himself in an ethereal realm with Dumbledore, who confesses many regrets from earlier in his life. He informs Harry that he can return to his body and face the Dark Lord again. Harry returns, kills Voldemort, then places the Elder Wand in Dumbledore's tomb. In the book's epilogue, it is revealed that Harry named his second son Albus Severus Potter, after Dumbledore and Snape.

== Portrayal in other media ==
=== Film ===
Dumbledore as portrayed in film. Clockwise from upper left: Richard Harris, Michael Gambon and Jude Law.

In the film adaptations of Philosopher's Stone (2001) and Chamber of Secrets (2002), Dumbledore is portrayed by Richard Harris, who was expected to play the character throughout the entire series. Before Harris was cast, Patrick McGoohan reportedly had an interest in the role, but could not commit due to health issues. Sean Connery was approached, but declined due to the film's subject matter. Harris turned down the role three times but eventually accepted it because his 11-year-old granddaughter threatened to never speak to him again if he did not take it. Harris was determined to portray Dumbledore again in Prisoner of Azkaban (2004), despite having been diagnosed with Hodgkin's lymphoma, and asked David Heyman not to recast the role. However, his death in October 2002 led to recasting.

Christopher Lee was the producers' first choice for replacing Harris. However, Lee's commitments as Saruman in The Lord of the Rings trilogy and Count Dooku in the Star Wars prequels forced him to decline. Ian McKellen was offered the role but turned it down, as he had recently played another wizard character, Gandalf, in The Lord of the Rings. In addition, Harris had called McKellen a "dreadful" actor, and McKellen did not wish to take Harris' role. Harry Robinson, who was a body double for Harris in Chamber of Secrets, was also considered for the part. Harris' family reportedly wanted Peter O'Toole to be cast, but Michael Gambon was ultimately chosen. (Note: Attributed to multiple references:) Gambon adopted a slight Irish accent for the role, which he reprised in all the remaining Harry Potter films.

In flashback scenes in Deathly Hallows – Part 1 and Part 2, a young Dumbledore is portrayed by Toby Regbo. In the prequel films Fantastic Beasts: The Crimes of Grindelwald (2018) and Fantastic Beasts: The Secrets of Dumbledore (2022), Dumbledore is played by Jude Law.

=== Stage ===
Dumbledore appears in the play Harry Potter and the Cursed Child (2016), which was written by Jack Thorne from a story by Thorne, J. K. Rowling and John Tiffany. The plot occurs nineteen years after the events of Deathly Hallows, and features time-travel elements.

=== Television ===
Dumbledore is set to be portrayed by John Lithgow in Harry Potter, an upcoming HBO television series based on the Harry Potter novels.

== Reception ==
Albus Dumbledore has been compared to other archetypal "wise old man" characters. As writer Evelyn Perry noted, "Dumbledore resembles Merlin both personally and physically; he is an avid lover of books and wisdom who wears flowing robes and a long, white beard." Dumbledore has also been compared to Gandalf from J. R. R. Tolkien's The Lord of the Rings. Dave Kopel has drawn comparisons between Rowling's writing and John Bunyan's The Pilgrim's Progress, and has asserted that Dumbledore acts like "the bearded God the Father" figure in which Harry puts his faith to be saved from Voldemort and his servants. The entertainment website IGN claimed that Dumbledore has "taken his place among the great mentor figures in literature and film". After Michael Gambon took over the role of Dumbledore in the film series, he received criticism for his louder, more aggressive, portrayal of the character compared to Richard Harris' version. Kat Rosenfield of MTV attributed Gambon's portrayal to his policy of not reading the source material from which his films are adapted.

In an interview on the DVD of Harry Potter and the Chamber of Secrets (2002), the film's screenwriter Steve Kloves said that the character Dumbledore carries the future of the wizarding world, and he uses humour and whimsy to cope with the heaviness of this burden.

=== Sexual orientation ===
In October 2007, while answering questions during a book reading at Carnegie Hall, Rowling was asked if Dumbledore had ever been in love. She replied that she always thought of Dumbledore as being homosexual. She discussed for the first time his romantic relationship with his rival Gellert Grindelwald, describing it as a tragedy; she did not explicitly state whether Grindelwald returned Dumbledore's affections. (Note: Attributed to multiple references:) She explained that Dumbledore lost his moral compass when he fell in love, which led him to become interested for a brief time in wizard domination over Muggles. Rowling added that Dumbledore subsequently did not trust his own moral judgment, and became asexual and celibate.

During production of the 2009 film Harry Potter and the Half-Blood Prince, Rowling informed director David Yates of Dumbledore's sexuality by writing a note in the screenplay. She crossed out a section where Dumbledore describes his attraction to a woman, and wrote "Dumbledore is gay." When Yates learned about Dumbledore's sexuality, he recalled thinking it was "pretty cool". Michael Gambon, who portrays Dumbledore in six of the eight Harry Potter films, was reportedly amused by the revelation. Daniel Radcliffe, who plays Harry in the film series, found the news "hilarious".

The revelation of Dumbledore's sexuality occurred after the publication of the final novel, and made international news. Some gay rights activists and organizations praised Rowling, while others wished she had gone further to promote acceptance of homosexuality. A spokesman for the advocacy group Stonewall applauded the revelation, saying "It's great that JK has said this. It shows that there's no limit to what gay and lesbian people can do, even being a wizard headmaster." The gay rights campaigner Peter Tatchell welcomed the news about Dumbledore, but was disappointed that Rowling did not mention his sexuality in the novels. In an editorial for The Guardian, the journalist James Ball wrote that depicting "the respected, heroic and beloved Albus Dumbledore as [a] fully realised gay character—whose sexuality was merely incidental to his achievements—would have provided a fictional role model like no other. With homophobic bullying still such a significant issue in schools, this is a missed opportunity". Writing for Time, John Cloud argued that Dumbledore's silence about his sexuality implies that he is ashamed of it. Cloud claimed this silence "suggests a lack of personal integrity that is completely out of character".

Melissa Anelli, the webmaster of the fan site The Leaky Cauldron, praised the revelation, saying it promoted tolerance towards homosexuality. She added, "By dubbing someone so respected, so talented and so kind, as someone who just happens to be also homosexual, [Rowling is] reinforcing the idea that a person's gayness is not something of which they should be ashamed." Mark Harris of Entertainment Weekly said Rowling's choice "to make a beloved professor-mentor gay in a world where gay teachers are still routinely slandered as malign influences was, I am certain, no accident." Mike Thomas of the Orlando Sentinel claimed that Rowling displayed great skill by writing a gay character without labelling him as gay.

In a 2016 article, Aja Romano of Vox observed a critical stance among many Harry Potter fans towards Rowling's revelation. Romano asserted that because Dumbledore's homosexuality was revealed after his death, certain fans felt that Rowling contributed to a "longstanding, problematic 'dead gays' trope" instead of showing the headmaster "living out his queer identity". After the release of the film Fantastic Beasts: The Crimes of Grindelwald (2018), Delia Harrington of Den of Geek criticised the film's failure to mention Dumbledore's homosexuality. She claimed that Rowling, who wrote the screenplay, put Dumbledore back in "the closet". In a 2019 opinion piece in The Washington Post, Richard Morgan also expressed frustration that the headmaster is not portrayed as gay in the film. Matt Collette, the producer of the LGBT+ podcast Nancy, called Rowling a "queerbaiter", which he defined as "a writer who puts in just enough of a queer story line to appease the fans who'd like one, but not so much as to offend anyone who doesn't like gay people."

Edward Rothstein of The New York Times questioned whether Dumbledore's sexuality should be considered canon. He said that "Rowling may think of Dumbledore as gay" but "there is no reason why anyone else should". The student newspaper of East Tennessee State University accused Rowling of lying, claiming her revelation was a publicity stunt. Other critics quoted the Death of the Author principle; they claimed that Rowling's commentary about characters after the novels were published is irrelevant to an understanding of the books.

In Fantastic Beasts: The Secrets of Dumbledore (2022), Dumbledore mentions that he was in love with Grindelwald, and tells other characters about their romantic relationship. After these lines were cut from the film's Chinese release, the filmmakers faced additional criticism from fans. (Note: Attributed to multiple references:)
