= Poppy Corby-Tuech =

French-English actress

Poppy Colette Corby-Tuech (born 18 November 1986) is a British actress. She is known for portraying Prudence in the E! soap opera The Royals, and for her role as Vinda Rosier in Fantastic Beasts.

== Early life ==
Corby-Tuech was born to Michel Corby-Tuech of Veneux-les-Sablons, France, and Catherine, daughter of Lieutenant-Colonel Gillachrist Campbell, of Harleston, Norfolk, late of the Royal Artillery. Her father was of French Algerian and Alsace German origin; her mother descends from Sholto Douglas, 19th Earl of Morton, the Lords Belhaven and Stenton, and Earls of Albemarle. She grew up in Fontainebleau, but after her father's death when she was nine years old she returned to Norfolk in England with her mother. She however retains a French passport.

Corby-Tuech studied journalism at the London College of Fashion.

== Career ==
Corby-Tuech was a member of the English Post-punk/electro band White Rose Movement from 2008 until 2010.

In 2017, she acted in the music video of the song "Ready to Go" by the English synth-pop duo Hurts.

== Select filmography ==
=== Film ===
| Year | Title | Role | Notes, Refs. |
|---|---|---|---|
| 2013 | Dracula: The Dark Prince | Demetria | |
| 2016 | Una | Poppy | |
| 2018 | Fantastic Beasts: The Crimes of Grindelwald | Vinda Rosier | |
| 2022 | Fantastic Beasts: The Secrets of Dumbledore | Vinda Rosier | |

=== Television ===
| Year | Title | Role | Notes, Refs. |
|---|---|---|---|
| 2014 | Silent Witness | Eva Liron | Two episodes. |
| 2015 | Father Brown | Caterina Beresford | Episode: "The Curse of Amenhotep". |
| 2015 | This Is England '90 | Juliette | Episode: "Winter". |
| 2015–2016 | The Royals | Prudence | Recurring role, seasons 1–2, 11 episodes. |
| 2016 | The Collection | Dominique | Main role. |
| 2017 | Harlots | Marie-Louise D'Aubigne | Recurring role, series 1, 8 episodes. |
| 2019 | The Rook | Sophia | Episode: "Chapter 8". |
| 2022 | The Peripheral | Mariel Raphael | Three episodes. |
| 2024 | The Count of Monte Cristo | Héloïse | Recurring role. |
