= Victoria Yeates =

English actress

- Born: Victoria Natalie Yeates; 19 April 1983 (age 41); Bournemouth, Dorset, England
- Occupation: Actress
- Spouse: Paul Housden
- Children: 1

Victoria Natalie Yeates (born 19 April 1983) is an English actress. She is best known for her role as Sister Winifred in the period drama series Call the Midwife. She also appeared in the film Fantastic Beasts: The Crimes of Grindelwald and its sequel, Fantastic Beasts: The Secrets of Dumbledore.

Yeates was born and raised in Bournemouth, Dorset, and practised ballet dancing as a child. In 2006, she earned a degree in acting at the Royal Academy of Dramatic Art (RADA). She began her career on the stage, earning critical praise for her roles in Noël Coward's Private Lives, in the Rookery Nook and in Michael McClure's The Beard. In 2017, she began touring in a production of Arthur Miller's The Crucible.

In 2014, she joined the cast of the BBC period drama Call the Midwife as Sister Winifred, a midwife who moves to Poplar, London in the early 1960s to work at Nonnatus House.

She became engaged to musician Paul Housden in 2016 in South Africa, during filming for the Call the Midwife Christmas special. They reside in London and married in June 2018.
