= House of Shadows =

- Film poster
- Directed by: Rossella de Venuto
- Screenplay by: Rossella de Venuto
- Story by: Rossella de Venuto, Francesco Piccolo
- Produced by: Maurizio Antonini
- Starring: Fiona Glascott; Pietro Ragusa; Federico Casrtelluccio; Bianca Nappi; Marcello Prayer; Ray Lovelock; Yvonne De Carlo
- Cinematography: Ciaran Tanham
- Edited by: Cecilia Zanuso
- Music by: Lance Hogan
- Production companies: Interlinea Films, Ripple World Pictures, Barter TV
- Distributed by: Interlinea Films
- Release dates: July 2013 (Galway Film Fleadh); June 5, 2014
- Running time: 85 minutes
- Countries: Italy; Ireland
- Languages: English; Italian; German

House of Shadows, titled Controra in Italy, is a supernatural thriller film written and directed by Rossella de Venuto. The film, De Venuto's directorial debut, is an Italian-Irish co-production written in English, Italian, and German. The film premiered on 10 July 2013 at the 25th Galway Film Fleadh and showed at the International Bifest in Bari and was released in Italian theaters on 5 June 2014. It stars the Irish actress Fiona Glascott, who plays Megan, an Irish artist investigating a secret hidden in the family house of her Italian husband Leo.

== Cast ==
- Fiona Glascott as Megan
- Pietro Ragusa as Leo
- Federico Castelluccio as Father Nicola de Mundo
- Bianca Nappi as Pia
- Marcello Prayer as Michele
- Salvatore Lazzaro as Monsignor Domenico
- Ray Lovelock as Father von Galen
- Yvonne De Carlo as Mrs. Howard

== Synopsis ==
Megan, a successful Irish artist, lives in Dublin with her husband Leo, an Italian architect who emigrated there several years ago. After receiving the news of the death of Leo's uncle, Monsignor Domenico, a powerful Catholic priest whose death has prompted a campaign for his beatification, the couple travels to Apulia, in southern Italy, to handle Leo's unexpected inheritance: the ancient family palace.

Leo intends to sell the house to his brother Nicola, the town priest, and return to Dublin. Megan is enchanted by the Mediterranean surroundings and the house's decadent beauty. Meanwhile, Leo reconnects with his old friends and rediscovers a world that he had almost forgotten. Left alone at home, during the hottest hours of the summer afternoon, called the controra, Megan is disturbed by mysterious presences. While trying to understand, she finds in the palace clues to an unsolved mystery linked to Leo's family. The shadows guide her to the true story of Monsignor Domenico's past. She shares what she discovers with Father von Galen, a priest sent by the Vatican to investigate Domenico as part of the beatification process. At the same time, Leo is haunted as well by the memories of a traumatic past he had blocked out of his mind.

== Production ==
De Venuto came up with the idea for the movie as a little girl. Born in Trentino in north Italy, she used to spend her summer holidays in Apulia. She was fascinated by the old stories and legends told about the controra to prevent the children from going out during that time. She states:

"Controra" is a term used in southern Italy to indicate a precise moment of the day: it is the early afternoon, the hour when the shadows of the dead appear to contact the living. For this reason, right after lunch, local people close themselves at home to rest. It is very warm, crickets sing and streets are desert. After having experienced this and having heard the scary stories by locals, I wanted to learn more and I found that there was an extensive literature about these believes. These start already in the Greek mythology, and are maintained alive in the existing popular culture and have been well investigated by contemporary researchers such as Roger Caillois with his illuminating book Les Démon de Midi".

De Venuto was influenced by Italian horror movies from the 1970s and the 1980s such as Pupi Avati's The House with Laughing Windows, as well as Roman Polanski's Rosemary's Baby, Peter Weir's Picnic at Hanging Rock, Alejandro Amenabar's The Others, and Hideo Nakata's Ring. The movie combines a Gothic Mediterranean setting and local myths with themes like the strict code of silence of the typical Italian family of the 1940s and of the Catholic church, and subverts genre expectations by setting a horror story.

De Venuto worked on several drafts of the script over the years before teaming up with Italian author Francesco Piccolo to craft the final version. The Italian production company Interlinea Films produced the film with the Ireland's Ripple World Pictures and Italy's Barter TV. Filming in Dublin, Apulia, and South Tyrol (in Missiano, Brixen, Bolzano and Ritten) for six weeks and completed in July 2013. De Venuto partnered with Irish director of photography Ciaran Tanham for the shooting and most of the crew members were Irish as well. The movie was supported by the Irish Film Board, the Apulia Film Commission, the Business Location Südtirol Film Fund, the Regione Lazio Film Fund, Italy's Ministry of Cultural Heritage and Activities, the National Film Fund, and the Italian tax credit provided by law 24/12/2007 n. 244.

== Music ==
Irish composer Lance Hogan wrote the soundtrack. The main theme, "Annì’s Lullaby", which he wrote with Dave Kenny, is sung by Irish vocalist Anna Jordan, daughter of the famous director Neil Jordan. It was inspired by "Ninna nanna di Carpino", a traditional song from Carpino, an Italian town close to Foggia.

== Reception ==
Critical reception of House of Shadows has been generally positive. Matt Micucci from Film Ireland praised the movie writing: "...taking into consideration the fact that this is De Venuto’s feature length debut, House of Shadows is quite impressive and it certainly offers fresh and intelligent ideas to a genre that often feels repetitious and lacking in creativity."

Italian press reviews were positive as well:

"…instinctively you feel like you want to applaude in mid-scene to “Controra” and to the young director De Venuto, really brave of her to choose such a well done, disturbing and exciting supernatural thriller for her debut. In an era of so-called authors, drown in their own contemptuous self-referential idea of cinema, De Venuto, the “Trentina” with Apulian origins, takes her inspiration from the glorious directors of our seventies genre cinema..." (Valerio Capra, Il Mattino)

"It is three times curious to watch and recommend a movie like Controra: an Irish-Italy co-production (first curiosity), a movie directed by a female film-maker at her debut (second curiosity), a pure horror genre movie with all the effective frights put at the right time and place (third curiosity).The film-making makes the statues and the corners of the streets frightful and the newcomer Rossella De Venuto masters it very well; the Scottish Fiona Glascott is casting’s best choice; Ray Lovelock, the “beautiful” of the Italian detective-stories, is a living quote." (Alberto Crespi, l’Unità)

"Controra, written by De Venuto and Francesco Piccolo, is enlightened with grace and talent by the Zenith light, which strikes from the open sky and either showers terraces, rooftops, gardens, improvised soccer playgrounds, or silently penetrates dark rooms among tall, precious and frescoed ceilings, antique relics and heavy curtains. A “presence” that animates places and brings fears to the light..." (Tiziana Lo Porto, Il Venerdì)

House of Shadows has been presented at the following film festivals:

- Rome International Film Festival 2013 - Special Event
- 28° Bozner Filmtage – Bolzano Cinema 2014
- Bari International Film Fest 2014 - international panorama
- Neuchatel International Fantastic Film Festival 2014 nominated for Best film - Narcisse award
- Ortigia Film Festival 2014, Won - Best Independent Film
- Italian Horror Fest, Nettuno 2014, Won - Best Italian Horror Film
- Flaiano Film Festival 2014
