= Dolores Umbridge =

Character from Harry Potter

- Harry Potter character
- Imelda Staunton as Dolores Umbridge in Harry Potter and the Order of the Phoenix (2007)
- First appearance: Harry Potter and the Order of the Phoenix (2003)
- Created by: J. K. Rowling
- Portrayed by: Imelda Staunton (films and Harry Potter and the Battle at the Ministry); Keira Knightley (audio series)

In-universe information
- Full name: Dolores Jane Umbridge
- Occupation: Professor; Headmistress of Hogwarts; High Inquisitor at Hogwarts
- Nationality: British
- House: Slytherin

Dolores Jane Umbridge is a fictional character from the Harry Potter series created by J. K. Rowling. Umbridge is the main antagonist of the fifth novel, Harry Potter and the Order of the Phoenix, where she has been stationed at Hogwarts by the Ministry of Magic to take power away from Albus Dumbledore. She returns in a smaller capacity in the sixth novel, Harry Potter and the Half-Blood Prince and the seventh and final novel, Harry Potter and the Deathly Hallows, where she oversees the Muggle Born Registration Commission.

During her time at Hogwarts, Umbridge grows in power and is appointed High Inquisitor by the Minister for Magic in an attempt to control the school. Despite being assigned as the Defence Against the Dark Arts teacher, Umbridge refuses to teach anything practical in the subject, which leads to the formation of Dumbledore's Army as a way for the students to learn how to defend themselves. Umbridge is physically described in the narrative as a fat, toad-like woman with a wide slack mouth, a large black bow that is often in her mousy brown hair and a high-pitched voice.

Critics have recognised Umbridge as one of the most hated, as well as the most compelling, villains in the series. Umbridge was portrayed by Imelda Staunton in Harry Potter and the Order of the Phoenix and Harry Potter and the Deathly Hallows – Part 1, and in 2026 by Keira Knightley in the Audible dramatised recordings of the fifth and seventh novels.

== Fictional character biography ==
Dolores Jane Umbridge was born to a Wizard father and a Muggle mother, and eventually had a younger brother who was a Squib. Under the influence of her father, Umbridge grew up despising her mother and brother for their lack of magical abilities. She was sorted into Slytherin House at Hogwarts School of Witchcraft and Wizardry and hated her time at the school due to never being given any positions of power.

After her time at Hogwarts, Umbridge rose to prominent and influential positions in the Ministry of Magic in the Improper Use of Magic Office. After a while, Umbridge became the Senior Undersecretary to the Minister for Magic Cornelius Fudge. Umbridge used this position of power to satisfy her hatred of part-humans, for example through new Anti-Werewolf Legislation which made it nearly impossible for Remus Lupin to find a new job after resigning his post as Defence Against the Dark Arts Professor at Hogwarts in 1994.

After rumours of Voldemort's return and the increased paranoia of Cornelius Fudge, Umbridge set two dementors on Harry Potter and his cousin Dudley Dursley in Little Whinging in an attempt to get him expelled from Hogwarts for use of magic outside of school. During Harry's trial, Umbridge tried to intimidate him to undermine his defence: that he had used the Patronus Charm only because the dementors were about to permanently incapacitate him and Dudley. In the end, Umbridge, Fudge and a few other members of the court voted for conviction, but Harry was cleared of the charges.

=== Reign over Hogwarts ===
After the trial, the Ministry of Magic appointed Umbridge as the new Defence Against the Dark Arts teacher at Hogwarts to allow the Ministry to monitor the activities within Hogwarts, and particularly the Headmaster Albus Dumbledore. Fudge had an irrational belief that Dumbledore was attempting to overthrow his position as Minister and was using the students to do so. As a result, Umbridge refused to teach any sort of martial magic and saw her return to the school as an opportunity to gain power over the people who had refused to give her any positions of responsibility during her schooling.

Umbridge made a negative impression on the students of Hogwarts at the Start-of-Term Feast, where she interrupted Dumbledore and talked to the students in a condescending manner. She began interfering with the students' learning at Hogwarts by refusing to teach any practical applications despite her post as Defence Against the Dark Arts professor. Due to the apparent return of Voldemort that was being silenced by the Ministry, students such as Harry, Ron Weasley, Hermione Granger and Dean Thomas began openly opposing Umbridge's insistence on theoretical applications. Harry's constant objections in Umbridge's class due to his being present at Voldemort's return and witnessing the murder of Cedric Diggory led him to a detention with Umbridge. She forced him to write "I must not tell lies" with a cursed quill that scarred the phrase into his hand permanently.

Umbridge was appointed as Hogwarts "High Inquisitor" by the Ministry to evaluate, harass or fire any teacher deemed unsatisfactory by her. This found her often at odds with Transfiguration professor and Head of Gryffindor House Minerva McGonagall. She further made notices in accord with Ministry Educational Decrees that prevented teachers from talking to students about anything but their subject, and gave the Hogwarts High Inquisitor additional powers. Umbridge abolished all student groups, which included the House Quidditch teams. Eventually Harry, Ron and Hermione formed Dumbledore's Army as a way to teach students how to use defensive spells in a practical format. The group was a secret organisation that would meet in the Room of Requirement, a hidden room in Hogwarts.

After Harry gave an interview with The Quibbler where he discussed Voldemort's return, Umbridge banned the magazine from Hogwarts. She also restricted Harry's privileges. Unbeknownst to Umbridge, banning the magazine triggered a Streisand effect of encouraging most people in Hogwarts to read the interview, which they hid from her via a variety of spells to transfigure the magazine into harmless schoolbooks if she questioned them, leading more individuals to begin opposing her presence in the castle.

Umbridge sacked Divination Professor Sybill Trelawney, but was unsuccessful in evicting her from the castle due to Dumbledore's intervention. Dumbledore then purposely appointed centaur Firenze as the new Divination Professor, being aware of Umbridge's contempt for non-human magical beings.

Dumbledore's Army was eventually betrayed by Ravenclaw student Marietta Edgecombe. She was threatened by Umbridge that if she didn't turn them over, her mother would lose her job at the Ministry. Umbridge attempted to have Harry expelled from Hogwarts, but Dumbledore took the blame for the group's formation and disappeared from Hogwarts to avoid arrest.

Umbridge was appointed as the new Headmistress of Hogwarts by Fudge. She then formed the Inquisitorial Squad, composed entirely of Slytherin students such as Draco Malfoy. Despite Dumbledore's Army being banned, the rebellion against Umbridge continued, mainly expressed by the ongoing pranks of Fred and George Weasley. Before Umbridge could catch the twins, they fled Hogwarts on their broomsticks after encouraging the castle's poltergeist Peeves to continue tormenting Umbridge in their absence. The castle itself seemed to recognise that Umbridge was not the true Headmistress, as it denied her access to the Headmaster's Office.

After Umbridge sacked Care of Magical Creatures professor Rubeus Hagrid due to his half-breed status, Professor McGonagall attempted to intervene, which resulted in Umbridge and a squad of aurors attacking her so severely she was hospitalised at St. Mungo's. She also intercepted all manner of communications to prevent Harry from contacting his godfather Sirius Black and the Order of the Phoenix, even going so far as to injure Harry's pet owl Hedwig.

She eventually caught Harry attempting to use the Floo Network in her office to contact Sirius. This resulted in Dumbledore's Army members Harry, Ron, Hermione, Neville Longbottom, Ginny Weasley and Luna Lovegood being rounded up by the Inquisitorial Squad and held in her office. When Harry refused to give Umbridge any information, she called Potions Master Severus Snape to provide her with the truth-telling potion Veritaserum, but Snape informed her that she had squandered his entire stock interrogating students. Umbridge then believed that the illegal Cruciatus Curse would cause Harry to loosen his tongue. Hermione attempted to protest, but Umbridge brushed her off and revealed that she had ordered the dementor attack on Harry and Dudley during the summer.

Hermione tricked Umbridge into following Harry and herself into the Forbidden Forest to search for Dumbledore's alleged "secret weapon". Umbridge was confronted by a herd of centaurs, whom she insulted with racial slurs. She then attacked a centaur. As a result, Umbridge was carried off and nearly killed by the herd. She was saved by Dumbledore, who managed to calm the herd due to their respect for him and brought her out without a scratch but in a severe state of shock.

After Voldemort was sighted in the Ministry of Magic by numerous people including Fudge, Dumbledore was reinstated as Headmaster at Hogwarts, and Umbridge was sacked. She attempted to sneak out of the school but encountered Peeves, who chased her out of the school with McGonagall's cane to the delight of students and teachers alike.

=== Return to the Ministry of Magic ===
After her dismissal from Hogwarts, Umbridge returned to the Ministry as the Senior Undersecretary to the new Minister, Rufus Scrimgeour. She purposely chose to continue to torment Harry by informing the Minister of Harry's wish to become an auror. Harry refused to trust Scrimgeour or the Ministry of Magic due to the fact that Umbridge was never sacked or arrested for her actions.

Umbridge was later seen at Dumbledore's funeral, attempting to look appropriately somber. She was startled by the appearance of Firenze, clearly having been traumatised by her encounter with the centaurs.

After Voldemort's takeover of the Ministry of Magic, Umbridge oversaw the registration and persecution of Muggle-born witches and wizards, sometimes referred to as mudbloods, under the Muggle-Born Registration Commission. In her position, Umbridge conducted biased trials that subjected Muggle-born witches and wizards to dementors and have them sent to Azkaban prison for "stealing magic from real witches and wizards". Following Alastor Moody's murder, Umbridge somehow obtained possession of his magical prosthetic eye and had it affixed into the door to her office as a way of terrorising Ministry employees and reminding them she was observing them at all times.

At some point, Umbridge received a locket as a bribe from thief Mundungus Fletcher. The pendant was actually Salazar Slytherin's locket and was, unbeknownst to her, one of Voldemort's Horcruxes. Due to Umbridge's twisted nature, the Horcrux actually amplified her magical abilities.

During one of her kangaroo court trials, she accused Mary Cattermole of having stolen her wand and alleged she was not a true witch. Harry appeared from under his Cloak of Invisibility and attacked Umbridge, allowing Harry and Hermione to take Slytherin's locket from her in order to destroy the Horcrux. Hermione duplicated the locket and left the fake with Umbridge to allay suspicion.

After Voldemort's defeat by Harry at the Battle of Hogwarts and the restoration of the Ministry of Magic by the new Minister, Kingsley Shacklebolt, Umbridge was sentenced to life imprisonment in Azkaban for her crimes against Muggle-borns.

== Characterisation ==
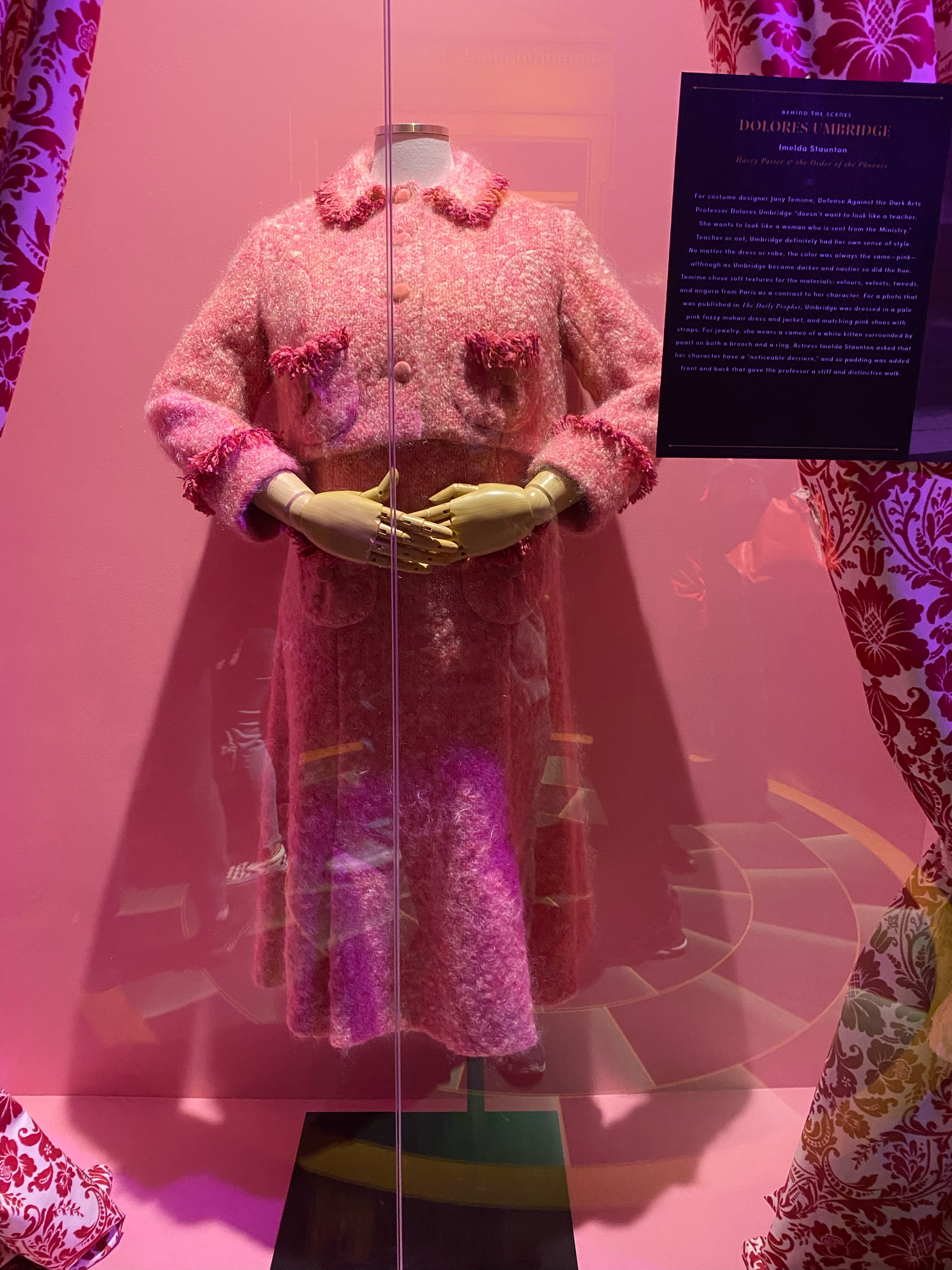
A costume designed by Jany Temime and worn by Imelda Staunton while playing Dolores Umbridge.

Umbridge is depicted in the novels as being an evil, cruel, authoritarian, power-hungry, bigoted and despicable woman who represented the worst of political power, under a saccharine image filled with kittens, fluff, and girlishness. She is sadistic and overwhelmingly corrupt, to the point of finding joy in torturing students. Harry describes Umbridge to Sirius Black, saying that she's vile enough to be a Death Eater, despite not being one.

Umbridge is also depicted to be a prejudiced person, despising half-breeds and Muggle-born witches and wizards to the point of firing Hagrid due to his half-giant birth status. She displayed her intolerance to the centaur Firenze, shouting racial insults towards the herd of centaurs that confronted her in the Forbidden Forest. Umbridge was a "pure-blood supremacist" and attempted to mask her half-blood status, often lambasting her Muggle mother and Squib younger brother.

As to her full name, Rowling has written, "Umbridge's names were carefully chosen. 'Dolores' means sorrow, something she undoubtedly inflicts on all around her. 'Umbridge' is a play on 'umbrage' from the British expression 'to take umbrage', meaning offence. Dolores is offended by any challenge to her limited worldview; I felt her surname conveyed the pettiness and rigidity of her character. It is harder to explain 'Jane'; it simply felt rather smug and neat between her other two names." An article from Dictionary.com observes that the Latin (and Spanish) word dolor can mean both "sorrow" or "pain", while the aforementioned umbrage ("offense" or "annoyance") comes from the Latin umbra ("shade" or "shadow").

== Reception and impact ==
Umbridge has been described as one of the most hated fictional characters. (Note: Attributed to multiple references:) Charlotte Ahlin of Bustle said that Umbridge's nastiness "got under every reader's skin." The entertainment website IGN called her a hideous and nasty character who applies "despicable" punishments. In a review of the Order of the Phoenix novel, author Stephen King called Umbridge one of the best antagonists he had ever read, and the greatest fictional villain since Hannibal Lecter. Imelda Staunton received widespread acclaim for her performance as Umbridge in the Harry Potter films. Lisa Schwarzbaum of Entertainment Weekly called her "showstopping".

=== Real-life comparisons and inspiration ===
Occasionally, real-life public figures have been compared to Umbridge in a negative light due to their actions. Rival US Presidential candidates Donald Trump and Hillary Clinton were both compared to Umbridge during the 2016 United States presidential election. Former Prime Minister of the United Kingdom Margaret Thatcher was an influence on the way the character was portrayed in the film adaptations, according to director David Yates and actress Imelda Staunton. Rowling has stated that Umbridge is in fact based on a teacher of hers and was not inspired by Thatcher.
