= Fiona Glascott =

Irish actress (born 1982)

- Born: 22 November 1982 (age 43); Waterford, Ireland
- Occupation: Actress
- Years active: 1995–present
- Known for: Young Minerva McGonagall in Fantastic Beasts
- Spouse: Tom Brooke (m. 2014)
- Children: 1
- Relatives: Paul Brooke (father-in-law)

Fiona Glascott (born 22 November 1982) is an Irish actress. She is best known for playing the young Minerva McGonagall in the Fantastic Beasts franchise, which is a spin-off prequel of the Harry Potter film series.

== Early life ==
Glascott was born in Waterford, Ireland and grew up in Carrick-on-Suir, County Tipperary.

== Career ==
=== Theatre ===
On stage in London she has appeared in Mahler's Conversion (Aldwych Theatre, West End), Hitchcock Blonde (Royal Court and Lyric Theatre, West End), in the original production of Whipping It Up at the Bush Theatre, and as Margery Pinchwife in The Country Wife (Haymarket, West End). Her theatre credits in Dublin include: A Life (Abbey Theatre/National Tour), The Spirit of Annie Ross at the Gate Theatre, and as Nina in The Seagull at the Corn Exchange.

=== Television ===
Her television credits include Ballykissangel, Fair City, The Bill, Bachelors Walk, Foyle's War and Clone. In 2010, she was a guest star in the final two-part episode of ITV's hit drama A Touch of Frost, playing the troubled daughter of Frost's one-time corrupt colleague. In 2011, Glascott appeared in the recurring role of Diane on the BBC/Showtime sitcom Episodes. That same year, she appeared as a novice nun with a secret in the episode "A Sacred Trust" of the detective drama series Midsomer Murders. She co-starred as famed editor Judith Jones on the TV series Julia.

=== Film ===
On film, Glascott has appeared in This Is My Father, Crush Proof, Goldfish Memory, Omagh, The Duel and Brooklyn. She appeared in the 2009 CBS television movie Miss Irena's Children. She also starred in Torstein Blixfjord's 2012 short film Bird in a Box, alongside Brian d'Arcy James.

In 2018, Glascott joined the cast of the Harry Potter spin-off franchise Fantastic Beasts as a young Minerva McGonagall (a role originated by Maggie Smith) in the film Fantastic Beasts: The Crimes of Grindelwald, a role she would reprise in the 2022 sequel Fantastic Beasts: The Secrets of Dumbledore. Her role in the film series was controversial for some fans of the series, as her character had not been believed to have been born yet and was shown in the film teaching at Hogwarts.

== Personal life ==
In 2014, Glascott married actor Tom Brooke, the son of actor Paul Brooke. They have one daughter.

== Filmography ==
Year	Title	Role	Notes
1995	Finbar's Class		
1998	This Is My Father	Nuala	
1998	Crush Proof	Aisling	
1998	Pete's Meteor	Mary	
1998	Ballykissangel	Marie	TV series
1998–1999	Fair City		TV series
2000	Fatboy and Twintub		Short film
2002	The Bill	Lucy Corrigan	TV series
2002	Any Time Now	Angie	TV series
2002	The Magnificent Ambersons	Lucy's Friend #1	TV movie
2002	Resident Evil	Ms. Gold	
2003	Goldfish Memory	Isolde	
2003	Veronica Guerin	Meehan's Girlfriend	
2003	Bachelors Walk	Rachel	TV series special
2004	Judas	Claudia Procles	TV movie
2004	Fallen	Clare Woodward	TV movie
2004	Omagh	Cathy Gallagher	TV movie
2004	The Long Firm	Janine	TV mini-series
2005	Within	Christina	
2005	Murder in Suburbia	Nuala Goodman	TV series
2005	Jericho	Mary	TV mini-series
2005	Agatha Christie's Poirot	Rosamund	Episode: "After the Funeral"
2005	Casualty	Tara Doyle	TV series
2005	Casualty@Holby City	Tara Doyle	TV series
2007	Instinct	D.C. Ali Peters	TV movie
2008	Foyle's War	Jane Hudson	Episode: "Plan of Attack"
2008	The Deal	Glascott Hicks	
2008	Clone	Rose Bourne	TV series
2010	The Duel	Nadia	
2010	Spooks	Danielle Ortiz	TV series
2010	A Touch of Frost	Jenny Mallinger	TV series
2011–2017	Episodes	Diane	TV series
2011	Apartment 143 (Emergo)	Ellen Keegan	
2011	Midsomer Murders	Sister Catherine	Episode: "A Sacred Trust"
2011	Death in Paradise	Georgie Westcott	TV series
2012	Tad, The Lost Explorer	Sara Lavrof	Voice role
2012	Bird in a Box	Alice	Short film
2013	House of Shadows (Controra)	Megan	
2014	The Musketeers	Flea	Episode: "The Homecoming"
2014	The Legend of Longwood	Caitlin Lemon	
2015	Brooklyn	Rose Lacey	
2015–2016	Indian Summers	Sarah Raworth / Sarah	TV series
2016	Siege of Jadotville	Carmel Quinlan	
2017	Secret Child	Cathleen	
2018	Fantastic Beasts: The Crimes of Grindelwald	Minerva McGonagall	
2018	Midday Demons	Megan	
2019	Supervized	Alicia	
2022	Fantastic Beasts: The Secrets of Dumbledore	Minerva McGonagall	
2022–2023	Julia	Judith Jones	
2025	Sherlock & Daughter	Lady Violet Somerset	TV series, main cast
2023	The Martini Shot	Mary	World premiere at Galway Film Fleadh; Best Female Performance at Gasparilla International Film Festival

== Awards ==
In 2003, Glascott was nominated for the Irish Film and Television Award for Best Supporting Actress in Film/TV for the film Goldfish Memory.
