= Oyate =

2022 film directed by Emil Benjamin and Brandon Jackson

- Theatrical Poster
- Directed by: Brandon Jackson; Emil Benjamin
- Produced by: Brandon Jackson; Emil Benjamin; Sandra Evers-Manly; Jennifer Martel
- Cinematography: Emil Benjamin
- Edited by: Emil Benjamin
- Music by: Jerod Impichaachaaha’ Tate; Alexander Morgan
- Release date: February 24, 2022 (Big Sky Documentary Film Festival)
- Running time: 91 minutes
- Country: United States
- Languages: English; Lakota

Oyate is a 2022 American documentary film directed by Brandon Jackson and Emil Benjamin. The film follows Indigenous activists and politicians as they shed light on the Dakota Access Pipeline protests. Oyate had its world premiere at Big Sky Documentary Film Festival in 2022 and has been screened at multiple other festivals across the United States.

== Synopsis ==
The Dakota Access Pipeline protests became an inflection point for Indigenous people and modern tribal sovereignty. Thousands of people from across the county gathered at the Standing Rock reservation to stand in solidarity with the Lakota people. Since then, community leaders have been used their newfound platform to organize and educate people about their issues. Oyate uses the #NoDAPL struggle as a jumping off point to dive into an array of issues that affect Indigenous people. The film centers around a diverse group of Indigenous voices led by activist Phyllis Young, attorney Chase Iron Eyes, hip hop artist Stuart James, and Secretary of the Interior Deb Haaland as they unravel a history of systemic oppression defined by broken treaties, land theft, and cultural erasure. The latter half of the story follows the subjects on the ground as they take the fight to state governments, Washington DC, and eventually the United Nations.

== Cast ==
- Chase Iron Eyes
- Phyllis Young
- Deb Haaland
- Stuart James
- Tokata Iron Eyes
- Sally Jewell
- Ruth Buffalo
- LaDonna Brave Bull Allard
- Andrea Carmen
- Tamara St. John

== Release ==
The film premiered at the 2022 Big Sky Documentary Film Festival, and screened at the 2022 Cleveland International Film Festival.

== Critical reception ==
Oyate received positive critical reception. It holds a 100% "Fresh" rating on Rotten Tomatoes based on five reviews. Reviewing for Film Threat, Rob Rector stated, "Any spotlight brought to the systemic mistreatment and marginalization of this America’s original inhabitants is worthy of attention." In a review for The Independent Critic, Richard Propes wrote, "Oyate is a vital and necessary documentary about a subject many Americans have only learned about in bits and pieces and a subject that, you guessed it, has most certainly been whitewashed." Additionally the film has been noted for elevating indigenous issues.

== Awards ==
Awards and nominations
Ceremony	Award	Category	Nominee	Result
Cleveland International Film Festival	Local Heroes	Emil Benjamin and Brandon Jackson	Nominated	
North Dakota Environmental Rights Film Festival	Audience Choice Award		Won	
North Dakota Environmental Rights Film Festival	Jury Award		Won	
Albuquerque Film & Music Experience	Best Native/Indigenous Films	1st Runner Up	Emil Benjamin and Brandon Jackson	Nominated
Albuquerque Film & Music Experience	Best Director - Documentary Feature	Emil Benjamin and Brandon Jackson	Won	
