= Afterschool =

- Theatrical release poster
- Directed by: Antonio Campos
- Written by: Antonio Campos
- Produced by: Sean Durkin; Josh Mond
- Starring: Ezra Miller; Addison Timlin; Jeremy Allen White; Michael Stuhlbarg
- Cinematography: Jody Lee Lipes
- Edited by: Antonio Campos
- Music by: Gael Rakotondrabe
- Production company: BorderLine Films
- Distributed by: IFC Films
- Release dates: May 18, 2008 (Cannes); October 2, 2009
- Running time: 107 minutes
- Country: United States
- Language: English

Afterschool is a 2008 American psychological drama film written and directed by Antonio Campos and stars Ezra Miller in their film debut. Filmed at the Pomfret School in Pomfret, Connecticut, Afterschool premiered at the 2008 Cannes Film Festival in the program Un Certain Regard. The film gained an Independent Spirit Award and Gotham Award nomination for Campos and won the Jury Prize for experimental narrative film at the Nashville Film Festival.

== Plot ==
While doing a film project at a private school, Internet video-obsessed teenager Robert catches twin sisters dying due to drugs contaminated with rat poison. Confused, Robert does not call for help but rather simply walks over to the girls and sits on the floor with them, pulling one into his lap as she dies. This scene, caught on Robert's camera and by another student on a cell phone, is repeatedly shown, but always from the same angle: with Robert's back to the viewer. The viewer cannot see her death but only hear her cries slowly subside. This is all caught on a video camera Robert was using for a school project. After the deaths, an atmosphere of paranoia and unease sets in among students and teachers, Robert being affected as well. The school claims that the drugs were bought outside the school and enforces a new, much harsher, drug policy wherein bags are searched and students are expelled. Robert and another student, Amy, are assigned to make a memorial video. The school is not happy with the result and has it re-edited, to make a smoother version.

While making the video, Robert and Amy begin a romantic relationship, wherein they both have sex for the first time in a wooded area. However, it is later hinted that Robert’s roommate may be involved romantically with Amy, as well. He fights with his roommate, who sold the drugs to the twins, and shouts that he killed the girls. The school questions him about this accusation, and is relieved that Robert says it was not substantiated. Robert is asked to take a leave of absence from the school. Toward the end of the film, we are finally shown the scene of the girls' deaths from the front and see Robert pressing his hand over her mouth and nose, smothering her. Later, Robert is shown at the school nurse, taking a daily dose of pills, showing that Robert is now on medication. The film ends as an unseen person with a cell phone videos him while he looks at two pictures of the deceased twins.

== Cast ==
- Ezra Miller as Robert
- Addison Timlin as Amy
- Jeremy Allen White as Dave
- Michael Stuhlbarg as Mr. Burke
- Emory Cohen as Trevor
- David Costabile as Mr. Anderson
- Rosemarie DeWitt as Ms. Vogel
- Dariusz Uczkowski as Peter
- Gary Wilmes as Mr. Virgil
- Lee Wilkof as Mr. Wiseman

== Reception ==
Afterschool has an 80% approval rating on review aggregate website Rotten Tomatoes, based on 44 reviews with an average rating of 6.55/10. The website's critics' consensus reads: "Antonio Campos' Afterschool is an intelligent, ambitious debut that boasts strong performances and plenty of ideas." Metacritic averaged the film at a rating of 66 based on eleven reviews from critics.

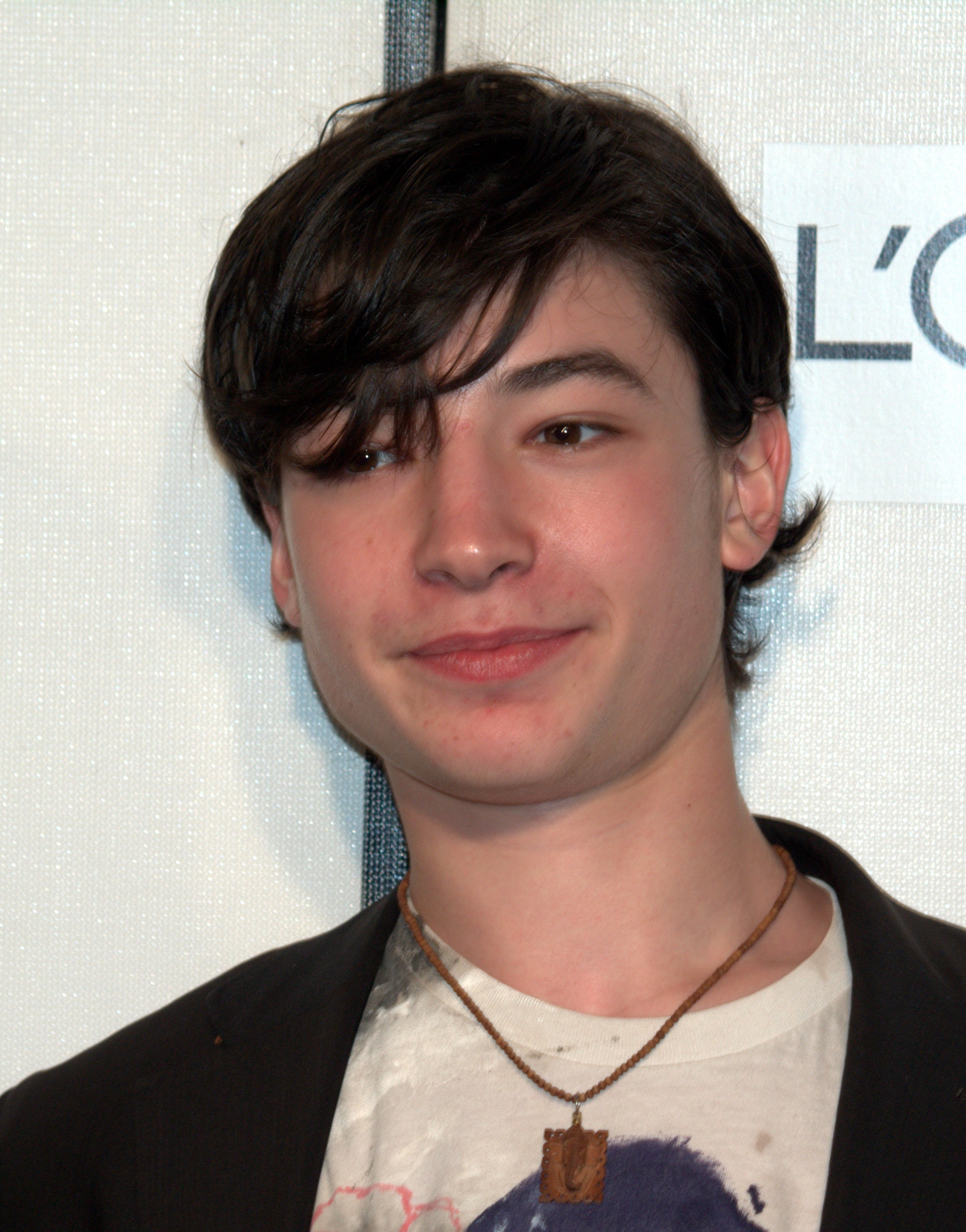
Ezra Miller makes their film debut in this movie.

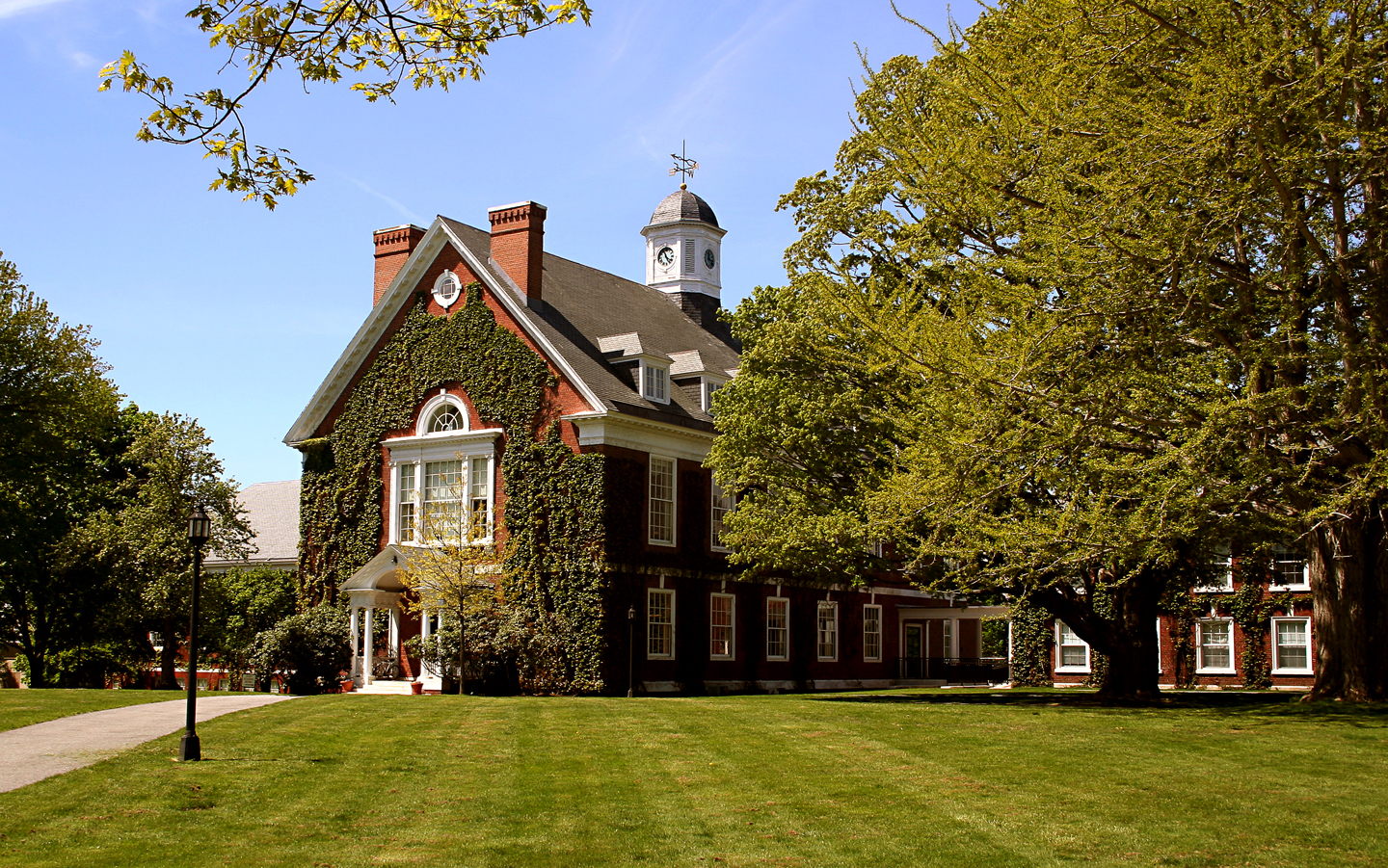
The film was shot in Pomfret, Connecticut.
