= Beware the Gonzo =

- Theatrical release poster
- Directed by: Bryan Goluboff
- Written by: Bryan Goluboff
- Produced by: Craig Cohen; Matthew Weaver; Israel Wolfson; Carly Hugo; Susan Shopmaker; Matt Parker
- Starring: Ezra Miller; Zoë Kravitz; Griffin Newman; Jesse McCartney; Judah Friedlander; James Urbaniak; Amy Sedaris; Campbell Scott
- Cinematography: Richard Rutkowski
- Edited by: Colleen Sharp
- Music by: Anthony Roman; The Mod
- Production company: Corner Store Entertainment
- Distributed by: Tribeca Film
- Release dates: April 22, 2010 (Tribeca); September 9, 2011
- Running time: 94 minutes
- Country: United States
- Language: English

Beware the Gonzo is a 2010 romantic comedy-drama film written and directed by Bryan Goluboff. Ezra Miller stars as the eponymous Gonzo, a high school student who creates an underground newspaper. Zoë Kravitz, Jesse McCartney, Griffin Newman, Campbell Scott, and Amy Sedaris appear in supporting roles. Its title refers to a style of first-person confrontational journalism developed by Hunter S. Thompson in the early 1970s.

The film debuted at the Tribeca Film Festival in April 2010.

== Plot ==
After being fired from his high school paper by editor Gavin Reilly, Eddie "Gonzo" Gilman establishes an underground paper with his friends Rob Becker, Ming Na, and Scott Schneeman to give a voice to unpopular students. Eddie's idea catches the attention of Evie Wallace, who joins the paper's team out of disdain for Gavin. The first issue causes a commotion throughout the school and Principal Roy and Gavin offer to give Eddie his own section in the main paper if he tones down his content. Eddie, however, refuses to censor his articles, even under the threat of suspension.

For the second issue, Eddie exposes the unsanitary conditions of his school's cafeteria, causing the cafeteria to be closed by the health inspector. The issue brings popularity to Eddie in the high school, which grows when Principal Roy suspends him. He and Evie also enter into a relationship. However, Gavin attempts to damage Eddie's reputation by falsely claiming Eddie staged the conditions as a favor to diner owner Errol, Eddie's first advertiser. Eddie retaliates by writing an exposé on Gavin, in which he reveals Gavin had Schneeman write a paper for him in exchange for not being bullied and humiliated an anonymous girl (Evie) with his friends after having sex with her; information Schneeman and Evie trusted him to keep confidential. After the article is released, Eddie's friends break off contact with him and he is indefinitely suspended from school, pending a likely expulsion.

At the advice of his father, Eddie creates a video apologizing for his actions and his suspension is lifted. The apology earns him back the respect of many of his classmates, although, other than Rob, his friends continue to refuse to speak with him. Nevertheless, Evie reaches out to Eddie again. The two make amends and resume their relationship.

== Cast ==
- Ezra Miller as Eddie "Gonzo" Gilman
- Zoë Kravitz as Evie Wallace
- Griffin Newman as Horny Rob Becker
- Stefanie Hong as Ming Na
- Edward Gelbinovich as Schneeman
- Jesse McCartney as Gavin Reilly
- Amy Sedaris as Diane Gilman
- Campbell Scott as Arthur Gilman
- James Urbaniak as Principal Roy
- Marc John Jefferies as Stone
- Lucian Maisel as Malloy
- Jerry Grayson as Errol
- Yul Vazquez as Charlie Ronald
- Judah Friedlander as Cafeteria guy
- Noah Fleiss as Ryan
- Matthew Shear as Dave Melnick
- Conor Leslie as Amy
- Colby Minifie as Melanie

== Reception ==
Beware the Gonzo received mixed reviews; the film has a 44% rating on Rotten Tomatoes and a 36/100 rating on Metacritic.
