= Tokata Iron Eyes =

American activist (born 2003)

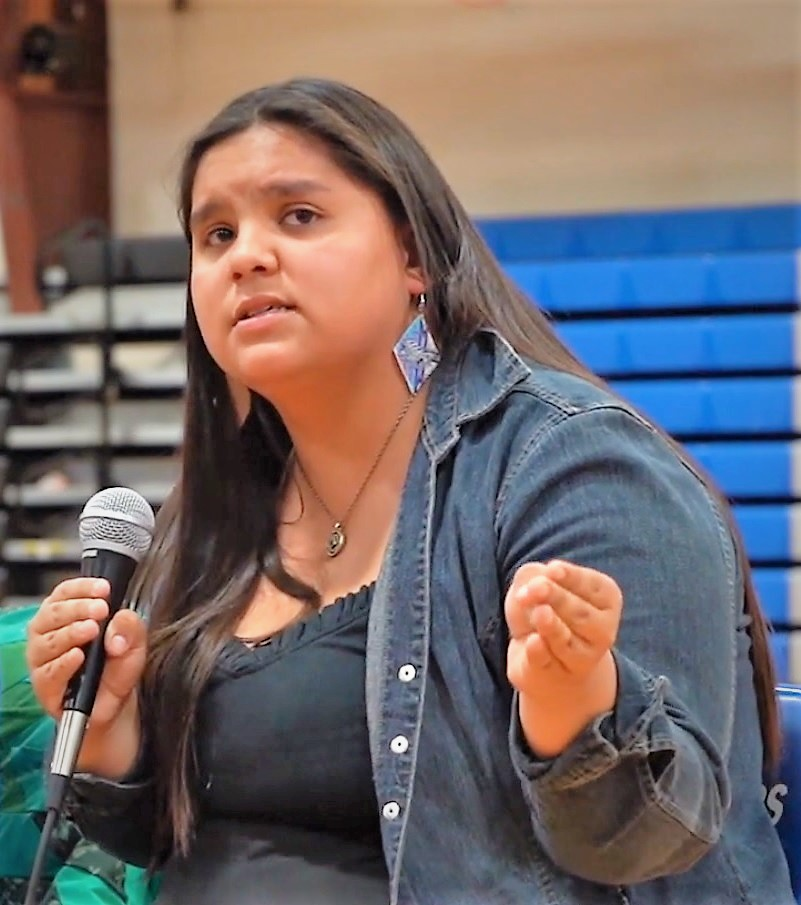
- Iron Eyes at a climate forum at the Lakota People's Law Project in 2019
- Born: August 13, 2003 (age 23)
- Citizenship: Standing Rock Sioux, American
- Education: Bard College at Simon's Rock
- Known for: Environmental activism; Relationship with Ezra Miller
- Father: Chase Iron Eyes

Tokata Iron Eyes (born August 13, 2003) is a Native American activist and member of the Standing Rock Sioux tribe. Iron Eyes was a youth leader of "ReZpect our Water", a campaign against the proposed route of the Dakota Access Pipeline, and served on the board of a sustainable energy group called Indigenized Energy. Iron Eyes is also a singer and songwriter.

== Personal life ==
Tokata Iron Eyes is the child of Chase Iron Eyes–an activist, attorney, and politician–and Sara Jumping Eagle–a pediatrician and environmental activist. Iron Eyes attended the Red Cloud Indian School on the Pine Ridge Reservation and Bard College at Simon's Rock. According to a statement made by their father in 2022, Iron Eyes is nonbinary. Iron Eyes uses she/they pronouns.

== Activism ==
Iron Eyes became involved in activism at age 9, when they testified against a uranium mine in the Black Hills. At age 12, they spoke in a viral video advocating for action against the Dakota Access Pipeline, which later sparked the social media campaign, "Rezpect Our Water." In September 2019, Iron Eyes met youth climate activist Greta Thunberg at George Washington University. Iron Eyes invited Thunberg to Iron Eyes' homelands, and the two held multiple rallies together in North Dakota and South Dakota throughout October 2019. The pair spoke at multiple locations including at Red Cloud Indian School, the Youth Climate Activism Panel in Rapid City, South Dakota, and at Standing Rock High School in Fort Yates, North Dakota. Iron Eyes also served on the board of a new sustainable energy group called Indigenized Energy.

== Relationship with Ezra Miller ==
In June 2022, Iron Eyes' parents filed legal documents asking a judge to issue an order of protection against actor Ezra Miller on her behalf, due to Miller allegedly using "violence, intimidation, threat of violence, fear, paranoia, delusions, and drugs" including marijuana and LSD to hold sway over them. Although Iron Eyes was 18, due to tribal regulations Iron Eyes' parents were still considered their legal guardians.

Iron Eyes' parents claim that an inappropriate relationship began between the pair in 2016, during the Dakota Access Pipeline protests, when Miller was 23 and Iron Eyes was 12. They further claim, and photos document, that the year after the two met, Iron Eyes flew to London to visit Miller on the set of Fantastic Beasts and Where to Find Them. In 2021, they dropped out of school, allegedly to follow Miller. Iron Eyes' parents also alleged in the legal documents that Miller caused bruises on Tokata and that Miller had given Iron Eyes a large amount of LSD in 2020. A response came via Tokata's Instagram account, denying the parents' allegations, declaring herself to be both mentally stable and in contact with a mental health professional.

Their parents countered by claiming their child does not control their social media. Iron Eyes stated in the video response that it's her own choice not to have a phone. As of June 10, 2022, law enforcement was unable to locate Miller to serve them with the order. Miller then posted messages on their Instagram account mocking the court's attempts to find them, but has since deleted them.

In August, Miller's former music collaborator Oliver Ignatius stated that he had witnessed Miller verbally abuse Iron Eyes over her wearing makeup. She defended Miller by referring to the incident as "a catty comment" and a part of "queer dialogue"; she called the allegation of abuse "homophobic".

According to a September 2022 Vanity Fair article, the tribal court dismissed the request for a permanent protective order, and the parents say they withdrew their request for custody, believing the odds were stacked against them; the same article reports that Miller claimed to be Jesus, the devil, and the next messiah, while Iron Eyes believed herself to be a "Native American spider goddess". The article also claimed that Miller and Iron Eyes believe their relationship will bring about a Native American revolution followed by the apocalypse.

== Awards and recognition ==
In January 2020, Iron Eyes was featured on Disney+ in an episode of Marvel's Hero Project as "Thrilling Tokata". In May 2020, they were named one of the Ms. Foundation's 2020 Women of Vision, and she received the Peggy C. Charren Free to Be You and Me Award.
