= Mimi Choi =

Canadian makeup artist (born 1985)

- Born: 1985 (age 40–41); Macau
- Occupations: Teacher; Makeup artist
- Organization: Founder of Mimi Choi Makeup Artistry

Mimi Choi is a Macau-born Canadian makeup artist who is the founder and head of her own makeup company, Mimi Choi Makeup Artistry. She is best known for her styles of makeup that involve optical illusions and creative, surreal imagery, and became known for doing the makeup for Ezra Miller's 2019 Met Gala look. Prior to being a makeup artist, she worked as a Montessori teacher.

== Biography ==
Choi was born in Macau but immigrated to Vancouver at a young age with her family. From a young age, she began doing her own makeup. Eventually, friends and family asked her to do their bridal and beauty makeup. She went into work as a Montessori preschool teacher, but was still passionate about makeup, and ultimately left her job to enroll in a makeup school in Vancouver, which is near where she lives.She taught mathematics and craft at a Montessori preschool while doing bridal makeup at weekends, and at 28 she left the job to enrol in makeup school in Vancouver. She soon began doing illusion-focused looks, starting with a cracked face.

She is known for her hyperreal optical illusions, including designs with extra eyes and lips on her face and designs that transform parts of her body into food, such as cake, ramen, a hamburger, and others, as well as other surreal makeup designs. Signature makeup designs she has created include a "faceless look" hiding her facial features in a hollow void, multiple eyes, and a shifted face.

Some inspirations she has cited include food and her sleep paralysis. Many of her looks have also been based on art, especially the work of Salvador Dalí.

She gained attention after doing the makeup for Ezra Miller in their 2019 Met Gala look, featuring seven eyes. This makeup took five hours to complete. She has also collaborated with UNICEF, Make Up For Ever, MAC Cosmetics, Food Network, and others, and has taught makeup.

She is also noted for her Instagram content creation, where she has frequently gone viral. As of 2019, she had 1.1 million followers. In 2025, she was one of the inaugural recipients of the Instagram Rings award.
