= Make Up For Ever =

French cosmetics brand

- Type: Division of holding company (LVMH)
- Industry: Consumer goods
- Founded: 1984
- Founder: Dany Sanz
- Headquarters: Paris, France
- Products: Cosmetics and beauty
- Parent: LVMH Moët Hennessy • Louis Vuitton S.A.
- Website: www.makeupforever.com

Make Up For Ever is a French cosmetics brand owned by LVMH. It was created in 1984 by make-up artist Dany Sanz.

== History ==
Make Up For Ever was founded in 1984 by make-up artist Dany Sanz. It provides cosmetics to many people, including professional make-up artists. LVMH acquired the brand in 1999 to expand its make-up services and developed the services to appeal to its customer base.

In 2004, Nicolas Cordier was named CEO and formed a manager/creator team with Sanz. The subsequent CEOs included Rachel Marouani (2017-2020), Gabrielle Rodriguez (2020-2023), and Charles-Henri Levaillant (2023-2024). As of 2024, the current CEO is Aline Burelier.

In 2002, Make Up For Ever Academy started in Paris, and has since expanded to New York, Shanghai, Hong Kong, Seoul, Singapore, Brussels, Helsinki and Nice.

Make Up For Ever has collaborated with people including Mimi Choi.
