= Treading Water (2013 film) =

- Poster
- Directed by: Analeine Cal y Mayor
- Written by: Alaleine Cal y Mayor; Javier Gullón
- Produced by: Niv Fichman; Stacy Perskie
- Starring: Douglas Smith; Zoë Kravitz
- Cinematography: Gregory Middleton
- Edited by: Óscar Figueroa
- Music by: Benoît Charest
- Production companies: Rhombus Media; Redrum; Mecanismo Films; Telefilm Canada
- Distributed by: The Orchard; Alliance Films
- Release date: March 2013 (Miami)
- Running time: 86 minutes 92 minutes
- Countries: Canada; Mexico
- Language: English

Treading Water (also titled The Boy Who Smells Like Fish) is a 2013 Mexican-Canadian comedy-drama film directed by Analeine Cal y Mayor and starring Douglas Smith and Zoë Kravitz. It is Cal y Mayor's feature directorial debut.

== Cast ==
- Douglas Smith as Mica
- Zoe Kravitz as Laura
- Carrie-Anne Moss as Catherine
- Ariadna Gil as Sophie
- Gonzalo Vega as Guillermo Garibai
- Don McKellar as Richard

== Release ==
The film premiered at the Miami International Film Festival in March 2013.

== Reception ==
The film has a rating of 40% on Rotten Tomatoes based on 10 reviews.

Nick Schager of Variety gave the film a negative review and wrote, "Emitting the unpleasant stench of over-affectation, Treading Water slaps together its particular peculiarities with such randomness, it’s as if the film were conceived from blindly throwing disparate elements at the wall."

Sheila O'Malley of RogerEbert.com awarded the film two and a half stars.

Mark Adams of Screen Daily gave the film a positive review, calling it "a gentle charmer punctuated with a series of nicely judged performance and an increasing sense of magical realism."
