= Chase Iron Eyes =

American lawyer (born 1978)

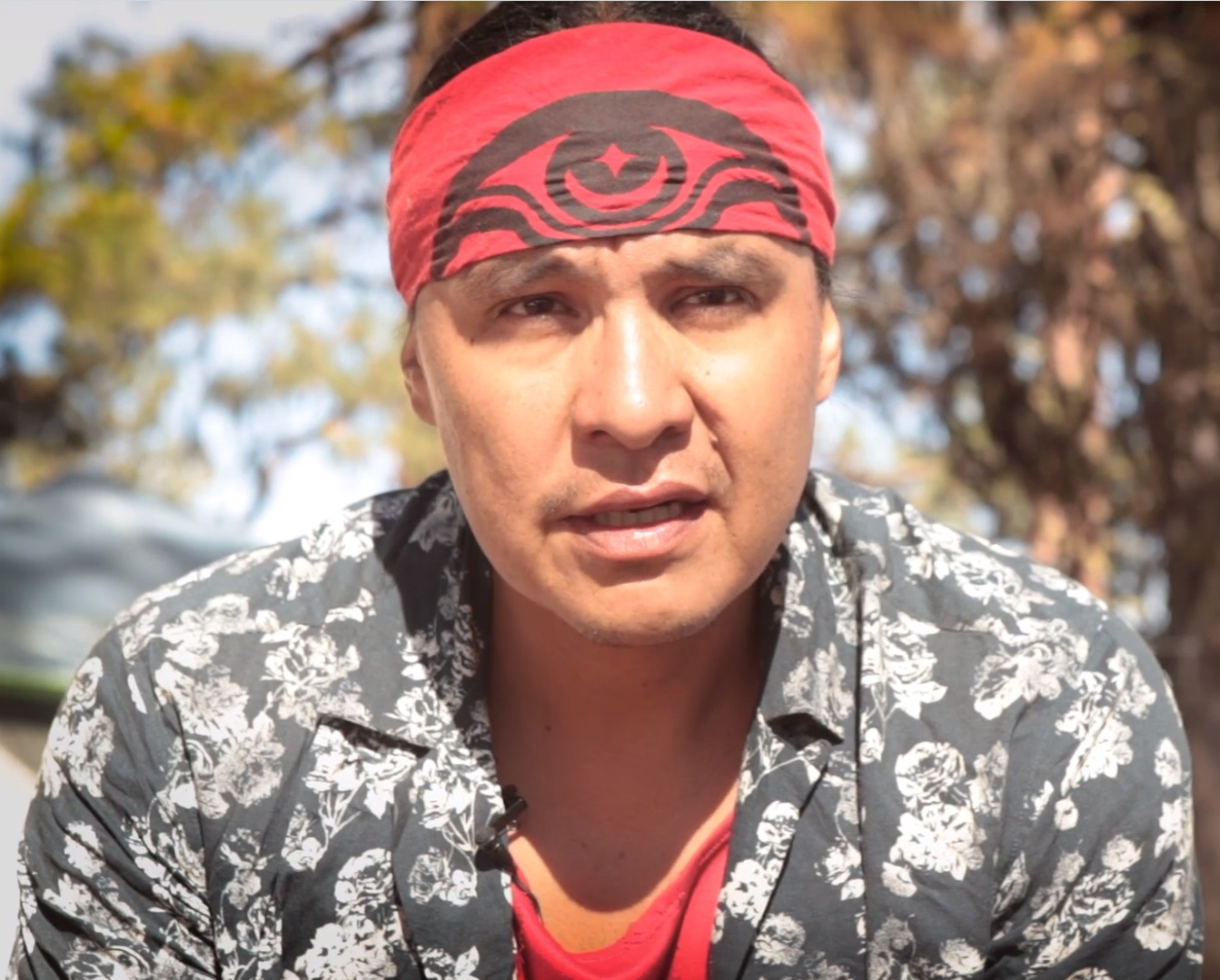
- Chase Iron Eyes speaks in 2017
- Born: Chase A. Iron Eyes; March 6, 1978 (age 48)
- Education: University of North Dakota (AB); University of Denver Sturm College of Law (JD)
- Occupations: Lawyer; Indigenous activist; Writer
- Years active: 2011–present
- Organization: Lakota People's Law Project
- Political party: Independent
- Spouse: Sara Jumping Eagle
- Children: 3, including Tokata Iron Eyes

Chase Iron Eyes (born March 6, 1978) is a Native American activist, attorney, politician, and a member of the Oglala Sioux Tribe. He is a member of the Lakota People's Law Project and a co-founder of the Native American news website Last Real Indians. In April 2016 he announced his candidacy for the United States House of Representatives for North Dakota's at-large congressional district. He lost to incumbent Kevin Cramer.

== Career ==
Iron Eyes graduated from the University of North Dakota with a bachelor's degree in political science and Native American studies. In 2007, he graduated from the University of Denver Sturm College of Law, with a Juris Doctor in law (with an emphasis in Federal Indian law). Iron Eyes was also the president of the Native American Law Student Association during his academic career in law school. Iron Eyes is licensed to practice law within the state of South Dakota as well as in the federal courts of both North Dakota and South Dakota in addition to several tribal court systems.

In July 2012, Iron Eyes filed a civil suit in federal court on behalf of Vern Traversie, a blind 69-year-old Lakota man, against a South Dakota hospital. The lawsuit alleged a violation of Traversie's civil rights, citing scars that Traversie said were from doctors carving the initials of the Ku Klux Klan into his abdomen during heart surgery. The hospital stated the marks were a reaction to surgical tape, and in 2015, a jury ruled against Traversie.

== Activism ==
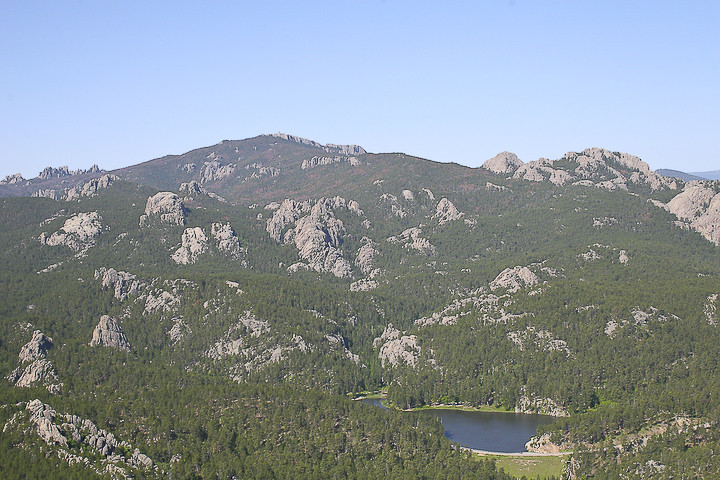
Pe' Sla is a part of the Black Hills, pictured here, that is sacred to the Lakota.

Iron Eyes has used his career as an attorney to advocate for Native American civil rights. He has served as a staff attorney for the Lakota People's Law Project (LPLP), an initiative founded in 2005 with the purpose of ending the unlawful practice of removing Lakota children from their families and placing them in foster care outside their communities. In the summer of 2016, Iron Eyes and other representatives of LPLP joined with other anti-pipeline protestors near Standing Rock to resist the Dakota Access pipeline.

Iron Eyes has actively engaged in the protection of sacred sites. He was instrumental in raising awareness of Pe' Sla, a high mountain prairie situated within the heart of the Black Hills, a sacred site related to Lakota creation beliefs where annual ceremonies, village gatherings, and other traditional activities took place, located north of Deerfield Lake and west of Black Elk Peak. This is the area where renowned Lakota visionary Black Elk sought his vision. Another of the sacred sites Iron Eyes has drawn attention to is Bear Butte.

He is also a member of the Bush Foundation's Native Nation Rebuilders program, a leadership development program designed to foster innovative tribal governance practices to effect positive change. He has continued to voice opposition against the drilling of oil wells within the area.

In 2016, Iron Eyes announced his candidacy as a member of the Democratic Party for the election to represent North Dakota's at-large congressional district in the United States House of Representatives. Speaking to Prairie Public Radio in April, he said, "I'm running for Congress out of necessity [...] I see that our government is broken, and I feel responsible to do my part to try and fix this on behalf of North Dakota", as reported by Indian Country Today Media Network.

== Personal life ==
Iron Eyes was raised on the Standing Rock Indian Reservation, and since then has lived in a multitude of places.

Chase is an enrolled member of the Oglala Sioux Tribe.

On June 8, 2022, Iron Eyes and his wife, Dr. Sara Jumping Eagle, filed legal documents asking a judge to issue court protection against Ezra Miller on behalf of their 18-year-old daughter, Tokata Iron Eyes, due to Miller allegedly using "violence, intimidation, threat of violence, fear, paranoia, delusions, and drugs [including marijuana and LSD]" to hold sway over her. Their "friendship", which began in 2016 when Miller was 23 and Tokata Iron Eyes was 12, also included Tokata Iron Eyes flying to London the following year to visit Miller on the set of Fantastic Beasts and Where to Find Them and dropping out of school in 2021 to follow Miller. Iron Eyes and Dr. Jumping Eagle also alleged in their documents that their daughter had taken bruises from Miller and that Miller had misgendered her. Tokata Iron Eyes responded by denying her parents' allegations and saying that she was mentally stable and was in contact with a mental health professional.

== Filmography ==
Film
Year	Film	Role	Notes
2014	Mitakeoyashin	Himself	Documentary

== Electoral history ==
2016 North Dakota at-large congressional district Democratic primary
Party	Candidate	Votes	%
Democratic–NPL	Chase Iron Eyes	17,063	99.7
Democratic–NPL	Write-ins	59	0.3
Total votes		17,122	100.0

2016 North Dakota at-large congressional district election
Party	Candidate	Votes	%	±%
Republican	Kevin Cramer (incumbent)	233,980	69.13%	+13.59%
Democratic–NPL	Chase Iron Eyes	80,377	23.75%	−14.73%
Libertarian	Jack Seaman	23,528	6.95%	+1.11%
n/a	Write-ins	574	0.17%	+0.02%
Total votes		338,459	100.0%	N/A
Republican hold				
