= Ezra Miller =

American actor (born 1992)

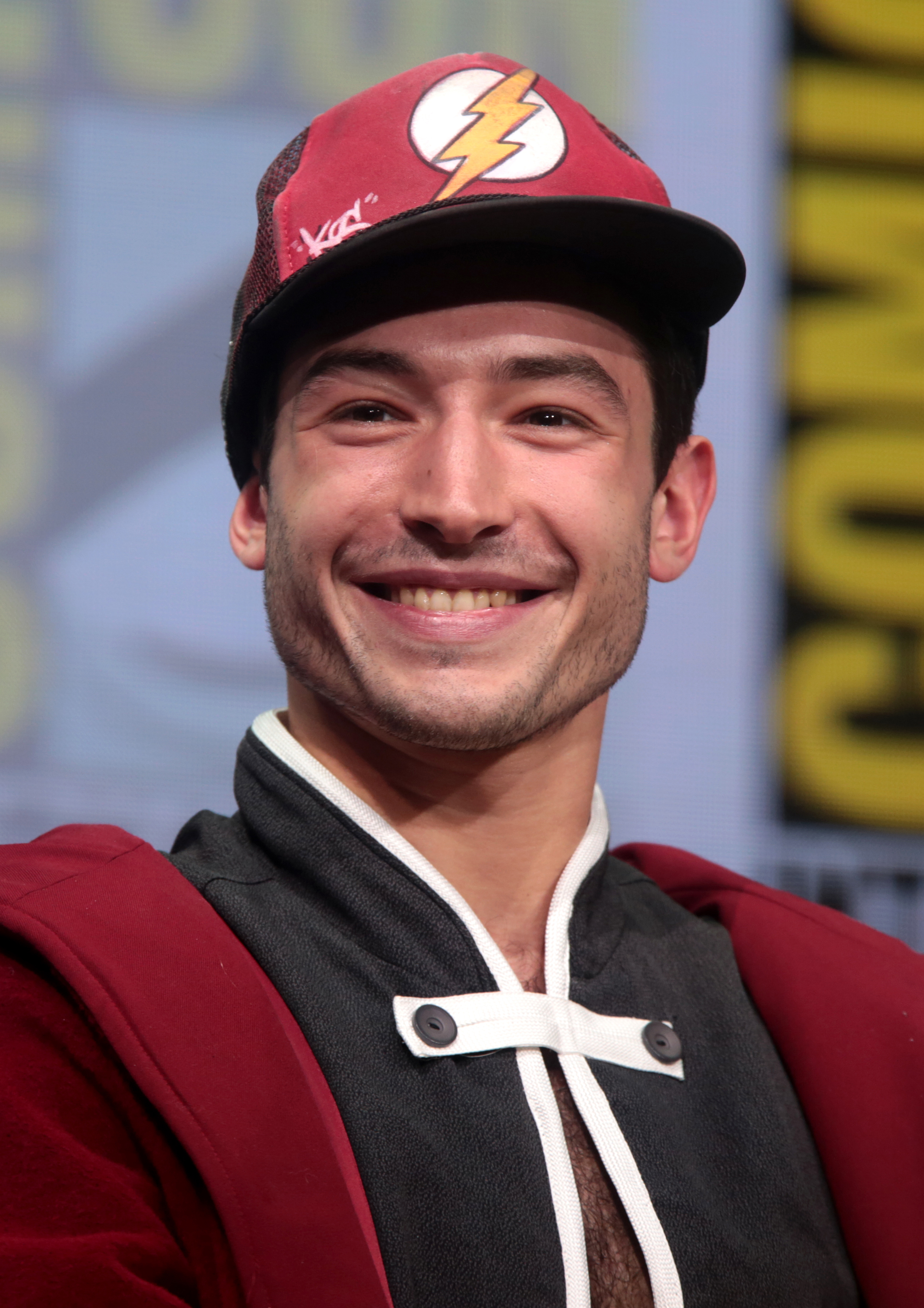
- Miller at the 2017 San Diego Comic-Con
- Born: Ezra Matthew Miller; September 30, 1992 (age 34); Wyckoff, New Jersey, U.S.
- Occupation: Actor
- Years active: 2007–2023

Ezra Matthew Miller (born September 30, 1992) is an American actor. Their (Note: Miller uses they/them, it, and zir pronouns. This article uses they/them for consistency.) feature film debut was in Afterschool (2008), which they followed by starring in the dramas We Need to Talk About Kevin (2011) and The Perks of Being a Wallflower (2012).

After a supporting role in the comedy Trainwreck (2015), Miller played Credence Barebone in the Fantastic Beasts films Fantastic Beasts and Where to Find Them (2016), Fantastic Beasts: The Crimes of Grindelwald (2018), and Fantastic Beasts: The Secrets of Dumbledore (2022). In 2020, they had a recurring role in the miniseries The Stand. From 2016 to 2023, Miller played the Flash in the DC Extended Universe, mainly in Justice League (2017) and The Flash (2023).

Off-screen, Miller has faced multiple legal issues, including arrests for disorderly conduct, assault, and burglary, as well as allegations of harassment and inappropriate behavior involving minors, which resulted in temporary restraining orders.

== Early life ==
Ezra Matthew Miller was born in Wyckoff, New Jersey, on September 30, 1992. They have two older sisters named Saiya and Caitlin. Their mother, Marta Miller (née Koch), is a modern dancer. Their father, Robert S. Miller, was senior vice president and managing director of Hyperion Books, and later became a publisher at Workman Publishing. Miller's father is Jewish; their mother is of Dutch and German descent. Miller identifies as Jewish and "spiritual". At the age of six, they started to train as an opera singer to overcome their stuttering. They have sung with the Metropolitan Opera, and performed in the American premiere of Philip Glass's opera White Raven. Miller attended Rockland Country Day School and The Hudson School, dropping out at age 16 after the release of the film Afterschool. Miller attended Bard College for six months before dropping out to pursue an acting career full time.

== Career ==
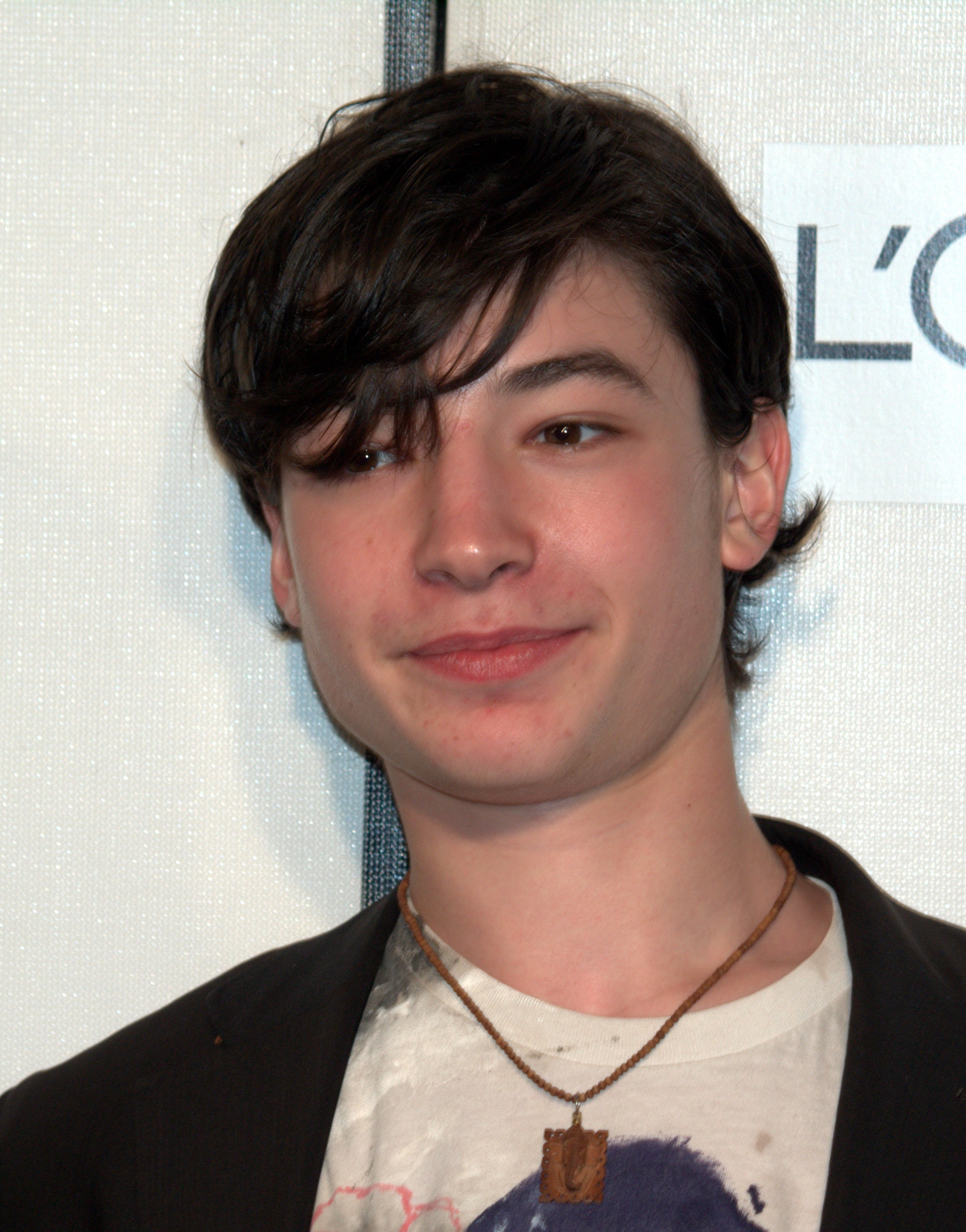
Miller at the 2009 Tribeca Film Festival

Miller's career in film began in 2008 with Antonio Campos' Afterschool, in the role of a teenager at a boarding school who accidentally films the drug-related deaths of two classmates, and is then asked to put together a memorial video. The following year, they appeared in City Island with Andy García, Julianna Margulies, and Steven Strait. In 2010, Miller portrayed the lead of Beware the Gonzo and had a supporting role in Every Day, both of which premiered at the Tribeca Film Festival. They next appeared in the BBC Films drama We Need to Talk About Kevin (2011), alongside Tilda Swinton and John C. Reilly, which was adapted and directed by Lynne Ramsay from American author Lionel Shriver's 2003 novel of the same name. In television, Miller played Damien on the Showtime hit comedy series Californication. They then appeared on Royal Pains as Tucker Bryant for two seasons. In the 2012 film adaptation of the novel The Perks of Being a Wallflower, Miller played Patrick, alongside Logan Lerman and Emma Watson.

Miller has been credited with singing, drumming and percussion on musical recordings by the band Sons of an Illustrious Father as early as 2011. The band is a trio that features Lilah Larson (vocals, guitar, bass and drums), Josh Aubin (bass, keyboards, guitar, vocals), and Miller. In 2019, the band released a cover of "Don't Cha" by the Pussycat Dolls and Miller appeared in its music video.

Miller played Credence Barebone in the 2016 film Fantastic Beasts and Where to Find Them, a spin-off of the Harry Potter film series. They reprised the role in the film's sequel, Fantastic Beasts: The Crimes of Grindelwald, which was released in November 2018, and in Fantastic Beasts: The Secrets of Dumbledore, released in April 2022.

Miller portrays Barry Allen as the Flash in Warner Bros.' DC adaptations, first appearing in cameos in Batman v Superman: Dawn of Justice and Suicide Squad, and continuing the role as one of the leads in Justice League. They played the character in the standalone film The Flash, which was released in 2023; this made them the first openly nonbinary person to play the lead role in a major superhero franchise film.

Miller attended Middle East Film and Comic Con in 2018, representing their character in the DC Comics franchise film Justice League. In 2020, they reprised the role of the Flash for a cameo appearance in the Arrowverse crossover event, Crisis on Infinite Earths.

In December 2020, Miller portrayed Trashcan Man in the Paramount+ television miniseries The Stand, based on the Stephen King novel of the same name.

In May 2025, it was reported that Miller would be the main character in a vampire movie that is in development and will be directed by Lynne Ramsay.

== Personal life ==
In 2010, Miller briefly dated Zoë Kravitz during the production Beware the Gonzo.

Miller later became engaged to a woman named Erin. They began dating in 2016, but called it off after a spiritual advisor told Miller that she was a "parasite".

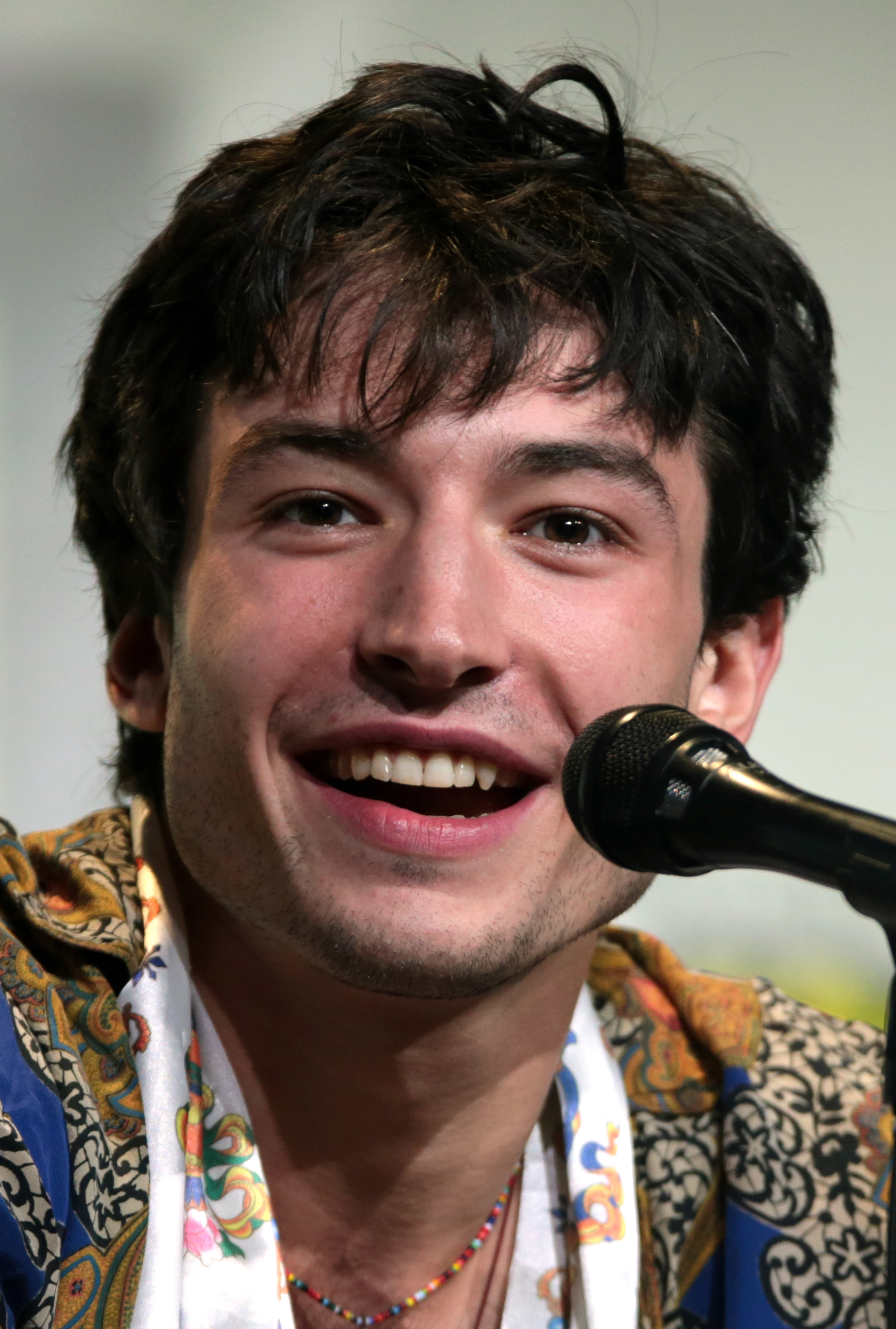
Miller at the 2016 San Diego Comic-Con for Fantastic Beasts and Where to Find Them

Miller came out as queer in 2012, but later said they avoided the use of the label "queer". They also said in 2018, "Queer just means no, I don't do that. I don't identify as a man. I don't identify as a woman. I barely identify as a human." Miller began using they/them pronouns, which GQ wrote in 2020 was "a pointed refusal to be gendered". They previously used all pronouns interchangeably; as of 2022, Miller uses they/them, it, and zir pronouns. Having expressed an interest in "kissing boys" at a young age, Miller said, "The way I would choose to identify myself wouldn't be gay. I've been attracted mostly to 'shes' but I've been with many people and I'm open to love whatever it can be." Miller also commented on having "a lot of really wonderful friends who are of very different sexes and genders. I am very much in love with no one in particular."

In 2018, Miller showed support for the #MeToo movement and revealed a personal experience concerning a Hollywood producer and a director, both of whom were left unnamed: "They gave me wine and I was underaged. They were like, 'Hey, want to be in our movie about gay revolution?' And I was like, 'No, you guys are monsters.'"

In November 2018, Miller announced that they were in a polyamorous relationship with multiple people, including their bandmates in the rock band Sons of an Illustrious Father.

Following their parents' divorce in 2019, the status of Miller's mental health began to deteriorate, although their spokesperson denied that it was caused by the divorce. According to Insider, Miller began to travel while wearing a bulletproof vest and carrying at least one firearm in early 2022, following fears that they were being followed by members of the Ku Klux Klan and the Federal Bureau of Investigation (FBI). Tokata Iron Eyes, an associate of Miller, later referred to their bulletproof vest as "a fashionable safety measure in response to actual attacks and received death threats".

Miller attended the 2019 Met Gala with makeup designed by Mimi Choi meant to appear as though Miller had seven eyes.

On January 27, 2022, Miller posted a video on Instagram that seemed to threaten members of the Ku Klux Klan operating in Beulaville, North Carolina. In response, the Southern Poverty Law Center reported no knowledge of recent Klan activity in Beulaville.

On August 15, 2022, a representative of Miller released a statement to Variety in which Miller apologized for their past behavior, stating that they had recently "gone through a time of intense crisis" and had begun treatment for "complex mental health issues". A September 2022 article in Vanity Fair quoted others as saying Miller has claimed to be Jesus, the devil, and the next Messiah. It also reported that they believed their relationship with Iron Eyes would bring about the apocalypse and Freemasons were sending demons to kill them.

== Legal issues ==
=== Disorderly conduct ===
On June 28, 2011, in the midst of filming The Perks of Being a Wallflower, Miller was a passenger in a vehicle that was pulled over in Pittsburgh for a broken brake light; police discovered 20 grams of marijuana in Miller's possession. The actor was initially charged with drug possession, but the charge was later dropped by a judge. They instead faced a penalty of $600 for two citations of disorderly conduct. They later remarked, "I don't feel like there's any need to hide the fact that I smoke pot. It's a harmless herbal substance that increases sensory appreciation."

=== Strangulation incident ===
On April 6, 2020, a video surfaced in a since-deleted tweet that appeared to show Miller strangling a woman and throwing her to the ground. The video was confirmed by Variety to have taken place at Prikið Kaffihús, a bar in Reykjavík, Iceland, that Miller frequents when in the city. A bar employee identified the person in the video as Miller, who was escorted off the premises by staff after the incident.

In September 2022, a representative for Miller claimed that the supposed strangulation was a "spontaneous reaction" spurred by "a group of teenagers" taunting Miller over their mixed martial arts skills, and that they did not strangle the woman but "went at her collarbone".

=== Hawaii incidents ===
In March 2022, Miller was on the island of Hawaii. From March 7 through March 28, Miller was the subject of ten calls to the police because of various minor incidents, such as filming people at a gas station, loitering on a restaurant's sidewalk, and arguing with people. Eventually, Miller was invited to live with a couple at a hostel in Hilo after Miller became acquainted with them at a farmer's market.

On March 28, Miller was arrested in Hilo. Police said Miller had a physical altercation with patrons after cursing at customers at a karaoke bar. Miller was charged with disorderly conduct and harassment. Miller later claimed to have become enraged after being "accosted by a Nazi", but Hawaii Police Assistant Chief Kenneth Quiocho stated that Miller's outrage was caused by patrons of the bar singing Lady Gaga and Bradley Cooper's song "Shallow". Miller claimed to have filmed the incident so the footage could later be used as "NFT crypto art". During the arrest, Miller said that they were being "unlawfully persecuted" and, after members of the police misgendered them, accused the officers of intentionally committing a hate crime.

Three days later, the couple Miller had been staying with were granted a temporary restraining order against Miller after Miller allegedly threatened the two and stole the wife's passport and the husband's wallet. According to the couple, the threat and theft took place on the same night as Miller's arrest at the karaoke bar, hours after the husband bailed Miller out of jail for $500. The allegation involved Miller barging into the couple's bedroom and threatening "I will bury you and your slut wife." Soon after, Miller fled Hilo with a friend to stay in Volcano, Hawaii. The couple later dropped their petition for the order on April 11.

On April 19, Miller was again taken into custody for second-degree assault by Leilani Estates Subdivision police authorities in Pāhoa. According to Midi Libre, they were arrested for throwing a chair, which hit a 26-year-old woman and left a half-inch cut on her forehead, after being told to leave during a private get-together. Miller was arrested 20 minutes after the attack during a traffic stop in Kea'au. Within hours of this second arrest, Miller pleaded no contest to the karaoke incident and was fined $500 for disorderly conduct by judge Kanani Laubach.

=== Relationship with Tokata Iron Eyes and messiah claims ===
In June 2022, the Standing Rock Sioux tribal court issued a temporary order of protection against Miller on behalf of 18-year-old activist Tokata Iron Eyes. Her parents, Chase Iron Eyes and Sara Jumping Eagle, said they requested the court order because of Miller's use of "violence, intimidation, threat of violence, fear, paranoia, delusions, and drugs" to hold sway over their child. The relationship between Miller and Iron Eyes, which began in 2016 when Miller was aged 23 and Iron Eyes was aged 12, also included Iron Eyes flying to London in 2017 to visit Miller on the set of The Crimes of Grindelwald. Iron Eyes dropped out of school in 2021, which her parents believe she did to follow Miller. Her parents also stated in court documents that Miller had caused bruises on their child's body, and that Miller has groomed and manipulated her. Text and video responses were later posted on the Instagram account believed to belong to Tokata Iron Eyes, denying her parents' allegations; the parents countered by claiming their child did not have control over her social media account. Tokata Iron Eyes stated in a video response that it was her own choice not to have a phone. Law enforcement were initially unable to locate Miller to serve them with the order. Miller then posted messages, since deleted, on Instagram mocking the court's attempts to find them. Iron Eyes's parents later attempted to obtain a permanent order of protection against Miller, but it was eventually dismissed. They also withdrew their request for the custody of Iron Eyes who by this point had reached the age of majority.

In August, Miller's former music collaborator Oliver Ignatius stated that he had witnessed Miller verbally abuse Iron Eyes over her wearing makeup. Iron Eyes defended Miller by referring to the incident as "a catty comment" and a part of "queer dialogue"; she called the allegation of abuse "homophobic". A former resident of Miller's farm in Vermont explained that Miller believed people criticized their relationship with Iron Eyes because she is "an apocalyptic Native American spider goddess" who, along with Miller as Jesus Christ, will bring about an Indigenous revolution. Miller refers to themself as a Messiah to Native Americans. Miller does not have Indigenous ancestry, and their attitude toward the Native American community has been strongly criticized by some within it.

Iron Eyes and Miller remained in contact following the allegations. In January 2024, the two, along with collaborator Jay Wasley, formed the band Hundred in the Hand. In August of the same year, Iron Eyes’ parents withdrew their complaint against Miller, stating that the original filing was “based on information from a witness who [later] recanted.”

=== Harassment allegations ===
On June 16, 2022, a mother and her twelve-year-old child were granted a temporary harassment prevention order against Miller in Massachusetts after they said that Miller threatened the woman's family and showed inappropriate behavior towards the child. The child, their mother, and a neighbor corroborated that Miller brandished a gun in anger and behaved inappropriately toward the child, fixating on them, hugging them, and touching their hips.

The child's mother told Business Insider that Miller had known the family since February, had taken an interest in the child because of their "style and maturity level", and had offered to start a clothing line with the child and fund their attendance to a design school. The mother also said that Miller considered the child to be a powerful "mystical being" who "would be lucky to have Ezra to guide and protect them." Shortly before the harassment prevention order was granted in June, the mother stated, Miller arrived at the family's house dressed as a cowboy and attempted to buy horses for the child.

No criminal charges were filed and the order was lifted on June 30, 2023. Miller's attorney Marissa Elkins stated that all of the encounters between them and the child were initiated by the mother, that they were never alone with the child and they only interacted twice for a short while in front of other adults. She also denied that Miller had brandished a gun and stated that they had been unable to come to court to defend themselves when the order was issued.

=== Vermont farm incidents ===
As reported by Rolling Stone, Miller had been housing a mother they met in Hilo, Hawaii, and her three young children on Miller's farm in Stamford, Vermont, since mid-April 2022. Multiple sources, including the children's father, alleged that guns and ammunition are easily accessible to the children and that the one-year-old put a loose bullet in her mouth. The mother claimed that Miller was offering shelter from her ex-husband, whom she alleged was abusive. Further claims include assault rifles being propped up on piles of the children's stuffed animals, and "heavy marijuana use", with people smoking marijuana in front of the children in rooms without proper ventilation, including a witness stating that he "saw Miller blow marijuana smoke in the baby's face and use their arm to waft more smoke in the baby's direction." Rolling Stone also published that Miller has been running a large, unlicensed marijuana cultivation operation.

On the weekend of August 6, 2022, Vermont State Police approached Miller's residence and "repeatedly attempted to serve the mother an emergency care order that demanded the children's removal from her care and the home over fear for their safety." Police and social workers were unable to locate the children or the mother. Miller told police that the woman and her children do not live there, and had not "for the past two months". Contradicting Miller, the DCF caseworker, in her affidavit to the Court, presented evidence that up until late July 2022, the woman had been regularly posting images on social media that confirm that she was living with Miller. The Vermont State Attorney's office stated that Miller's response "seemed like an attempt to 'evade service'" of the order.

=== Burglary charge ===
On August 7, 2022, Miller was charged with felony burglary in Stamford, Vermont, stemming from what the police report indicated was theft of bottles of alcohol from a private home in May 2022, according to Vermont State Police. According to the report, Miller was identified by police via video surveillance footage. Miller was due to be arraigned in court on September 26, 2022. A week prior to the planned arraignment date, a representative for Miller stated that the home was owned by a former childhood friend of Miller's and that Miller believed that they were welcome to enter the home to obtain rice wine for cooking.

The arraignment was later pushed back to October 17, 2022. Appearing in court remotely on that date, Miller pleaded not guilty to the charges. The next hearing on this case was scheduled for January 13, 2023. A day before the scheduled hearing, Miller accepted a plea deal, pleading guilty to trespassing, with the burglary and petit larceny charges being dropped. On the day of the hearing, Miller's trespassing plea was approved by the court. Miller was handed 12 months probation by Judge Kerry Ann McDonald-Cady at Bennington County Superior Court, Vermont. Miller told the court they believe they can comply with the stipulations of the one-year probation, which included no contact with the victims, continuing their mental health treatment, random alcohol screenings, and not being convicted of a criminal offense, among others.

== Filmography ==
=== Film ===
Year	Title	Role	Notes
2008	Afterschool	Robert	
2009	City Island	Vince Jr.	
2010	Beware the Gonzo	Eddie "Gonzo" Gilman	
2010	Every Day	Jonah	
2011	Another Happy Day	Elliot	
2011	Busted Walk	Jay	Short film
2011	We Need to Talk About Kevin	Kevin / Teenager	
2012	The Perks of Being a Wallflower	Patrick	
2014	Madame Bovary	Léon Dupuis	
2015	The Stanford Prison Experiment	Daniel Culp / 8612	
2015	Trainwreck	Donald	
2016	Batman v Superman: Dawn of Justice	Barry Allen / The Flash	Cameo
2016	Suicide Squad	Barry Allen / The Flash	Cameo
2016	Fantastic Beasts and Where to Find Them	Credence Barebone	
2016	Where's Waldo?	Agent Murmur	Short
2017	Justice League	Barry Allen / The Flash	
2018	Fantastic Beasts: The Crimes of Grindelwald	Credence Barebone	
2019	Hanukkah, O Hanukkah (A Magical Time of Year)	Player	Short; also producer
2019	Palm: Unstatus Quo	Modelling Man	Short
2021	Zack Snyder's Justice League (Note: Miller filmed an additional scene for this new cut of the film.)	Barry Allen / The Flash	Director's cut of Justice League
2021	Asking for It	Mark Vanderhill	Also producer
2022	Fantastic Beasts: The Secrets of Dumbledore	Credence Barebone	
2022	Neptune Frost	—N/a	Producer only
2023	Dalíland	Young Dali	
2023	The Flash	Barry Allen / The Flash	Also additional writer

=== Television ===
Year	Title	Role	Notes
2008	Cakey! The Cake from Outer Space	Bully	1 episode
2008	Californication	Damien Patterson	5 episodes
2009	Law & Order: Special Victims Unit	Ethan Morse	Episode: "Crush"
2009–2010	Royal Pains	Tucker Bryant	5 episodes
2020	Arrow	Barry Allen / The Flash	Episode: "Crisis on Infinite Earths: Part Four"; cameo
2021	The Stand	Trashcan Man	Miniseries
2021	Invincible	D.A. Sinclair	Voice, episode: "You Look Kinda Dead"
2022	Peacemaker	Barry Allen / The Flash	Episode: "It's Cow or Never"; uncredited cameo

=== Video games ===
Year	Title	Voice role	Notes
2016	Lego Dimensions	Credence Barebone	DLC

== Awards and nominations ==
Year	Award	Nominated work	Result
2011	Hamptons International Film Festival for Breakthrough Performer	Another Happy Day	Won
2011	BIFA for Best Supporting Actor	We Need to Talk About Kevin	Nominated
2012	Critics' Choice Movie Award for Best Young Performer	We Need to Talk About Kevin	Nominated
2012	Boston Society of Film Critics Award for Best Supporting Actor	The Perks of Being a Wallflower	Won
2012	Hollywood Film Festival Spotlight Award	The Perks of Being a Wallflower	Won
2012	San Diego Film Critics Society Award for Best Cast	The Perks of Being a Wallflower	Won
2012	Santa Barbara International Film Festival — Virtuoso Award	The Perks of Being a Wallflower	Won
2012	Detroit Film Critics Society Award for Best Supporting Actor	The Perks of Being a Wallflower	Nominated
2013	MTV Movie Award for Best Breakthrough Performance	The Perks of Being a Wallflower	Nominated
2013	MTV Movie Awards for Best Musical Moment (shared with Logan Lerman and Emma Watson)	The Perks of Being a Wallflower	Nominated
2013	Phoenix Film Critics Society Award for Best Supporting Actor	The Perks of Being a Wallflower	Nominated
2017	San Diego Film Critics Society Award for Best Comedic Performance	Justice League	Nominated

== See also ==
- List of messiah claimants
- List of people claimed to be Jesus
