= Zoë Kravitz =

American actress (born 1988)

- Kravitz in 2025
- Born: Zoe Isabella Kravitz (Note: Naming laws in California do not allow special characters with accents (ë).); December 1, 1988 (age 37); Los Angeles, California, U.S.
- Occupations: Actress; singer; film director; screenwriter; producer
- Years active: 2006–present
- Spouse: Karl Glusman (m. 2019; div. 2021)
- Partners: Channing Tatum (2021–2024); Harry Styles (2025–present; engaged)
- Parents: Lenny Kravitz (father); Lisa Bonet (mother)

Zoë Isabella Kravitz (born December 1, 1988) is an American actress, singer, and filmmaker. She has received nominations for a Critics' Choice Award, a Primetime Emmy Award, and a Screen Actors Guild Award. In 2022, she was named by Time magazine as one of the 100 Most Influential People.

The daughter of actress Lisa Bonet and musician Lenny Kravitz, Kravitz made her acting debut in the romantic comedy film No Reservations (2007). Her breakthrough came with playing Angel Salvadore (Tempest) in the superhero film X-Men: First Class (2011), and she had further franchise roles in the dystopian action film series Divergent (2014–2016), the post-apocalyptic action film Mad Max: Fury Road (2015), the fantasy film series Fantastic Beasts (2016–2018), and the superhero film The Batman (2022). Kravitz has appeared in the independent films It's Kind of a Funny Story (2010), Dope (2015), Gemini (2017), Kimi (2022), and Caught Stealing (2025). She has voiced roles such as Catwoman in The Lego Batman Movie (2017) and Mary Jane in Spider-Man: Into the Spider-Verse (2018). She made her directorial debut with the psychological thriller film Blink Twice (2024).

On television, Kravitz took a supporting role in the HBO drama series Big Little Lies (2017–2019) and a leading role in the Hulu romantic comedy series High Fidelity (2020). She played a fictionalized version of herself in the Apple TV+ satirical comedy series The Studio (2025), for which she earned a nomination for the Primetime Emmy Award for Outstanding Guest Actress in a Comedy Series.

In music, Kravitz is the frontwoman of the group Lolawolf. She has also contributed to releases from artists such as Drake, Taylor Swift, Rae Sremmurd, and Janelle Monáe.

== Early life and education ==
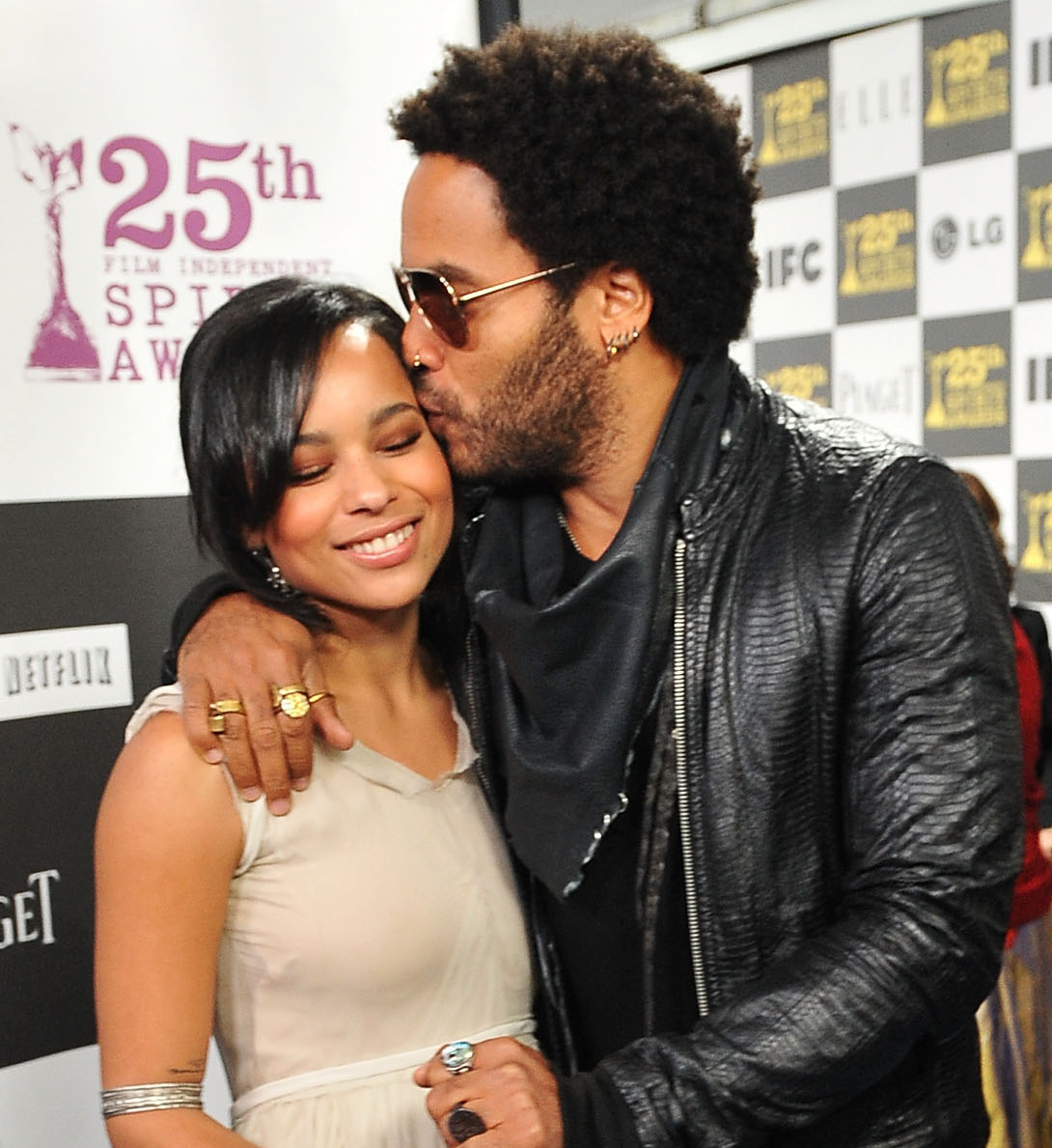
Kravitz with her father Lenny Kravitz, March 2010

Zoë Isabella Kravitz was born on December 1, 1988, in Venice, Los Angeles, California, at the home of her parents, musician Lenny Kravitz and actress Lisa Bonet. Both her parents are of half African-American and half-Ashkenazi Jewish descent.

Kravitz's paternal grandmother, actress Roxie Roker, a first cousin once-removed of television weather forecaster Al Roker, and her maternal grandfather, Allen Bonet, were African American, with some of her grandmother's family being from The Bahamas. Kravitz's paternal grandfather, NBC television news producer Sy Kravitz, and maternal grandmother, Arlene Litman, were both Ashkenazi Jews. The family of Kravitz's paternal grandfather emigrated from Ukraine. She identifies as a secular Jew. The song "Flowers for Zoë", included on her father's second album Mama Said, was written as a tribute to the two-year-old Zoë.

Kravitz's parents married in 1987 and divorced in 1993. She lived with her mother in Topanga Canyon and then moved to Miami at age 11 to live with her father, spending summers with her mother. Kravitz has two half-siblings from her mother's second marriage to actor Jason Momoa. Her godfather is film producer Bruce Cohen, and her godmothers are actresses Marisa Tomei and Cree Summer.

Kravitz attended Miami Country Day School and Rudolf Steiner School in Manhattan, graduating in 2007. She struggled with anorexia and bulimia throughout high school, until around age 24. She began studying that year at the acting conservatory under Scott McCrea at the State University of New York at Purchase, where her peers included Micah Stock and Jason Ralph. She left college after a year and moved to Brooklyn to work in films.

== Career ==
=== 2008–2012: Early work and breakthrough ===
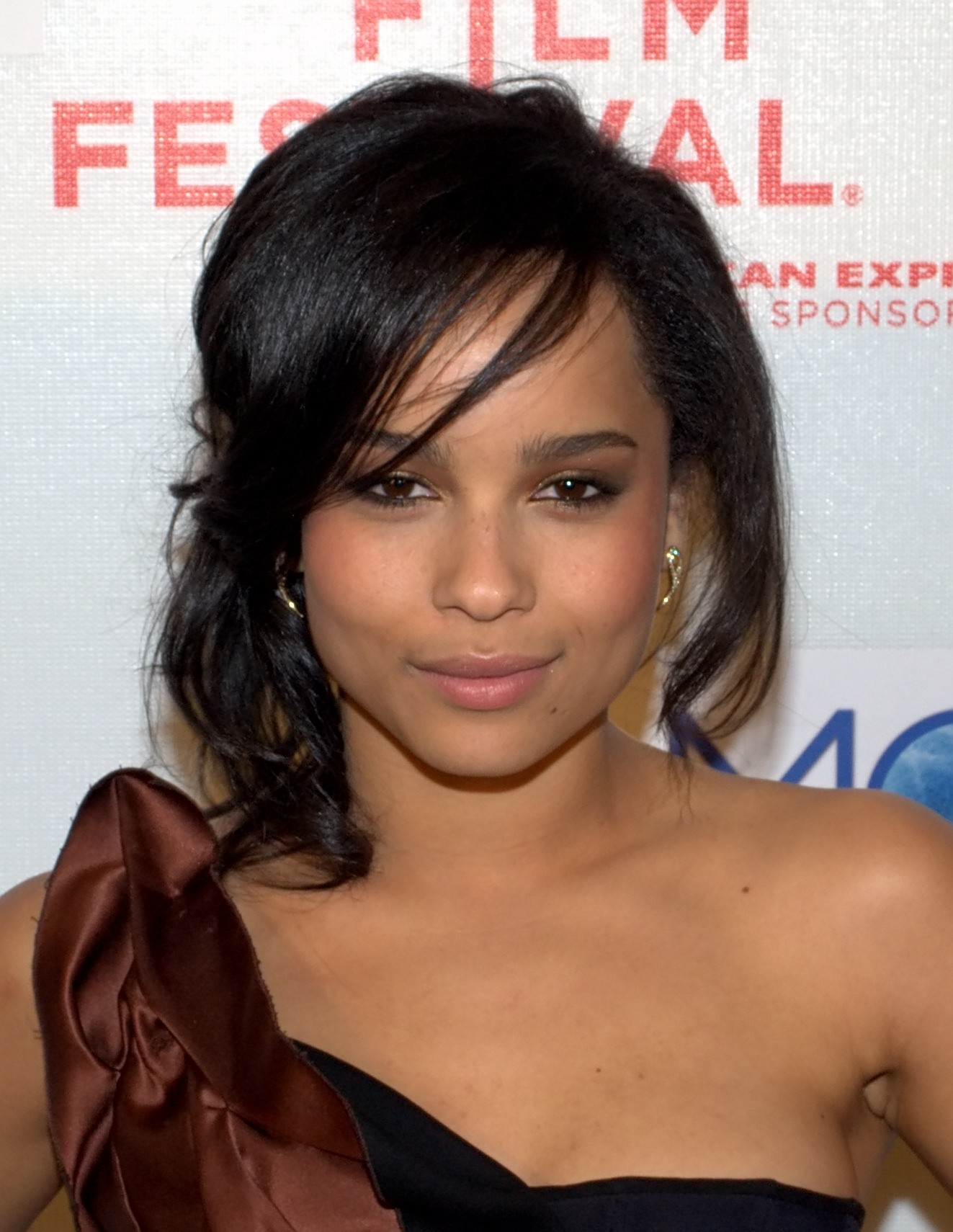
Kravitz at the Tribeca Film Festival, mid 2010

In Topanga Canyon, Zoë joined local drama clubs and staged shows at her grandmother's house, usually reenacting "Somewhere Over the Rainbow". Her mother encouraged her to watch film favorites from her own childhood. Kravitz landed her first film role in high school, playing a babysitter hired by Catherine Zeta-Jones's character in the 2007 romantic comedy No Reservations. She also appeared in the action thriller The Brave One. In 2008, Kravitz appeared in the music video for Jay Z's "I Know" and sang in will.i.am's music video for "We Are the Ones" in support of US presidential candidate Barack Obama.

In 2008, she also appeared in the family drama Birds of America and neo-noir comedy Assassination of a High School President. She began making music at the age of 16. In 2009, she formed and fronted the New York/Philadelphia-based band Elevator Fight. The band performed at the South by Southwest music festival and on the main stage of the Roots Picnic in Philadelphia in June 2009 along with The Roots, TV On The Radio, and The Black Keys. Kravitz said in 2011 that her music is a hobby. She also performed with the cabaret troupe The Citizens Band.

In 2009, Kravitz co-starred in the independent ensemble drama The Greatest, in which her character is addicted to grief counseling groups, and was hired to be the lead spokesperson for Vera Wang's Princess fragrance. In 2010, she appeared in It's Kind of a Funny Story and appeared in Twelve. Kravitz next starred in the romantic comedy Beware the Gonzo as the female lead and love interest of Ezra Miller. Kravitz was featured in a campaign for fashion designer Alexander Wang in 2010.

In 2011, Kravitz appeared in the coming-of-age film Yelling to the Sky. She also appeared in eight episodes of the Showtime television series Californication, in which she portrayed Pearl, the vocalist of the all-female band Queens of Dogtown. In 2011, she also portrayed the comic book character Angel Salvadore in X-Men: First Class. Kravitz filmed her scenes in London and performed wire work for her role, to simulate her character's ability to fly. In late 2011, Kravitz completed work on a film with the working title Treading Water, which was released in 2013 as The Boy Who Smells Like Fish. That year, she represented Vera Wang's new Preppy Princess fragrance.

=== 2013–2019: Rise to prominence ===
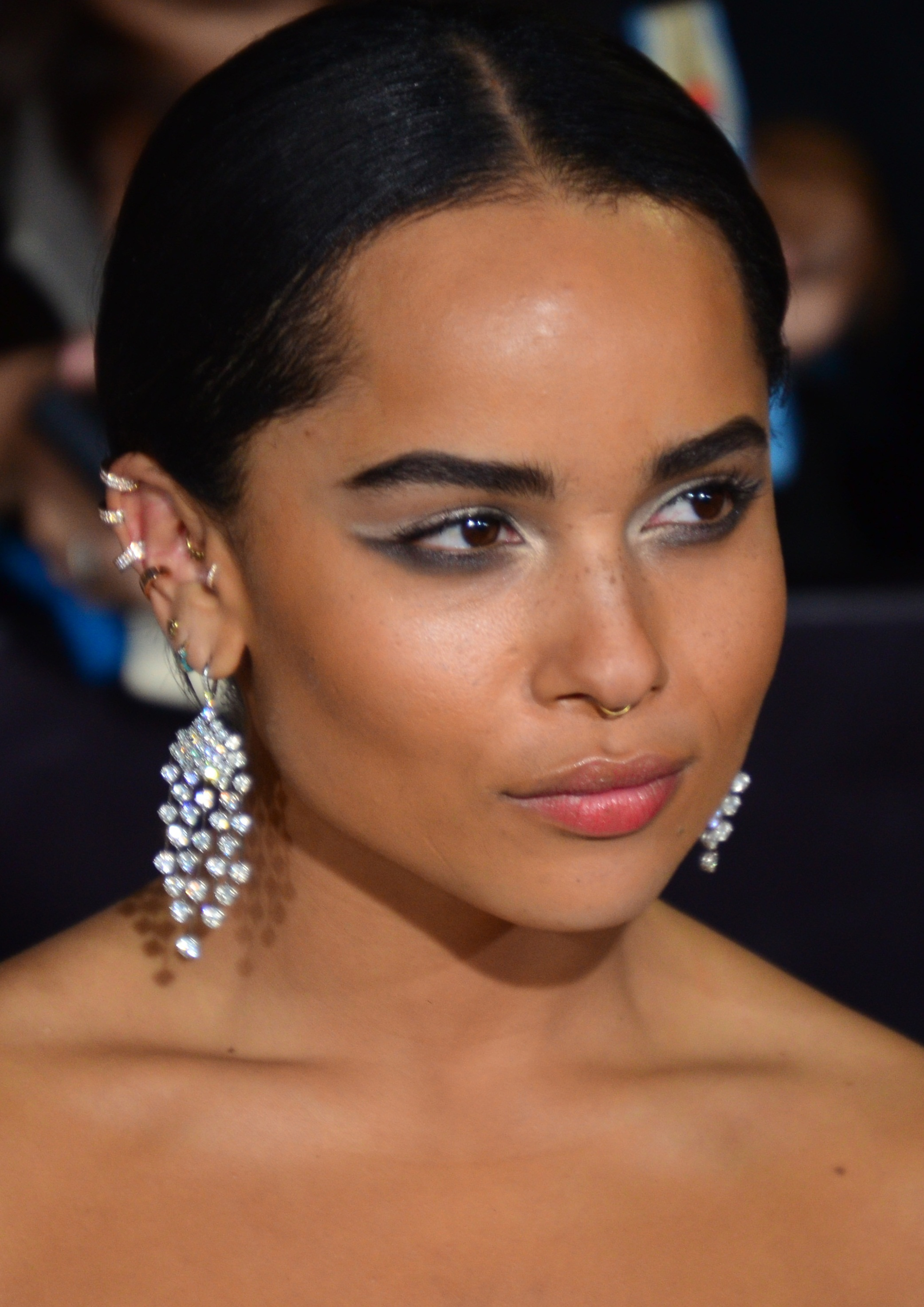
Kravitz at the premiere of Divergent March 2014

In 2013, Kravitz co-starred in After Earth. In 2013, she released a jewelry line in collaboration with the Swarovski crystal company. She used ethnic and vintage jewelry, and her birthstone, Turquoise, as inspiration for her designs. In 2014, she portrayed the character Christina in Divergent. Kravitz reprised her role in the sequels Insurgent and Allegiant. Also in 2014, she starred in the independent drama The Road Within and the romantic comedy Pretend We're Kissing. Kravitz started the band Lolawolf while in Los Angeles filming The Road Within. Made up of members from the band Reputante, Lolawolf released an eponymous EP and debuted at the Mercury Lounge in November 2013. The band was named after Kravitz's younger siblings, Lola and Nakoa-Wolf. They released their debut album, Calm Down, on October 21, 2014, and supported Lily Allen, Miley Cyrus, and Warpaint on tour in 2014. The band released the five-track EP, Every Fuckin Day, on June 23, 2015.

Kravitz appeared in 2014's Good Kill. In 2015, she appeared in the comedy-drama Dope and in Mad Max: Fury Road. In 2015, she became the face of Brooklyn-based designer Alexis Bittar's jewelry line. In 2016, she co-starred in the action thriller Vincent N Roxxy and appeared in the independent film Adam Green's Aladdin. Kravitz also had a role in the Harry Potter spin-off Fantastic Beasts and Where to Find Them as Leta Lestrange. In 2017, Kravitz starred in the mystery thriller Gemini. In the same year, she appeared in the comedy film Rough Night and the animated superhero film The Lego Batman Movie, in which she voiced the comic book character Selina Kyle / Catwoman.

From 2017 to 2019, Kravitz starred in the HBO drama series Big Little Lies, in which she portrays Bonnie Carlson. For her performance, she earned two Black Reel Award nominations as well as a nomination for the Screen Actors Guild Award for Outstanding Performance by a Cast in a Drama Series. Kravitz appeared in the 2018 science fiction action film Kin and reprised her role as Leta Lestrange in Fantastic Beasts: The Crimes of Grindelwald, in a larger capacity. Also in 2018, she appeared on BBC Children in Need with Eddie Redmayne, setting up Alex Jones from The One Show, with the help of children who fed them the answers to the interview questions. Kravitz was ranked one of the best dressed women in 2018 by fashion website Net-a-Porter. In the same year, Kravitz was featured on the song "Screwed" on Janelle Monáe's album Dirty Computer. She was also featured on "Anti-Social Smokers Club" on Rae Sremmurd's third album SR3MM.

=== 2020–present: Career expansion ===
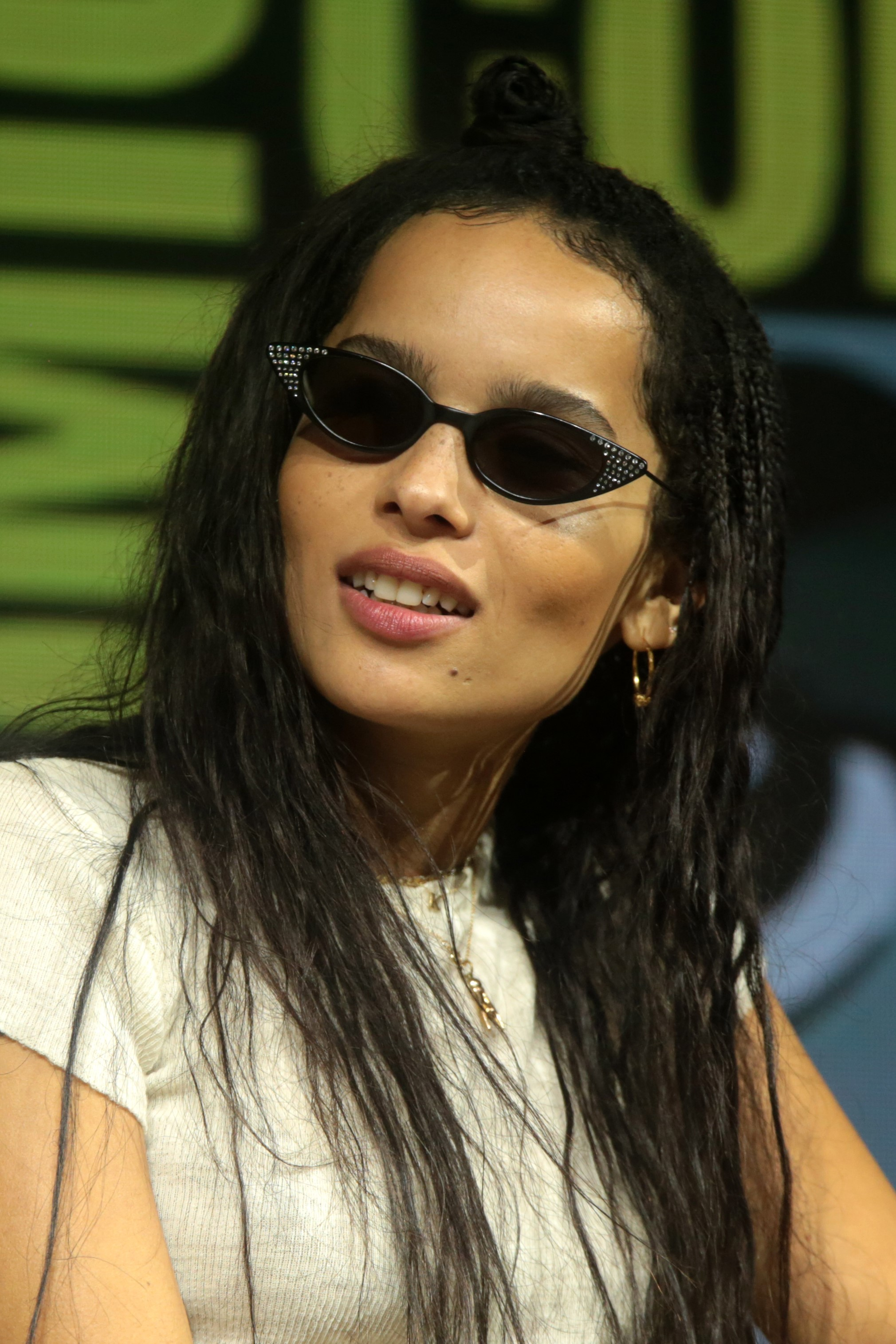
Kravitz at San Diego Comic Con in 2018

In 2019, Kravitz was cast as the lead in the Hulu romantic comedy television series High Fidelity, based on the 2000 film of the same name in which her mother stars. The series premiered on Valentine's Day, 2020 to critical acclaim with Kravitz's performance as Rob Gorgan receiving praise. Margaret Lyons of The New York Times described her performance as "mesmerizing", adding "She's so good, in fact, that it's almost impossible to believe she can't find someone to love her exactly as-is." Alison Herman of The Ringer called Kravitz a "bona-fide leading lady". Despite the critical success, High Fidelity was cancelled after one season. For her role in the series, Kravitz won a Black Reel Award and was nominated for a Satellite Award. Also in 2020, she starred as one of the leads in Viena and the Fantomes. In August 2021, it was announced that Kravitz would star and serve as an executive producer on coming-of-age animated series Phatty Patty, bankrolled by Will Smith and Jada Pinkett Smith's Westbrook Studios. In June 2022, it was announced that Kravitz would star in and produce the heist thriller The Sundance Kid Might Have Some Regrets for Warner Bros.

Kravitz portrayed Selina Kyle / Catwoman, now in live action, in director Matt Reeves' The Batman, which was released on March 4, 2022, to critical and commercial success, grossing over $700 million internationally. Kravitz's performance received positive reviews. Clarisse Loughrey of The Independent wrote that Kravitz "brings a sensuality that feels otherwise extinct from the comic-book genre", and in Christy Lemire's review of the film—written for RogerEbert.com—she stated that "This is no flirty, purring Catwoman: She's a fighter and a survivor with a loyal heart and a strong sense of what's right. ... Kravitz continues to reveal a fierce charisma and quiet strength." She earned several award nominations for her performance, including the Saturn Award for Best Actress. Kravitz starred in filmmaker Steven Soderbergh's thriller Kimi (2022), which was released to generally positive reviews with her performance receiving praise. Time named Kravitz one of the 100 Most Influential People in 2022. In 2024, Kravitz made her directorial debut in the thriller Blink Twice, a film she also co-wrote and starred in.

In May 2025, she collaborated with the champagne brand Dom Pérignon for a campaign named "Creation is an Eternal Journey". That same year she took a recurring guest role as a fictionalized version of herself in the Apple TV+ comedy series The Studio where she earned a nomination for the Primetime Emmy Award for Outstanding Guest Actress in a Comedy Series. She also co-starred opposite Austin Butler in the Darren Aronofsky crime thriller Caught Stealing (2025).

== Personal life ==
Kravitz lives in Williamsburg, Brooklyn.

She briefly dated Ezra Miller during filming on Beware the Gonzo in 2010. She was in a relationship with actor Penn Badgley from 2011 to 2013.

In 2016, Kravitz began a relationship with actor Karl Glusman. They became engaged in February 2018, and were married at Kravitz's father's home in Paris on June 29, 2019. In December 2020, Kravitz filed for divorce, which was finalized in August 2021. She started dating actor Channing Tatum in 2021, before announcing their engagement in 2023. In October 2024, it was reported that they had split up.

In August 2025, Kravitz was first linked to Harry Styles; in April 2026, it was reported that they were engaged.

== Filmography ==
=== Film ===
Year	Title	Role	Notes
2007	No Reservations	Charlotte	
2007	The Brave One	Chloe	
2008	Assassination of a High School President	Valerie	
2008	Birds of America	Gillian Tanager	
2009	The Greatest	Ashley	
2010	Twelve	Gabby	
2010	Beware the Gonzo	Evie Wallace	
2010	It's Kind of a Funny Story	Nia	
2011	Yelling to the Sky	Sweetness O'Hara	
2011	X-Men: First Class	Angel Salvadore	
2013	Treading Water	Laura	
2013	After Earth	Senshi Raige	
2014	Divergent	Christina	
2014	Pretend We're Kissing	Autumn	
2014	The Road Within	Marie	
2014	Good Kill	Vera Suarez	
2015	Dope	Nakia	
2015	The Divergent Series: Insurgent	Christina	
2015	Mad Max: Fury Road	Toast the Knowing	
2016	Too Legit	Sully	Short film
2016	The Divergent Series: Allegiant	Christina	
2016	Vincent N Roxxy	Roxxy	
2016	Adam Green's Aladdin	Old Miner	
2016	Fantastic Beasts and Where to Find Them	Leta Lestrange	Photographic cameo
2017	The Lego Batman Movie	Selina Kyle / Catwoman	Voice
2017	Gemini	Heather Anderson	
2017	Movie Sound Effects: How Do They Do That?	Selina Kyle / Catwoman	Voice; short film
2017	Rough Night	Blair	
2018	Kin	Milly	
2018	Fantastic Beasts: The Crimes of Grindelwald	Leta Lestrange	
2018	Spider-Man: Into the Spider-Verse	Mary Jane Parker	Voice
2020	Viena and the Fantomes	Madge	
2022	Kimi	Angela Childs	
2022	The Batman	Selina Kyle / Catwoman	
2024	Blink Twice	Swanky Stewardess	Cameo; also director, producer and co-screenwriter
2025	Caught Stealing	Yvonne	
2026	How to Rob a Bank	Reagan Gardner	
2027	Die Alive †		Filming

=== Television ===
Year	Title	Role	Notes
2011	Californication	Pearl	8 episodes
2016	Portlandia	Kendall	Episode: "Breaking Up"
2016	Morris & the Cow	Loretta	Voice; television short
2017, 2019	Big Little Lies	Bonnie Carlson	Main role
2020	High Fidelity	Robyn "Rob" Brooks	Lead role; also executive producer
2020	A World of Calm	Narrator	Voice; episode: "The Glassmaker"
2022	Saturday Night Live	Herself	Host; episode: "Zoë Kravitz/Rosalía"
2025	The Studio	Zoë	3 episodes

=== Music videos ===
Year	Title	Artist
2008	"I Know"	Jay-Z
2020	"Imagine"	Gal Gadot & Friends

=== Video games ===
Year	Title	Voice role	Ref(s)
2026	Unhinged	Ava	

== Awards and nominations ==
Organizations	Year	Category	Work	Result	Ref.
Astra Film Awards	2024	Best First Feature	Blink Twice	Nominated	
Austin Film Critics Association	2024	Best First Film	Blink Twice	Nominated	
Black Reel Awards	2011	Best Breakthrough Performance	It's Kind of a Funny Story	Nominated	
Black Reel Awards	2015	Best Supporting Actress	Dope	Nominated	
Black Reel Awards	2017	Outstanding Supporting Actress in a TV Movie/Limited Series	Big Little Lies	Nominated	
Black Reel Awards	2020	Outstanding Supporting Actress in a Drama Series	Big Little Lies	Nominated	
Black Reel Awards	2020	Outstanding Comedy Series	High Fidelity	Nominated	
Black Reel Awards	2020	Outstanding Actress in a Comedy Series	High Fidelity	Nominated	
Black Reel Awards	2020	Outstanding Writing for a Comedy Series (Note: (with E.T. Feigenbaum))	High Fidelity	Won	
Black Reel Awards	2025	Outstanding Independent Film	Blink Twice	Nominated	
Black Reel Awards	2025	Outstanding Director	Blink Twice	Nominated	
Black Reel Awards	2025	Outstanding First Screenplay	Blink Twice	Nominated	
Critics' Choice Super Awards	2023	Best Actress in a Superhero Movie	The Batman	Nominated	
Hollywood Critics Association	2022	Best Actress	The Batman	Nominated	
MTV Movie & TV Awards	2022	Best Kiss	The Batman	Nominated	
Milano Film Festival	2015	Best Supporting Actress	The Road Within	Won	
Napa Valley Film Festival	2014	Audience Award for Favorite Actress	The Road Within	Won	
NAACP Image Awards	2024	Outstanding Breakthrough Creative (Motion Picture)	Blink Twice	Nominated	
People's Choice Awards	2022	Action Movie Star	The Batman	Nominated	
Primetime Emmy Award	2025	Outstanding Guest Actress in a Comedy Series	The Studio (episode: "The Presentation")	Nominated	
San Diego Film Critics Society	2024	Best First Feature (Director)	Blink Twice	Won	
Satellite Awards	2021	Best Actress in a Musical or Comedy Series	High Fidelity	Nominated	
Saturn Awards	2022	Best Actress	The Batman	Nominated	
Scream Awards	2011	Breakout Performance – Female	X-Men: First Class	Nominated	
Screen Actors Guild Awards	2019	Outstanding Ensemble in a Drama Series	Big Little Lies	Nominated	
Teen Choice Awards	2011	Choice Movie Breakout: Female	X-Men: First Class	Nominated	
Teen Choice Awards	2011	Choice Movie Chemistry	X-Men: First Class	Nominated	

== Discography ==
Studio albums
Title	Details
Calm Down	Released: October 21, 2014; Label: Innit Recordings; Formats: CD, digital download, LP
Tenderness	Released: July 3, 2020; Label: Innit Recordings; Format: Digital download

EPs
Title	Details
Lolawolf (EP)	Released: February 4, 2014; Label: Innit Recordings; Formats: Digital download
Everyfuckinday (EP)	Released: June 23, 2015; Label: Innit Recordings; Formats: Digital download

Singles
Title	Year	Album
"Drive (Los Angeles)"	2013	Lolawolf
"Wanna Have Fun"	2013	Lolawolf
"Jimmy Franco"	2014	Calm Down
"Summertime"	2014	—N/a
"AYO"	2014	Calm Down
"Every Fuckin Day"	2015	Every Fuckin Day
"Teardrop"	2016	—N/a
"Baby I'm Dyin'"	2017	—N/a
"Not Diana"	2020	Tenderness

Guest appearances
Title	Year	Artist(s)	Album
"We Are The Ones"	2008	will.i.am	—N/a
"Passionfruit"	2017	Drake	More Life
"Screwed"	2018	Janelle Monáe	Dirty Computer
"Anti-Social Smokers Club"	2018	Slim Jxmmi	SR3MM
"Lavender Haze"	2022	Taylor Swift	Midnights
"Glitch"	2022	Taylor Swift	Midnights

Soundtrack appearances
Title	Year	Album
"Don't"	2017	Big Little Lies (Music From the HBO Limited Series)

Songwriting credits
Title	Artist(s)	Year	Album	Co-writers
"Lavender Haze"	Taylor Swift	2022	Midnights	Taylor Swift, Jack Antonoff, Mark Anthony Spears, Jahaan Sweet, Sam Dew
