= Fantastic Beasts and Where to Find Them (film) =

2016 film by David Yates

- Theatrical release poster
- Directed by: David Yates
- Written by: J. K. Rowling
- Produced by: David Heyman; J. K. Rowling; Steve Kloves; Lionel Wigram
- Starring: Eddie Redmayne; Katherine Waterston; Dan Fogler; Alison Sudol; Ezra Miller; Samantha Morton; Jon Voight; Carmen Ejogo; Colin Farrell
- Cinematography: Philippe Rousselot
- Edited by: Mark Day
- Music by: James Newton Howard
- Production companies: Warner Bros. Pictures; Heyday Films
- Distributed by: Warner Bros. Pictures
- Release dates: 10 November 2016 (Alice Tully Hall); 18 November 2016 (United Kingdom and United States)
- Running time: 133 minutes
- Countries: United Kingdom; United States
- Language: English
- Budget: $175–200 million
- Box office: $814 million

Fantastic Beasts and Where to Find Them is a 2016 fantasy film directed by David Yates and written by J. K. Rowling in her debut as a screenwriter. It is the first instalment in the Fantastic Beasts film series and the ninth overall in the Wizarding World franchise, serving as a spin-off of and prequel to the Harry Potter film series. Newt Scamander's guide book of the same name—written by Rowling under the pen name in 2001 for the charity Comic Relief—inspired the film. It features an ensemble cast including Eddie Redmayne, Katherine Waterston, Dan Fogler, Alison Sudol, Ezra Miller, Samantha Morton, Jon Voight, Carmen Ejogo, Ron Perlman and Colin Farrell.

A new Wizarding World film series was first announced in September 2013, two years after the final Harry Potter film—Harry Potter and the Deathly Hallows – Part 2—was released. The following month, it was also announced that producer David Heyman and writer Steve Kloves, who were both Potter film franchise veterans, will return in the new film series. In August 2014, Warner Bros. announced that Yates would direct at least one film of the planned trilogy, after rumors in which Alfonso Cuarón would direct, of which he refuted three months earlier. Filming took place from August 2015 to January 2016, at Warner Bros. Studios Leavesden, and also on location in England.

Fantastic Beasts and Where to Find Them premiered at Alice Tully Hall in New York City on 10 November 2016, and was released in theatres in the United States and in the United Kingdom on 18 November, by Warner Bros. Pictures. The film received generally positive reviews from critics and emerged a commercial success, grossing $814 million worldwide, finishing its theatrical run as the eighth-highest-grossing film of 2016. It received five nominations at the 70th British Academy Film Awards, including Best British Film, and won for Best Production Design. The film was also nominated for two awards at the 89th Academy Awards and won for Best Costume Design, becoming the first Wizarding World film to win an Academy Award. Two sequels—Fantastic Beasts: The Crimes of Grindelwald (2018) and Fantastic Beasts: The Secrets of Dumbledore (2022)—have been released.

== Plot ==
In 1926, British wizard and "magizoologist" Newt Scamander arrives in New York City. He observes Mary Lou Barebone, the non-magical ("No-Maj" or "Muggle") head of the New Salem Philanthropic Society, preaching that witches and wizards are real and dangerous. Attempting to recapture a Niffler that escapes from his suitcase of magical creatures, Newt bumps into No-Maj Jacob Kowalski, an aspiring baker, and unwittingly swaps suitcases. Porpentina "Tina" Goldstein, a demoted Auror of the Magical Congress of the United States (MACUSA), spots the Niffler and arrests Newt for breaking magical law. Since the suitcase is Jacob’s which contains his baked goods, Newt is released. At home, Jacob opens Newt's suitcase, inadvertently freeing several creatures into the city, and is bitten by one.

Tina and Newt follow a trail of wreckage and track down an ill Jacob and the case. To cure Jacob, Tina takes them both to her apartment and introduces them to Queenie, her Legilimens sister. Jacob and Queenie are mutually attracted, though it is illegal for wizards and witches to have any social relationship with No-Majs in America. To cure Jacob, Newt takes him inside his magically expanded suitcase, which houses various creatures, including an Obscurial of a deceased girl, a parasite that develops inside magically gifted children when their abilities are suppressed; those afflicted rarely live past the age of 10.

After Newt and Jacob recapture two of the four escaped beasts, Tina grabs and returns the suitcase to MACUSA, but all three are arrested. Officials believe the Obscurial in Newt's case is responsible for the spate of destruction, including the killing of Senator Henry Shaw Jr., when instead the destruction was caused by a second Obscurial already in the city. The Director of Magical Security, Percival Graves, accuses Newt of conspiring with the infamous dark wizard Gellert Grindelwald, and decides to destroy Newt's case and its contents, and obliviate Jacob's recent memories. Newt and Tina are sentenced to death. Upon sensing this, Queenie rescues Jacob and helps Newt and Tina escape and retrieve the case before the sentences can be carried out. Later, in a speakeasy dive bar, a tip from Tina's goblin informant Gnarlak leads the four to recapture the last two escaped creatures.

Graves approaches Credence, Mary Lou's adult adopted son, offering to free him from his abusive mother in exchange for helping to find the destructive Obscurial. Credence finds a wand under his younger adopted sister Modesty's bed. Mary Lou assumes it is his, but just as Credence is to be punished, the Obscurial kills Mary Lou and her elder adopted daughter, Chastity. Assuming Modesty is the Obscurial's host, Graves dismisses Credence as a squib reneging on his promise to teach him magic in return for service. Credence reveals he is the real host, having survived to maturity due to the intensity of his magic, and openly attacks the city.

Newt finds Credence hiding in a subway tunnel and tries to persuade him to come with him, but Graves attacks him. Tina, who had tried to protect Credence from Mary Lou (which action had led to her demotion), attempts to calm the boy, while Graves tries to convince Credence to join him. As Credence returns to human form, MACUSA President Seraphina Picquery and the Aurors enter to counterattack, shattering the Obscurial to nothing in a barrage of magical blasts. Graves claims MACUSA's laws openly protect No-Majs at the expense of the magical community, and declares that he no longer cares to live in hiding. He confesses his plan to unleash the Obscurial and expose the magical community to No-Majs and frame Newt with his case of creatures for this. Picquery orders the Aurors to apprehend Graves, but he defeats them. Newt captures him with the help of one of his beasts and reveals Graves as Grindelwald in disguise, who is then arrested.

Picquery laments that the destruction to the city is too extensive to keep their world secret anymore, but Newt releases his Thunderbird to disperse an extract in the form of rain that wipes recent bad memories across the city. During this, MACUSA wizards and witches - who are immune to the extract - repair the destruction and erase all traces of their existence. Queenie kisses Jacob goodbye as the rain seemingly erases his memories too. Before returning to Britain, Newt secretly gives Jacob his occamy silver eggshells, which Jacob uses as capital to open a bakery business. His business thrives, with unique baked goods crafted to resemble Newt's magical beasts. When Queenie enters his shop, he smiles at her, his memory revealed to have just been suppressed by her now reawakening.

== Cast ==
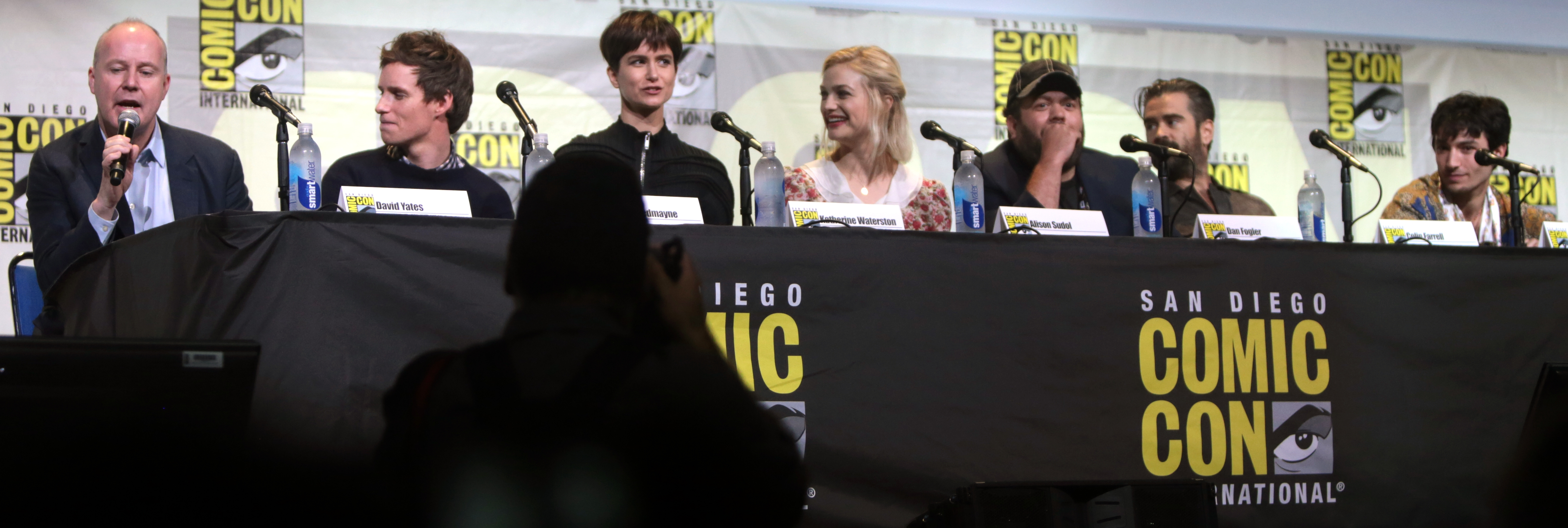
Fantastic Beasts and Where to Find Them panel at the 2016 San Diego Comic-Con (left to right): director Yates; actors Redmayne, Waterston, Sudol, Fogler, Farrell, Miller.

- Eddie Redmayne as Newt Scamander
  An introverted British wizard, magizoologist and a former employee of the Ministry of Magic. Scamander is the future author of the Hogwarts School of Witchcraft and Wizardry standard textbook Fantastic Beasts and Where to Find Them. Redmayne, who was a fan of the series, was cast in June 2015. Nicholas Hoult was also considered for the role before Redmayne was cast.
- Katherine Waterston as Tina Goldstein
  A grounded, down-to-earth witch and one-time Auror employed by MACUSA. She longs to fight for what is right, but was demoted to a position well below her skill level.
- Dan Fogler as Jacob Kowalski
  A genial Muggle cannery worker and aspiring baker who is exposed to the New York City magical community after he and Newt accidentally switch suitcases. Before Fogler was cast, Michael Cera was in talks to play the role, but later passed on it to voice Robin in The Lego Batman Movie. In a 2025 interview, Cera said he turned it down due to a fear of him getting "too famous".
- Alison Sudol as Queenie Goldstein
  Tina's younger sister and roommate. Described as a free-spirited, big-hearted bombshell, she is a naturally born and skilled Legilimens.
- Samantha Morton as Mary Lou Barebone
  A narrow-minded No-Maj and the sinister leader of the New Salem Philanthropic Society or "The Second-Salemers", a group whose goals include exposing and killing wizards and witches.
- Ezra Miller as Credence Barebone
  A secret Obscurial wizard and Mary Lou's troubled adopted son.
- Jon Voight as Henry Shaw Snr
  A newspaper owner and the father of U.S. Senator Henry Shaw Jnr and Langdon Shaw.
- Carmen Ejogo as Seraphina Picquery
  The President of MACUSA, the Magical Congress of the United States of America. As such, she is the American equivalent of the British Minister for Magic.
- Colin Farrell as Percival Graves
  A high-ranking auror and Director of Magical Security for MACUSA, responsible for the protection of witches and wizards. Since Grindelwald spends most of the first film disguised as Graves, Colin Farrell portrays him in those scenes.
- Ron Perlman as the voice of Gnarlak
  A goblin gangster who runs a magical speakeasy dive bar nightclub called "The Blind Pig".
- Faith Wood-Blagrove as Modesty Barebone
  A haunted young girl who is the youngest of Mary Lou's adopted children. Wood-Blagrove was chosen from among thousands of children who auditioned in an open casting call.
- Ronan Raftery as Langdon Shaw
  The younger of Henry Shaw Snr's sons, who begins to believe in magic.
- Josh Cowdery as Henry Shaw Jnr
  The elder of Henry Shaw Snr's sons; an arrogant and cruel U.S. Senator.
- Kevin Guthrie as Abernathy
  Tina and Queenie's MACUSA supervisor.
- Jenn Murray as Chastity Barebone
  The middle of Mary Lou's adopted children.
- Gemma Chan as Madam Ya Zhou
  The Chinese ambassador witch to MACUSA.
- Johnny Depp as Gellert Grindelwald
  An infamous, powerful dark wizard who believes in the superiority of wizards and seeks to lead a new Wizarding Order.

Zoë Kravitz appears in a photograph as Leta Lestrange, Newt's former love who betrayed his trust, to set up her role in the sequel Fantastic Beasts: The Crimes of Grindelwald (2018).

== Production ==
=== Development ===
Fantastic Beasts and Where to Find Them is mentioned several times as a school textbook in the Harry Potter book series, with Scamander named as the author. In 2001, Rowling published an edition of the "textbook" to be sold to raise money for the British charity Comic Relief. The book is a directory of magical creatures with an introduction by its author, Newt Scamander. It does not contain a narrative.

First announced in September 2013 just two years after the release of Harry Potter and the Deathly Hallows – Part 2, the Fantastic Beasts project marked Rowling's debut as a screenwriter. The film sees the return of producer David Heyman, as well as writer Steve Kloves, both veterans of the Potter film franchise. There were rumors that Alfonso Cuarón would direct, which he refuted in May 2014. Warner Bros. announced that David Yates would direct at least the first instalment of a planned trilogy. James Newton Howard was brought on board to score the film.

=== Filming ===
Principal photography began on 17 August 2015, at Warner Bros. Studios, Leavesden, in Hertfordshire, England and wrapped in January 2016. Several scenes were shot on location in London. After two months, the production moved to the Cunard Building and St George's Hall in Liverpool, which was transformed into 1920s New York City. Framestore in London produced the visual effects for the film.

=== Music ===
On 9 April 2016, the film's website announced that James Newton Howard would write and compose the score. On 24 October 2016, Pottermore published an official first look at the film's main theme composed by Howard. The main theme incorporated John Williams' themes from the Harry Potter films, such as "Hedwig's Theme". The soundtrack was released by WaterTower Music on 18 November 2016, coinciding with the film's release worldwide.

=== Visual effects ===
The visual effects were provided by Cinesite, DNEG, Framestore, Image Engine, Moving Picture Company, Milk VFX and Rodeo FX.

== Marketing ==
On 4 November 2015, Entertainment Weekly released the first official publicity shots of the film, including pictures of characters Newt, Tina and Queenie, and behind-the-scenes shots of production and filming on various sets designed to mirror 1920s New York City. On 10 December 2015, @Fantastic Beasts announced on Twitter that an "announcement trailer" would be released on 15 December. A teaser poster was also released along with the one-minute trailer.

During "A Celebration of Harry Potter" at Universal Orlando Resort in February 2016, a featurette was released showcasing several interviews with various cast and crew members, as well as the first official behind-the-scenes footage. On 10 April 2016, the first "teaser trailer" was released during the MTV Movie Awards. On 10 August 2016, more information and publicity shots for the film were released through Entertainment Weekly, with new information on Ezra Miller's character, Credence Barebone, and the news that Zoë Kravitz would have a role in the series. New images released at the time include the quartet running down a New York City alleyway; David Yates chatting to stars Katherine Waterston and Eddie Redmayne on the set in front of a blown out subway station; Colin Farrell's character, Percival Graves, interrogating an arrested and handcuffed Newt; and Graves and Credence putting up anti-magic propaganda. A final trailer for the film was released on 28 September 2016.

=== Tie-in literature and merchandise ===
The film's script was published in book form on 18 November 2016. Fantastic Beasts and Where to Find Them: The Original Screenplay was written by Rowling herself.

On 7 March 2016, a trailer-preview was released about the History of Magic in North America as it is in the Harry Potter universe. On 7 October 2016, Rowling also released on Pottermore four pieces of writing exclusively as an introduction to the film Fantastic Beasts and Where to Find Them, titled History of Magic in North America. It includes information about scourers in North America, brutal and violent magical mercenaries who played a significant role in the historic Salem witch trials of the 1600s; info about various American wand makers; the role magic played in World War I; the foundation of MACUSA; the harsh enforcement No-Maj/Wizarding segregation; and life in 1920s Wizarding America; with info about wand permits and prohibition; and her fictionalized ideas of "Native American Magic."

On 28 June 2016, Rowling released a second part to her History of Magic in North America series, concerning the fictitious Ilvermorny School of Witchcraft and Wizardry, detailing the founding of the pre-eminent American Wizarding academy and allowing users to sort themselves into one of the four houses of the school. The school itself is mentioned in the film.

A "story pack" based on Fantastic Beasts and Where to Find Them was released for the video game Lego Dimensions by WB Games and TT Games. The pack includes a constructible model of MACUSA, figures of Newt Scamander and a Niffler, and a six-level game campaign adapted from the film's events. The pack was released on the same day as the film, alongside a "fun pack" containing figures of Tina Goldstein and a Swooping Evil. The cast of the film reprises their roles in the game.

== Release ==
=== Theatrical ===
Fantastic Beasts and Where to Find Them had its world premiere at Alice Tully Hall in New York City on 10 November 2016 and was released worldwide on 18 November 2016.

=== Home media ===
Fantastic Beasts and Where to Find Them was released on Digital HD on 7 March 2017, and on 4K UHD, 3D Blu-ray, Blu-ray and DVD on 28 March 2017.

== Reception ==
=== Box office ===
Fantastic Beasts and Where to Find Them grossed $234 million in the United States and Canada and $580 million in other countries for a total of $814 million. The film was made on a budget of $175 million, with an additional $150 million spent on marketing. Worldwide, the film grossed $219.9 million during its opening weekend in around 64 markets on 24,200 screens, both the fifth biggest in Rowling's wizarding cinematic universe, and the seventh biggest for the month of November 2016. IMAX totalled $15 million from 605 screens. Deadline Hollywood calculated the net profit of the film to be $164 million, when factoring together all expenses and revenues for the film, making it the ninth-most profitable release of 2016.

==== United Kingdom and Ireland ====
Fantastic Beasts and Where to Find Them went on general release in the United Kingdom and Ireland on 18 November 2016. It debuted with £15.33 million ($19.15 million) from 666 cinemas, the biggest debut of any film in 2016, ahead of the previous record holder, Batman v Superman: Dawn of Justice (£14.62 million). The film vied with Bridget Jones' Baby and briefly won first place, only to be surpassed during the last days of 2016 by Rogue One: A Star Wars Story.

==== United States and Canada ====
In the United States and Canada, estimates predicted that the film would gross $68–85 million—or more—in its opening weekend. The film was released on 18 November in 4,143 cinemas, of which 388 were IMAX screens, and more than 3,600 were showing the film in 3D. It grossed $29.7 million on its first day, the second-lowest opening day among Rowling's adaptations (behind the $29.6 million Friday of Harry Potter and the Chamber of Secrets). This included $8.75 million it earned from Thursday-night preview screenings beginning at 6 p.m. in 3,700 cinemas. In total, the film earned $74.4 million in its opening weekend, falling in line with projections and finishing first at the box office, but it recorded the lowest opening among films in Rowling's Harry Potter universe. It made $8 million from 388 IMAX screens, $9 million from 500 premium large-format locations and $1.75 million from Cinemark XD.

The film's opening was considered a hit, taking into account the fact that the story was not based on an existing, popular source, and the film itself was missing the franchise's main character, Harry Potter. It was the top choice among moviegoers, representing 47% of the weekend's total $157.6 million tickets sales. On its second Friday, it had a gradual drop of 37% ($18.5 million) from the week before, the second-best Friday drop for any Harry Potter film, behind The Philosopher's Stone. This was in part due to Black Friday, the most lucrative day of the Thanksgiving Day stretch. It ended up grossing $45.1 million in its second weekend (a drop of just 39.4%), finishing 2nd at the box office behind newcomer Moana.

==== Other markets ====
Outside North America, the film debuted day-and-date in 63 countries, along with its North American release, where it was projected to gross $90–125 million in its opening weekend. It opened 16 November 2016 in 9 countries, earning $6.9 million from 5,070 screens. It opened in 38 more countries on 18 November, earning $16.6 million for a total of $23.5 million in two days. In three days, it made $53.6 million. Through Sunday, 20 November, the film had a five-day opening weekend of $145.5 million from 63 countries, above the initial projections. It earned another $132 million in its second weekend after a large debut in China and Japan.

It recorded the biggest opening day of all time among the Harry Potter franchise in South Korea ($1.7 million), the Philippines ($1.2 million), the UAE ($429,000) and Ukraine, the second biggest in Mexico ($1.8 million), Russia and the CIS ($1.7 million), Brazil ($1.3 million) and in Indonesia ($480,000), all behind Harry Potter and the Deathly Hallows – Part 2 and the third biggest in the United Kingdom ($5.4 million), behind Part 1 and Part 2. It also scored the second-biggest Warner Bros. opening of all time in the Czech Republic and Slovakia. Notably, France opened with $1.8 million, Spain with $1.4 million, and Germany with $1 million ($2 million including paid previews). In terms of opening weekends, the film posted the biggest opening among the Harry Potter franchise in 16 markets, including South Korea ($14.2 million, also the third-biggest opening for the studio), Russia ($9.8 million) and Brazil ($6.4 million), the biggest opener of the year in Germany ($10.2 million), Sweden, Belgium and Switzerland and the biggest Warner Bros. debut in those along with France ($10.2 million), the Netherlands and Denmark. Italy debuted with $6.6 million, the biggest for a U.S. film in the country. Australia opened with $7.4 million, followed by Mexico ($5.8 million) and Spain ($4.5 million).

It opened in China on 25 November alongside Disney's animated Moana but did not face significant competition from it. It earned $11.2 million on its opening day from 11,600 screens, the best among the Rowlings cinematic universe. In total, it had an opening weekend of $41.1 million, dominating 60% of the top five films with 70,000 screenings per day. This alone surpassed the entire lifetime total of all Harry Potter films save the last one. Similarly in Japan—typically the biggest or second biggest market for the previous Harry Potter films—it debuted with $15.5 million, besting the total lifetime of all the previous films except for Harry Potter and the Half-Blood Prince and Deathly Hallows – Part 2.

The film also set a number of IMAX records. In total, the opening weekend was worth $7 million from 276 screens, which is the second-highest ever in the Wizarding World, behind Deathly Hallows – Part 2. In 33 territories, it opened at number one, and was also the third-highest-grossing November international IMAX opening ever, and the No. 1 start for IMAX in November in 19 countries including Japan ($1.1 million), the UK, Russia, Germany and the Netherlands. In China, it had the biggest IMAX opening among the franchise with $5.1 million from 347 IMAX screens. Overall, the film has earned a global cumulative total of $19.1 million from the format.

It has become the highest-grossing film in Rowling's cinematic universe in Russia ($16.7 million) and the second-highest in South Korea ($24.6 million). China ($41.1 million) the United Kingdom ($37.6 million), followed by Germany ($18.4 million), France ($16.7 million) and Spain ($13.3 million) are the film's biggest-earning markets.

=== Critical response ===
On the review aggregation website Rotten Tomatoes the film holds a rating of 74% based on 347 reviews, with an average rating of 6.8/10. The website's critical consensus reads, "Fantastic Beasts and Where to Find Them draws on Harry Potter's rich mythology to deliver a spin-off that dazzles with franchise-building magic all its own." On Metacritic, the film has a weighted average score 66 out of 100, based on reviews from 50 critics, indicating "generally favorable" reviews. Audiences polled by CinemaScore gave the film an average grade of "A" on an A+ to F scale, while PostTrak reported filmgoers gave it a 90% positive score and a 74% "definite recommend".

Peter Bradshaw of The Guardian gave the film five out of five stars, hailing it as "a rich, baroque, intricately detailed entertainment" and a "terrifically good-natured, unpretentious and irresistibly buoyant film". NME's Larry Bartleet also gave it five out of five, calling it "more enchanting to your inner kid than the Potter films ever were". Robbie Collin of The Telegraph called the film a "spectacular feat of world-building" and said "The film is immaculately cast, and the chemistry between its four heroes holds your eye with its firework fizz." IndieWire's Eric Kohn gave the film a B+ saying that it "delivers the most satisfying period fantasy since Tim Burton's Sweeney Todd: The Demon Barber of Fleet Street ", and that its layers of sophistication made it one of the best Hollywood blockbusters of the year. Peter Travers of Rolling Stone gave the film 3 out of 4 and expressed surprise at the analogies underlying the film, calling it "the first anti-Trump blockbuster". He calls Rowling "a champion of outsiders facing intolerance, segregation and demonization" and that although the film gets bogged down in exposition, the unexpectedly moving subtext carries the day. Travers concludes "The real stars here are the beasts, supposedly ugly, weird and dangerous, but paragons of FX creativity in service of genuine ideas."

Mike Ryan of Uproxx gave the film a positive review, writing "Newt Scamander is nothing like Harry, but it has to be this way. It all has to be different. And it is, but, again, with just enough 'sameness' to make us feel like we are at home again. I'm looking forward to wherever these movies are taking us". John DeFore of The Hollywood Reporter wrote that the film is "likely to draw in just about everyone who followed the Potter series and to please most of them". In a mixed review, Ignatiy Vishnevetsky of The A.V. Club found the film "patchy but occasionally charming." David Edelstein of New York Magazine called it a "distinctly unmagical slog", remarking that the beasts "aren't especially fantastic and the effects are too blandly corporate to be exhilarating".

=== Accolades ===
The film was nominated for two Academy Awards and won for Best Costume Design, becoming the first Wizarding World film to win an Academy Award. It was also nominated for five British Academy Film Awards, including Best British Film, and won for Best Production Design.

Award	Date of ceremony	Category	Recipient(s)	Result	Ref.
Academy Awards	26 February 2017	Best Costume Design	Colleen Atwood	Won	
Academy Awards	26 February 2017	Best Production Design	Stuart Craig and Anna Pinnock	Nominated	
Art Directors Guild Awards	11 February 2017	Excellence in Production Design for a Fantasy Film	Stuart Craig	Nominated	
British Academy Film Awards	12 February 2017	Best British Film	David Heyman, Steve Kloves, J. K. Rowling, Lionel Wigram and David Yates	Nominated	
British Academy Film Awards	12 February 2017	Best Production Design	Stuart Craig and Anna Pinnock	Won	
British Academy Film Awards	12 February 2017	Best Costume Design	Colleen Atwood	Nominated	
British Academy Film Awards	12 February 2017	Best Special Visual Effects	Tim Burke, Pablo Grillo, Christian Manz and David Watkins	Nominated	
British Academy Film Awards	12 February 2017	Best Sound	Niv Adiri, Glenn Freemantle, Simon Hayes, Andy Nelson and Ian Tapp	Nominated	
Casting Society of America	19 January 2017	Feature Big Budget – Drama	Fiona Weir and Jim Carnahan	Nominated	
Costume Designers Guild Awards	21 February 2017	Excellence in Fantasy Film	Colleen Atwood	Nominated	
Critics' Choice Movie Awards	11 December 2016	Best Art Direction	Stuart Craig, James Hambidge and Anna Pinnock	Nominated	
Critics' Choice Movie Awards	11 December 2016	Best Costume Design	Colleen Atwood	Nominated	
Critics' Choice Movie Awards	11 December 2016	Best Hair and Makeup	Fantastic Beasts and Where to Find Them	Nominated	
Critics' Choice Movie Awards	11 December 2016	Best Visual Effects	Fantastic Beasts and Where to Find Them	Nominated	
Diversity in Media Awards	15 September 2017	Movie of the Year	Fantastic Beasts and Where to Find Them	Nominated	
Empire Awards	19 March 2017	Best British Film	Fantastic Beasts and Where to Find Them	Nominated	
Empire Awards	19 March 2017	Best Actor	Eddie Redmayne	Won	
Empire Awards	19 March 2017	Best Costume Design	Fantastic Beasts and Where to Find Them	Won	
Empire Awards	19 March 2017	Best Make-Up and Hairstyling	Fantastic Beasts and Where to Find Them	Won	
Empire Awards	19 March 2017	Best Production Design	Fantastic Beasts and Where to Find Them	Won	
Empire Awards	19 March 2017	Best Visual Effects	Fantastic Beasts and Where to Find Them	Nominated	
Evening Standard British Film Awards	9 December 2016	Editor's Award	Fantastic Beasts and Where to Find Them	Won	
Irish Film & Television Awards	8 April 2017	Best Supporting Actor	Colin Farrell	Nominated	
Make-Up Artists & Hair Stylists Guild Awards	19 February 2017	Feature-Length Motion Picture – Best Period and/or Character Make-Up	Fae Hammond and Marilyn MacDonald	Nominated	
Make-Up Artists & Hair Stylists Guild Awards	19 February 2017	Feature-Length Motion Picture – Best Period and/or Character Hair Styling	Fae Hammond and Marilyn MacDonald	Nominated	
Make-Up Artists & Hair Stylists Guild Awards	19 February 2017	Feature-Length Motion Picture – Best Special Make-Up Effects	Fae Hammond	Nominated	
People's Choice Awards	18 January 2017	Favorite Year-End Blockbuster	Fantastic Beasts and Where to Find Them	Won	
Saturn Awards	28 June 2017	Best Fantasy Film	Fantastic Beasts and Where to Find Them	Nominated	
Saturn Awards	28 June 2017	Best Supporting Actor	Dan Fogler	Nominated	
Saturn Awards	28 June 2017	Best Music	James Newton Howard	Nominated	
Saturn Awards	28 June 2017	Best Production Design	Stuart Craig	Nominated	
Saturn Awards	28 June 2017	Best Costume Design	Colleen Atwood	Won	
Saturn Awards	28 June 2017	Best Make-up	Nick Knowles	Nominated	
Saturn Awards	28 June 2017	Best Special Effects	Tim Burke, Christian Manz and David Watkins	Nominated	
St. Louis Gateway Film Critics Association	18 December 2016	Best Production Design	Stuart Craig and James Hambidge	Runner-up (Note: Tied with Jean Rabasse for Jackie and David Wasco for La La Land)	
Teen Choice Awards	31 July 2016	Choice AnTEENcipated Movie	Fantastic Beasts and Where to Find Them	Nominated	
Visual Effects Society Awards	7 February 2017	Outstanding Visual Effects in a Photoreal Feature	Tim Burke, Pablo Grillo, Christian Manz, David Watkins and Olly Young	Nominated	
Visual Effects Society Awards	7 February 2017	Outstanding Animated Performance in a Photoreal Feature	Gabriel Beauvais-Tremblay, Luc Girard, Laurent Laban and Romain Rico	Nominated	
Washington D.C. Area Film Critics Association	5 December 2016	Best Art Direction	Stuart Craig and Anna Pinnock	Nominated	

== Sequels ==
Initially, in October 2014, the studio announced the film would be the start of a trilogy. In July 2016, David Yates confirmed that Rowling had written the screenplay for the second film and had ideas for the third. In October 2016, Rowling announced that the series would comprise five films.

The first sequel, Fantastic Beasts: The Crimes of Grindelwald, was released on 16 November 2018. The second sequel, Fantastic Beasts: The Secrets of Dumbledore, was released in the United Kingdom on 8 April 2022 and in the United States on 15 April 2022.

== See also ==
- List of films about witchcraft

== Literature ==
- Rowling, J. K. (2016). Fantastic Beasts and Where to Find Them: The Original Screenplay. New York: Arthur A. Levine Books. ISBN 978-0-325-40112-6.
