= List of Wizarding World cast members =

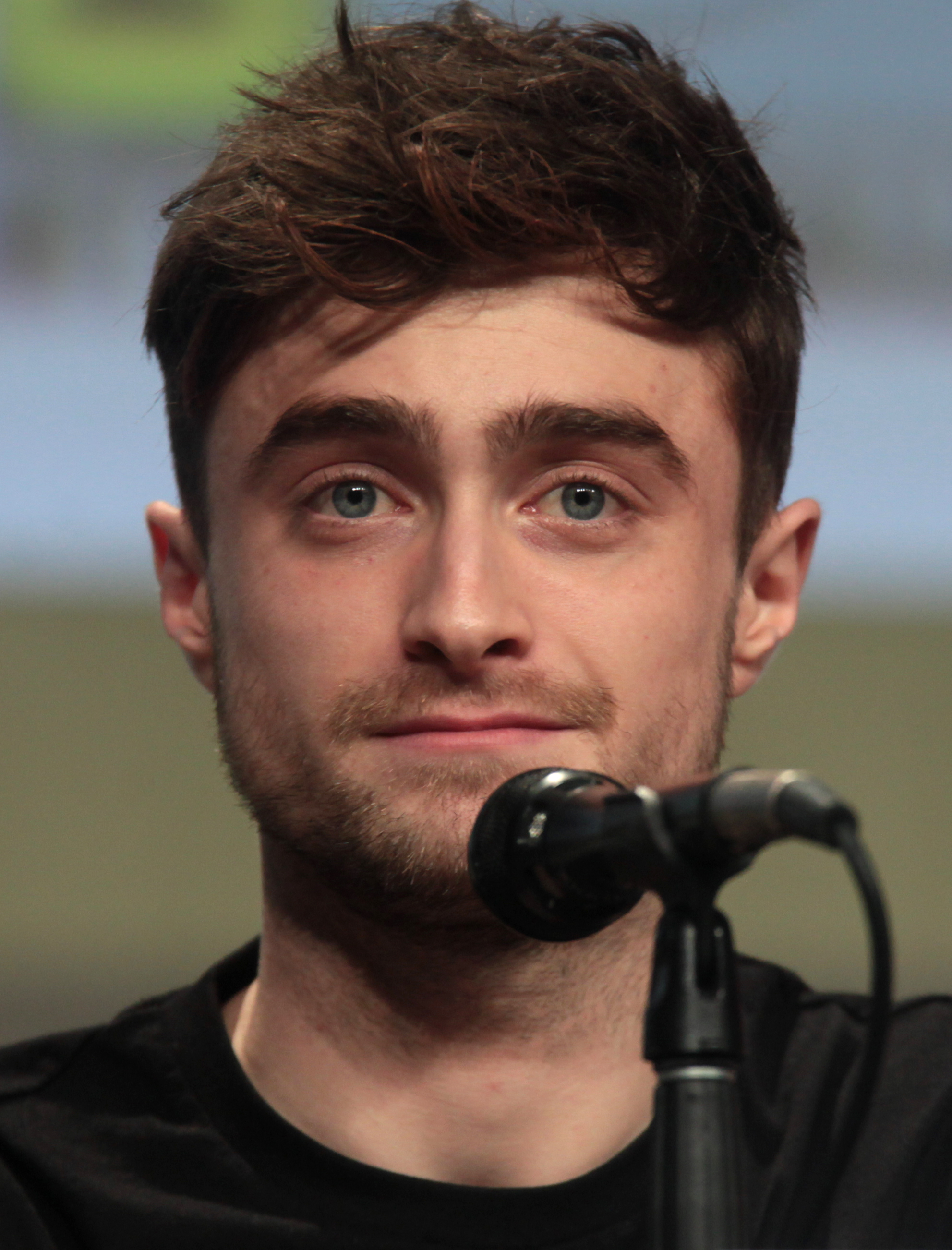
Daniel Radcliffe portrayed Harry Potter in the film series.

The Wizarding World is a fantasy media franchise and shared fictional universe centred on the Harry Potter novel series by J. K. Rowling. It consists of two film series produced by Warner Bros. Pictures: Harry Potter (2001–2011) and Fantastic Beasts (2016–2022). The Audible audiobook series was released in 2025–2026. The Harry Potter television series developed for HBO is scheduled to premiere in 2026.

== Cast and characters ==
List indicators

This section includes characters who will appear or have appeared in Wizarding World media.

- An empty grey cell indicates the character was not in the media, or that the character's official presence has not yet been confirmed.
- ^{E} indicates an appearance not included in the theatrical cut.
- ^{V} indicates a voice-only role.
- ^{Y} indicates a younger version of the character.

Character	Harry Potter film series (2001–2011)	Fantastic Beasts film series (2016–2022)	Harry Potter Audible audiobook series (2025–2026)	Harry Potter TV series (2026)
=== Introduced in Harry Potter book series ===
Hannah Abbott	Charlotte Skeoch		Tiffany Banyong	India Moon
Aged witch	Jenny Tarren		Claire Morgan	
Aragog	Julian Glover^{V}		Philip Arditti	
Avery			David Ahmad	
Archie Aymslowe			Rufus Wright	
Ludo Bagman			Danny Kirrane	
Bathilda Bagshot	Hazel Douglas		Louise Jameson	
Bald Man			Tom Alexander	
Bane			Carl Prekopp	
Heathcote Barbary	Jason Buckle			
Basil			Damian Lynch	
Basilisk			Ewan Bailey	
Marcus Belby	Robert Knox		Richard Stranks	
Katie Bell	Emily Dale; Georgina Leonidas		Scarlett May-Carter	Eire Farrell
Cuthbert Binns			David Troughton	Richard Durden
Phineas Nigellus Black			Jon Furlong	
Regulus Black	Tom Moorcroft		Mitchell Zhangazha	
Sirius Black	Gary Oldman; James Walters^{Y} Rohan Gotobed^{Y}		Sope Dirisu; Anthony J. Abraham^{Y} Dylan Trigger^{Y}	
Walburga Black			Kiran Landa	
Miles Bletchley			Sam Stafford	Eddison Burch
The Bloody Baron	Terence Bayler			Andrew Brooke
Bob			Nicholas Boulton	
Broderick Bode			David Ahmad	
Bogrod	Jon Key		Nicholas Boulton	
Lucian Bole				James Dowell
Amelia Bones	Sian Thomas		Josie Walker	
Susan Bones	Eleanor Columbus		Maiya Silveston	Jazmyn Lewin
Terry Boot			Huey Wynn-Jones	Aaron Zhao
Mr Borgin	Edward Tudor-Pole^{E}		David Ahmad	
Bozo			Carl Prekopp	
Betty Braithwaite			Laurence Bouvard	
Lavender Brown	Kathleen Cauley; Jennifer Smith; Jessie Cave		Ruby-May Martinwood	Sienna Moosah
Frank Bryce	Eric Sykes		Gene Foad	
Charity Burbage	Carolyn Pickles		Rachel Atkins	
Caractacus Burke			Philip Arditti	
Sir Cadogan	Paul Whitehouse		Matt Berry	
Alecto Carrow	Suzie Toase		Lizzie Stables	
Amycus Carrow	Ralph Ineson		Adam Samuel-Bal	
Mary Cattermole	Kate Fleetwood		Danusia Samal	
Reginald Cattermole	Steffan Rhodri		David Holt	
Cecilia			Tia Bannon	
Cho Chang	Katie Leung		Lisa He	
Penelope Clearwater			Scarlett May-Carter	Scarlett Archer
Mrs. Cole	Amelda Brown		Margaret Cabourn-Smith	
Michael Corner			Archie Phillips	
Cousin Barny			Will Howard	
Vincent Crabbe	Jamie Waylett		Dougie Brownwood; Jeremiah Daley	Finn Stephens
Crabbe Sr.			Andrew James Spooner	
Dirk Cresswell			Sule Rimi	
Colin Creevey	Hugh Mitchell		Bertie Caplan; Max Barratt	Jasper Ambrose
Denis Creevey			Sam Budibent	
Doris Crockford			Tia Bannon	
Barty Crouch Jr	David Tennant		Michael Ahomka-Lindsay	
Barty Crouch Sr	Roger Lloyd-Pack		Hugh Quarshie	
Gideon Crumb	Steven Claydon			
Roger Davies	Henry Lloyd-Hughes		Archie Phillips	
John Dawlish	Richard Leaf		Ewan Bailey	
Apolline Delacour			Amira Ghazalla	
Fleur Delacour	Clémence Poésy		Tara Salma	
Gabrielle Delacour	Angelica Mandy			
Monsieur Delacour			Rufus Wright	
Sir Patrick Delaney-Podmore			Ian Conningham	
Peregrine Derrick				Henry Medhurst
Dilys Derwent			Margaret Cabourn-Smith	
Dedalus Diggle	David Brett		Andrew James Spooner	
Amos Diggory	Jeff Rawle		Peter Hamilton Dyer	
Cedric Diggory	Robert Pattinson		Ryan Cresswell	
Mrs Diggory			Danusia Samal	
Ivor Dillonsby			Gerard McDermott	
Armando Dippet	Alfred Burke		Gerard McDermott	
Dobby	Toby Jones^{V}		Daniel Mays	Lenny Rush
Elphias Doge	Peter Cartwright; David Ryall		Gene Foad	
Antonin Dolohov			Pete Gold	
Dot			Rachel Atkins	
Kirley Duke	Jonny Greenwood			
Aberforth Dumbledore	Jim McManus; Ciarán Hinds	Richard Coyle	Harry Myers	
Albus Dumbledore	Richard Harris; Michael Gambon; Toby Regbo^{Y}	Jude Law; Toby Regbo^{Y}	Hugh Laurie	John Lithgow
Ariana Dumbledore	Hebe Beardsall			
Dudley Dursley	Harry Melling		Jaiden Dosanjh; Issac Howard	Amos Kitson
Marge Dursley	Pam Ferris		Louise Jameson	
Petunia Dursley	Fiona Shaw; Ariella Paradise^{Y}		Indira Varma; Sophia Jamal^{Y}	Bel Powley
Vernon Dursley	Richard Griffiths		Jeremy Swift	Daniel Rigby
Eric			Sule Rimi	
Everard			Carl Prekopp	
The Fat Friar	Simon Fisher-Becker		Finbar Lynch	Daniel Fearn
The Fat Lady	Elizabeth Spriggs; Dawn French		Sarah Whitehouse	Laura Smyth
Marcus Flint	Jamie Yeates		Aaron Garland	Oliver Croft
Arabella Figg	Kathryn Hunter		Claire Morgan	
Argus Filch	David Bradley		Adeel Akhtar	Paul Whitehouse
Justin Finch-Fletchley	Edward Randell		Samuel Hallybone	James Trevelyan Buckle
Mrs Finnigan			Josie Walker	
Seamus Finnigan	Devon Murray		Lennon Che Doyle; Cameron Hogan	Leo Earley
Nicolas Flamel		Brontis Jodorowsky		Lambert Wilson
Perenelle Flamel				Marthe Keller
Mundungus Fletcher	Andy Linden		Phil Davis	
Filius Flitwick	Warwick Davis		Fergus Rattigan	Warwick Davis
Firenze	Ray Fearon^{V}		Damian Lynch	
Dexter Fortescue			Dan Starkey	
Cornelius Fudge	Robert Hardy		Miles Jupp	Bertie Carvel
Marvolo Gaunt			Finbar Lynch	
Morfin Gaunt			Pete Gold	
Gimlet Eyed Witch			Yasmin Mwanza	
Anthony Goldstein			Richard Stranks	
Gordon			Patrick Davies	
Gregory Goyle	Joshua Herdman		Oscar Hubble; Leonardo Dickens	William Nash
Goyle Sr.			Nicholas Boulton	
Hermione Granger	Emma Watson		Arabella Stanton; Nina Barker-Francis; Saffron Coomber	Arabella Stanton
Hugo Granger-Weasley	Ryan Turner			
Mr Granger	Tom Knight; Ian Kelly			
Mrs Granger	Heather Bleasdale; Michelle Fairley			
Rose Granger-Weasley	Helena Barlow			
Grawp	Tony Maudsley		Finbar Lynch	
Astoria Greengrass	Jade Gordon			
Gregorovitch	Rade Šerbedžija		Branko Tomović	
Fenrir Greyback	Dave Legeno		Chris Jarman	
Gellert Grindelwald	Michael Byrne; Jamie Campbell Bower^{Y}	Johnny Depp; Mads Mikkelsen; Jamie Campbell Bower^{Y}	Gerard McDermott	
Griphook	Verne Troyer; Warwick Davis		Doc Butler	Leigh Gill
Gringotts Spokesgoblin			Nigel Pilkington	
Wilhelmina Grubbly-Plank	Apple Brook		Laurence Bouvard	
Rubeus Hagrid	Robbie Coltrane; Martin Bayfield^{Y}		Mark Addy; Patrick Davies^{Y}	Nick Frost
Harper			Harry Tuffin	
Shrunken Head	Lenny Henry^{V}			
Terence Higgs				Cornelius Brandreth
Hogwarts Express Trolley Witch	Jean Southern; Margery Mason		Margaret Cabourn-Smith	
Hokey			Laurence Bouvard	
Rolanda Hooch	Zoë Wanamaker		Tracy-Ann Oberman	Louise Brealey
Mafalda Hopkirk	Jessica Hynes^{V} Sophie Thompson		Margaret Cabourn-Smith	
Hotel Owner			Laurence Bouvard	
Angelina Johnson	Danielle Tabor; Tiana Benjamin		Marley Rae Hunt	Asha Soetan
Hestia Jones			Lizzie Stables	
Lee Jordan	Luke Youngblood		Joseph Obasohan	Ethan Smith
Bertha Jorkins			Mia Soteriou	
Igor Karkaroff	Predrag Bjelac		Branko Tomović	
Knight at the Deathday Party			Gene Foad	
Kreacher	Timothy Bateson^{V} Simon McBurney^{V}		Mackenzie Crook	
Viktor Krum	Stanislav Ianevski		Daniel Varbanov	
Landlord of the Hanged Man			Carl Prekopp	
Leanne	Isabella Laughland		Grace Hatch	
Bellatrix Lestrange	Helena Bonham Carter		Ruth Wilson	
Gilderoy Lockhart	Kenneth Branagh		Kit Harington	Kit Harington
Alice Longbottom	Lisa Wood			
Augusta Longbottom			Rachel Atkins	
Frank Longbottom	James Payton			
Neville Longbottom	Matthew Lewis		Jake Sigsworth; Archie Mountain	Rory Wilmot
Luna Lovegood	Evanna Lynch		Millie Gubby	
Xenophilius Lovegood	Rhys Ifans		Jamie Demetriou	
Remus Lupin	David Thewlis; James Utechin^{Y}		Iwan Rheon; Richard Stranks^{Y}	
Ernie Macmillan			Harvey Marshall; Reuben Turpy	Cian Eagle-Service
Walden Macnair			Adam Samuel-Bal	
Magorian	Michael Wildman		Mat Fraser	
Malcolm			Austen Phelen	
Draco Malfoy	Tom Felton		Jude Farrant; Maximus Evans	Lox Pratt
Lucius Malfoy	Jason Isaacs		Alex Hassell	Johnny Flynn
Narcissa Malfoy	Helen McCrory		Jessica Henwick	
Scorpius Malfoy	Bertie Gilbert			
Madam Malkin			Celia de Wolff	Naomi Wirthner
Griselda Marchbanks			Louise Jameson	
Marius			Jason Forbes	
Olympe Maxime	Frances de la Tour		Julie Dray	
Minerva McGonagall	Maggie Smith	Fiona Glascott	Michelle Gomez	Janet McTeer
Jim McGuffin			Adam Samuel-Bal	
Cormac McLaggen	Freddie Stroma			Alexander Currie
Alastor "Mad-Eye" Moody	Brendan Gleeson		James McAvoy	
Graham Montague				D'Angelou Osei-Kissiedu
Mousy Woman			Sarah Whitehouse	
Auntie Muriel	Matyelok Gibbs		Mia Soteriou	
Moaning Myrtle	Shirley Henderson		Megan Richards	Molly Hewitt-Richards
Eric Munch			Sule Rimi	
Nagini		Claudia Kim		
Sir Nicholas de Mimsy-Porpington Nearly Headless Nick	John Cleese		Stephen Mangan	Leo Bill
Z Nettles			Rachel Atkins	
Nott			Ian Conningham	
Oblansk			Dan Starkey	
Bob Ogden			Andrew James Spooner	
Garrick Ollivander	John Hurt		Hugh Ross	Anton Lesser
Pansy Parkinson	Genevieve Gaunt; Scarlett Byrne		Heaven Harriott; Miriam Nyarko	Laila Barwick
Padma Patil	Afshan Azad		Sara Deshmukh	Anjula Murali
Parvati Patil	Sitara Shah; Shefali Chowdhury		Sasha Watson-Lobo; Avni Deshmukh	Alessia Leoni
Peeves	Rik Mayall^{E}		Nigel Pilkington	Peter Serafinowicz
Perkins			Mat Fraser	
Peter Pettigrew	Timothy Spall; Charles Hughes^{Y}		Blake Harrison; Rory Toms^{Y}	
Irma Pince	Sally Mortemore		Yasmin Mwanza	
Poliakoff			Jasper Pattison	
Piers Polkiss	Jason Boyd		Edward Frowde; Louis Hill	Mickey McAnulty
Poppy Pomfrey	Gemma Jones		Rebecca Root	Bríd Brennan
Portly Ghost			Finbar Lynch	
Albus Severus Potter	Arthur Bowen		Sam Budibent	
Harry Potter	Daniel Radcliffe; Saunders triplets^{Y} Toby Papworth^{Y}		Frankie Treadaway; Jaxon Knopf; Sam Stafford	Dominic McLaughlin
James Potter	Adrian Rawlins; Robbie Jarvis^{Y} Alfie McIlwain^{Y}		Tom Glenister; Fletcher Bell^{Y}	Jasper Talbot
James Sirius Potter	Will Dunn		Isaac Filler	
Lily Potter	Geraldine Somerville; Ellie Darcey-Alden^{Y}		Tia Bannon; Beatrice Venneear^{Y}	Hannah Chinn
Lily Luna Potter	Daphne de Beistegui		Beatrice Hope Henley	
Ernie Prang	Jimmy Gardner		Paul J. Smith	
Demetrius Prod			Adam Samuel-Bal	
Adrian Pucey				Dylan Heath
Doris Purkiss			Claire Morgan	
Quirinus Quirrell	Ian Hart		Sacha Dhawan	Luke Thallon
Helena Ravenclaw The Grey Lady	Nina Young; Kelly Macdonald		Victoria Jones	
Demelza Robins			Adaora Anwa	
Augustus Rookwood			Doc Butler	
Madam Puddifoot			Victoria Jones	
Mr Roberts			Ewan Bailey	
Ronan			Tom Alexander	
Madam Rosmerta	Julie Christie		Nadia Albina	
Thorfinn Rowle	Rod Hunt		Tom Alexander	
Albert Runcorn	David O'Hara		Dempsey Bovell	
Scabior	Nick Moran		Carl Prekopp	
Newt Scamander		Eddie Redmayne; Joshua Shea^{Y}		
Rufus Scrimgeour	Bill Nighy		Nicholas Boulton	
Selwyn			David Ahmad	
Kingsley Shacklebolt	George Harris		Abraham Popoola	
Jack Sloper			Gabriel Clapson	
Enid Smeek			Nadia Albina	
Stan Shunpike	Lee Ingleby		David Holmes	
Rita Skeeter	Miranda Richardson		Anna Maxwell Martin	
Horace Slughorn	Jim Broadbent		Bill Nighy	
Hepzibah Smith			Kiran Landa	
Zacharias Smith			Thierry Wickens	
Severus Snape	Alan Rickman; Alec Hopkins^{Y} Benedict Clarke^{Y}		Riz Ahmed; Raj Swamy^{Y} Mylo Khan^{Y}	Paapa Essiedu
Sorting Hat	Leslie Phillips^{V}		Lennie James	David Threlfall
The Sphinx			Amira Ghazalla	
Alicia Spinnet			Grace Barkley	Serrana Su-Ling Bliss
Pomona Sprout	Miriam Margolyes		Gemma Whelan	Sirine Saba
Ted the News Reader			Nicholas Boulton	
Pius Thicknesse	Guy Henry		Jason Forbes	
Dean Thomas	Alfred Enoch		Dray Oli; Joseph Nicholas	Elijah Oshin
Orsino Thruston	Philip Selway			
Professor Tofty			Dan Starkey	
Tom	Derek Deadman; Jim Tavare		Gene Foad	
Andromeda Tonks			Claire Morgan	
Nymphadora Tonks	Natalia Tena		Ambika Mod	
Ted Tonks			David Troughton	
Train announcement			David Holt	
Train guard			Dan Starkey	
Travers			Thomas Bliss	
Sybill Trelawney	Emma Thompson		Saoirse-Monica Jackson	
Donaghan Tremlett	Steve Mackey			
Lisa Turpin				Eve Walls
Wilkie Twycross			Gene Foad	
Dolores Umbridge	Imelda Staunton		Keira Knightley	
Romilda Vane	Anna Shaffer		Chase Collard	
Verity			Lizzie Stables	
Violet			Danusia Samal	
Lord Voldemort Tom Riddle	Ralph Fiennes; Richard Bremmer; Ian Hart^{V} Christian Coulson^{Y} Hero Fiennes Tiffin^{Y} Frank Dillane^{Y}		Matthew Macfadyen; Oscar Brudenall-Jones^{Y} Sam Squire^{Y}	Billy Barratt^{Y}
Tom Riddle Sr.			Adam Samuel-Bal	
The Riddle family cook			Claire Morgan	
The Riddle family maid			Danusia Samal	
Myron Wagtail	Jarvis Cocker			
Celestina Warbeck			Shirley Bassey	
Cassius Warrington			Joshua Akehurst	
Arthur Weasley	Mark Williams		Simon Pegg	Rafe Spall
Bill Weasley	Richard Fish; Domhnall Gleeson		Leo Woodall	
Charlie Weasley	Alex Crockford		Joel Fry	Harry Gilby
Fred Weasley	James Phelps		Hamish Lloyd Barnes	Tristan Harland
George Weasley	Oliver Phelps		Hamish Lloyd Barnes	Gabriel Harland
Ginny Weasley	Bonnie Wright		Bumble Clarke; Shreya Lallu; Claire-Louise Cordwell	Gracie Cochrane; Bonnie Hill
Molly Weasley	Julie Walters		Nina Wadia	Katherine Parkinson
Percy Weasley	Chris Rankin		Tom Royal	Ruari Spooner
Ron Weasley	Rupert Grint		Max Lester; Rhys Mulligan; Matthew Houston	Alastair Stout
Williamson			Rufus Wright	
Winky			Clare Corbett	
Oliver Wood	Sean Biggerstaff		Mitchell Robertson	Orson Matthews
Eldred Worple	Paul Ritter		Adam Samuel-Bal	
Corban Yaxley	Peter Mullan		Mat Fraser	
Young Woman Ghost			Liis Mikk	
Blaise Zabini	Louis Cordice		Mitchell Zhangazha	
Zookeeper			Gerard McDermott	
=== Introduced in Fantastic Beasts ===
Abernathy		Kevin Guthrie		
Chastity Barebone		Jenn Murray		
Credence Barebone Aurelius Dumbledore		Ezra Miller		
Mary Lou Barebone		Samantha Morton		
Modesty Barebone		Faith Wood-Blagrove		
Bunty Broadacre		Victoria Yeates		
Carrow		Maja Bloom		
Irma Dugard		Danielle Hugues		
Edith		Ramona Kunze-Libnow		
Henrietta Fischer		Valerie Pachner		
Gnarlak		Ron Perlman^{V}		
Porpentina Esther "Tina" Goldstein		Katherine Waterston		
Queenie Goldstein		Alison Sudol		
Percival Graves		Colin Farrell		
Grimmson		Ingvar Eggert Sigurðsson		
Helmut		Aleksandr Kuznetsov		
Eulalie "Lally" Hicks		Jessica Williams		
Laurena Kama		Isaura Barbé-Brown		
Yusuf Kama		William Nadylam; Isaac Domingos^{Y}		
Jacob Kowalski		Dan Fogler		
Krall		David Sakurai		
Leta Lestrange		Zoë Kravitz; Thea Lamb^{Y} Ruby Woolfenden^{Y}		
Otto		Matthias Brenner		
Seraphina Picquery		Carmen Ejogo		
Vinda Rosier		Poppy Corby-Tuech		
Vicência Santos		Maria Fernanda Cândido		
Theseus Scamander		Callum Turner		
Henry Shaw Jr.		Josh Cowdery		
Henry Shaw Sr.		Jon Voight		
Langdon Shaw		Ronan Raftery		
Skender		Ólafur Darri Ólafsson		
Liu Tao		Dave Wong		
Anton Vogel		Oliver Masucci		
Warder		Peter Simonischek		
Madam Ya Zhou		Gemma Chan		

== See also ==
- List of Harry Potter (film series) cast members
- List of Fantastic Beasts cast members
- List of Harry Potter (TV series) cast members
- List of Harry Potter and the Cursed Child cast members
