= Blaise Zabini =

- Harry Potter character
- Louis Cordice as Blaise Zabini in Harry Potter and the Half-Blood Prince
- First appearance: Harry Potter and the Philosopher's Stone (1997)
- Created by: J. K. Rowling
- Portrayed by: Louis Cordice
- Voiced by: Mitchell Zhangazha

In-universe information
- House: Slytherin
- Born: 1979–1980

Blaise Zabini is a character in J. K. Rowling's Harry Potter series. A minor character, his gender was not revealed until Harry Potter and the Half-Blood Prince, which resulted in several fans initially believing him to be female and errors in the series' Dutch and Croatian translations. Despite this, he is more popular in fan-fiction of the series, partially due to his status as one of the few characters in Harry Potter of African descent. He was 17 in the Half-Blood Prince book.

== Appearances ==
Blaise is one of the "few black students at Hogwarts." He was initially mentioned as the last student to have been sorted by the Sorting Hat, which placed him in Slytherin. In Harry Potter and the Half-Blood Prince, he is described as "a tall black boy with high cheekbones and long, slanting eyes". His mother is described as a "famously beautiful" witch who had "married seven times", with all of them ending in mysterious fatalities that left her significantly wealthier.

He is portrayed as snobbish and with "exceptional good looks". In one of the few lines he has, he calls Ginny Weasley "blood traitor", a derogatory term used by "pure-blood" wizards against other pure-bloods who choose to associate with "muggles" or "muggle-borns". Due to the gender-neutral nature of his name and the lack of a description of him in the earlier novels, Dutch translations of the first novels in the series referred to him as female. This was corrected in the translation of Harry Potter and the Half-Blood Prince when his gender was revealed.

In the film adaptations of the novels, Blaise is portrayed by Louis Cordice. The character replaced Josh Herdman's role of Gregory Goyle in the Battle of Hogwarts in the second part of the film adaptation of Harry Potter and the Deathly Hallows so the role Herdman did have as Goyle would replace Vincent Crabbe, whose actor Jamie Waylett had been arrested for being in possession of cannabis and a knife.

== Reception ==
As he was only mentioned once in the first book with no other descriptors, he was the "subject of rampant speculation, shipping, and fan art." Fan fiction written prior to the publishing of the sixth book typically depicted him as a "ghostly pale white male." Keidra Chaney and Raizel Liebler argue that this largely arose from writer Cassandra Clare's depiction of Blaise in her Harry Potter fan-fiction work The Draco Trilogy. According to Maria I Velazquez, following the reveal of his race, some fans of the series reacted with "frustration, grief, and anger at Rowling for "shatter[ing]" their image of Blaise by making him black." She quoted a blogger who argued that this exemplified the "ways in which racism and stereotypes frame the ways in which one reads a text", and that "whiteness becomes a kind of default, so characters are often assumed to be white unless the text explicitly states otherwise." Velazquez, notes that his race is "still an ongoing tension" within the fandom. She writes that "anti-black sentiments" towards the casting of Zabini in the films "became an opportunity for antiracist fans to engage in an extended, ongoing critique of real-world racism(s) in both fandom and the series itself." Chaney and Liebler note that some fan-fiction works continued to depict Blaise as "white" and a "goth". However, they did not understand why those fans believed that Blaise "could not continue to be gothy while being African-British", and posited that they were either "slightly racist" or that as a character of African descent, to them, he no longer fit into the "Goth identity." There were also disputes between fans regarding his gender.

The character is significantly more prominently featured in fan fiction than in the original series. As of 2018, there were 6,000 pieces of fan-fiction on FanFiction.Net and another 6,000 on Archive of Our Own featuring him as the main character, with many more featuring him as a major character. Judith Brottrager, Joël Doat, Julian Häußler and Thomas Weitin write that he is a "fan favorite" despite him "scarcely" having a presence in the source material. They attributed this to fan fiction authors' "desire for completion", with the characters and settings of the houses of Hogwarts other than Gryffindor, being "mostly unexplored" in the original novels. They further write that the "mere quantitative rise in the occurrences of his character name is also connected to an increased intensity of connections to other characters" and that he is a "prime example for a fanfiction shift." They argue that his status as one of the few "POCs" from the original novels and as a "flat character", with his background and identity being "not overly explored or spelled out", makes him more attractive to fan fiction authors. The further note that while he may act as a 'tabula rasa' for fan fiction authors, the few characteristics of his that are depicted are a "useful shorthand for a character type in fanfictions."

Taylor Pernini argues that Blaise's "position as both a character of color and an espouser of blood supremacist ideals places the audience in an uncomfortable space", giving him the "potential to be an incredibly complex and even inscrutable character". However, Rowling does "almost nothing" with the character, providing the "barest glimpse of a character who could present a variety of complicated issues of identity and ‘otherness’ within discriminatory groups", even though he remains nearly "nonexistent in the text." He occupies a "difficult space" within the source material, which "does very little to address that difficulty". Pernini argues that it is for this reason that Blaise "possesses the largest discrepancy" between his prominence in the source material and in fan-fiction. She writes that fan-fiction is the "only way" for fans to deal with the "complete and utter lack of attention to a character of color in such an unexpected position", which is seen by them as a "tragic failure". Pernini notes that fan works range from depicting him as a "total and unrepentant Death Eater-sympathizer" to being "forced to espouse those beliefs for his own life and the lives of others" to a "cunning man who refuses to pick a side and remains neutral." Some pieces of fan-fiction depict him eventually changing his views with regard to blood supremacy. She concludes: "To a large degree, Blaise Zabini remains a huge question mark in the source text, and the only way to handle that is to try to provide some kind of answers in a new story."

Vilma Vuorinen notes that his mother is potentially the only other Black woman in the series apart from Angelina Johnson, a Hogwarts student, and that she "serves no other purpose in the story other than to be perceived as a Jezebel" and is "completely devoid of agency outside her nature as a temptress."

The character is the subject of the 2007 song Who is Blaise Zabini? by wizard rock band The Parselmouths. The song describes how both he and his peers were initially unable to perceive him clearly. In the song, his peers attempt to determine his gender by observing the dormitory in which he resides, but this fails as he "just kind of disappears", with Blaise himself "confunded" of his own gender identity, unsure of which restroom to use. Once he is described, his peers are able to properly perceive him and he is then "secure in being a boy". Anne Collins Smith writes that through the line "he would have been a nice girl as well", the song "emphasizes his earlier gender indeterminacy as a potentiality that could have gone in either direction", and that it "may also be interpreted as an olive branch offered to fans who had previously imagined the character as female and were disappointed to have their version deauthorized." Smith argues that the band "ordinarily stick fairly close" to the original perspective of the source material while giving him a "readerlike stance so that he too perceives himself as undefined until the original author (J. K. Rowling) provides him with a more distinctive description." Smith notes that while the song appears to reference the conflict regarding Blaise's gender, the line "we knew that he was cool" suggests a "desire to maintain a positive standpoint on the character."
