= Short Stories from Hogwarts of Heroism, Hardship and Dangerous Hobbies =

Book by J. K. Rowling

Harry Potter books Short Stories from Hogwarts of Heroism, Hardship and Dangerous Hobbies
- Author: J. K. Rowling
- Genre: Fantasy
- Price: £2.99 / US$3 / €2.99
- Publication date: 6 September 2016
- Pages: 72

Short Stories from Hogwarts of Heroism, Hardship and Dangerous Hobbies is an e-book written by J. K. Rowling, a guide to Hogwarts' teachers.

== Publication history ==
This book was released at the same time as two others Hogwarts: An Incomplete and Unreliable Guide and Short Stories from Hogwarts of Power, Politics and Pesky Poltergeists as a part of a series named Pottermore Presents. It was released on 6 September 2016 in several languages at the same time.

== Summary ==
In this guide, the readers find information about Minerva McGonagall, Remus Lupin, Sybill Trelawney and Silvanus Kettleburn.

== Contents ==
- "Minerva McGonagall"
- "Animagi"
- "Remus Lupin"
- "Werewolves"
- "Sybill Trelawney"
- "Naming Seers"
- "Sylvanus Kettleburn"

== Reception ==
Kate Samuelson of Time.com expressed that the book contained a lot of surprising and intricate details about the characters as well as insight into the history of the wizarding world and interesting revelations of Rowling’s writing regrets. Some fans reacted negatively to the fact that most of the book's content had already been available for free online at Pottermore.
