= Short Stories from Hogwarts of Power, Politics and Pesky Poltergeists =

Book by J. K. Rowling

Harry Potter books Short Stories from Hogwarts of Power, Politics and Pesky Poltergeists
- Author: J. K. Rowling
- Genre: Fantasy
- Price: £2.99 / US$3 / €2.99
- Publication date: 6 September 2016
- Pages: 66

Short Stories from Hogwarts of Power, Politics and Pesky Poltergeists is an e-book written by J. K. Rowling. It was released on 6 September 2016 in several languages at the same time.

== Publication history ==
This book was released at the same time as two others Hogwarts: An Incomplete and Unreliable Guide and Short Stories from Hogwarts of Heroism, Hardship and Dangerous Hobbies as a part of a series named Pottermore Presents. It was released on 6 September 2016 in several languages at the same time.

== Summary ==
In the short fictional works collected in the book, Rowling provides information about Dolores Umbridge, Horace Slughorn, Quirinus Quirrell, Peeves, the Ministry of Magic and Azkaban.

== Contents ==
- "Dolores Umbridge"
- "Ministers for Magic"
- "Azkaban"
- "Horace Slughorn"
- "Potions"
- "Polyjuice Potion"
- "Cauldrons"
- "Quirinus Quirrell"
- "Peeves the Poltergeist"
