= List of Harry Potter characters =

This is a list of notable characters found in the fictional universe of Harry Potter. Each character appears in at least one of the following works written, co-written or based on a story by J. K. Rowling:

- The seven original Harry Potter novels (1997–2007)
- The three films in the Fantastic Beasts series (2016–2022)
- Quidditch Through the Ages (2001)
- The Tales of Beedle the Bard (2008)
- Harry Potter and the Cursed Child (2016)
- Short Stories from Hogwarts of Power, Politics and Pesky Poltergeists (2016)
- Short Stories from Hogwarts of Heroism, Hardship and Dangerous Hobbies (2016)
- Hogwarts: An Incomplete and Unreliable Guide (2016)
- The Harry Potter prequel (2008)

== Characters by surname ==
=== A ===
- Abbott, Hannah – Hufflepuff prefect in the same year as Harry Potter. Member of Dumbledore's Army. Hannah leaves Hogwarts in Half-Blood Prince after her mother is murdered by Death Eaters, but returns in Deathly Hallows to participate in the Battle of Hogwarts. As an adult, Hannah becomes the owner of The Leaky Cauldron and marries Neville Longbottom. She is portrayed by Charlotte Skeoch in the Harry Potter films.

=== B ===
- Bagman, Ludo – Head of the Department of Magical Games and Sports at the Ministry of Magic. He loves gambling, which got him in financial troubles during both the Quidditch World Cup and the Triwizard Tournament, of which he is one of the judges. Bagman flees after the third task of the Tournament, being unable to pay his bet to goblins.
- Bagshot, Bathilda – Author of A History of Magic, and the great-aunt of Gellert Grindelwald. Under the influence of Veritaserum, Bagshot is a major source of information for Rita Skeeter's biography of Albus Dumbledore. Bagshot is portrayed by Hazel Douglas in the film Harry Potter and the Deathly Hallows – Part 1 (2010).
- Bell, Katie – Gryffindor Quidditch Chaser one year above Harry. Member of Dumbledore's Army. In Half-Blood Prince, Katie is cursed after touching a necklace Draco Malfoy intended to give to Albus Dumbledore. In Deathly Hallows, she participates in the Battle of Hogwarts. Katie is portrayed by Emily Dale in the first two Harry Potter films. She is portrayed by Georgina Leonidas in Half-Blood Prince and Deathly Hallows – Part 1 and Part 2.
- Binns, Cuthbert – The History of Magic professor at Hogwarts. He is the only ghost professor.
- Black, Regulus – Sirius' younger brother and defected Death Eater, who switched Slytherin's locket (one of Voldemort's Horcruxes) for a fake one, leaving a note to his former master signed as "R.A.B." Sacrifices his life while ensuring his House-elf Kreacher escapes with the real locket.
- Black, Sirius – Harry's godfather. Animagus. He was falsely accused of murdering twelve Muggles and betraying Lily and James Potter to Voldemort. Sirius escapes from the wizard prison Azkaban and joins the revived Order of the Phoenix. He is later killed by his cousin Bellatrix Lestrange.
- Bones, Susan – Hufflepuff student in Harry's year and member of Dumbledore's Army. Niece of Amelia Bones and Edgar Bones. Susan is portrayed by Eleanor Columbus in the Harry Potter films and by Alex Tregear in the Order of the Phoenix video game.
- Boot, Terry – Ravenclaw student in Harry's year and member of Dumbledore's Army. He is a close friend of Michael Corner and Anthony Goldstein.
- Brown, Lavender – Gryffindor student in Harry's year and member of Dumbledore's Army. In Order of the Phoenix, she initially believes the Ministry's smear campaign against Harry. The following year, she has a romance with Ron Weasley, which ends after she becomes jealous of Ron's friendship with Hermione Granger. In Deathly Hallows, Lavender is attacked by Fenrir Greyback during the Battle of Hogwarts. Her fate is not clear in the novel, but she dies in the film adaptation. Lavender is portrayed by Kathleen Cauley in the film adaptation of Chamber of Secrets, by Jennifer Smith in Prisoner of Azkaban, and by Jessie Cave in Half-Blood Prince and Deathly Hallows – Part 2.
- Bryce, Frank – Muggle gardener who is killed by Voldemort. Bryce is portrayed by Eric Sykes in the film adaptation of Goblet of Fire (2005).
- Burbage, Charity – Professor of Muggle Studies at Hogwarts. Killed by Voldemort in Deathly Hallows. Portrayed by Carolyn Pickles in the Harry Potter films.

=== C ===
- Carrow, Alecto – Death Eater and sister of Amycus Carrow. Professor of Muggle Studies and Deputy Headmistress of Hogwarts under Severus Snape.
- Carrow, Amycus – Death Eater and brother of Alecto Carrow. Professor of Defence Against the Dark Arts and Deputy Headmaster of Hogwarts under Severus Snape.
- Chang, Cho – Ravenclaw Quidditch Seeker and member of Dumbledore's Army. One year above Harry, and his first love interest. Cho is one of the first students to believe Harry's declaration of Voldemort's return. In the film adaptation of Order of the Phoenix, Cho exposes Dumbledore's Army to Dolores Umbridge while under the influence of a truth potion, whereas in the novel it is her friend Marietta Edgecombe who willfully betrays the group. In Harry's fifth year, Cho kisses him and goes on a date with him, but Harry eventually ends their relationship. Cho is portrayed by Katie Leung in the Harry Potter films.
- Corner, Michael – Ravenclaw student in Harry's year and member of Dumbledore's Army. He begins a romance with Ginny Weasley, but she eventually ends the relationship. He then begins seeing Cho Chang. Ryan Nelson portrays Michael Corner in Harry Potter and the Order of the Phoenix.
- Crabbe, Vincent – Slytherin student in Harry's year and the son of a Death Eater. Beater for the Slytherin Quidditch team and member of Umbridge's Inquisitorial Squad. Killed by his own Fiendfyre spell. Crabbe is portrayed by Jamie Waylett in the Harry Potter films.
- Creevey, Colin – Muggle-born Gryffindor student one year below Harry. Older brother of Dennis Creevey and member of Dumbledore's Army. Killed during the Battle of Hogwarts. Colin is portrayed by Hugh Mitchell in the film adaptation of Chamber of Secrets.
- Crouch Sr, Bartemius – Head of the Department of Magical Law Enforcement during Voldemort’s first rise to power. He convicted his son, Barty Crouch Jr, who was a Death Eater; however, later Crouch secretly saves his son from Azkaban through a Polyjuice Potion switch with his dying wife and keeps him under the Imperius Curse. Voldemort later seizes control of Crouch, frees Barty Jr, and forces Crouch to continue working, including serving as a Triwizard Tournament judge, until he escapes to warn Dumbledore. Before he can do so, his son murders him. Roger Lloyd-Pack appeared as Mr. Crouch in the fourth film.
- Crouch Jr, Barty – Death Eater credited with facilitating the return of Voldemort. Impersonates Alastor Moody with Polyjuice Potion and later receives a Dementor's Kiss. He is played by David Tennant in the film adaptation of Harry Potter and the Goblet of Fire.

=== D ===
- Dawlish, John – Auror that accompanies Fudge to Hogwarts to confront Harry and Dumbledore. All of his attempts to arrest Order of the Phoenix members and allies (Dumbledore, Hagrid, Neville's grandmother, etc.) fail. Dawlish is portrayed by Richard Leaf in the film adaptation of Harry Potter and the Order of the Phoenix.
- Delacour, Fleur – Champion from Beauxbatons in the Triwizard Tournament. Wife of Bill Weasley and member of the Order of the Phoenix. Participant in the Battle of Hogwarts. Granddaughter of a Veela. Portrayed by Clémence Poésy in the Harry Potter films.
- Diggle, Dedalus – Member of the Order of the Phoenix who takes the Dursleys into hiding. Portrayed by David Brett in the film adaptation of Philosopher's Stone.
- Diggory, Amos – Employee at the Ministry of Magic and father of Cedric Diggory. Portrayed by Jeff Rawle in the film Harry Potter and the Goblet of Fire, and featured in Harry Potter and the Cursed Child. Daniel P. Moloney cited him as a negative example of parenting in the series because the character seems to view his son as an extension of himself.
- Diggory, Cedric – Seeker for the Hufflepuff Quidditch team and prefect two years above Harry. He competes in the Triwizard Tournament in Goblet of Fire and is killed on Voldemort's orders after winning the event with Harry. In the play Harry Potter and the Cursed Child, Cedric becomes a Death Eater in an alternate timeline. Cedric is portrayed by Robert Pattinson in the film adaptation of Goblet of Fire and by Joe Livermore in Prisoner of Azkaban. Henry Cavill also auditioned for the part in Goblet of Fire. Pattinson said his experience during the production of the film inspired him to keep acting. Cedric's death was listed by Business Insider as the most heartbreaking death in the Harry Potter films. Cedric is voiced by Blake Ritson in the Goblet of Fire video game.
- Doge, Elphias – School friend of Albus Dumbledore and member of the original Order of the Phoenix. Writes an obituary for Dumbledore in The Daily Prophet. Portrayed by Peter Cartwright in the film adaptation of Order of the Phoenix and by David Ryall in Deathly Hallows – Part 1.
- Dolohov, Antonin – Death Eater, responsible for the death of Molly Weasley's brothers. Escapes Azkaban, participates in the battle of the Department of Mysteries, and kills Remus Lupin in the Battle of Hogwarts.
- Dumbledore, Aberforth – Brother of Albus and Ariana Dumbledore. Owner of The Hog's Head tavern and member of the Order of the Phoenix. In Deathly Hallows, he sends Dobby to rescue Harry and other prisoners from Malfoy Manor. He later helps Harry enter Hogwarts. Aberforth is portrayed by Jim McManus in the film adaptation of Order of the Phoenix, by Ciarán Hinds in Deathly Hallows – Part 2, and by Richard Coyle in Fantastic Beasts: The Secrets of Dumbledore.
- Dumbledore, Albus – Headmaster of Hogwarts during Harry's school years. Transfiguration professor at Hogwarts during Tom Riddle's school years. Founder of the Order of the Phoenix. Dumbledore orchestrated his own death at the hands of Severus Snape.
- Dumbledore, Ariana – Sister of Albus and Aberforth Dumbledore. Killed during a three-way duel between Albus, Aberforth and Gellert Grindelwald.
- Dursley, Dudley – Son of Vernon and Petunia Dursley, and cousin of Harry. Portrayed by Harry Melling in the Harry Potter films. During the course of the film series, Melling lost a considerable amount of weight. To accurately portray Dudley in Deathly Hallows – Part 1, Melling wore a fat suit.
- Dursley, Marge – Sister of Vernon Dursley who is accidentally inflated by Harry. Marge is portrayed by Pam Ferris in the film adaptation of Prisoner of Azkaban (2004).
- Dursley, Petunia – Harry's aunt, Vernon's wife and Dudley's mother. In the Harry Potter films, Petunia is portrayed by Fiona Shaw (adult) and Ariella Paradise (child).
- Dursley, Vernon – Harry's uncle, Petunia's husband and Dudley's father. Vernon is portrayed by Richard Griffiths in the Harry Potter films.

=== E ===
- Edgecombe, Marietta – Ravenclaw student, Cho Chang's friend and member of Dumbledore's Army. Marietta later betrays the group to Umbridge.

=== F ===
- Figg, Arabella – An elderly Squib enlisted by Dumbledore to watch over Harry during his childhood from her nearby home. Member of the Order of the Phoenix. Crossbreeder of cats and Kneazles. Portrayed by Kathryn Hunter in the film adaptation of Order of the Phoenix.
- Filch, Argus – Squib caretaker of Hogwarts. Portrayed by David Bradley in the Harry Potter films and Paul Whitehouse in the television series.
- Finch-Fletchley, Justin – Muggle-born Hufflepuff student in Harry's year. Member of Dumbledore's Army. Portrayed by Edward Randell in the film adaptation of Chamber of Secrets.
- Finnigan, Seamus – An Irish Gryffindor student in Harry's year. In Order of the Phoenix, Seamus is initially influenced by the Ministry's smear campaign against Harry. He later joins Dumbledore's Army. Seamus is portrayed by Devon Murray in the Harry Potter films.
- Fletcher, Mundungus – Petty thief and member of the Order of the Phoenix. Keeps Dumbledore notified of happenings in the criminal element of the wizarding world. Mundungus is portrayed by Andy Linden in the film Harry Potter and the Deathly Hallows – Part 1.
- Flitwick, Filius – Professor of Charms and the Head of Ravenclaw House. He has distant goblin ancestry. He is portrayed by Warwick Davis in the Harry Potter films.
- Fudge, Cornelius – Minister for Magic in the first five novels. Removed from his position after denying Voldemort's return. Fudge is portrayed by Robert Hardy in the film series.

=== G ===
- Goldstein, Anthony – Ravenclaw student in Harry's year and member of Dumbledore's Army. He is a close friend of Michael Corner and Terry Boot.
- Goyle, Gregory – Slytherin student in Harry's year. Beater for the Slytherin Quidditch team and member of the Inquisitorial Squad. Goyle is portrayed by Joshua Herdman in the Harry Potter films.
- Granger, Hermione – Muggle-born Gryffindor prefect in Harry's year, and one of his closest friends. Co-founder of Dumbledore's Army. Wife of Ron Weasley and mother of Hugo Granger-Weasley and Rose Granger-Weasley.
- Granger, Mr and Mrs – Hermione Granger's parents. During the Second Wizarding War, Hermione alters their memories to protect them from Voldemort, which causes them to believe they are Wendell and Monica Wilkins. She later restores their memories.
- Granger-Weasley, Hugo – Son of Ron Weasley and Hermione Granger, and brother of Rose Granger-Weasley. Hugo is portrayed by Ryan Turner in the film Harry Potter and the Deathly Hallows – Part 2 (2011).
- Granger-Weasley, Rose – Daughter of Ron Weasley and Hermione Granger, and sister of Hugo Granger-Weasley. Rose is portrayed by Helena Barlow in the film Harry Potter and the Deathly Hallows – Part 2 (2011).
- Graves, Percival – A high-ranking auror and Director of Magical Security for MACUSA. For most of the plot of the film Fantastic Beasts and Where to Find Them, Grindelwald is disguised as Graves, who is portrayed by Colin Farrell.
- Greengrass, Astoria – Wife of Draco Malfoy who dies from a blood curse. She is portrayed by Jade Gordon in the film Harry Potter and the Deathly Hallows – Part 2 (2011).
- Greyback, Fenrir – Werewolf, responsible for turning Remus Lupin into one as a child. Ally of Voldemort and the Death Eaters, and leader of the Snatchers. Mauls Bill Weasley during the night in which Dumbledore dies. Kills Lavender Brown in the final film. Dave Legeno portrays him in the films.
- Grindelwald, Gellert – Dark wizard who was imprisoned after Albus Dumbledore defeated him in the 1940s. In the Fantastic Beasts film series, Grindelwald and Dumbledore are former lovers who made a blood pact in their youth to never harm each other. However, Grindelwald attempts to indirectly kill Dumbledore. In the film Harry Potter and the Deathly Hallows – Part 1 (2010), Grindelwald is portrayed by Jamie Campbell Bower and Michael Byrne. In the Fantastic Beasts film series, he is played by Johnny Depp, Mads Mikkelsen and Bower.
- Grubbly-Plank, Wilhelmina – Substitute Care of Magical Creatures professor. Portrayed by Apple Brook in the film adaptation of Order of the Phoenix.
- Gryffindor, Godric – One of the four founders of Hogwarts, and the founder of Gryffindor House. He valued courage, determination and strength of heart. According to Rowling, he was "the most accomplished dueller of his time and an enlightened fighter against Muggle-discrimination". His relics include the Sword of Gryffindor and the Sorting Hat.

=== H ===
- Hagrid, Rubeus – Hogwarts gamekeeper, Care of Magical Creatures professor, and member of the Order of the Phoenix. Half-giant. He was expelled during his third year at Hogwarts.
- Hooch, Rolanda – Quidditch referee and flying instructor for first-year students. Zoë Wanamaker portrayed her in Harry Potter and the Philosopher's Stone.
- Hopkirk, Mafalda – Ministry of Magic employee who is impersonated by Hermione Granger using Polyjuice Potion.
- Hufflepuff, Helga – One of the four founders of Hogwarts, and the founder of Hufflepuff House. She favoured loyalty, honesty, and dedication. One of her relics, a small golden cup, was stolen by Voldemort and turned into a Horcrux.

=== J ===
- Johnson, Angelina – Chaser for the Gryffindor Quidditch team, and later team captain. She is two years above Harry. She is married to George Weasley. She returns to the school to participate in the Battle of Hogwarts. Angelina is portrayed by Danielle Tabor in the first three Harry Potter films, and by Tiana Benjamin in Goblet of Fire.
- Jordan, Lee – Gryffindor student, close friend of Fred and George Weasley and member of Dumbledore's Army. He is two years above Harry and serves as the Quidditch commentator at Hogwarts. In Deathly Hallows, Lee becomes a pirate radio broadcaster on a station called Potterwatch, which supports the activities of Harry and the Order of the Phoenix. Luke Youngblood portrays Lee in the films and voices him in the Order of the Phoenix video game.
- Jorkins, Bertha – Ministry of Magic employee who is killed by Voldemort. Rowling later revealed that her death was used to turn Nagini into a Horcrux.

=== K ===
- Karkaroff, Igor – Defected Death Eater and Durmstrang's headmaster until his murder at the hands of Death Eaters.
- Krum, Viktor – Bulgarian Quidditch Seeker and Durmstrang student who participates in the Triwizard Tournament. Krum is portrayed by Stanislav Ianevski in the film Harry Potter and the Goblet of Fire (2005).

=== L ===
- Lestrange, Bellatrix – Death Eater who tortured Neville Longbottom's parents into insanity. Killed her cousin Sirius Black. Killed her niece Nymphadora Tonks. Killed by Molly Weasley during the Battle of Hogwarts.
- Lockhart, Gilderoy – Defence Against the Dark Arts professor and fraudulent celebrity author. Loses his memory after a spell backfires. According to Rowling, Lockhart is the only Harry Potter character based on a real-life person. He was inspired by an acquaintance of Rowling who was, in her words, "even more objectionable than his fictional counterpart" and "used to tell whopping great fibs about his past life, all of them designed to demonstrate what a wonderful, brave and brilliant person he was." Lockhart is portrayed by Kenneth Branagh in the film adaptation of Chamber of Secrets.. He will be portrayed by Kit Harington in the Harry Potter TV series of HBO.
- Longbottom, Augusta – Neville's grandmother and supporter of the Order of the Phoeniex. Leila Hoffman portrayed her in the first film.
- Longbottom, Neville – Gryffindor student in Harry's year. Member of Dumbledore's Army.
- Lovegood, Luna – Ravenclaw student one year below Harry. Member of Dumbledore's Army and daughter of Xenophilius Lovegood.
- Lovegood, Xenophilius – Luna's father and editor of The Quibbler. Rhys Ifans portrayed him in Harry Potter and the Deathly Hallows – Part 1.
- Lupin, Remus – School friend of Sirius Black, James Potter and Peter Pettigrew. Professor of Defence Against the Dark Arts in Harry's third year, and member of the Order of the Phoenix. Werewolf. He and his wife Nymphadora Tonks die during the Battle of Hogwarts, leaving their son Teddy Lupin an orphan.
- Lupin, Teddy – Orphaned son of Remus Lupin and Nymphadora Tonks and godson of Harry Potter. He is named after Tonks's father, Ted Tonks. Teddy is a metamorphmagus like his mother.

=== M ===
- Macmillan, Ernie – Hufflepuff student in Harry's year and member of Dumbledore's Army. Ernie initially believes that Harry is the Heir of Slytherin and responsible for the attacks on Muggle-born students. Later, he is among the few students who openly support Harry's claims that Voldemort has returned, and becomes Hufflepuff's prefect. Louis Doyle portrays Ernie in the Harry Potter films and voices him in the Order of the Phoenix video game.
- Macnair, Walden – Death Eater and executioner who fails to execute the hippogriff Buckbeak. Injured by Hagrid during the Battle of Hogwarts.
- Malfoy, Draco – Slytherin student in Harry's year. Quidditch Seeker, prefect, member of the Inquisitorial Squad and eventual Death Eater. Portrayed by Tom Felton in the Harry Potter films.
- Malfoy, Lucius – Death Eater. Father to Draco and husband to Narcissa Malfoy. Governor of Hogwarts early in the series.
- Malfoy, Narcissa – Mother to Draco, wife to Lucius Malfoy and sister to Bellatrix Lestrange. Portrayed by Helen McCrory in the Harry Potter films.
- Maxime, Olympe – Half-giantess and headmistress of the wizarding school Beauxbatons. Portrayed by Frances de la Tour in the Harry Potter films.
- McGonagall, Minerva – Transfiguration professor, Head of Gryffindor House, Deputy Headmistress of Hogwarts, and member of the Order of the Phoenix. Animagus. Led the defence of the school during the Battle of Hogwarts. Headmistress of Hogwarts after Voldemort's death. She is portrayed by Maggie Smith in the Harry Potter films and by Fiona Glascott in the Fantastic Beasts films.
- McLaggen, Cormac – Gryffindor student one year above Harry. Quidditch Keeper and member of the Slug Club. He is portrayed by Freddie Stroma in the Harry Potter films.
- Moody, Alastor – Retired Auror and member of the Order of the Phoenix. Known as "Mad-Eye Moody" because of the magical eye he wears. Impersonated by Barty Crouch Jr as part of a scheme to enter Harry into the Triwizard Tournament. Moody is killed by Voldemort. He is portrayed by Brendan Gleeson in the Harry Potter films.

=== O ===
- Ollivander, Garrick – Wandmaker and proprietor of the Ollivanders wand shop. Master of the Elder Wand before Grindelwald steals it. John Hurt portrayed him in the film series.

=== P ===
- Parkinson, Pansy – Slytherin student in Harry's year. Prefect and member of the Inquisitorial Squad. J. K. Rowling said Parkinson was based on real-life girls who teased her at school.
- Patil, Padma – Ravenclaw student in Harry's year, Parvati's twin sister and member of Dumbledore's Army. She is Ron's date for the Yule Ball in Goblet of Fire. Padma is portrayed by Sharon Sandhu in the film adaptation of Prisoner of Azkaban and by Afshan Azad in later films.
- Patil, Parvati – Gryffindor student in Harry's year, Padma's twin sister and member of Dumbledore's Army. She is Harry's date for the Yule Ball in Goblet of Fire. Parvati is portrayed by Sitara Shah in Prisoner of Azkaban and by Shefali Chowdhury in Goblet of Fire, Order of the Phoenix and Half-Blood Prince.
- Pettigrew, Peter – Death Eater and school friend of Sirius Black, Remus Lupin and Harry's father James Potter. Pettigrew betrayed Harry's parents to Voldemort, resulting in their deaths. It is revealed that Ron Weasley's pet rat Scabbers is actually Pettigrew in his animagus form. Pettigrew is strangled to death by his own magical prosthetic hand.
- Pince, Irma – Hogwarts librarian. Portrayed by Sally Mortemore in Harry Potter and the Chamber of Secrets.
- Pomfrey, Poppy – Hogwarts school nurse. Portrayed by Gemma Jones in the Harry Potter films.
- Potter, Harry – Orphaned son of James and Lily Potter. Gryffindor student at Hogwarts and co-founder of Dumbledore's Army. Close friend of Ron Weasley and Hermione Granger. Husband of Ginny Weasley and father of James Sirius, Albus Severus and Lily Luna Potter.
- Potter, James – husband of Lily Potter and father of Harry Potter.
- Potter, Lily – Wife of James Potter and mother of Harry Potter. Killed by Voldemort. Rowling said that Lily's maiden name, Evans, was derived from Mary Anne Evans, the given name of the author George Eliot. In the film series, Lily is portrayed by Geraldine Somerville as an adult, by Susie Shinner as a teenager, and by Ellie Darcey-Alden as a child.

=== Q ===
- Quirrell, Quirinus – Defence Against the Dark Arts professor in during Harry's first year. When Harry and Quirrell both try to recover the Philosopher's Stone, it is revealed that Voldemort has possessed Quirrell's body. Harry holds off Quirrell long enough for Dumbledore to arrive, at which point Voldemort departs Quirrell's body and Quirrell dies. Although Quirrell's first name is never mentioned in the novels, he was given the first name "Quirinus" in the Harry Potter Trading Card Game. Quirrell is portrayed by Ian Hart in the film adaptation of Philosopher's Stone.

=== R ===
- Ravenclaw, Rowena – One of the four founders of Hogwarts, and the founder of Ravenclaw House.
- Rookwood, Augustus – Death Eater, former Ministry of Magic official that acted as though he was aiding the anti-Voldemort cause, but was revealed as a double agent. Participated in the break-in at the Department of Mysteries, and later escaped from Azkaban. Participated in the Battle of Hogwarts, in which he is finally stunned by Aberforth Dumbledore.
- Rowle, Thorfinn – Death Eater. Assaulted people within Hogwarts and accidentally killed the Death Eater Gibbon. Attacked Harry, Ron and Hermione in Tottenham Court Road, with Antonin Dolohov. Participated at the Battle of Hogwarts. Rod Hunt portrayed him in the films.

=== S ===
- Scamander, Newt – Student expelled from Hogwarts who excels at curing diseases. Magizoologist and author of Fantastic Beasts and Where to Find Them.
- Scrimgeour, Rufus – Head of the Auror Office who replaces Cornelius Fudge as Minister for Magic. Killed by Death Eaters. Bill Nighy played Scrimgeour in Harry Potter and the Deathly Hallows – Part 1.
- Shacklebolt, Kingsley – Auror and bodyguard for the Muggle Prime Minister. Helps organise members of the Order of the Phoenix and fights during the Battle of Hogwarts. After Voldemort's death, Shacklebolt becomes Minister for Magic. Kingsley is portrayed by George Harris in the Harry Potter films.
- Stan Shunpike – Assistant conductor of the Knight Bus. Placed under the Imperious Curse by Death Eaters during Voldemort's second rise to power to do some work for them. Lee Ingleby portrays him in Harry Potter and the Prisoner of Azkaban.
- Skeeter, Rita – Reporter and tabloid journalist for the Daily Prophet and an unregistered Animagus. There was speculation that the attention given to Harry Potter by the press was the inspiration for Skeeter, but Rowling explained in a 2000 interview that she developed the character before the success of the novels. Skeeter is portrayed by Miranda Richardson in the Harry Potter films.
- Slughorn, Horace – Former Potions professor and Head of Slytherin House who returns to teaching for Harry's sixth year. He formerly taught Voldemort and indirectly led to his rise in power by teaching him about Horcruxes. He operates an exclusive social club with chosen students named the Slug Club. Portrayed by Jim Broadbent in the film adaptations of Half-Blood Prince and Deathly Hallows – Part 2.
- Slytherin, Salazar – One of the four founders of Hogwarts, and the founder of Slytherin House. He was a Parselmouth, an accomplished Legilimens, and a proponent of pureblood supremacy. According to Albus Dumbledore, Slytherin prized resourcefulness, determination, cunning and ambition in his students. He is described as power-hungry by the Sorting Hat. His relics include a locket that was later turned into a Horcrux by Voldemort.
- Smith, Hepzibah – Descendant of Helga Hufflepuff and owner of Hufflepuff's cup until she is killed by Voldemort, who uses her death to transform the cup into a Horcrux.
- Smith, Zacharias – Chaser for the Hufflepuff Quidditch team. He joins Dumbledore's Army but is sceptical of Harry's claims. He becomes the Quidditch commentator after Lee Jordan. Nick Shirm portrays Zacharias in the Order of the Phoenix film and voices the character in the video game.
- Snape, Severus – Hogwarts professor of Potions and later Defence Against the Dark Arts. Head of Slytherin House. Member of the Order of the Phoenix and a spy for Albus Dumbledore among the Death Eaters. Headmaster of Hogwarts when the Death Eaters take control of the school. Killed by Voldemort.
- Spinnet, Alicia – Gryffindor Quidditch Chaser two years above Harry and member of Dumbledore's Army. She returns to the school for the Battle of Hogwarts. Alicia is portrayed by Leilah Sutherland in Philosopher's Stone and by Rochelle Douglas in Chamber of Secrets.
- Sprout, Pomona – Hogwarts Herbology professor and Head of Hufflepuff House. Portrayed by Miriam Margolyes in the Harry Potter films.

=== T ===
- Thomas, Dean – Gryffindor student in Harry's year. Member of Dumbledore's Army. Rowling omitted his physical description ("a black boy taller than Ron") from the British edition of Philosopher's Stone following her editor's request to reduce the length of a chapter, but his description was included in the American edition. In Deathly Hallows, he is captured by Snatchers and taken to Malfoy Manor along with Harry, Ron and Hermione. They are all rescued by the house-elf Dobby, and Dean later participates in the Battle of Hogwarts. Alfred Enoch portrays Dean in the Harry Potter films and voices him in the Order of the Phoenix and Deathly Hallows – Part 1 video games.
- Thicknesse, Pius – Head of the Department of Magical Law Enforcement at the start of the final book, when he is placed under the Imperius Curse by Corban Yaxley. He is appointed as Voldemort's puppet Minister for Magic until the Battle of Hogwarts. Guy Henry plays Thicknesse in Harry Potter and the Deathly Hallows – Part 1 and Part 2. In Part 2, Thicknesse is killed by Voldemort.
- Tom – The barman and innkeeper of The Leaky Cauldron. He was represented by actor Derek Deadman in Harry Potter and the Philosopher's Stone (2001) and by Jim Tavaré in Harry Potter and the Prisoner of Azkaban. Their widely different depiction, with Tavaré portraying a hunch-back, was noted by reporter Kelsey Stiegman.
- Tonks, Andromeda – Sister to Bellatrix Lestrange and Narcissa Malfoy, cousin to Sirius Black, wife to Ted Tonks and mother to Nymphadora Tonks. Her marriage to Muggle-born Ted caused her to be disowned from the Black Family Tree.
- Tonks, Nymphadora – A Metamorphmagus, Auror, and member of the Order of the Phoenix. Wife to Remus Lupin and mother to Teddy Lupin. Tonks is killed by her aunt Bellatrix Lestrange during the Battle of Hogwarts. She is portrayed by Natalia Tena in the Harry Potter films.
- Tonks, Ted – Husband to Andromeda and father to Nymphadora Tonks. Killed by Voldemort's supporters for being a Muggle-born.
- Trelawney, Sybill – Hogwarts Divination professor. Uttered a prophecy that prompted Voldemort to attack the Potters. Trelawney is fired by Dolores Umbridge in Order of the Phoenix, but she returns to work in Half-Blood Prince and Deathly Hallows. Trelawney is portrayed by Emma Thompson in the Harry Potter films.

=== U ===
- Umbridge, Dolores – Senior Undersecretary to the Minister for Magic, Hogwarts High Inquisitor and temporary headmistress of Hogwarts. She teaches Defence Against the Dark Arts during Harry's fifth year, and persecutes half-bloods and Muggle-borns under Voldemort. Sentenced to life imprisonment in Azkaban.

=== V ===
- Voldemort – Slytherin student whose given name is Tom Marvolo Riddle. Killed many of his own family members and countless other wizards and Muggles. Killed Harry's parents but failed to kill Harry. Returns to power following Harry's fourth year and begins reign of terror. Also known as Lord Voldemort and the Dark Lord.

=== W ===
- Warren, Myrtle – Muggle-born Ravenclaw student who attended Hogwarts with Voldemort. Killed by a Basilisk in a bathroom, which she haunts as a ghost after her death. Voldemort used her death to create his first Horcrux. Known to students as "Moaning Myrtle". J. K. Rowling said the inspiration for Myrtle was "the frequent presence of a crying girl in communal bathrooms, especially at the parties and discos of my youth." Myrtle is portrayed by Shirley Henderson in the Harry Potter films.
- Weasley, Arthur – Husband of Molly Weasley and father of Bill, Charlie, Percy, Fred, George, Ron, and Ginny Weasley. Member of the Order of the Phoenix. Portrayed by Mark Williams in the Harry Potter films.
- Weasley, Bill – Eldest son of Arthur and Molly Weasley and husband of Fleur Delacour. Curse-breaker for Gringotts Wizarding Bank, member of the Order of the Phoenix and participant in the Battle of Hogwarts. Bill is portrayed by Richard Fish in the film adaptation of Prisoner of Azkaban, and by Domhnall Gleeson in Deathly Hallows – Part 1 and Part 2.
- Weasley, Charlie – Son of Arthur and Molly Weasley. Joins with Horace Slughorn to lead reinforcements during the Battle of Hogwarts.
- Weasley, Fred – Son of Arthur and Molly Weasley and identical twin brother of George Weasley. Beater for the Gryffindor Quidditch team, member of Dumbledore's Army, and co-owner of the joke shop Weasleys' Wizard Wheezes. Killed in the Battle of Hogwarts. Fred is portrayed by James Phelps in the Harry Potter films.
- Weasley, George – Son of Arthur and Molly Weasley and identical twin brother of Fred Weasley. Beater for the Gryffindor Quidditch team, member of Dumbledore's Army, and co-owner of Weasleys' Wizard Wheezes. Married to Angelina Johnson. George is portrayed by Oliver Phelps in the Harry Potter films.
- Weasley, Ginny – Youngest child and only daughter of Arthur and Molly Weasley. Gryffindor student one year below Harry. Seeker and Chaser for the Quidditch team and member of Dumbledore's Army. Married to Harry.
- Weasley, Molly – Wife of Arthur Weasley and mother of Bill, Charlie, Percy, Fred, George, Ron, and Ginny Weasley. Member of the Order of the Phoenix. Kills Bellatrix Lestrange during the Battle of Hogwarts. Molly is portrayed by Julie Walters in the Harry Potter films, and will be played by Katherine Parkinson in the upcoming HBO television series.
- Weasley, Percy – Third son of Arthur and Molly. Gryffindor prefect and Head Boy, then Ministry of Magic employee. He becomes estranged from his family but fights alongside them in the Battle of Hogwarts. Percy is portrayed by Chris Rankin in the film series.
- Weasley, Ron – Youngest son of Arthur and Molly Weasley. Gryffindor prefect, co-founder of Dumbledore's Army and Quidditch Keeper. Close friend of Harry, husband of Hermione Granger, and father of Hugo Granger-Weasley and Rose Granger-Weasley.
- Wood, Oliver – Gryffindor Quidditch Keeper and captain who is four years above Harry. Wood is portrayed by Sean Biggerstaff in the Harry Potter films.

=== Y ===
- Yaxley, Corban – Death Eater. Places Pius Thicknesse under the Imperius Curse to serve as Minister for Magic as part of Voldemort's takeover of the Ministry. Serves as Head of Magical Law Enforcement under Thicknesse and leads the prosecution of Muggle-borns alongside Umbridge. Portrayed by Peter Mullan in Harry Potter and the Deathly Hallows – Part 1.

=== Z ===
- Zabini, Blaise – Slytherin student in Harry's year.

== Characters with no surname ==
=== A ===
- Aragog – Gigantic spider capable of human speech. Raised by Rubeus Hagrid. A wolf spider discovered in Iran, Lycosa aragogi, was named after him.

=== B ===
- The Bloody Baron – The ghost of Slytherin House. He murdered Helena Ravenclaw (who became the Grey Lady), then killed himself. He wears chains as a reminder of his crime, and is one of the few characters at Hogwarts who can control Peeves. The Bloody Baron is portrayed by Terence Bayler in the film adaptation of Philosopher's Stone.

=== D ===
- Dobby – House-elf belonging to the Malfoy family. In Chamber of Secrets, he tries to discourage Harry from returning to Hogwarts. Harry later tricks Lucius Malfoy into setting Dobby free, which earns Harry the elf's undying loyalty. In Goblet of Fire, Dobby works at Hogwarts and helps Harry with the second task of the Triwizard Tournament. When Harry and his friends are captured by Death Eaters in Deathly Hallows, Dobby rescues them. During the escape, he is killed by Bellatrix Lestrange. The entertainment website IGN described Dobby's death as one of the most emotional moments in the film series. Dobby is voiced by Toby Jones in the Harry Potter films.

=== F ===
- The Fat Friar – The ghost of Hufflepuff House. He is cheerful and helpful towards students. He is portrayed by Simon Fisher-Becker in the film adaptation of Philosopher's Stone.
- Fawkes – Phoenix belonging to Albus Dumbledore. Fawkes saves Harry from the Basilisk inside the Chamber of Secrets. In Order of the Phoenix, Fawkes saves Dumbledore's life by swallowing a killing curse from Voldemort. He then bursts into flame and is reborn from the ashes. The wands of both Harry and Voldemort contain a feather from Fawkes's tail. The phoenix is named after the 17th-century conspirator Guy Fawkes.
- Firenze – Centaur who becomes a professor of Divination in Order of the Phoenix. The character is based on Steve Eddy, Rowling's former English teacher, who attempted to discourage her from writing fantasy stories. Firenze is voiced by Ray Fearon in the film adaptation of Philosopher's Stone. Firenze has been compared to the centaur Chiron of Greco-Roman mythology.

=== G ===
- The Grey Lady – The ghost of Ravenclaw House. In life, she was Helena Ravenclaw, the daughter of Rowena Ravenclaw. After stealing her mother's diadem, she was killed by the Bloody Baron. The Grey Lady is portrayed by Nina Young in the film adaptation of Philosopher's Stone, and by Kelly Macdonald in Deathly Hallows – Part 2.
- Griphook – Gringotts goblin who is captured by Snatchers in Deathly Hallows. With the assistance of Harry and Dobby, Griphook and several other prisoners escape from Malfoy Manor. Griphook then helps Harry break into Gringotts in exchange for the Sword of Gryffindor, but he later betrays Harry and his friends. Griphook dies in the film adaptation of the novel. He is portrayed by Verne Troyer in the film adaptation of Philosopher's Stone and by Warwick Davis in Deathly Hallows Part 1 and Part 2.

=== H ===
- Hedwig – Harry's snowy owl, whom he got as a birthday gift from Rubeus Hagrid in Philosopher's Stone. She is killed in the Battle of the Seven Potters near the beginning of Deathly Hallows.

=== K ===
- Kreacher – House-elf belonging to the Black family. Kreacher was used by Voldemort during the creation of one of his Horcruxes. After Sirius Black's death, Harry becomes Kreacher's master. Although Kreacher is initially reluctant to serve Harry, he eventually becomes loyal to him and his friends. Timothy Bateson and Simon McBurney voice Kreacher in the films.

=== M ===
- Muriel – Great-aunt of the Weasley children on Molly's side. Dislikes Dumbledore but supports her family and the Order of the Phoenix during the Second Wizarding War. Matyelok Gibbs appears as Muriel in Harry Potter and the Deathly Hallows – Part 1.

=== N ===
- Nagini – Voldemort's massive snake that does his bidding. He communicates with her by speaking Parseltongue, the language of snakes. She is one of his Horcruxes. In Deathly Hallows, Nagini devours Charity Burbage, the Hogwarts Muggle Studies professor. Nagini is later placed inside the corpse of Bathilda Bagshot, which enables a surprise assault on Harry when he visits Godric's Hollow. Nagini is slain by Neville Longbottom during the Battle of Hogwarts. The prequel film Fantastic Beasts: The Crimes of Grindelwald reveals that Nagini was once a cursed woman who eventually transformed into a snake. The human Nagini is portrayed by Claudia Kim in the film.
- Nearly Headless Nick (Sir Nicholas de Mimsy-Porpington) – The Gryffindor house ghost. Being nearly headless, he is excluded from the Headless Hunt. He is portrayed by John Cleese in the first two Harry Potter films.

=== P ===
- Peeves – A mischievous Hogwarts poltergeist. Rowling has explained that Peeves is not a ghost, but rather an "indestructible spirit of chaos". Throughout the series, Peeves listens to only a select few individuals: Albus Dumbledore, the Bloody Baron, Nearly Headless Nick and Fred and George Weasley. The Hogwarts caretaker, Argus Filch, repeatedly tries to remove him from the castle. However, Rowling stated in an interview that not even Dumbledore would be able to remove Peeves from Hogwarts forever. Peeves was portrayed by Rik Mayall in the film adaptation of Philosopher's Stone, but his scenes were cut from the finished film.

=== R ===
- Madam Rosmerta – Proprietor of The Three Broomsticks in the village of Hogsmeade. Portrayed by Julie Christie in the film adaptation of Prisoner of Azkaban (2004).

=== W ===
- Winky – House-elf who belonged to the Crouch family.

== See also ==
- List of Fantastic Beasts characters
- List of Harry Potter cast members
- Magical creatures in Harry Potter
