= Harry Potter and the Half-Blood Prince (film) =

2009 film by David Yates

- Theatrical release poster
- Directed by: David Yates
- Screenplay by: Steve Kloves
- Based on: Harry Potter and the Half-Blood Prince by J. K. Rowling
- Produced by: David Heyman; David Barron
- Starring: Daniel Radcliffe; Rupert Grint; Emma Watson; Jim Broadbent; Helena Bonham Carter; Robbie Coltrane; Warwick Davis; Michael Gambon; Alan Rickman; Maggie Smith; Timothy Spall; David Thewlis; Julie Walters
- Cinematography: Bruno Delbonnel
- Edited by: Mark Day
- Music by: Nicholas Hooper
- Production companies: Warner Bros. Pictures; Heyday Films
- Distributed by: Warner Bros. Pictures
- Release dates: 7 July 2009 (Odeon Leicester Square); 15 July 2009 (United Kingdom and United States)
- Running time: 153 minutes
- Countries: United Kingdom; United States
- Language: English
- Budget: $250 million
- Box office: $1.008 billion

Harry Potter and the Half-Blood Prince is a 2009 fantasy film directed by David Yates from a screenplay by Steve Kloves. It is based on the 2005 novel Harry Potter and the Half-Blood Prince by J. K. Rowling. It is the sequel to Harry Potter and the Order of the Phoenix (2007) and the sixth instalment in the Harry Potter film series. It stars Daniel Radcliffe as Harry Potter, alongside Rupert Grint and Emma Watson as Harry's best friends Ron Weasley and Hermione Granger respectively. The film follows Harry's sixth year at Hogwarts as he finds a mysterious textbook, falls in love, and attempts to retrieve a memory that holds the key to Lord Voldemort's downfall.

Filming began on 24 September 2007, leading to the film's worldwide cinematic release on 15 July 2009. With an estimated budget of $250 million, it is one of the most expensive films ever made and the most expensive film in the Harry Potter film series.

Harry Potter and the Half-Blood Prince was released in 2D cinemas and IMAX formats in the United Kingdom and United States on 15 July 2009, by Warner Bros. Pictures. It was widely acclaimed by critics, with praise for the visual effects, character development, performances, darker tone, and faithfulness to the source material. The film was a major box office success, grossing $941 million worldwide, making it the second-highest-grossing film of 2009. It also grossed $394 million worldwide during its opening, which made it the highest worldwide five-day opening at the time. The film was nominated for many awards, including the Academy Award for Best Cinematography and the BAFTA Award for Best Production Design and Best Special Visual Effects. It was followed by Harry Potter and the Deathly Hallows – Part 1 in 2010.

== Plot ==
Lord Voldemort tightens his grip on the wizarding and Muggle worlds: his Death Eaters kidnap wandmaker Ollivander and destroy the Millennium Bridge. With Lucius Malfoy incarcerated in Azkaban, Voldemort chooses his son, Draco Malfoy, to carry out a secret mission at Hogwarts. Draco's mother, Narcissa, and aunt Bellatrix Lestrange seek out Severus Snape, who claims he is a spy in the Order of the Phoenix. Snape makes an Unbreakable Vow with Narcissa to protect Draco and fulfill his task.

Harry Potter accompanies Albus Dumbledore to persuade former Potions professor Horace Slughorn to return to Hogwarts. At the Burrow, Harry reunites with his best friends, Ron and Hermione. In Diagon Alley, they see Draco and Narcissa, and follow them into Knockturn Alley. The pair meet with Death Eaters, including the werewolf, Fenrir Greyback. When Harry believes Draco is now a Death Eater, Ron and Hermione are skeptical.

At Hogwarts, Harry discovers that his used Potions textbook is filled with notes and spells, added by the Half-Blood Prince. Using it, Harry excels in class, impressing Slughorn, who awards him a luck potion. Ron makes the Gryffindor Quidditch team as Keeper and begins dating Lavender Brown, upsetting Hermione, who harbours feelings for him. Harry consoles Hermione while acknowledging his own feelings for Ron's younger sister Ginny Weasley. Harry spends Christmas with the Weasleys. His suspicions about Draco are dismissed by the Order, but Arthur Weasley reveals that the Malfoys may be interested in a Vanishing Cabinet. Bellatrix and Greyback attack the Burrow in which Bellatrix boasts about killing Sirius Black.

At Hogwarts, Dumbledore asks Harry to retrieve Slughorn's memory of a young Voldemort; Slughorn has resisted giving an accurate memory. After Ron accidentally ingests a love potion intended for Harry, Harry takes him to Slughorn for a cure. After curing Ron, Slughorn offers Harry and Ron mead. Ron is poisoned after drinking it, and while recovering in the infirmary, he murmurs Hermione's name, causing Lavender to end their relationship. Harry confronts Draco about the poisoned mead, and also a cursed necklace that nearly killed Katie Bell. Harry and Draco duel, and Harry uses one of the Half-Blood Prince's curses that severely injures Malfoy, and he is only saved by Snape. Fearing the book contains Dark Magic, Ginny persuades Harry to hide it in the Room of Requirement, where they share their first kiss.

Harry uses his luck potion to convince the reluctant Slughorn to surrender the memory Dumbledore needs. Viewing it in the Pensieve, Dumbledore and Harry learn Voldemort sought information about Horcruxes, magical objects containing pieces of a wizard's soul for immortality. Dumbledore believes Voldemort divided his soul into six Horcruxes, two of which have been destroyed: Tom Riddle's diary (Note: As depicted in Harry Potter and the Chamber of Secrets (2002)) and Marvolo Gaunt's ring. They travel to a cave where Harry aids Dumbledore in drinking a potion that hides another Horcrux: Slytherin's locket.

A weakened Dumbledore apparates them back to Hogwarts, where Bellatrix, Greyback, and the other Death Eaters have entered through the Vanishing Cabinet in the Room of Requirement that Draco has secretly connected to Knockturn Alley. As Harry hides, Draco appears and disarms Dumbledore, revealing that Voldemort chose him to kill Dumbledore. Draco hesitates; Snape arrives and kills Dumbledore with the Killing Curse. As the Death Eaters escape, Harry attacks Snape, and he reveals to Harry that he is the Half-Blood Prince.

As Hogwarts mourns Dumbledore's death, Harry tells Ron and Hermione that the locket is fake and contains a message from "R.A.B.", who stole the real Horcrux and intended to destroy it. The trio agrees to abandon their final year at Hogwarts, vowing to find and destroy Voldemort's remaining Horcruxes.

== Cast ==
- Daniel Radcliffe as Harry Potter: A 16-year-old British wizard who now enters his sixth year at Hogwarts School of Witchcraft and Wizardry
- Rupert Grint as Ron Weasley: One of Harry's two best friends
- Emma Watson as Hermione Granger: One of Harry's two best friends
- Helena Bonham Carter as Bellatrix Lestrange: One of Voldemort's principal Death Eaters and Draco Malfoy's aunt
- Jim Broadbent as Horace Slughorn: The newly appointed Potions master who had held the position before Severus Snape
- Robbie Coltrane as Rubeus Hagrid: The Hogwarts gamekeeper and Care of Magical Creatures teacher at Hogwarts
- Warwick Davis as Filius Flitwick: The Charms master and head of Ravenclaw
- Tom Felton as Draco Malfoy: Harry's rival and recipient of Voldemort's secret mission
- Michael Gambon as Albus Dumbledore: The headmaster of Hogwarts
- Alan Rickman as Severus Snape: The former Potions master, current Defence Against the Dark Arts teacher and head of Slytherin
- Maggie Smith as Minerva McGonagall: The Hogwarts Transfiguration teacher, deputy headmistress and head of Gryffindor
- Timothy Spall as Peter Pettigrew: The Death Eater who betrayed Harry's parents to Voldemort; Pettigrew has no lines in this film, but appears as a servant at Snape's house
- David Thewlis as Remus Lupin: A member of the Order of the Phoenix and Harry's ex-Defence Against the Dark Arts teacher
- Julie Walters as Molly Weasley: The Weasley matriarch and a mother figure to Harry

Gemma Jones returned to the cast as Hogwarts' matron, Poppy Pomfrey. Mark Williams plays Molly's husband, Arthur, who is a member of the Order of the Phoenix, while Natalia Tena plays fellow member Nymphadora Tonks. James and Oliver Phelps play Ron's siblings Fred and George and Bonnie Wright plays their sister and Harry's love interest, Ginny, while Devon Murray, Alfred Enoch and Matthew Lewis play Gryffindor students Seamus Finnigan, Dean Thomas and Neville Longbottom. Evanna Lynch plays Ravenclaw student Luna Lovegood. Katie Leung plays Ravenclaw student Cho Chang (who was Harry's former love interest). Jamie Waylett and Joshua Herdman play Slytherin students Vincent Crabbe and Gregory Goyle. Jessie Cave, Anna Shaffer and Freddie Stroma also play Gryffindor students Lavender Brown, Romilda Vane and Cormac McLaggen respectively, while Rob Knox plays Ravenclaw Marcus Belby. Helen McCrory plays Narcissa Malfoy, Draco's mother and Bellatrix's sister, while Dave Legeno plays werewolf Fenrir Greyback. Hero Fiennes Tiffin portrayed 11-year-old Tom Riddle, with Frank Dillane playing the 16-year-old version of him. David Bradley plays Hogwarts caretaker, Argus Filch. Louis Cordice and Scarlett Byrne play Slytherin students, Blaise Zabini and Pansy Parkinson.

== Production ==
=== Development and casting ===
Before David Yates was officially chosen to direct the film, many directors had expressed an interest in taking the helm. Alfonso Cuarón, the director of Prisoner of Azkaban (2004), stated he "would love to have the opportunity" to return. Goblet of Fire (2005) director Mike Newell declined a spot to direct Order of the Phoenix (2007), and was not approached for this film. Guillermo del Toro turned down the chance to direct the film in order to direct Hellboy II: The Golden Army (2008). Terry Gilliam was Rowling's personal choice to direct Philosopher's Stone (2001). When asked whether he would consider directing a later film, Gilliam said, "Warner Bros. had their chance the first time around, and they blew it." Yates was still working on Order of the Phoenix when he was approached to direct Half-Blood Prince. The producers were happy with his direction, and he was asked to start pre-production during the former's marketing.

Radcliffe and Grint were initially hesitant to continue, but agreed to reprise their roles. Emma Watson considered not returning for the film, citing fear of being typecast, but eventually decided that "the pluses outweighed the minuses" and could not bear to see anyone else play Hermione. Nicholas Hooper returned to compose the score; he included a reworking of John Williams's "Hedwig's Theme", which has recurred in all films. Other members like costume designer Jany Temime, visual effects supervisor Tim Burke, creature and make-up effects designer Nick Dudman, and special effects supervisor John Richardson continued for this film. Yates and Heyman have noted that some of the events of Harry Potter and the Deathly Hallows (2007) influenced the script of Half-Blood Prince.

Christian Coulson, who played the young Tom Riddle in Chamber of Secrets (2002), expressed interest in returning for the role in flashback sequences; but Yates responded that Coulson was too old (nearing 30) to be playing the role. Thomas James Longley was the original choice to take on the role, but Riddle was ultimately played by Hero Fiennes-Tiffin as a child and Frank Dillane as a teenager. Jamie Campbell Bower was in talks to portray the teenage Riddle before Dillane was cast; he would later portray a young Gellert Grindelwald in Deathly Hallows – Part 1 (2010) and Fantastic Beasts: The Crimes of Grindelwald (2018). Helen McCrory appears as Narcissa Malfoy, Draco's mother and younger sister of Bellatrix. McCrory was originally cast as Bellatrix in Order of the Phoenix, but had to drop out due to pregnancy. Naomi Watts was previously reported as having accepted the role, only for it to be denied by her agency.

Both Clémence Poésy and Chris Rankin, who had played Fleur Delacour and Percy Weasley, respectively, were interested in returning, but did not appear in the film. After Bill Nighy expressed an interest in appearing, Yates confirmed that Nighy would be his first choice for the role of Minister for Magic Rufus Scrimgeour. Scrimgeour's character was ultimately cut from the film, but Nighy appeared in his role in Deathly Hallows – Part 1. Bob Hoskins auditioned for the role of Horace Slughorn, but Jim Broadbent ultimately secured the part. Warner Bros. and MSN also ran an online Order of the Phoenix quiz, with the prize being a walk-on part in Half-Blood Prince.

=== Sets ===
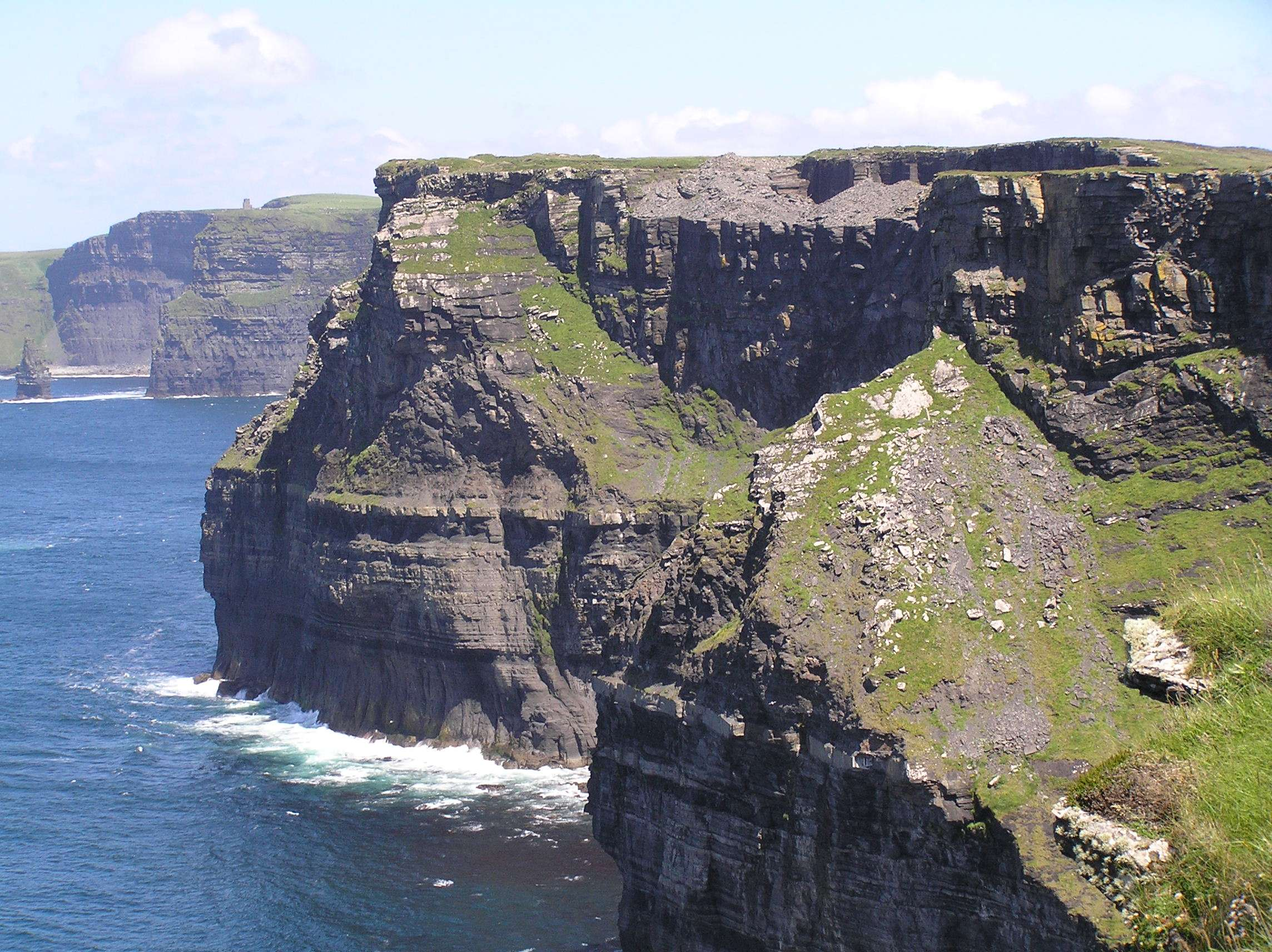
The Cliffs of Moher were used as the exterior of the Horcrux Cave.

Stuart Craig, the production designer of the first five films, stayed on to design all the sets in Half-Blood Prince. Several new sets were introduced, including Tom Riddle's orphanage, the Astronomy Tower, and the cave. Craig noted that the film used several CGI sets, noticeably the interior of the cave where Harry and Dumbledore both go to hunt Horcruxes. The exterior of the scene was filmed at the Cliffs of Moher in the west of Ireland. The interior of the cave is made up of geometric crystal formations. Radcliffe said that the scene took three-to-four months to prepare. Some of the Hogwarts sets were taken down after the filming, as they would not be used for the following film.

=== Filming ===
Before filming began, there was belief that filming might move from the UK, where all previous films were shot. The crew also scouted around Cape Wrath in Scotland, for use in the cave scene. Filming returned to Glen Coe and Glenfinnan, both of which have appeared in the previous films, to preserve the continuity of the landscape.

Following a week of rehearsals, principal photography began on 24 September 2007 and ended on 17 May 2008. Radcliffe, Gambon and Broadbent started shooting in late September 2007. Other cast members started much later: Grint did not begin until November 2007; Watson started in December 2007, Rickman and Leung in January 2008, and Bonham Carter in February 2008.

On the weekend of 6 October 2007, the crew shot scenes involving the Hogwarts Express in the misty and dewy environment of Fort William, Scotland. A series of night scenes were filmed in the village of Lacock and the cloisters at Lacock Abbey for three nights starting 25 October 2007. Filming took place from 5 pm to 5 am daily, and residents of the street were asked to black out their windows with dark blinds. On set reports indicated that the main scene filmed was Harry and Dumbledore's visit to Slughorn's house. Further filming took place in Surbiton railway station in October 2007, at Gloucester Cathedral, where Philosopher's Stone and Chamber of Secrets were shot, in February 2008, and at the Millennium Bridge in London in March 2008.

In the previous films, the scenes showing Hogwarts Express on its way to the wizarding school were typically shot in Scotland. However, since the screenplay required a snowy atmosphere for the train to go through and it did not snow during planned production dates, the crew decided to film these scenes in Rauma Line, Norway. This included the scene where Harry and Ron are talking about the Unbreakable Vow Snape had to swear to as the train goes through a snowy plot. The filming location in the Norwegian mountains was close to the village of Bjorli in Innlandet county.

=== Cinematography ===
Due to cinematographer Bruno Delbonnel's use of de-focussing and soft wipes in the digital grade, Warner Bros. asked director David Yates to add more colours to the film. Yates did not want to lose the "very European look" of the film, but after retouching the picture, he said, "It's not what you wanted, but we're happy with it." After five minutes of watching the film, the studio were pleased with the changes. In an interview with Total Film, Yates said that the choice of angles, the extreme close-ups, and the pacing of the scenes made the film "incredibly rich".

One of the major challenges for Delbonnel was the lighting of the film. In an interview with the academy, Delbonnel said that he did not want to change the lighting effects used in the previous films, and finally decided to give it a darker, moody variation of grey. Yates and the other producers supported this new effect, and he went ahead with it. In reference to the cave scene, Delbonnel said, "I wanted to have some kind of 'dynamism' with the light. I thought it could be interesting and more dramatic if the light was floating, circling above the characters faces: sometimes lighting them, sometimes hiding them in a very random and unpredictable way."

=== Visual effects ===
The opening scenes of the Death Eaters' attack on Diagon Alley and London was created by Double Negative, led by VFX supervisor Paul Franklin. Double Negative spent six months surveying and documenting the environment around the River Thames and Trafalgar Square to create the swooping views of the city. Double Negative also contributed to the Pensieve sequences, developing complex directed fluid simulations to realise the swirling world of memory and the past.

Tim Burke and Tim Alexander were the visual effects supervisors for the rest of the film. Tim Alexander said that completing the Inferi-attack scene took several months. He said that the scene was much bolder and scarier compared to previous films, and director Yates wanted to avoid making them look like zombies. On differentiating them, he commented, "A lot of it came down to their movement – they don't move fast, but they don't move really slow or groan and moan. We ended up going with a very realistic style." He also noted that Inferi are skinnier than zombies, waterlogged and grey.

On Dumbledore's ring of fire to combat the Inferi, he added that research was done on molten volcanoes, among other references. He said, "The visual effects team emulated these six fire parameters: heat ripples, smoke, buoyancy, viscosity, opacity, and brightness." Since the scene was very time-consuming, computer-graphics artist Chris Horvath spent eight months finding a faster way to conjure the flames. Eventually, the final effect would look as though someone sprayed propane and then lit it.

Half-Blood Prince was the last film in the series to include participation from visual effects company Industrial Light & Magic.

=== Music ===
The film's score was composed by Nicholas Hooper, who also composed the music for Harry Potter and the Order of the Phoenix. The soundtrack was released on an Audio CD format on 14 July 2009, a day before the film was released in cinemas.

The album debuted at number twenty-nine on the Billboard 200 chart, thus making it the highest-charting soundtrack among all the six movie soundtracks released. It was nominated for Best Score Soundtrack Album for a Motion Picture, Television or Other Visual Media at the 52nd Annual Grammy Awards.

== Differences from the book ==
Half-Blood Prince added or changed several events in the literary canon. The book begins with a scene involving the Muggle Prime Minister. Yates and his crew debated over this scene, as well as the inclusion of Rufus Scrimgeour. They eventually revised the start of the film to instead include events described, but not seen in the book. Yates thought it would give the audience a feel for what the Death Eaters were doing if they showed the collapse of the Millennium Bridge rather than simply describe it (as was done with the Brockdale Bridge in the book).

As with Goblet of Fire, the Dursleys were cut, which Steve Kloves did to "break the pattern". Further background of Tom Riddle was removed, such as the Gaunts, because they felt it more important to concentrate on Riddle as a young boy, and an additional action scene at the Burrow was added to keep with the tone of the franchise. Yates felt that they needed "an injection of jeopardy and danger", and that without it, there was too much comedy and lightness. A small battle scene at Hogwarts which happened during the end of the book was also cut; Heyman commented that it was removed to "[avoid] repetition" with the forthcoming adaptation of the Battle of Hogwarts in Deathly Hallows – Part 2 (2011). Dumbledore's funeral was removed as it was believed that it did not fit with the rest of the film.

== Distribution ==
=== Marketing ===
Warner Bros. spent an estimated $155 million to market and distribute the film. The special-edition two-disc DVD for Harry Potter and the Order of the Phoenix contained two sneak peeks of the film, while the US edition included an additional clip. The first teaser for the film, with a length of 15-seconds, was shown alongside the IMAX release of The Dark Knight. The first full-length US teaser trailer was released on 29 July on AOL's Moviefone website. this trailer was shown alongside Star Wars: The Clone Wars in August 2008. An international teaser was released on 26 October and another teaser trailer was released later. Another trailer was screened on the Japanese TV station Fuji TV during a screening of Harry Potter and the Goblet of Fire on 18 January 2009. Scenes from the film were aired during ABC Family's Harry Potter marathon, which took place between 5 and 7 December 2008. On 5 February 2009, the first three promotional teaser posters were released, featuring Dumbledore and Harry. On 5 March and 16 April 2009, new trailers were released by Warner Bros.

As with the previous films, EA Games produced a video game based on the film. On 10 March 2009, it was announced that there would be a video game soundtrack, which was released on 17 March 2009. On 27 March, six character posters were released: Harry, Dumbledore, Ron, Hermione, Draco and Snape. A Japanese version of the international trailer was released, alongside the original one on 10 April. On 8 May, The CW aired a 30-second TV spot, which focused on the romantic side of the film. On 20 May, first clip from the film was released through The Ellen DeGeneres Show's official website, showing a love-struck Ron. Another clip of the film, showing Dumbledore visiting Tom Riddle's orphanage, was released on 31 May 2009, at the MTV Awards.

=== Theatrical release ===
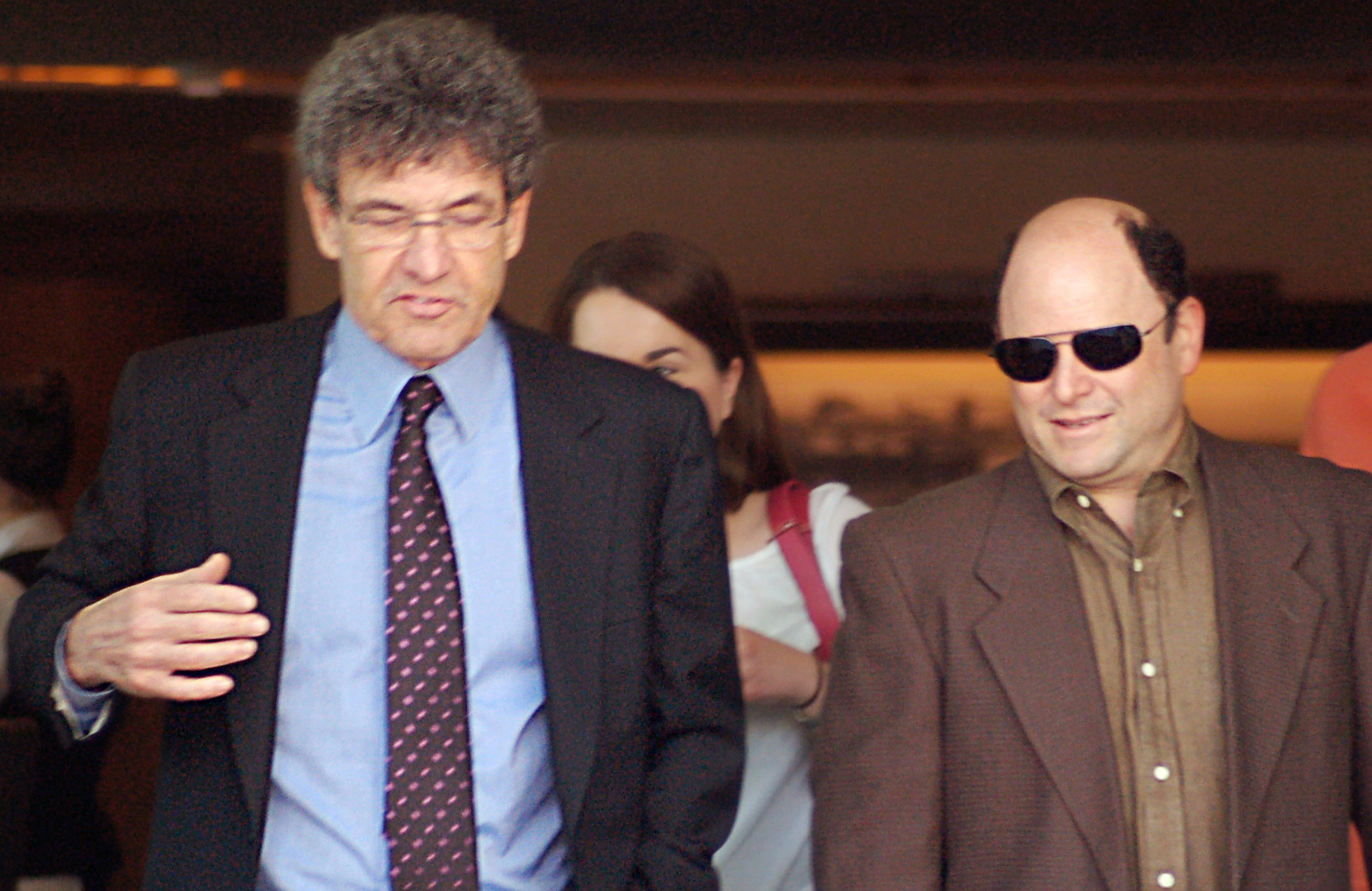
Alan F. Horn, the Warner Bros. president and Jason Alexander, May 2010

The film was released in many countries (Note: The list of countries in which the film released include the United Kingdom, United States, France, Belgium, Germany, Ireland, Italy, Sweden, Canada, Australia, Taiwan, New Zealand, India, Brazil, Spain, Mexico and Japan) on 15 July 2009. It was originally set to be released on 21 November 2008, but was pushed back by eight months to 17 July, despite being completed. Warner Bros. executive Alan F. Horn noted that the move was meant "to guarantee the studio a major summer blockbuster in 2009," with other films being delayed due to the 2007–08 Writers Guild of America strike. The box-office success of summer WB films Harry Potter and the Order of the Phoenix and The Dark Knight also motivated the decision. An unnamed rival studio executive told Entertainment Weekly that the move was to "stop next year's profits from looking seriously underwhelming after the phenomenal success of The Dark Knight," as "they don't need the money this year anymore." Dan Fellman, WB head of distribution, said that the studio had considered the date change for three to four weeks prior to the announcement, but gave it serious consideration a week before they came to their final decision. Three months before its release in July, the date was again changed by 2 days from 17 to 15 July, so it could open on a Wednesday like most tentpole summer movies.

The date change was met with a heavily negative reaction by Harry Potter fans, as the Los Angeles Times noted: "Petitions were circulating, rumors were flying and angry screeds were being posted on Internet sites within minutes of the Thursday announcement." The move was mocked by Entertainment Weekly, which had Half-Blood Prince on the cover on its "Fall Preview Issue". Despite each being owned by Time Warner Inc., Entertainment Weekly was unaware of the change until it was publicly announced by WB and noted that readers would now be in possession of a "Dewey Defeats Truman collectible". Several days after the announcement, Horn released a statement in response to the "large amount of disappointment" expressed by fans of the series. Following the date change, Half-Blood Prince's release slot was taken by Summit Entertainment's Twilight and Walt Disney Pictures' Bolt.

The sixth film was simultaneously released in regular cinemas and IMAX 3D everywhere but the United States, due to a conflicting agreement in which Transformers: Revenge of the Fallen was given a four-week window by itself in IMAX in that country. Therefore, the IMAX 3D version of the film was released on 29 July 2009 there. The film had been chosen to be screened at the 2008 Royal Film Performance on 17 November but was not shown. Cinema and Television Benevolent Fund chief executive Peter Hore noted he was "very disappointed" with Warner Bros' decision.

With a runtime of 153 minutes, Half-Blood Prince is the third-longest film in the series, behind Chamber of Secrets (161 minutes) and Goblet of Fire (157 minutes).

=== Home media ===
Like the previous films, a 1-disc and 2-disc special edition for the film was released on Blu-ray as a digital copy and DVD on 7 December 2009 in the United Kingdom, and 8 December 2009 in the United States. The Blu-ray and DVD include an 11-minute, 38-second feature on the new Wizarding World of Harry Potter mini theme park, which opened on 18 June 2010 at Islands of Adventure in Orlando, Florida. These also include deleted scenes, with a running length of 6 minutes and 31 seconds, and a sneak peek of the next Harry Potter movie, Harry Potter and the Deathly Hallows – Part 1 (2010). The Blu-ray and DVD of the film was also released in India, the Philippines, South Africa, Czech Republic and Israel on 16 November 2009. The Blu-ray and two-disc DVD editions in North America include a digital copy of the film.

In the United Kingdom, the DVD release became the fastest-selling DVD of the year, with an estimated 840,000 copies of the film sold in a few hours. In the US, the DVD made a strong debut at number one in both the DVD and Blu-ray markets, widely beating out any competition with sales of 4,199,622 copies. Worldwide DVD and Blu-ray sales of the film show that it is the fastest-selling film of 2009. On 14 June 2011, an Ultimate Edition was released simultaneously with the Ultimate Edition of the Order of the Phoenix film on both Blu-ray and DVD, containing new bonus features, documentaries and collectables.

== Reception ==
=== Box office ===
With an estimated budget of $250 million, it is one of the most expensive films ever made and the most expensive film in the Harry Potter film series. Advance ticket sales on Fandango.com for Half-Blood Prince surpassed advance ticket sales for Transformers 2 at the same point in sale cycles. It is also in MovieTickets.com's top 25 advance sellers of all time.

Harry Potter and the Half-Blood Prince broke the then-record for biggest midnight showings, making $22.8 million in 3,000 cinemas; The Twilight Saga: New Moon bested this with $26.3 million in November. Half-Blood Prince opened in the same Wednesday slot that Harry Potter and the Order of the Phoenix did in 2007. The film's box office run finished on 17 December 2009.

The film opened in 4,325 cinemas (rising to 4,455 three weeks later, becoming the largest number of cinemas until The Twilight Saga: Eclipse surpassed it with the 4,468 cinemas in 2010); and grossed $58.2 million on its opening day at the top of the United States and Canadian box office, the third-highest Wednesday opening of all time behind Transformers: Revenge of the Fallen and The Twilight Saga: Eclipse. It is also the nineteenth-highest single-day gross of all time and the third-highest for a film in the Harry Potter franchise behind Harry Potter and the Deathly Hallows – Part 2's $91.1 million and Harry Potter and the Deathly Hallows – Part 1, which made $61.1 million. It earned an additional $46 million overseas for a worldwide total of $104 million, breaking the record for highest single-day worldwide gross, previously held by The Dark Knight. By 20 July, the film had taken in $158.7 million in the US and $236 million from 85 other markets, for a worldwide tally of $394.7 million. This broke the record for biggest-ever worldwide five-day opening, surpassing Spider-Man 3's $381 million. In the US, it surpassed all of its predecessors by a wide margin, achieving the sixth-largest-ever five-day opening in that country. The film held this worldwide record for two years until it was topped by Deathly Hallows – Part 2 ($483.2 million). In the UK, the film grossed £19.75 million (equivalent to about $38.13 million), the highest opening for both the series and releases of 2009. At the end of the film's US and Canadian box office run, the total ticket sales of the film were $302.3 million; making it the third-most successful film in the franchise, after Harry Potter and the Deathly Hallows – Part 2 and Harry Potter and the Philosopher's Stone, as well as the third-highest-grossing film of 2009 in these regions behind Avatar and Transformers: Revenge of the Fallen. As with all of the previous films in the franchise, Half-Blood Prince proved to be extremely successful globally with an estimated non-US total gross of $632.1 million, totalling approximately $941.5 million worldwide. This made it the second-highest-grossing film of 2009, behind Avatar. It is the fifth-highest-grossing film in the franchise, behind Philosopher's Stone, both parts of Deathly Hallows, and Order of the Phoenix. It was once the eighth-highest-grossing film of all time.

In South Africa, the film opened with the number-one position, grossing $789,176; it maintained the number-one position during the second week, with a total of $242,336. In Australia, the film broke records with a debut of $11.5 million. Opening at number one, it maintained a second week at number one with a total of $5.3 million (down 54%), and grossed a total of $24.2 million. In France, the film debuted at $20.5 million from 949 cinemas. In Japan, the film held the top spot in the box office rankings until the release of Kamen Rider Decade: All Riders vs. Dai-Shocker, which took the top spot in its first weekend.

=== Critical response ===
On review aggregator Rotten Tomatoes, the film has an approval rating of 83% based on 280 reviews, with an average rating of 7.1/10. The website's critical consensus reads, "Dark, thrilling, and occasionally quite funny, Harry Potter and the Half-Blood Prince is also visually stunning and emotionally satisfying." On Metacritic, the film has a weighted average score of 78 out of 100 based on 36 critics, indicating "generally favourable" reviews. The film scored an 87 from professional critics at the Broadcast Film Critics Association; it is the first Harry Potter film to receive a Critic's Choice certificate. Audiences surveyed by CinemaScore gave the film an average grade of "A−" on an A+ to F scale.

The first review of the film came three weeks before the official release: Paul Dergarabedian of Hollywood.com ranked the film with The Lord of the Rings film trilogy and called the film a possible Oscar contender. He highly praised the performance of Sir Michael Gambon, Alan Rickman and Daniel Radcliffe. He commented, "Harry Potter and the Half-Blood Prince is a tour-de-force that combines style and substance, special effects and heart and most importantly great performances from all of the actors young and not-so-young". Another early review came from Devin Faraci of the UK tabloid Chud.com, who called the film the best in the Harry Potter series, and also in the year.

Andrew Pulver of The Guardian gave a positive review, scoring it 3.5 out of 5 stars. Todd McCarthy of the trade magazine Variety said that the film is "dazzlingly well made" and "less fanciful than the previous entries". He praised Alan Rickman's performance, described Helena Bonham Carter as "mesmerising", and Jim Broadbent as a "grand eccentric old professor". BBC News's Tim Masters praised the film's cinematography, visual effects, production design, acting and darker plotline. The Hollywood Reporter's Kirk Honeycutt felt that the film's first half is "jerky and explosive", but in the second half, the film finds better footing. He also praised Nicholas Hooper's composition, Bruno Delbonnel's cinematography, and Stuart Craig's set design. Chris Tilly of IGN UK commented on the length of the film, saying "while on occasion it drags, the 153-minute run-time never feels too long, thanks in no small part to the astonishing visuals and (largely) marvellous performances," and felt that it was the best film in the series.

However, Dave Golder of SFX Magazine found some aspects of the film to be a disappointment, mainly due to the large number of opportunities the director and screenwriter had sacrificed to devote "huge swathes of the film to subplots of Harry and his chums' teenage romances," but nevertheless found the film to be a large enjoyment, praising the performances of Broadbent and Rickman. Screen Daily commented, "David Yates and his team struggle to whip J.K. Rowling's 608-page tome into a consistently thrilling cinematic experience", but praised the shooting of some scenes and Bonham Carter's acting. David Stratton, of Margaret and David at the Movies, gave the film a 2.5 out of a possible 5 stars, remarking, "For non-readers [of the Harry Potter series] the films are now borderline incomprehensible", and that the film was "a little tedious" and "generally less interesting visually than its predecessors." He, however, praised the acting of Gambon and Broadbent.

=== Accolades ===
The film was nominated for BAFTA Awards in Production Design and Visual Effects, and was in the longlists for five other categories, including Best Supporting Actor for Alan Rickman. Bruno Delbonnel was nominated for Best Cinematography at the 82nd Academy Awards. The film was also one of the final seven contenders for Best Visual Effects. Half-Blood Prince is the only film in the series to be nominated for the Best Cinematography accolade at the Academy Awards.

Award	Category	Result	Recipient	Source
82nd Academy Awards	Best Cinematography	Nominated	Bruno Delbonnel	
Art Directors Guild Awards 2009	Excellence in Production Design For a Feature Film	Nominated	Stuart Craig	
63rd British Academy Film Awards	Best Production Design	Nominated	Stuart Craig; Stephenie McMillan	
63rd British Academy Film Awards	Best Special Visual Effects	Nominated	John Richardson; Tim Burke; Tim Alexander; Nicolas Aithadi	
2010 BAFTA Britannia Awards	Artistic Excellence in Directing	Won	David Yates (for Harry Potter films 5–8)	
31st BAFTA Kids' Vote	Best Film	Nominated	Harry Potter and the Half-Blood Prince	
2009 Digital Spy Movie Award	Best Family Film	Won	Harry Potter and the Half-Blood Prince	
2010 Golden Reel Award	Best Sound Editing: Sound Effects, Foley, Dialogue and ADR in a Foreign Feature Film	Nominated	Harry Potter and the Half-Blood Prince	
52nd Annual Grammy Awards	Best Score Soundtrack Album for a Motion Picture, Television or Other Visual Media	Nominated	Nicholas Hooper	
2010 Irish Film and Television Awards	Best Supporting Actor	Nominated	Michael Gambon	
2009 IGN	Best Fantasy Movie	Won	Harry Potter and the Half-Blood Prince	
2010 MTV Movie Awards	Best Movie	Nominated	Harry Potter and the Half-Blood Prince	
2010 MTV Movie Awards	Best Female Performance	Nominated	Emma Watson	
2010 MTV Movie Awards	Best Male Performance	Nominated	Daniel Radcliffe	
2010 MTV Movie Awards	Best Villain	Won	Tom Felton	
2010 MTV Movie Awards	Best Global Superstar	Nominated	Daniel Radcliffe	
2010 National Movie Awards	Best Family Movie	Won	Harry Potter and the Half-Blood Prince	
2010 National Movie Awards	Best Performance	Nominated	Rupert Grint	
2010 National Movie Awards	Best Performance	Nominated	Daniel Radcliffe	
2010 National Movie Awards	Best Performance	Nominated	Emma Watson	
36th People's Choice Awards	Favorite Movie	Nominated	Harry Potter and the Half-Blood Prince	
36th People's Choice Awards	Favourite Franchise	Nominated	Harry Potter	
36th People's Choice Awards	Best On-Screen Team	Nominated	Daniel Radcliffe, Rupert Grint, and Emma Watson	
2009 Phoenix Film Critics Society Awards	Best Live Action Family Film	Won	Harry Potter and the Half-Blood Prince	
2010 RAAM Awards	Film of the Year	Won	Harry Potter and the Half-Blood Prince	
2010 RAFA Awards	Alan Titchmarsh Show British Film of the Year Award	Won	Harry Potter and the Half-Blood Prince	
2010 RAFA Awards	Classic FM Film Music of the Year Award	Won	Harry Potter and the Half-Blood Prince	
2010 RAFA Awards	Best Use of UK Locations in a Film	Won	Harry Potter and the Half-Blood Prince	
2010 RAFA Awards	Film of the Year sponsored by The List	Nominated	Harry Potter and the Half-Blood Prince	
2009 Satellite Awards	Best Motion Picture, Animated or Mixed Media	Nominated	Harry Potter and the Half-Blood Prince	
2010 Saturn Awards	Best Fantasy Film	Nominated	Harry Potter and the Half-Blood Prince	
2010 Saturn Awards	Best Costume	Nominated	Jany Temime	
2010 Saturn Awards	Best Production Design	Nominated	Stuart Craig	
2010 Saturn Awards	Best Special Effects	Nominated	Tim Burke; John Richardson; Nicholas Aithadi; Tim Alexander	
2009 Scream Award	Best Fantasy Film	Nominated	Harry Potter and the Half-Blood Prince	
2009 Scream Award	Best Fantasy Actress	Nominated	Emma Watson	
2009 Scream Award	Best Fantasy Actor	Nominated	Daniel Radcliffe	
2009 Scream Award	Best Supporting Actor	Nominated	Rupert Grint	
2009 Scream Award	Best Supporting Actress	Nominated	Evanna Lynch	
2009 Scream Award	Best Villain	Nominated	Helena Bonham Carter	
2009 Scream Award	Best F/X	Nominated	Harry Potter and the Half-Blood Prince	
2009 Scream Award	Best Sequel	Nominated	Harry Potter and the Half-Blood Prince	
2009 Scream Award	Holy Shit! Scene of the Year	Won	"Death Eaters Attack London" Scene	
2009 Scream Award	Best Ensemble	Won	Harry Potter and the Half-Blood Prince	
2010 SFX Awards	Best Film	Won	Harry Potter and the Half-Blood Prince	
2009 Switch Live Award	Favourite Flick	Won	Harry Potter and the Half-Blood Prince	
2009 Teen Choice Awards	Choice Summer Movie: Action Adventure	Won	Harry Potter and the Half-Blood Prince	
2010 Teen Choice Awards	Choice Movie: Fantasy	Nominated	Harry Potter and the Half-Blood Prince	
2010 Teen Choice Awards	Choice Movie Actress: Fantasy	Nominated	Emma Watson	
2009 VES Awards	Outstanding Matte Paintings in a Feature Motion Picture	Nominated	David Basalla; Emily Cobb; Tania Richard	
2010 Young Artist Award	Best Supporting Actress	Nominated	Evanna Lynch	

== See also ==
- List of films about witchcraft
- London in film
