= Hogwarts: An Incomplete and Unreliable Guide =

Book by J. K. Rowling

Harry Potter books Hogwarts: An Incomplete and Unreliable Guide
- Author: J. K. Rowling
- Genre: Fantasy
- Price: £2.99 / US$3 / €2.99
- Publication date: 6 September 2016
- Pages: 84

Hogwarts: An Incomplete and Unreliable Guide is an e-book written by J. K. Rowling, a guide to Hogwarts and its secrets. It was released on 6 September 2016 in several languages at the same time.

== Publication history ==
This book was released at the same time as two others Short Stories from Hogwarts of Heroism, Hardship and Dangerous Hobbies and Short Stories from Hogwarts of Power, Politics and Pesky Poltergeists as a part of a series named Pottermore Presents. It was released on 6 September 2016 in several languages at the same time.

== Summary ==
In this guide, we find information about Hogwarts, Platform 9 3/4 and the Sorting Hat.

== Contents ==
- "King's Cross Station"
- "Platform Nine and Three-Quarters"
- "The Hogwarts Express"
- "The Sorting Hat"
- "Hatstall"
- "Hufflepuff Common Room"
- "The Marauder's Map"
- "The Great Lake"
- "Hogwarts School Subjects"
- "Time-Turner"
- "Hogwarts Ghosts"
- "Ghosts"
- "The Ballad of Nearly Headless Nick"
- "Hogwarts Portraits"
- "Sir Cadogan"
- "Mirror of Erised"
- "Pensieve"
- "The Philosopher's Stone"
- "The Sword of Gryffindor"
- "The Chamber of Secrets"
