= Jamie Waylett =

English former actor (born 1989)

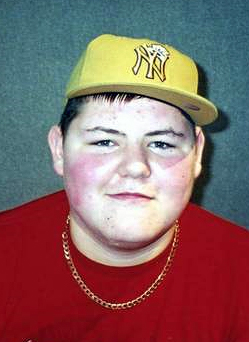
- Born: Jamie Michael Colin Waylett; 21 July 1989 (age 37); Kilburn, London, England
- Occupation: Actor
- Years active: 2001–2009
- Known for: Vincent Crabbe in Harry Potter
- Criminal information
- Status: Released
- Conviction: 2011 England riots
- Penalty: 2 years

Details
- Date apprehended: 20 March 2012

Jamie Michael Waylett (born 21 July 1989) is an English former actor. His only film role to date is that of Vincent Crabbe in six of the eight Harry Potter films. In 2012, he was imprisoned for two years for his participation in the 2011 England riots.

== Early life ==
Waylett was born in Kilburn, London, the fifth of six children born to Alan Waylett (born 1958) and Theresa Waylett (née De Freitas, born 1958). He lives in Camden, London. At the age of nine, he was hit by a car; he was expected to die or suffer severe brain damage, but surprised doctors by recovering full mental faculties.

== Career ==
While Waylett was a student at Emmanuel Primary School, his photograph was taken as part of a general auditioning process for the Harry Potter films. Initially considered for the part of Dudley Dursley, he was cast as Vincent Crabbe after an audition in front of director Chris Columbus.

In August 2009, his Harry Potter co-star Joshua Herdman announced that Waylett would not return for Harry Potter and the Deathly Hallows – Part 1, or for the final film in the series, Harry Potter and the Deathly Hallows – Part 2.

== Legal issues ==
On 7 April 2009, Waylett and a friend were pulled over by police. The officers then searched their vehicle, finding a "Crocodile Dundee" knife and eight half pound bags of cannabis. Images on a camera led police to Waylett's mother's house, where additional cannabis plants were discovered being grown. Waylett was charged a month later for possession of the drug. He appeared in court on 16 July and pleaded guilty to growing the plants in his mother's home, but claimed that they were for his personal use and not for distribution. On 21 July, he was sentenced to 120 hours of community service. He had previously been accused of using cocaine in October 2006.

On 14 October 2011, Waylett was arrested for his participation in the August London riots. The Metropolitan Police charged him with "violent disorder, having an article with intent to destroy or damage property, and receiving stolen goods". He was specifically accused of possessing a Molotov cocktail while looting a pharmacy in Chalk Farm, London. He was also charged with growing cannabis after police found fifteen plants during a search of his home. On 20 March 2012, he was sentenced to two years in prison for taking part in the riots.

== Filmography ==
=== Film ===
Year	Title	Role	Notes
2001	Harry Potter and the Philosopher's Stone	Vincent Crabbe	
2002	Harry Potter and the Chamber of Secrets	Vincent Crabbe	
2004	Harry Potter and the Prisoner of Azkaban	Vincent Crabbe	
2005	Harry Potter and the Goblet of Fire	Vincent Crabbe	
2007	Harry Potter and the Order of the Phoenix	Vincent Crabbe	
2009	Harry Potter and the Half-Blood Prince	Vincent Crabbe	

=== Television ===
Year	Title	Role	Notes
2002	The Saturday Show	Himself	1 episode
2004	Holly & Stephen's Saturday Showdown	Himself	1 episode
2004	This Morning	Himself	1 episode

=== Video games ===
Year	Title	Role	Notes
2007	Harry Potter and the Order of the Phoenix	Vincent Crabbe (voice)	
2009	Harry Potter and the Half-Blood Prince	Vincent Crabbe (voice)	
