= Josh Herdman =

English actor (born 1987)

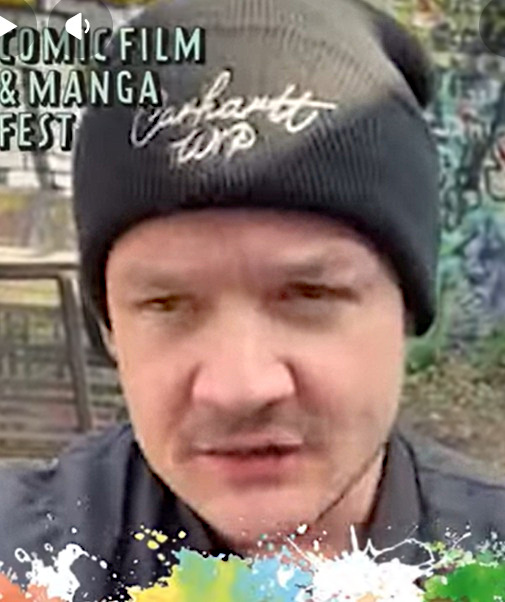
- Herdman in 2025
- Born: Joshua Colin Marian Herdman; 9 September 1987 (age 39); Hampton, London, England
- Occupations: Actor, mixed martial artist
- Years active: 2001–present
- Children: 2

Joshua Colin M. Herdman (born 9 September 1987) is an English actor and mixed martial artist, best known for playing Gregory Goyle in the Harry Potter film series.

== Early life ==
Herdman was born in Hampton, London. He is the son of actor and former professional rugby league player Martin Herdman and Jessica Herdman and the youngest of four brothers. He was educated at Orleans Park School.

Josh and his father Martin Herdman were involved in a motorcycle accident on 15 September 2015 in Hounslow while navigating a small roundabout. Their motorcycle skidded on oil and the two were thrown off, knocked unconscious and sustained injuries. Both were left waiting with police, who arrived shortly after the accident, for an ambulance for approximately 90 minutes after the accident. The police were reportedly unable to take them to a hospital in their cars due to the two men's injuries and a supposed lack of insurance coverage if something were to happen while en route. At some point, another ambulance had stopped and passed by but was unable to attend to them possibly because it had been full or was attending to another emergency. Eventually an ambulance arrived at 3:59 pm, almost an hour and a half after the accident, as other ambulances had been diverted to higher priority calls. They were taken to West Middlesex University Hospital. Martin suffered a torn ligament on his ankle and additional cuts and bruises.

== Career ==
Herdman started acting when he was about seven years old; his father found him an agent. At age 13, he was cast as Gregory Goyle, a sidekick of villain Draco Malfoy, in Harry Potter and the Philosopher's Stone (2001). Over the next decade, he returned as Goyle in all seven sequels. He was originally considered for the role of Dudley Dursley, Harry's spoiled cousin, but it went to Harry Melling.

Herdman appeared as Righteous in the 2018 film Robin Hood, alongside Taron Egerton, Jamie Foxx and Jamie Dornan.

After five years of practising jiujitsu, Herdman began his MMA career on 23 April 2016 in Romford with a decision win over Janusz Walachowski. He said, "I chose MMA because I love the sport. It's raw, exciting and unpredictable. I find it more interesting than boxing although I appreciate the beauty and art in boxing. It also made sense to move onto MMA because of my jujitsu training. I would like a few amateur fights first to get me started and see where it goes from there, who knows?" He said that he needed a change of scene after acting work had dried up.

== Personal life ==
Herdman has two sons.

== Filmography ==
=== Film ===
Year	Title	Role	Notes
2001	Harry Potter and the Philosopher's Stone	Gregory Goyle	
2002	Thunderpants	Damon	
2002	Harry Potter and the Chamber of Secrets	Gregory Goyle	
2004	Harry Potter and the Prisoner of Azkaban	Gregory Goyle	
2005	Harry Potter and the Goblet of Fire	Gregory Goyle	
2007	Harry Potter and the Order of the Phoenix	Gregory Goyle	
2009	Harry Potter and the Half Blood Prince	Gregory Goyle	
2010	Harry Potter and the Deathly Hallows – Part 1	Gregory Goyle	
2011	Harry Potter and the Deathly Hallows – Part 2	Gregory Goyle	
2011	The Estate Film	Skunk	
2012	Piggy	Anthony	
2013	Common People	Simon	
2016	Sink	Jason	
2017	Giantland	Jason	
2018	Robin Hood	Righteous	
2023	No Way Home	Jason	

=== Television ===
Year	Title	Role	Notes
2003–2005	UGetMe	Ben	Recurring role, 47 episodes
2004	The Bill	David Wilson	1 episode
2012	Wizards vs. Aliens	Steve	1 episode
2013	Coming Up	Eater	1 episode
2018	Marcella	Eric Davidson	Recurring role, 8 episodes
2020	White House Farm	PC Collins	Miniseries, 1 episode
2020	Alex Rider	Stan	1 episode
2022	The Man Who Fell to Earth	Terry	2 episodes
2022	Andor	Delivery Guard #1	2 episodes
