= Peridot (franchise) =

Augmented reality media franchise

- Created by: Niantic, Inc.
- Owner: Niantic Spatial
- Years: 2022–present

Miscellaneous
- First work: Peridot (mobile game)
- Latest work: Project Jade
- Media type: Video games; Augmented reality experiences; Therapeutic applications; Merchandise
- Key people: Asim Ahmed; Alicia Berry; Ziah Fogel; David Hollin; Will Jackson; Jessica Jung
- Platforms: iOS; Android; Meta Quest; Apple Vision Pro; Snap Spectacles

Official website
- playperidot.com

Peridot is a media franchise originally created by Niantic, Inc., and currently owned and operated by Niantic Spatial. The franchise centers on the care and diversification of virtual creatures called Peridots or "Dots" for short, utilizing augmented reality (AR) and artificial intelligence (AI) to allow these creatures to interact with users in the real world.

The franchise was initially revealed in April 2022 in the form of an AR pet simulation game for mobile devices. The franchise has since expanded across multiple other platforms, including web, mixed-reality headsets, and augmented reality glasses.

== Common elements ==
The Peridot franchise is built around several core concepts that are shared across its various media. The central figures are a species of magical creatures that have awakened after thousands of years. Each Dot is procedurally generated with a unique appearance, personality, and genetic code.

Interactions across the franchise emphasize nurturing and direct engagement with the creatures. Using augmented reality to overlay the Dots onto the real world, users are encouraged to care for their companions through actions like feeding, petting, and playing. A key theme is the bond formed between the user and their unique digital creature, fostering a sense of presence and companionship in the user's physical environment.

A fundamental technological pillar of the franchise is the use of artificial intelligence to enhance the illusion that the Dots are living beings. Across all platforms, AI is used to drive the creatures' behaviors, allowing them to interact with the user and their environment in a way that feels dynamic and intelligent. This focus on AI-driven behavior is a core component designed to make the Dots feel like true digital companions.

=== Lore and Mythology ===
The franchise's lore is detailed in The Peridoctus, an in-universe bestiary chronicling the history of the Peridot species from the perspective of historian Fasciana de Saggia. The narrative begins with the origin of the first Dot, Kee, and its foundational bond with a human keeper. This relationship establishes the world's central mechanic: a magical force called "whimsy," which is generated by human care and is essential for Dot survival. Widespread human neglect causes a loss of whimsy, leading to a mass hibernation of the species that can last for centuries. The lore also establishes a natural instinct for adult Dots to leave their keepers to find new habitats.

The society's history is chronicled through foundational events and fables of notable Dots, including the mischievous Olo , the uniquely winged Vida , and the glowing-horned Anza. A central legend is the final journey of the Kee, who traverses a mysterious stone path across the ocean and is canonized as the species' greatest explorer. The main narrative culminates in a cataclysm that destroys the Dots' homeland. A group of survivors, including the hot-tempered Dot Retto, are forced to escape by following Kee's legendary path to a new world.

In this new land, they discover a society where Dots are segregated and neglected by their keepers. This systemic neglect triggers the loss of whimsy, and the story ends on a cliffhanger as all the Dots, including the newly arrived Retto, succumb to a mass hibernation.

== Media ==
=== Peridot (mobile game) ===
The first title in the franchise, also known as Peridot, is an AR pet simulation game for iOS and Android devices, which launched globally on May 9, 2023. The game entered a soft launch period in select markets in April 2022 ahead of its worldwide release. In April 2026, Niantic Spatial announced that the mobile game would be shut down on August 31, 2026, just over three years after its global release.

Unlike many location-based games, Peridot is primarily experienced through the user's phone camera. It utilizes computer vision to realistically place Dots into the user's environment, enabling them to navigate around and be occluded by real-world objects. This technology also provides the Dots with a semantic understanding of their surroundings, allowing them to interact with things like flowers or bodies of water.

The core gameplay loop involves raising a Dot from infancy to adulthood through direct care and interaction, such as feeding, petting, and playing games like fetch. Outdoor exploration is also a key component; users can take their Dots on walks, complete quests, and discover real-world points of interest where they can breed their adult Dots with others to create unique offspring.

Post-launch updates have expanded on the game's AI capabilities. Generative AI was implemented to further enhance the Dot's intelligence, enabling more dynamic animations and allowing for more nuanced, conversational interactions with the user.

Peridot received "mixed or average" reviews, according to review aggregator Metacritic. Critics generally praised the game's visual design and the underlying AR technology. However, the game drew a lot of criticism for its monetization model. The monetization criticisms were later addressed by updates that alleviated several of these pinch-points.

=== Hello, Dot ===
Titled Hello, Dot, this version is an interactive head-mounted display experience that launched on Meta Quest in May 2024 and Apple Vision Pro in November 2024. Utilizing the mixed-reality passthrough capabilities of these headsets, Hello, Dot creates a more immersive experience than the mobile game. By integrating the virtual pet into the user's full field of view, it allows for direct, hands-on interaction with the creature through the use of hand tracking technology.

The experience on Meta Quest was significantly expanded in May 2025 with the introduction of a virtual, arcade-style contraption that serves as a central hub. From this machine, users can launch various minigames, such as "Dotball" and eating contests, to earn in-game currency for cosmetic items, such as outfits for their Dots. The expansion also added a generative AI-powered customization tool. This feature allows users to verbally describe a desired appearance for their Dot, which the AI then generates and applies as a custom pattern to the creature's skin.

=== Peridot Beyond ===
Peridot Beyond is an augmented reality glasses experience developed for Snap's Spectacles. It was announced and launched in September 2024 at the Snap Partner Summit and serves as a technology showcase for the franchise's application on wearable AR devices designed for outdoor use.

Unlike the mobile game or headset versions, the experience focuses on ambient companionship. Interaction is primarily driven by hand gestures, which allow the user to pet their Dot, play fetch, and guide it to forage for food. The experience also features a shared multiplayer mode, enabling multiple users to see and interact with each other's Dots, and can be connected to the Peridot mobile game, allowing actions in Peridot Beyond to earn rewards in the mobile app.

As the Spectacles hardware is not currently available for consumer purchase, the experience serves as a demonstration of the franchise's long-term vision for persistent, AI-driven companions on future consumer-ready AR glasses.

=== Project Jade ===
Project Jade is an augmented reality glasses demo developed for Snap's Spectacles. A glimpse of it was initially showcased in June 2025 at AWE in Long Beach and then later in full in October 2025 at Snap's Lens Fest event.

The experience focuses on highlighting Dot as an embodied AI, highlighting the convergence of four technological breakthroughs to give Dot senses: AR glasses (sight), geospatial AI (sense of place), multi-modal generative AI (intelligent brain), and conversational AI (empathetic voice). The same technology powering Dot in AR glasses can also be used to power robotics.

== Partnerships and related media ==
A collaboration with the weather application Sunnytune brought Peridot characters to the Apple Vision Pro in April 2024. The partnership integrated the Dots into the app, allowing them to react to real-time weather conditions displayed in the user's augmented reality environment.

In July 2024, the franchise became a central part of the "Make Green Tuesday Moves" initiative, a campaign focused on environmentalism by PlanetPlay. Users could purchase exclusive sustainability-themed in-game items in the Peridot mobile game with 100% of proceeds being donated to fight against climate change.

The franchise also partnered with the video game mental health charity Safe in Our World in October 2024 on an experience called Pause with Peridot. This initiative was designed to promote mental well-being by encouraging users to take mindful breaks and directing them to mental health resources.

In the healthcare sector, a partnership with Augment Therapy was announced in October 2024 to integrate Peridot characters into therapeutic AR experiences. The application is designed to make physical rehabilitation exercises more engaging for children and elderly patients by having them interact with their Dots while performing prescribed movements.

== Awards ==
List of awards and nominations for Peridot
Year	Award	Category	Result	Ref.
2023	Product Hunt	#1 Product of the Day (May 9, 2023)	Won	
2023	Pocket Gamer Awards	Best Family Game	Won	
2023	TOMMI Youth Awards	Apps (3rd Place)	Won	
2023	GamingonPhone Game Awards	Most Innovative Game	Won	
2024	AWE Auggie Awards	Best Game or Toy	Nominated	
2024	AWE Auggie Awards	Best Use of AI	Nominated	
2024	NYX Game Awards	Mobile Game - AR/VR	Won	
2024	VEGA Digital Awards	Apps & Software - Best Use of Augmented Reality	Won	
2024	VEGA Digital Awards	Apps & Software - Augmented Reality	Won	
2024	Webby Awards	People's Voice - AI, Metaverse & Virtual: Media & Entertainment	Won	
2024	Webby Awards	People's Voice - AI, Metaverse & Virtual: Experimental & Innovation	Won	
2024	Webby Awards	People's Voice - AI, Metaverse & Virtual: Technical Achievement	Won	
2024	Webby Awards	Games: Kids & Family	Nominated	
2024	AI Breakthrough Awards	Best Use of AI for Virtual Reality Gaming	Won	
2024	w3 Awards	Gold Award - Emerging Tech: Augmented Reality	Won	
2024	w3 Awards	Gold Award - Mobile Apps/Sites: Family & Kids	Won	
2024	Lovie Awards	Silver Award - Best Immersive XR Experience	Won	
2024	Lovie Awards	People's Lovie - Best Immersive XR Experience	Won	
2025	AWE Auggie Awards	Best Consumer App (for Hello, Dot)	Nominated	
2025	AWE Auggie Awards	Best Game or Toy (for Peridot Beyond)	Nominated	
2025	AWE Auggie Awards	Best Societal Impact (for Peridot franchise)	Nominated	
2025	Webby Awards	People's Voice - Best Headset Experience (for Hello, Dot)	Won	
2025	Webby Awards	Immersive Experience (for Peridot Beyond)	Honoree	
2025	Webby Awards	Best Use of Augmented Reality (for Peridot Beyond)	Nominated	
2025	Lovie Awards	Silver Award - AI Immersive: Experimental & Innovation (Snap x Niantic Spatial Peridot Beyond)	Won	
2025	Lovie Awards	People's Lovie - AI Immersive: Experimental & Innovation (Snap x Niantic Spatial Peridot Beyond)	Won	
2025	Lovie Awards	Bronze Award - AI Immersive: Best Partnership or Collaboration (Snap x Niantic Spatial Peridot Beyond)	Won	
2025	Lovie Awards	Silver Award - Best Immersive Experience (Peridot Beyond)	Won	
2025	Lovie Awards	People's Lovie - Best Immersive Experience (Peridot Beyond)	Won	
2025	Lovie Awards	Silver Award - Best XR Experience (Hello, Dot)	Won	
2026	Webby Awards	Best Immersive Technology Innovation (for Project Jade)	Nominated	
2026	Webby Awards	Best Use of AI Voice & Conversational Interface (for Project Jade)	Nominated	

== Development and history ==
Peridot was conceived and developed by Niantic, Inc. as a new, first-party intellectual property, with its initial reveal in April 2022. The global launch of the mobile game in 2023 established the core world and mechanics of the franchise which began to expand to new platforms throughout 2024.

In March 2025 it was announced that Niantic's games division, excluding Ingress and Peridot, would be sold to Saudi-owned Scopely. When the deal was completed in May 2025, the Peridot IP and its development team were transitioned to newly formed company Niantic Spatial, positioning the franchise as a flagship demonstration of the new company's AR and geospatial AI platform capabilities.

== See also ==
- Niantic Spatial
- Niantic, Inc.
- Tamagotchi
