= Brian McClendon =

American businessman (born 1964)

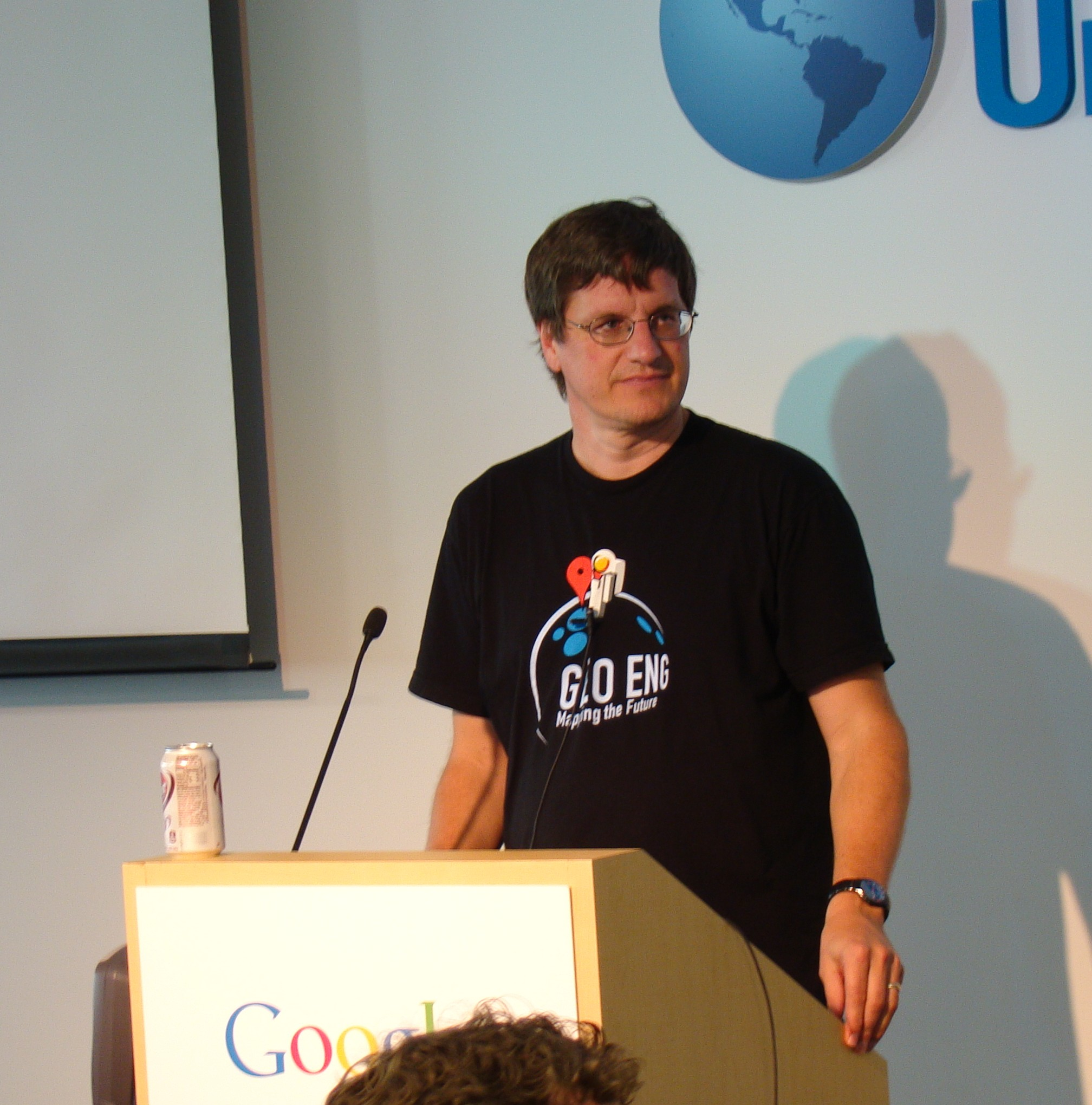

Personal details
- Born: 1964 (age 61–62)
- Party: Democratic
- Spouse: Beth Ellyn McClendon
- Education: University of Kansas, Lawrence (BS)

Brian A McClendon (born 1964) is an American software executive, engineer, and inventor. He was a co-founder and angel investor in Keyhole, Inc., a geospatial data visualization company that was purchased by Google in 2004 to produce Google Earth. Keyhole itself was spun off from another company called Intrinsic Graphics, of which McClendon was also a co-founder. McClendon was elected a member of the National Academy of Engineering in 2015 for strategic, technical, and managerial leadership resulting in widespread accurate and useful geographic information.

== Early life ==
McClendon grew up in Lawrence, Kansas. His childhood home, Meadowbrook Apartments in Lawrence, is the default center point of Google Earth. He graduated from Lawrence High School in 1982 and from the University of Kansas in 1986 with a degree in electrical engineering.

== Career ==
=== Early years ===
McClendon spent eight years with Silicon Graphics developing high-end workstation 3D graphics including GT, GTX, RealityEngine, and InfiniteReality, and then worked as an engineering director with @Home Network.

=== Keyhole ===
In 2001, he was one of the original investors in Keyhole, Inc., a software development company specializing in geospatial data visualization applications. He served as a board member and later joined the company as vice president of engineering.

=== Google ===
When Google acquired Keyhole in 2004, McClendon became a director of engineering for Google Geo, a team focussed on geospatial data visualization applications. He was later promoted to vice president, overseeing the Geo team.

Keyhole's main application suite, Earth Viewer, and Keyhole Markup Language (KML), formed the basis for Google Earth. Under McClendon's tenure, Google Geo products included Google Maps, Google Maps API, Street View, Google Local Search, Panoramio, Sketchup, Waze, Google Earth, and Google Earth Engine. Brian was also instrumental in the creation of Google Santa Tracker

=== Uber ===
He left Google to join Uber in June 2015 to work on mapping and machine learning.

=== Niantic ===
In November 2021, McClendon joined Niantic, Inc. as a senior vice president of augmented reality, research and mapping.

In May 2025, following Niantic's sale of its games business to Scopely, McClendon joined Niantic Spatial, Inc. as chief technology officer.

== Politics ==
In March 2017, McClendon resigned his full-time role at Uber, though remaining an adviser, in order to return to his hometown of Lawrence, Kansas, indicating an interest in politics. In January 2018, he announced his intention to run for Kansas Secretary of State as a Democrat. He ran unopposed in the primary election and was selected as the Democratic candidate. He was defeated in the general election by Republican candidate Scott Schwab.

== Teaching and philanthropy ==
McClendon maintains close ties with his alma mater, the University of Kansas, serving on advisory boards for both the School of Engineering and the Department of Electrical Engineering and Computer Science. He and his wife Beth Ellyn McClendon established the McClendon Engineering Scholarship at the university in 2007, donated computer tablets for electrical engineering and computer science students, and provided a Google Liquid Galaxy interactive display at the university's Eaton Hall.

In 2013, he served as grand marshal of the university's homecoming parade.

He currently serves as a research professor at the University of Kansas, having received an honorary doctorate in electrical engineering from the university in 2015. His research subjects include machine learning, autonomous vehicles, and world-scale mapping.

== Awards and recognitions ==
McClendon received an honorary doctorate from his alma mater, the University of Kansas, "for outstanding contributions to the fields of electrical engineering and computer science." He has been recognized by the United Nations as a Champions of the Earth in 2013, which is its top environmental prize, "for harnessing the power of technology to support conservation and green economic development."

McClendon holds 41 issued patents, including thirteen relating to KML, the XML-based language schema for expressing geographic annotation and visualization in two-dimensional maps and three-dimensional Earth browsers. KML became an open standard for GIS data in 2008.

== Depiction in media ==
- 2012: Maphead: Charting the Wide, Weird World of Geography Wonks by Ken Jennings
- 2012: On the Map: Why the World Looks the Way it Does by Simon Garfield
- 2013: On the Map: A Mind-Expanding Exploration of the Way the World Looks by Simon Garfield
- 2018: Never Lost Again: The Google Mapping Revolution That Sparked New Industries and Augmented Our Reality by Bill Kilday
- 2021: The Billion Dollar Code: The German Netflix drama about the creation of the Terravision program and the subsequent 2014 patent infringement lawsuit against Google, contains a fictional character called Brian Andersson which is a composite of McClendon and Michael T. Jones.

== See also ==
- Keyhole Markup Language
- Ronald Evans (astronaut)
- University of Kansas
