= Niantic Spatial =

American-based company

Niantic Spatial, Inc.
- Type: Private
- Industry: Artificial intelligence; Geospatial industry; Augmented reality; Spatial computing
- Founded: May 29, 2025; 17 months ago
- Founder: John Hanke
- Headquarters: San Francisco, California, U.S.
- Key people: Inhi Cho Suh (CEO); John Hanke, executive chairman; Brian McClendon (CTO); Thomas Gewecke (COO); Dennis Hwang (vice president)
- Website: nianticspatial.com

Niantic Spatial, Inc. (ny-AN-tik SPAY-shəl) is an physical artificial intelligence and spatial computing company headquartered in San Francisco. The company develops geospatial world models that gives machines understanding of the physical world through 3D reconstruction, visual positioning, and semantic understanding. They support enterprise customers in robotics, defense, and utilities.

The company was formed in May 2025 as a spin-off from Niantic, Inc., following the sale of Niantic's licensed games to Scopely (now operating as Scopely Explore). Niantic Spatial retained its original franchises Ingress and Peridot alongside its augmented reality and geospatial technology.

== History ==
=== Founding ===
The technology and team behind Niantic Spatial originated at Niantic, Inc., which was initially an internal startup at Google in 2010. As Niantic grew, the company evolved along two complementary paths: one focused on creating augmented reality location-based games and another dedicated to advancing AR, AI, and mapping technology.

On March 12, 2025, Niantic announced an agreement to sell its mobile games division for $3.5 billion to Scopely. The deal was finalized on May 29, 2025, and Niantic Spatial was spun out from the Scopely acquisition. Pokémon GO, Monster Hunter Now, Pikmin Bloom, and their companion apps were transitioned to Scopely while Ingress and Peridot were restructured under Niantic Spatial.

Niantic Spatial was initially capitalized with $250 million, consisting of $200 million from Niantic's balance sheet and a $50 million investment from Scopely. All of Niantic's original investors remained shareholders in the new entity.

Niantic Spatial's founding leadership team included John Hanke as chief executive officer, Brian McClendon as chief technology officer, and Thomas Gewecke as president and chief operating officer. Hanke and McClendon previously founded Keyhole which became the foundation for Google Earth and Google Maps. Gewecke was previously a senior business executive with tenure at Warner Brothers and Sony Music.

On March 30, 2026, Hanke appointed Inhi Cho Suh as chief executive officer, and Hanke transitioned to the role of executive chairman. He remains an executive of the company and continues to serve as chairman of the board.

=== Corporate history ===
In June 2025, Snap Inc. made an undisclosed investment in Niantic Spatial. They also announced a multi-year partnership which will integrate Niantic Spatial's scanning technology and VPS into Snap's ecosystem and focus on jointly building a next-generation AI map. In the same month Meow Wolf announced they are teaming up with Niantic Spatial to bring the Meow Wolf Universe globally anywhere in the world using Niantic Spatial's AR and VPS technology.

In September 2025, Aechelon Technology announced a partnership with Niantic Spatial to leverage its geospatial AI and reconstruction technology to enhance U.S. Coast Guard training by integrating real-world 3D scans into flight simulators. Later that month, Hideo Kojima announced teaming up with Niantic Spatial to redefine immersive entertainment by bringing Kojima Productions interactive storytelling into the real world using Niantic Spatial's technology.

In December 2025, geospatial intelligence firm Vantor partnered with Niantic Spatial to develop a unified air-to-ground visual positioning solution for GPS-denied environments.

In March 2026, autonomous delivery company Coco Robotics announced it was teaming up with Niantic Spatial to use its VPS technology to help its food-delivery robots navigate dense urban environments where GPS is often degraded.

In May 2026, drone-imagery company Spexi Geospatial partnered with Niantic Spatial to turn large-scale drone capture into geo-referenced, city-scale 3D models for use in physical AI.

In July 2026, ExxonMobil began piloting Niantic Spatial's VPS technology to transform how field technicians operate at its oil refineries. Later in July, robotics company Flexion AI, NVIDIA, and Niantic Spatial partnered to showcase how geometrically accurate 3D world models help close the sim-to-real gap in robotics simulation training.

== Technology and applications ==
=== Platform technology ===
Niantic Spatial's platform services are powered by a large geospatial model (LGM), the spatial counterpart to large language models (LLMs), designed to give machines a contextual understanding of space and structure. Their LGM is built on a proprietary database of over 30 billion posed images that help aid learning language models with spatial reasoning.

Niantic Spatial offers its Scaniverse platform across web and mobile devices, which transforms 3D capture of the real world into Gaussian splat reconstructions, meshes, and VPS maps. Capture can come from any camera sensor including mobile devices, 360° cameras, drones, satellites, and more. In July 2026, USDZ output was added to Scaniverse, making it easier to use these assets for robotics simulation training.

Niantic Spatial's localization technology focuses on positioning users, AI agents, and AR content in space. Niantic Spatial offers its Visual Positioning System (VPS) for precise positioning, orientation, and tracking for millions of pre-mapped locations and unmapped locations including GPS-denied environments.

In 2026, the U.S. government granted its reconstruction and visual positioning system awardable status on Tradewinds Marketplace and Army DevX Autonomy Marketplace, making it easier to procure the technology.

Niantic Spatial operates 8th Wall, a development platform that enables creators to build and publish interactive WebAR experiences. It provides a complete set of tools, including a cloud-based IDE and computer vision technology, allowing for the creation of immersive 3D and XR content that works across a wide range of devices without requiring an app. In November 2025, it was announced that after seven years of operation, 8th Wall would be shut down. Existing projects on the platform will remain available until the services are closed in early 2027. The majority of the 8th Wall platform was made open source in the first half of 2026.

=== Video games ===
Ingress, launched in 2012 and was reworked in Unity in 2018, then transferred to Niantic Spatial during its spin-off. Ingress is a global-scale version of capture the flag where players battle for control of virtual portals at real-world landmarks.

Peridot, another Niantic intellectual property, which includes a collection of products within its franchise, also transferred to Niantic Spatial during its spin-off. It is an AR and AI pet simulation game that launched on mobile devices in 2023. The next products are a mixed-reality experience on Meta Quest and Apple Vision Pro called Hello, Dot, and an augmented-reality glasses experience on Snap's Spectacles called Peridot Beyond.
