= Devar Entertainment =

American technology company

DEVAR Entertainment LLC
- Type: Private
- Industry: Augmented Reality
- Founded: 2011
- Founder: Anna Belova
- Headquarters: Marlton, New Jersey, United States
- Number of employees: 200
- Website: devar.org

DEVAR Entertainment LLC is an American technology company headquartered in Marlton, New Jersey, that specializes in the development of augmented reality content and products. The company was founded in 2011 and has branches in Cyprus, United States and Eastern Europe.

DEVAR raised $5 million in two venture rounds, including $2 million of seed funding in 2015 and the $3 million investment from Leta Capital in 2018.

The company developed a global augmented reality platform that allows publishers to enhance traditional books with interactive AR content and integrated audio.

In Q1 2019, it was included into the AR/VR/XR Leaders report by Digi-Capital.

== History ==
=== 2011-2014: Computer Vision Software ===
In 2011 Anna Belova, an entrepreneur included in Forbes' 30 under 30, and her friend, a businessman, Andrey Komissarov, established a web design agency specializing in software development, computer vision and CAM systems.

In 2014, the company was approached by representatives of a production plant manufacturing equipment and components for the nuclear industry. They requested the company to develop a CCTV system that could monitor nuclear reactors. The plant specialized in producing robots that could be launched inside a reactor and required software based on computer vision to enable them to read and transfer data on the reactor’s performance to the supervisors.

Later that year, at MIPIM, a real-estate exhibition in France, the company presented a mobile app that projected the future constructions right off the model. They also developed an animated Biology textbook and an atlas of the world fauna.

By the end of 2014, DEVAR Entertainment started to specialize in the development of mass market augmented reality products for entertainment and education.

=== 2015-2016: Mass Market Products ===
In 2015, the company entered the children's book publishing industry with their first augmented reality coloring book with a print run of 50,000 copies. The computer vision system identified a flat image and reproduced the colors that were used by kids on a 3D model located in the real-world environment. In January 2015, the team incorporated the DEVAR kids brand and registered DEVAR Media company. In 6 months, the company sold 500,000 copies of books in Eastern Europe.

In September 2015, DEVAR signed a partnership agreement with Hasbro for producing My Little Pony activity and coloring books with augmented reality. In 2016, the company extended its license with Transformers brand.

=== 2017-2018: Augmented Reality Platform ===
In 2017, the company presented new products in collaboration with Mattel and Rovio at Book Expo America 2017 in New York.

In 2018, the company received $3 million investment from Leta Capital. The funds were used to develop and launch an updated DEVAR app, an augmented reality platform for kids, that works with physical products and includes standalone digital content. The new app combines augmented reality, machine learning and artificial intelligence to analyze kids' age and their skill levels to provide them with suitable content. In Q1 2019, the company reported that the number of interactions with the content in DEVAR app has reached 13,646,603.

== Certification ==
DEVAR is a valid licensee and the member of ESRB's Privacy Certified Program.

== Technology ==
DEVAR develops and uses:

- SimAR marker tracking, which allows to detect plane based on the marker. It includes Image recognition and tracking and Multi-marker tracking.
- SimAR SLAM, an algorithm that scans a plane and allows to place virtual objects in real environment.
- ARMotion Gesture Catcher that uses real-time hand gesture recognition algorithm.
- High-resolution Capture of the Current Frame that allows capturing certain areas of the graphics in high resolution, including the use of the mechanisms of video stream interruption and resuming.
- SimAR 3D Reconstruction, which recognizes areas remaining beyond the field of view of the camera and displays them in real time.

== Projects ==
In 2019, DEVAR partnered with Eastcolight, a toy company from Hong Kong, to launch AR Human Anatomy Toys. The set includes six toys: brain, eye, teeth, lungs, heart and torso. They help children to memorize the internal parts of the human body by playing with the physical toys and interacting with them in augmented reality.

In May 2019, DEVAR partnered with Hasbro licensee, Bendon, to launch a series of four augmented reality My Little Pony activity books focused on one of the main characters: Home & Nature with Applejack, Party with Pinkie Pie, Sports & Games with Rainbow Dash, and Train Your Brain with Twilight Sparkle.

== Awards and nominations ==
In 2017, DEVAR's ABC 2.0 and Lost Civilizations books have become finalists of Auggie Awards at Augmented World Expo in the best game or toy category.

In 2018, DEVAR won Digital Book World award for the best use of AR/VR in publishing.

Human Anatomy Toys created in partnership with Eastcolight has become rose gold winner of Muse Design Awards 2019 and silver winner of A’ Design Award and Competition in Italy.

In May 2019, Human Anatomy Toys and Coding with Fourdi have become finalists of Auggie Awards 2019 in the best game & toy category.
