= Pokémon Go =

2016 mobile game

- Game logo
- Developers: Niantic (2016–2025); Scopely Explore (2025–present)
- Publishers: Niantic (2016–2025); Scopely (2025–present)
- Director: Tatsuo Nomura
- Producer: Steve Wang
- Designers: Matthew Ein; Junichi Masuda
- Programmer: Niantic
- Artists: Dennis Hwang; Yusuke Kozaki; Mieke Hutchins
- Composer: Junichi Masuda
- Series: Pokémon
- Engine: Unity
- Platforms: iOS 15+, Android 9+
- Release: July 6, 2016: NA/AU: July 6, 2016; DE: July 13, 2016; JPN: July 22, 2016; IND: December 14, 2016 (Note: See § Regional availability for exact release dates per region.)
- Genres: Augmented reality, location-based game

Pokémon Go (stylized as Pokémon GO and abbreviated as PoGo) is a 2016 augmented reality (AR) mobile game originally developed and published by Niantic and since 2025 by Scopely Explore, in partnership with Nintendo and the Pokémon Company, for iOS and Android devices. The game uses GPS to locate, capture, train, and battle Pokémon. It is free-to-play, featuring a freemium model that includes in-app purchases for additional in-game items. Pokémon Go launched with approximately 150 Pokémon species, with new species regularly introduced.

Upon its release, Pokémon Go received "mixed" or "average" reviews; critics found the experience enjoyable, but noted several technical issues. Despite this, it became one of the most popular and profitable mobile apps of 2016, amassing over 500 million downloads worldwide. The game is credited with popularizing location-based and AR technology, encouraging physical activity and social interaction. However, it has also faced criticism for causing accidents and public disturbances. Some governments raised security concerns and imposed regulations on its use. As of May 2018, Pokémon Go had over 147 million monthly active users and had been downloaded more than 1 billion times worldwide by early 2019. By 2020, the game had generated over 6 billion dollars in revenue. It is considered among the best mobile games of all time.

In 2025, Scopely acquired the game as part of a 3.5 billion dollar purchase of Niantic's gaming division.

== Gameplay ==
Players must explore the physical world to progress on the game map and discover PokéStops. These PokéStops are depicted as small circular objects, with their color changing depending on whether they have been spun (blue for not spun, purple for spun) to obtain items. Players can also find gyms, represented by large towers.

In augmented reality mode, players must "throw" a Poké Ball to capture a Treecko by pressing on the ball and flicking it up or making a curving motion towards the Pokémon, and then releasing it after the motion.

Players can customize their avatars after creating an account, with the option of keeping the default avatar. Avatars are displayed on the game map according to the player's GPS location. The map features "PokéStops" and "Gyms"; players can equip PokéStops with "Lure Modules" to attract wild Pokémon, including potentially rare ones. Gyms serve as battle arenas for team-based king-of- the-hill matches. These locations are typically at points of interest and originally adapted from Ingress portals. Some Gyms and PokéStops have been placed in problematic locations, such as the Korean Demilitarized Zone and the abandoned Bagram Air Force Base. Since 2019, player submissions have also been included in these locations, subject to review by other players.

Players' avatars move across the game map to reflect their real-world location as they explore their surroundings. Different Pokémon species appear in various regions worldwide, with Water-type Pokémon typically found near bodies of water. When players encounter a Pokémon, they can view it against a live-rendered background or in augmented reality (AR) mode. AR mode uses the camera and gyroscope on the player's mobile device to display a Pokémon as if it were present in the real world. Players can capture screenshots, called "Snapshots", of the Pokémon they encounter, regardless of whether the AR feature is enabled.

The game is free to play but offers in-app purchases for items such as Incense, Lure Modules, and Lucky Eggs, which enhance gameplay. These items can be purchased with PokéCoins or real money. Incense attracts Pokémon for 60 minutes, Lure Modules attract Pokémon to a PokéStop for 30 minutes, and Lucky Eggs double experience points for 30 minutes. Pokémon have Combat Power (CP), which measures their battle strength; higher CP Pokémon become more challenging to catch as players level up. The "Appraisal" feature helps users evaluate their Pokémon's strength.

=== Avatar customization ===
Players can customize their avatars' appearance with various clothing options that change based on the season, player level, and in-game sponsors or events. Clothing items include hats, accessories, tops, bottoms, socks, footwear, and bags. Many of these items feature references to specific Pokémon, teams, or regions. While most clothing pieces are free, some can be purchased with Coins. Players can earn Coins during select events, receive them as rewards for leveling up, or get them as prizes for completing Special Research tasks.

Players can further customize their avatars by selecting different poses. These poses can be gained for free, purchased, or earned as rewards. Some poses are exclusive to specific events and can only be obtained during their respective event periods. Once the event ends, there is no guarantee that the pose will be available in the game again.

In April 2024, Pokémon Go released an update that introduced enhanced customization options for player avatars. The update allowed players to choose from a variety of hairstyles, adjust their avatar's body size, and select from a broader range of skin tones. However, the update received backlash from players who criticized the new avatars for having lower-quality graphics compared to the previous models. Some players were disappointed because the update interfered with certain cosmetic items they had purchased in large quantities before and after the update.

=== Pokémon collection ===
In Pokémon Go, players do not battle wild Pokémon to capture them. Instead, they throw a Poké Ball toward the Pokémon by flicking it upward on the screen. Factors affecting the success rate include the Pokémon's catch rate, timing, and the type of Poké Ball used. After capturing a Pokémon, players receive Candy and Stardust as rewards. Candy is used for leveling up or to evolve Pokémon, while Stardust is used to increase a Pokémon's Combat Power (CP). Each Pokémon evolution line has its own type of Candy. The maximum player level was initially 40 but was raised to 50 on November 30, 2020. It was subsequently increased to level 80 following a leveling update on October 15, 2025. Players can transfer Pokémon to get more Candy and free up space in their collection. Shiny Pokémon can be found through various methods, such as chance encounters or special events like "Community Day". Many players aim to complete the Pokédex by catching and evolving all Pokémon. (Note: At the time of the game's launch, only 145 of the original 151 Pokémon were available to players, four of which are regionally exclusive: Farfetch'd, Kangaskhan, Tauros, and Mr. Mime are exclusive to East Asia, Australia, the United States, and Europe, respectively.)

In September 2016, Niantic introduced the "Buddy Pokémon" feature, allowing players to select a Pokémon from their collection to accompany their avatar during gameplay and earn bonuses and in-game items based on the chosen Pokémon. This feature was released later that month. Each Pokémon has a specific distance requirement that players must walk to earn Candy, with more Candy awarded for longer distances traveled. Niantic implemented a feature in the same update to block players using rooted or jailbroken devices from accessing the game to combat cheating.

On January 20, 2018, Pokémon Go launched the first Community Day, a monthly event that increases the spawn rate of a selected Pokémon and grants an exclusive attack to its final evolution if it is fully evolved during the event. Players also have a higher chance of encountering the Shiny version of the featured Pokémon. The inaugural Community Day featured Pikachu, which could learn the exclusive move Surf when evolved into Raichu during the event.

==== Pokémon availability ====
As of Nov 18, 2026, there are 959 Pokémon in the game, including regional variants, out of 1,028 in the entire Pokémon franchise. New Pokémon are regularly introduced to the game.

Regional Pokémon are often introduced simultaneously, such as the Unova region Pokémon and the Unova Stone item, both of which were released in September 2019.

During special events or quests, Mythical and Legendary Pokémon are often released individually or in groups. The first Legendary Pokémon to be released was Lugia in July 2017. Meltan and its evolved form, Melmetal, are the only Mythical Pokémon to have debuted in Pokémon Go. Their release coincided with the launch of Pokémon: Let's Go, Pikachu! and Let's Go, Eevee! on the Nintendo Switch. Pokémon Go initially introduced the new Mythical Pokémon Meltan as a teaser, later making it available for capture only through Pokémon Go using a "Mystery Box" obtained by completing new Research Tasks, transferring Pokémon from Pokémon Go to Pokémon HOME, or transferring Pokémon to Nintendo Switch Pokémon games.

In August 2020, Mega Evolution was introduced to Pokémon Go, allowing four Pokémon to Mega Evolve into five different forms. Since then, the feature has expanded to include 40 forms.

=== Battle system ===
==== Gyms and Raids ====
Players earn experience points (XP) by participating in various in-game activities. As they accumulate XP, they advance through levels progressively, unlocking new features. Notably, at level five, players gain access to Pokémon Gyms, where they can engage in battles. They must choose to join one of three color-coded teams: Team Valor (red), Team Mystic (blue), or Team Instinct (yellow). These teams compete for control over Gyms within the Pokémon Go world.

In June 2017, Niantic announced a revamp of Gym game mechanics to promote teamwork. Gyms were temporarily disabled on June 19, 2017, and the updated Gyms were introduced shortly afterward through an app update. The revamped Gyms now include a spinnable component (PokéStop) where players can collect in-game items such as Potions and Pokéballs. Each Gym can hold a maximum of six Pokémon, with the requirement that each Pokémon must be unique within that Gym. The coins earned now depend on how long the defending Pokémon remains in the Gym, replacing the previous 10-coin daily gym defender bonus per Pokémon. Legendary, Mythical, and Buddy Pokémon cannot be placed in Gyms.

In July 2017, Raid Battles were introduced, allowing players to team up and battle an over-leveled Pokémon in a Gym. If defeated, players can catch a regular version of that Pokémon. Raid difficulties range from Level 1 to Level 5, with Level 5 being exclusive to Legendary Pokémon. The first Legendary Pokémon, Articuno and Lugia, were released on July 22, 2017, followed by Moltres and Zapdos. From September to November, the Legendary Beasts Entei, Raikou, and Suicune were available, rotating monthly by region. Ho-Oh appeared in Raid Battles from November 27 to December 12, 2017. In August 2020, Level 3 Mega Raids were introduced, featuring Mega Evolution, while Level 2 and Level 4 raids were merged into Level 1 and Level 3 raids, respectively.

In May 2022, Raid Battles were updated to include Mega Legendary Pokémon, now rated at 6 stars—the highest level in the game. The exclusive Pokémon available in these raids were Mega Latias and Mega Latios.

In October 2022, a new type of raid battle called "Elite Raids" was introduced. These raids differ from regular raids in several ways. Elite Raids can only be battled in person, require a full day to begin, and are significantly more challenging, often needing a large group of players to defeat the Pokémon.

In May 2023, a new type of raid battle called "Shadow Raids" was introduced. These raids can be fought either in person or remotely and offer the opportunity to capture a Shadow Pokémon after defeating it. During the battle, the Pokémon may become "enraged", boosting its attack and defense; however, this can be reversed using a "Purified Gem". Before May 2025, trainers could only take part in Shadow Raids in person.

In February 2026, a new type of raid battle called "Super Mega Raids" was introduced. These raids differ from regular mega raids by having a new mechanic where every player needed a mega Pokemon to break the raid Pokemon's shield. These were introduced in 3 megas from "Pokemon Legends Z-A".

==== Trainer battles ====
In December 2018, Niantic introduced player vs. player (PvP) Trainer Battles. In January 2020, Niantic launched the Go Battle League, an online battle format that allows players to compete globally. Unlike the Trainer Battles introduced in 2018, the Go Battle League does not require physical proximity or real-world interactions between players. The game server automatically matches participants using a variation of the Elo rating system.

Go Battle League features three-on-three Pokémon battles in which players use fast and charged moves to defeat their opponents. Players can also switch between Pokémon during battles and use Protect Shields to block attacks. The league offers three major formats: Great League (CP 1,500 or lower), Ultra League (CP 2,500 or lower), and Master League (no CP limit).

The Go Battle League is a competitive feature in Pokémon Go. In October 2021, it was announced that Pokémon Go would be included in the 2022 World Championships. A qualification system called the Pokémon Go Championship Series was introduced. Trainers who reached a specific threshold in the Go Battle League qualified for the Championship Series. The top two players earned the opportunity to compete in the World Championships. Pokémon Go was also featured in the 2023 and 2024 World Championships.

==== Team Go Rocket battles ====
In July 2019, Pokémon Go introduced Team Go Rocket battles. Players can encounter Team Go Rocket NPCs at certain PokéStops or through Team Go Rocket Balloons that appear in the sky. After defeating them, players can capture a "Shadow Pokémon", which are lower-level Pokémon with a purple, shadowy aura reminiscent of the Shadow Pokémon from Pokémon Colosseum and Pokémon XD: Gale of Darkness. Shadow Pokémon receive a 20% boost to their attack but suffer a 20% reduction in defense compared to regular Pokémon. Players can choose to purify Shadow Pokémon, which increases their level and stats, allows them to learn an exclusive move, and requires fewer candies to evolve.

==== Dynamax and Gigantamax battles ====
In September 2024, Pokémon Go introduced Dynamax Battles and Dynamax Pokémon, a feature inspired by Pokémon Sword and Shield. Players can take part in these battles either in person or remotely by using a special currency called "MP" to join, with the required amount varying based on the battle's difficulty level. Up to four players can team up to battle a Dynamax Pokémon, building up a meter by attacking to Dynamax or Gigantamax their own Pokémon. Each Pokémon's Max Move, which deals increased damage and is exclusive to the Dynamax form, is determined by its regular Fast Attack type (except for G-Max Moves, which are specific to certain species). Players can also use Max Guard to boost defense and Max Spirit to restore health. If all Pokémon are defeated, players can use Max Cheer to boost the Max Meter. Only Dynamax Pokémon, Gigantamax Pokémon, Crowned Sword Zacian, Crowned Shield Zamazenta, and Eternatus are eligible for Dynamax Battles, and specific Pokémon can only be obtained in Dynamax form. Gigantamax Battles, introduced in October 2024, function similarly to Dynamax Battles but allow up to 100 players to participate in a single battle, divided into teams of four or fewer. Like Dynamax, only certain Pokémon caught from Gigantamax Battles can transform. Before August 2025, Gigantamax Battles supported up to 40 players in one battle.

== Development ==
=== Pre-release ===
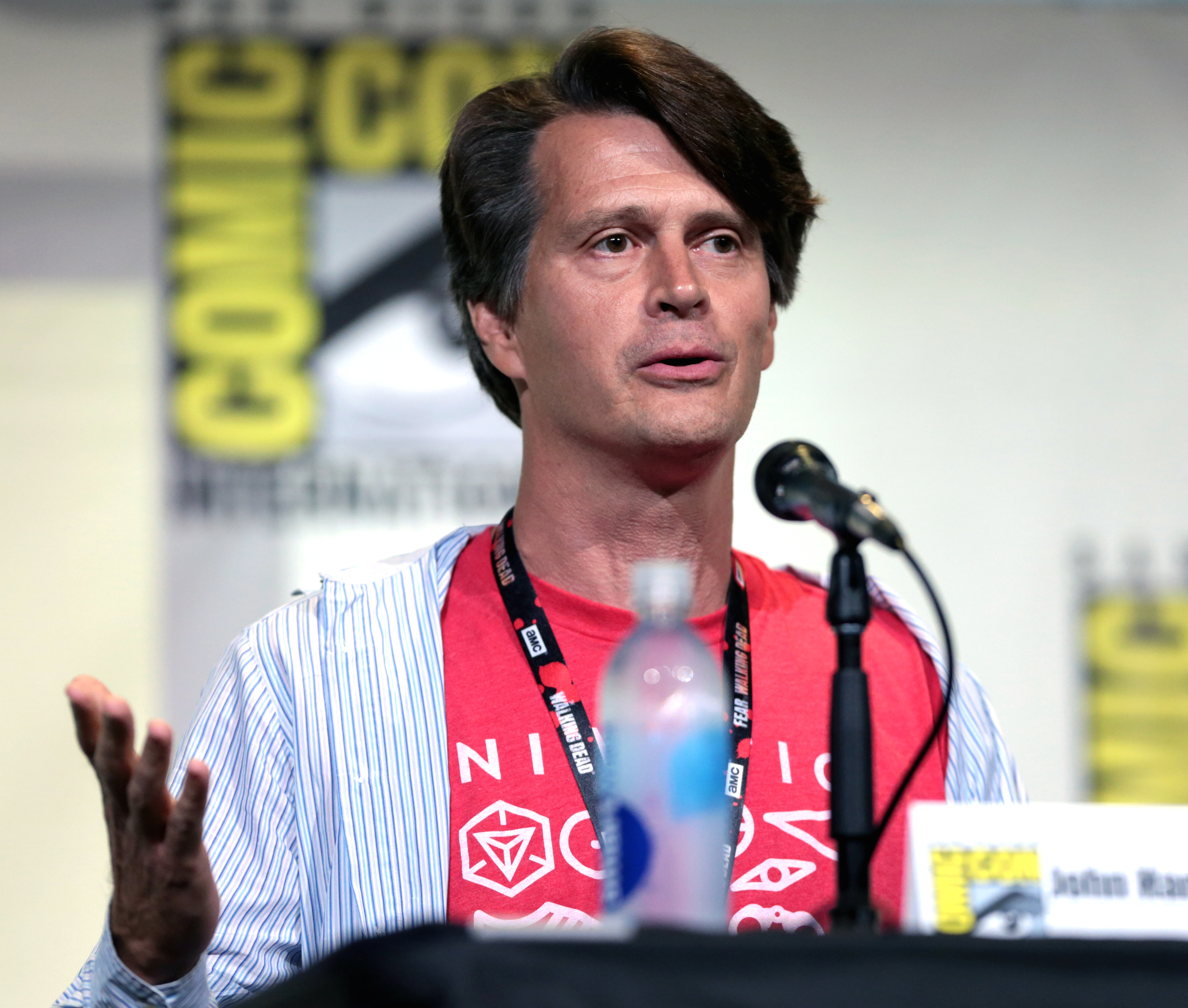
John Hanke, the founder of Niantic

The concept of Pokémon Go originated from the Google Maps: Pokémon Challenge, an April Fools' Day project released by Google Maps on April 1, 2014, that was created by Google engineer Tatsuo Nomura as a 20% project. Niantic founder John Hanke contacted Nomura in 2014 after seeing the demo and proposed building a Pokémon game playable in the real world in the style of Niantic's transreality game Ingress. Nomura subsequently introduced Ingress to Tsunekazu Ishihara of the Pokémon Company, who took to the game and saw the proposed Pokémon collaboration as a fit for the series. Niantic, a Google subsidiary, used crowdsourced data from Ingress to create PokéStops and Gyms in Pokémon Go, incorporated Google Maps data to determine Pokémon locations, and integrated map displays from OpenStreetMap starting in December 2017. The game's application logic is based on the open-source Kubernetes system, which faced challenges due to Pokémon Go's massive user base, leading to subsequent improvements. Niantic became an independent entity following Google's restructuring into Alphabet Inc. in 2015.

In 2015, Ishihara dedicated his speech to Iwata during the game's announcement on September 10, following Iwata's death two months earlier. Tatsuo Nomura, who transferred from Google to Niantic Labs in October 2014 after developing the Google Maps Pokémon Challenge, served as the game's director and product manager. The soundtrack was composed by Junichi Masuda, a longtime Pokémon series composer who also contributed to the game's design. Dennis Hwang, known for creating the Gmail logo while at Google, was one of the game's graphic designers.

On March 4, 2016, Niantic announced a Japan-exclusive beta test starting later that month, allowing players to help test and improve the game before its public release. The beta test was later expanded to other countries. On April 7, it was announced that the beta would extend to Australia and New Zealand. Subsequently, on May 16, 2016, signups for the field test opened in the United States. The test concluded on June 30, 2016.

=== Post-release ===
At the 2016 San Diego Comic-Con, John Hanke, the founder of Niantic, unveiled the three team leaders: Candela (Team Valor), Blanche (Team Mystic), and Spark (Team Instinct). Hanke mentioned that only about 10 percent of the game's ideas had been implemented. Future updates, such as the trading feature, additional Pokémon, Pokémon Centers at PokéStops, fixing the "three-step glitch", and easier training, were confirmed. Niantic committed to supporting the game for "years to come". In a TechCrunch interview in September 2016, Hanke hinted that player vs. player Pokémon battles would be added in a future update. In December 2016, Starbucks and Sprint partnered with Nintendo to add PokéStops and Gyms at select locations in the United States. An Apple Watch companion app was released the same month, allowing users to receive notifications about nearby Pokémon. In January 2017, an additional five thousand Starbucks locations became Gyms. In February 2017, an update introduced 100 species from the Johto region, expanding the original 151. The update also included new Berries, encounter mechanics, and avatar clothing options. Pokémon from Ruby and Sapphire were gradually added in late 2017, along with a weather system affecting spawns and gameplay. In November 2018, Pokémon: Let's Go, Pikachu! and Let's Go, Eevee! were released on the Nintendo Switch, featuring Pokémon Go-style catching and integration between the two games. A new Pokémon species, Meltan, debuted in Pokémon Go in September. Plans to introduce Pokémon from Diamond and Pearl were announced in October 2018, with Adventure Sync—a feature that records walking data in the background—revealed on October 25. Research tasks for Bug-type Pokémon, offering players a chance to catch Shedinja, were announced on October 26.

In a January 2019 interview with Business Insider, John Hanke stated that in 2018, Pokémon Go became the game Niantic had originally envisioned.

In response to the COVID-19 pandemic in 2020, Niantic implemented significant gameplay adjustments for players restricted from leaving their homes. These changes included indoor step tracking for distance challenges, long-distance player-versus-player battles, enhanced "Incense" effects, increased spawn points, and a doubled player interaction radius.

In May 2025, Scopely acquired some of Niantic's games, including Pokémon Go, while other Niantic games such as Ingress and Peridot were spun off.

=== Pokémon Go Plus and Pokémon Go Plus + ===
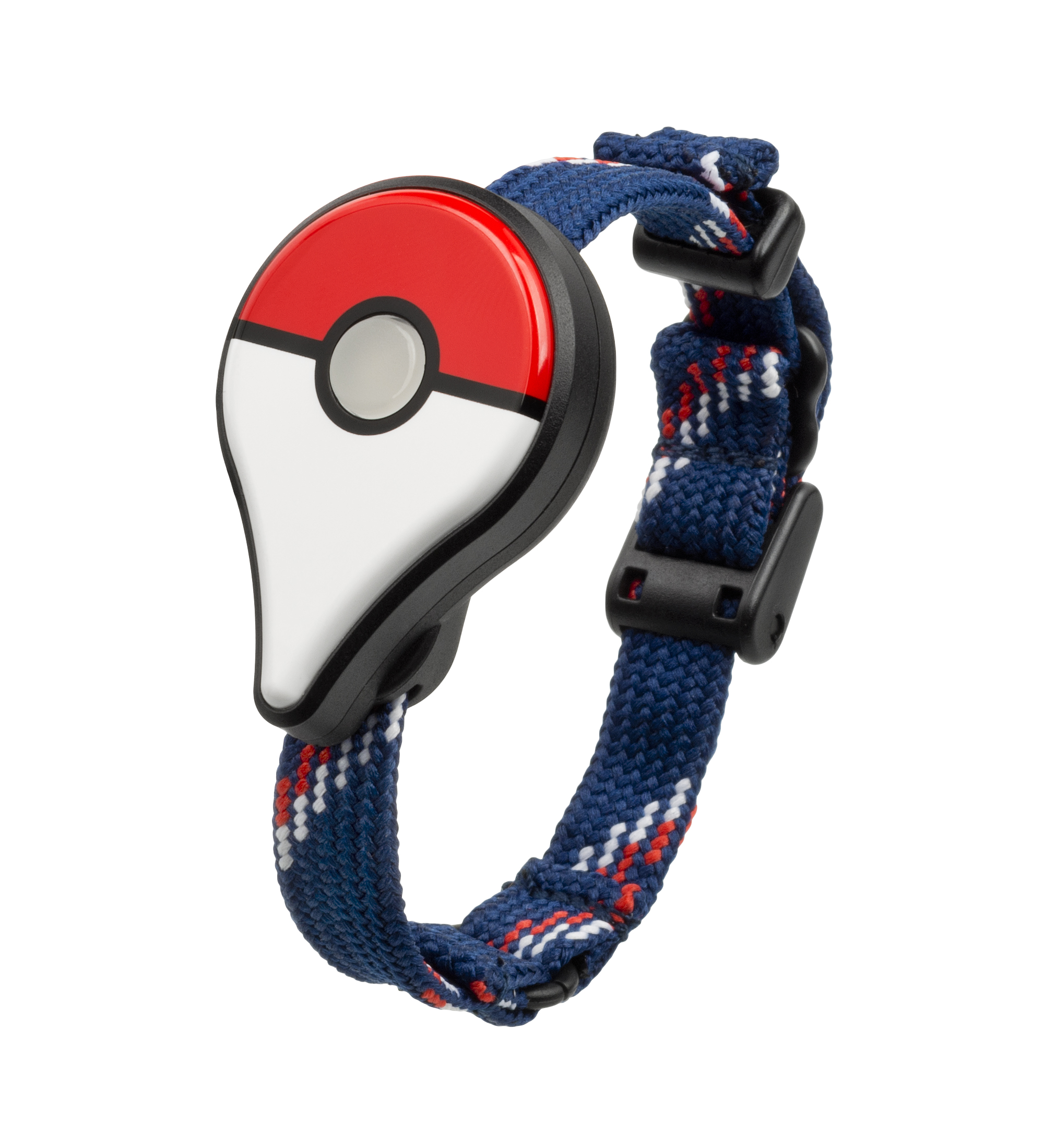
The Pokémon Go Plus, shown with its wrist strap

The Pokémon Go Plus is a Bluetooth Low Energy wearable device developed by Nintendo's Platform Technology Development division. It enables players to perform in-game actions without looking at their smart device. When near a Pokémon or PokéStop, the device vibrates, prompting the player to press the button to capture the Pokémon or collect items from the PokéStop. Players can only see what they have received when the next time they open the app on their mobile device. The design resembles a Poké Ball and the Google Maps pin. The decision to create this device, rather than a smartwatch app, was made to make it more accessible to players who find smartwatches too expensive. It was launched in the United Kingdom and North America on September 16, 2016. On July 14, 2023, the Pokémon Go Plus + was introduced as the successor to the Pokémon Go Plus, offering automatic Pokémon catching and PokéStop interaction, as well as sleep-tracking features for use with Pokémon Sleep.

== Release ==
=== Regional availability ===
Global release dates for Pokémon Go
Key	Date	Countries and territories	Ref.
	July 6, 2016	Australia, New Zealand, and the United States	
	July 13, 2016	Germany	
	July 14, 2016	United Kingdom	
	July 15, 2016	Italy, Spain, and Portugal	
	July 16, 2016	Austria, Belgium, Bulgaria, Croatia, Cyprus, Czech Republic, Denmark, Estonia, Finland, Greece, Greenland, Hungary, Iceland, Ireland, Latvia, Lithuania, Luxembourg, Malta, Netherlands, Norway, Poland, Romania, Slovakia, Slovenia, Sweden, and Switzerland	
	July 17, 2016	Canada	
	July 19, 2016	Puerto Rico	
	July 22, 2016	Japan	
	July 24, 2016	France	
	July 25, 2016	Hong Kong	
	August 3, 2016	Latin America and Caribbean islands	
	August 6, 2016	Brunei, Cambodia, Federated States of Micronesia, Fiji, Indonesia, Laos, Malaysia, Palau, Papua New Guinea, Philippines, Singapore, Solomon Islands, Taiwan, Thailand, and Vietnam	
	September 29, 2016	Albania, Bosnia and Herzegovina, Macau, North Macedonia, and Serbia	
	September 30, 2016	Kazakhstan, Kyrgyzstan, Mongolia, Tajikistan, Turkmenistan, and Uzbekistan	
	October 4, 2016	Benin, Botswana, Burkina Faso, Cape Verde, Chad, Côte d'Ivoire, Egypt, Gabon, Gambia, Ghana, Guinea-Bissau, Kenya, Liberia, Madagascar, Malawi, Mauritania, Mauritius, Morocco, Mozambique, Namibia, Niger, Rwanda, Seychelles, São Tomé and Príncipe, Sierra Leone, South Africa, Eswatini, Tanzania, Togo, Uganda, and Zambia	
	November 17, 2016	Bahrain, Israel, Jordan, Kuwait, Lebanon, Oman, Qatar, and United Arab Emirates	
	December 13, 2016	Bangladesh, Bhutan, India, Nepal, Pakistan, and Sri Lanka	
	January 24, 2017	South Korea	
	September 11, 2018	Russia (Note: Shut down in March 2022 due to the Russian invasion of Ukraine.)	
	June 3, 2021	Turkey	
	October 12, 2024	Saudi Arabia	

The official launch of the game began on July 6, 2016, in Australia, New Zealand, and the United States. Due to server strain at launch, Niantic CEO John Hanke announced that releases in other regions would be "paused until Niantic is comfortable" with fixing the issues. The Japanese launch, initially scheduled for July 20, was delayed due to a leaked sponsorship deal with McDonald's, eventually releasing two days later. The French release, originally planned for July 15, was postponed to July 24 following a terrorist attack in Nice on July 14. Third-party apps and websites were shut down in late July, reducing server strain and allowing Niantic to resume global releases. Central and South America, as well as a significant portion of Southeast Asia, received the game in early August. Indonesia became the first Asian country to have the game operational, although the official release in that region was on August 6.

In South Korea, Pokémon Go was not officially released due to restrictions imposed on online mapping data. However, a glitch allowed the game to function in a small area around Sokcho, in the northeastern part of the country, which was mistakenly considered part of Niantic's North Korea mapping region. This led to a surge in players taking advantage of the glitch. Bus tickets from Seoul to Sokcho sold out, and locals shared information about free Wi-Fi spots with tourists. Players even discovered a Gym in Panmunjom, near the Korean Demilitarized Zone, but Niantic later removed it. After the game's release in Japan, parts of Busan also became playable, as they were considered part of Japan's mapping area due to Tsushima Island's proximity. Pokémon Go officially launched in South Korea in January 2017.

In mainland China, Google services are inaccessible due to the Great Firewall, and the GPS feature in Pokémon Go is blocked by Niantic. Players in China must install the game using App Store IDs from different regions and use VPNs to access Google services required to load the game. Some players resort to GPS spoofing apps to bypass the GPS restrictions. Some have turned to a clone app called City Spirit Go, which appeared shortly after Pokémon Go's beta test in Japan. As of 2020, the official game remains unplayable in many parts of China due to the in-game GPS modules being blocked.

After its release on August 6, 2016, in Taiwan Pokémon Go quickly gained immense popularity. The high level of urbanization in Taiwan provided an ideal environment for the game's location-based features, attracting large crowds of players in cities such as Taipei, Taichung, Tainan, and Kaohsiung. Chen Ching-Po, also known as "Uncle Pokémon", gained recognition for attaching seventy-two smartphones with over twenty Pokémon Go accounts to his bicycle.

In August 2016, when the game was launched in Southeast Asia, Myanmar was initially excluded. However, users in Thailand discovered that the game was accessible in border cities near Myanmar. The game expanded to the Balkans, Macau, and Central Asia in September 2016. By the end of the year, it was also made available in Africa, the Middle East, and South Asia.

On September 11, 2018, the game was quietly released on Russia's App Store and Google Play Store, over two years after its initial launch. Niantic did not make an official announcement about this release.

In May 2019, the game was released on the Samsung Galaxy Store.

=== Commercial response ===
==== Nintendo ====
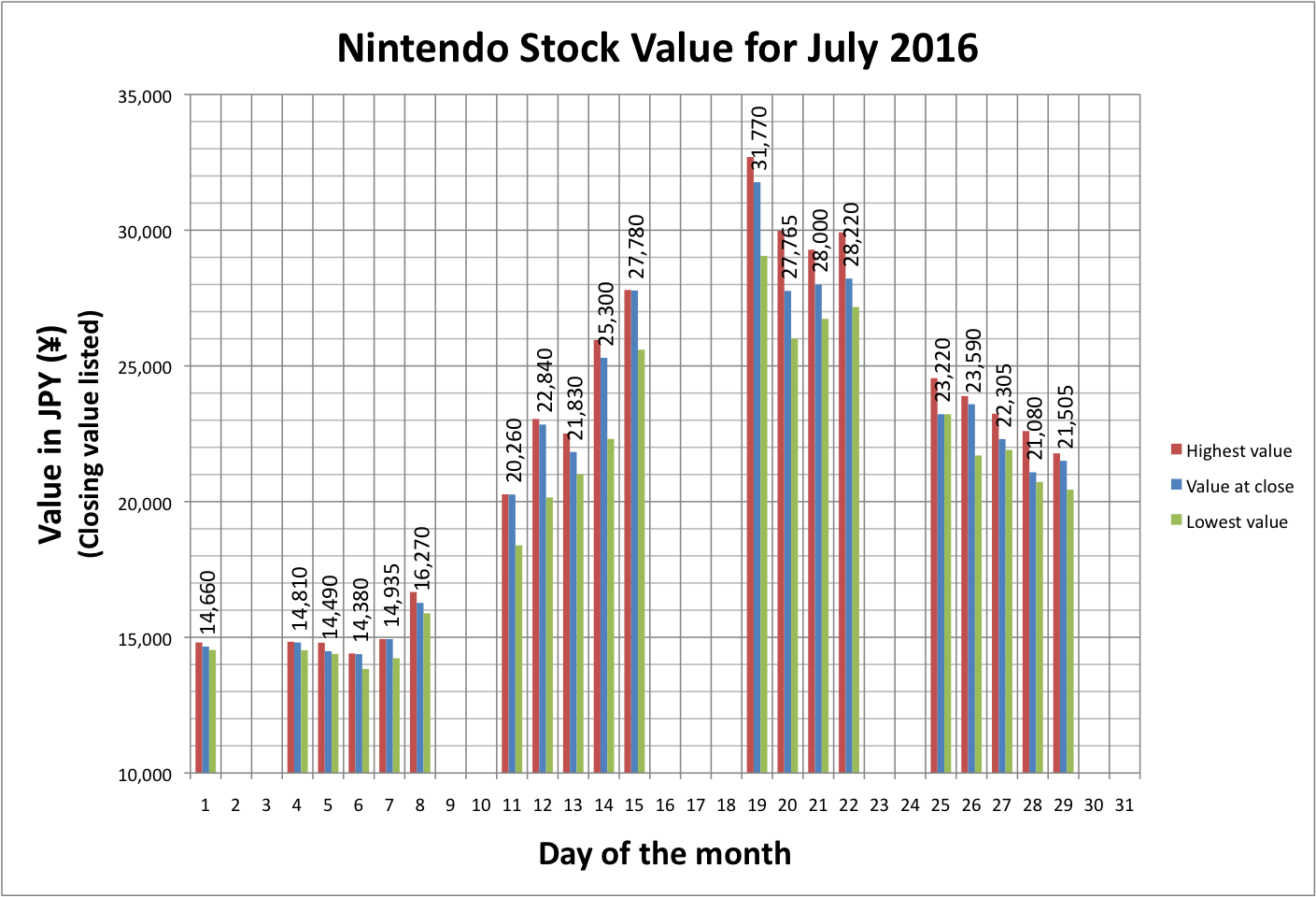
A graph of Nintendo's stock value in July 2016 depicting the surge in investment following Pokémon Go's initial release on July 7 and subsequent slump on July 25

Investors were buoyed by the response to the initial release of Pokémon Go on July 7, with Nintendo's share price rising by an initial 10 percent. By July 14, shares had increased by as much as 50 percent. Despite Nintendo owning only a 32 percent stake in the Pokémon Company and an undisclosed stake in Niantic, Nintendo's market value rose by 9 billion USD within five days of Pokémon Go's release. This trend continued for more than a week after the game's launch, and by July 19, the Nintendo's stock value had more than doubled compared to its pre-release level. Turnover sales reached a record-breaking ¥703.6 billion (6.6 billion USD), and trading of the stock accounted for a quarter of all trades on the Tokyo Stock Exchange's main board. The Financial Times suggested investors were speculating not on Pokémon Go itself, but on the potential success of future Nintendo app releases, as the company increasingly moves into the mobile app market—an area it had historically been reluctant to enter, fearing it would cannibalize portable console and video game sales. Nintendo planned to release four more smartphone app games by March 2017, and investors noted Pokémon Go demonstrated Nintendo still possesses some of the "most valuable character intellectual property in the world", with franchises such as Super Mario, The Legend of Zelda, and Metroid.

By July 22, Nintendo had gained ¥1.8 trillion (17.6 billion USD) in market capitalization since the game's release. However, after Nintendo clarified that it neither produced Pokémon Go nor had received significant financial gains from it, its stock fell by 18 percent—equivalent to a ¥708 billion (6.7 billion USD) loss in market value—on July 25. This marked the largest single-day decline for Nintendo since 1990 and reached the maximum one-day trading limit allowed on the Tokyo Stock Exchange. According to Macquarie Securities, the company holds an approximately 13 percent "effective economic stake" in the game.

==== Other companies ====
The stock surge was not limited to Nintendo; other companies such as Tomy, TV Tokyo, and the Bank of Kyoto also experienced substantial gains. Zagg, the owner of a battery case manufacturing company, saw its stock increase by 25% due to the popularity of Pokémon Go.

=== Technical issues ===
At launch, the game suffered from frequent server outages due to heavy usage. The global server usage expectation for the game was surpassed within 15 minutes of the game's release in Australia and New Zealand and peaked at fifty times the expected server traffic, or 10 times the expected worst-case scenario. Frequent crashes and authentication errors plagued the game's release and lasted for several days. For the first two days after launch, players could not access the game through their Pokémon Trainer Club accounts; only Gmail-based accounts could gain access to the game. Servers again suffered frequent outages in Australia on July 11; players blamed people in the United Kingdom for bypassing local servers and using Australian ones to play the game before its official release. On July 16, a few hours after the release in many European countries, the game's servers temporarily went offline. The outage was claimed by a hacking group called "PoodleCorp", who said they used a DDoS attack to shut them down, although the problem was fixed later that day. The next day, the servers went down again as the game was launched in Canada. John Hanke issued an apology for the server issues at the 2016 San Diego Comic-Con, stating, "we weren't provisioned for what happened".

Some early iOS installs of Pokémon Go required users to provide the app with full access to their Google accounts, allowing the app to "access players' Gmail-based email, Google Drive-based files, photos and videos stored in Google Photos, and any other content within their Google accounts". The Pokémon Company and Niantic responded to the concerns, recognizing that the iOS app "... erroneously requests full access permission for the user's Google account ...". However, Adam Reeve—the person who initially made accusations of the security issues in a Tumblr post—later backtracked on his claim and was not "100 percent sure" it was valid. Dan Guido, CEO of the security company Trail of Bits, analyzed the app's programming and discovered that although the game did request full account access, this did not enable third-party account usage, as initially conveyed. Guido found that this enabled Niantic to access people's email addresses and phone numbers unintentionally. A subsequent iOS app update reduced the scope of access. Niantic also issued a statement assuring users that no information was collected, nor was any information beyond what was necessary to use the app accessed.

Alongside server issues, Pokémon Go suffered from several glitches. One of the more prominent bugs appeared in mid-July 2016 and rendered the game's tracking feature useless. Normally, this feature shows between zero and three footprints to inform the player of their proximity to a nearby Pokémon; however, it universally became "stuck" at three steps, earning it the name "three-step-glitch". Niantic removed the footstep feature completely on July 30, sparking criticism from players. By August 1, players reported a new glitch that swaps their captured Pokémon with another one at random. Another bug, confirmed by Niantic in August, inadvertently made capturing Pokémon more difficult. Some Legendary Pokémon, which are rare and powerful versions of the creatures, were also obtained by players in a glitch, though they were later removed from the accounts of the trainers who got them to keep the game fair.

== Reception ==
Reception

Aggregate score
Aggregator	Score
Metacritic	69/100

Review scores
Publication	Score
4Players	50/100
Destructoid	3.5/10
GameSpot	7/10
GamesTM	7/10
Gamezebo	3.5/5
Hardcore Gamer	3.5/5
IGN	7/10
Jeuxvideo.com	18/20
Pocket Gamer	4.5/5
Polygon	7.5/10
The Guardian	2/5
USgamer	3/5

Edit on Wikidata

Pokémon Go was released to "mixed or average" reviews, according to review aggregator Metacritic. Upon release, critics called the experience enjoyable but noted the game's technical issues.

Critics praised various aspects of Pokémon Go. Oscar Dayus (Pocket Gamer) said that the game was an immensely enjoyable experience and added that "the very personal nature of catching Pokémon in your own neighborhood made me smile more than any game has for years." Jeremy Parish (US Gamer) compared the game and its social aspects to a massively multiplayer online game. Reviewers also praised the game for its promotion of physical exercise. Terri Schwartz (IGN) stated it was "secretly the best exercise app out there" and that it altered her daily walking routine. Patrick Allen (Lifehacker) wrote an article with tips describing how to exercise using Pokémon Go. Julia Belluz (Vox) said it could be the "greatest unintentional health fad ever" and wrote that one result of the game that the developers may not have realized was that "it seems to be getting people moving". Studies proved users took an extra 194 steps per day on average once they started using the app, while the most interested players took 26 percent more steps than usual. IGN named it the 100th best video game of all time in 2018.

Philip Kollar and Allegra Frank (Polygon) both agreed that Pokémon Go was "an exciting social experience", but were unsure how long the game and its popularity would last, stating it could either last for many years or "end up as a brush fire craze that the whole gaming world is talking about for a few weeks, and then it is forgotten".

Other critics expressed more negative views of the game, with many citing frequent crashes and other technical issues, as well as shallow gameplay. Kallie Plagge (IGN) said that although the game lacked polish and depth, the overall experience accounted for it. Matt Peckham (Time) criticized the game for its frequent crashes. Mike Cosimano (Destructoid) also took issue with the game, saying the original idea showed promise but was improperly executed. Kat Brewster (The Guardian) wrote that although she thought Pokémon Go was not a good game, it was "a great experience". The server problems also received negative press. Miguel Concepcion (GameSpot) said that although he enjoyed the game's strong social appeal and visual design, the game's "initial iteration is a buggy mess on all levels", with one reason being the constant server issues. Another glitch that appeared a few days after launch was the "three-step glitch", which made it impossible to "hunt down a specific Pokémon". Patricia Hernandez (Kotaku) said, "the three-step-glitch adds to what has been a terrible launch for Pokémon Go". Critics also emphasized the large gap between the rural and urban players. Rural players seem to be at a major disadvantage when playing the game, while city players have access to more PokéStops and Gyms.

=== Downloads and revenue ===
==== 2016 ====
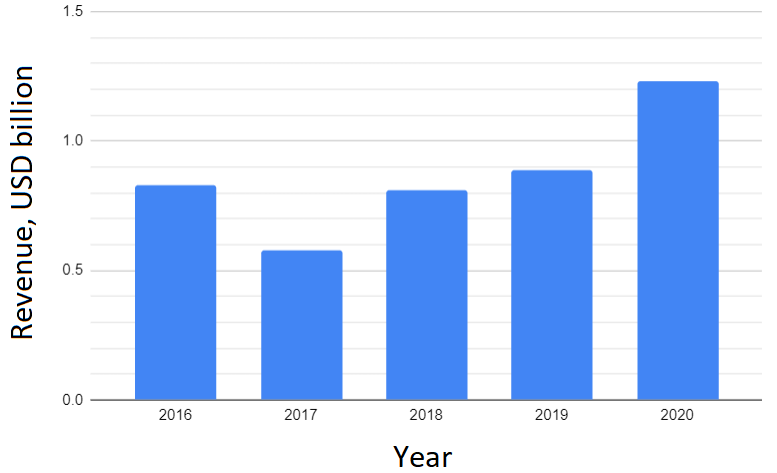
Revenue of Pokémon Go between 2016 and 2020

Pokémon Go rapidly rose to the American iOS App Store's "Top Grossing" and "Free" charts. It has become the fastest game to top the App Store and Google Play, beating Clash Royale, and it became the most downloaded app on the App Store of any application in the first week. Within two days of release, it was installed on more than 5 percent of Android devices in the United States, according to SimilarWeb. According to Sensor Tower, the game was downloaded more than 10 million times within the first week of being released, becoming the fastest app to ever do so, and reached 15 million global downloads by July 13. According to SurveyMonkey, the game became the most active mobile game in the United States of all time with 21 million active users on July 12, eclipsing Candy Crush Saga's peak of 20 million. By July 15, approximately 1.3 million people were playing the game in the Netherlands, despite the app not being officially released in the country at the time. On the day of release in Japan, more than 10 million people downloaded the game, including 1.3 million in the first three hours. By July 31, the game exceeded 100 million downloads worldwide, according to App Annie and Sensor Tower. On August 8, Pokémon Go reached the milestone of over 100 million downloads on Google Play alone after barely 33 days on the market.

Through in-game purchases, the game accumulated more than $160 million USD by the end of July 2016, with App Annie reporting that Pokémon Go had generated around $10 million in revenue every day that entire month. The same month, Sensor Tower reported that the game had exceeded $200 million in worldwide revenue, beating every existing record set by Clash of Clans and Candy Crush by a wide margin. On August 12, 2016, the Financial Times reported Pokémon Go reached $268 million in revenue after five weeks, counting only the U.S., British, and German markets. The average daily usage of the app on Android devices in July 2016 exceeded that of Snapchat, Tinder, Twitter, Instagram, and Facebook. Due to the game's massive popularity, several app developers became focused on developing similar AR apps using available software development kits (SDK). By September 2, 2016, Pokémon Go had generated more than 440 million dollars in global revenue, according to Sensor Tower. By September 30, it had received 500 million downloads and grossed $470 million in 80 days, according to market research firm Newzoo. Pokémon Go reached the milestone of 600 million dollars in revenue after only 90 days on the market, becoming the fastest mobile game ever to do so.

Besides in-game purchases, partnerships with retail chains like Starbucks, McDonald's, and Sprint pay Niantic Labs for "Foot Traffic" on demand at the retail shops.

The game was awarded five Guinness World Records in August 2016: most revenue grossed by a mobile game in its first month ($206.5 million USD); most downloaded mobile game in its first month (130 million downloads); most international charts topped simultaneously for a mobile game in its first month (top game in 70 different countries); most international charts topped simultaneously for a mobile game in its first month (top grossing in 55 countries simultaneously); and fastest time to gross 100 million dollars by a mobile game (reached in 20 days on July 26). By September 2016, Pokémon Go had been downloaded over 500 million times worldwide and became the fastest game to generate 500 million dollars in revenue. Pokémon Go was awarded the App Store's breakout hit of 2016. Pokémon Go was reported to be the most searched game on Google in 2016.

Usage of the game in the United States peaked on July 15, 2016; by mid-September, it had lost 79 percent of its players in the country. Forbes said, "the vaguely curious stopped playing, and the more committed players ran up against a fairly unsatisfying endgame". In October 2016, Niantic released a Halloween-themed event, which saw a surge in revenue up to 133 percent, as reported by Sensor Tower, placing the game back at the top of the leaderboard of highest-grossing apps. It was reported that the game earned approximately 23.3 million USD between October 25 and 29, up from approximately 10 million USD between October 18 and 22. According to App Annie, Pokémon Go grossed an estimated $950 million USD total in 2016.

==== 2017–2021 ====
In February 2017, Pokémon Go was named the best app at the Crunchies awards. By February 2017, the game had been downloaded more than 650 million times globally, with a reported $1 billion in revenue made, becoming the fastest mobile game ever to do so. By June 2017, the game had been downloaded more than 750 million times, with an estimated revenue of $1.2 billion, according to Apptopia. According to mobile app research firm Apptopia, approximately 60 million users were still playing the game a year after its launch. In May 2018, the Pokémon Company announced that the game reached over 800 million downloads worldwide. Forbes estimated that the game possibly came close to 900 million downloads by September 2018. The top five countries where it has received the most downloads are the United States (21.0 percent), Brazil (9.3 percent), India (8.6 percent), Mexico (5.5 percent), and Indonesia (5.0 percent). As of February 2019, the game exceeded 1 billion downloads worldwide.

A report from SuperData Research ranked Pokémon Go as the 9th highest grossing mobile game of 2017, with an annual revenue of $890 million. Bloomberg estimated Pokémon Go generated up to $2 billion in total revenue by late 2017. Two years from its initial launch, analyst firm Sensor Tower estimated the game had grossed over $1.8 billion from in-app purchases, reporting that players around the world continue to spend $2 million each day. SuperData Research reported that, in May 2018, Pokémon Go grossed $104 million in monthly revenue and had 147 million monthly active players, its highest since summer 2016. In July 2018, Pokémon Go was the top-grossing mobile app of the month. Since the introduction of trading and friends features, Sensor Tower has reported that players spend an average of $2.5 million per day. Apptopia reported that, by September 2018, the game had grossed over $2 billion from in-app purchases; the top five countries where it has received the most revenue are Japan ($670 million), the United States ($550 million), Germany ($88 million), the United Kingdom ($86 million), and Australia ($52 million). It was the fourth highest-grossing game of 2018, with $1.3 billion, and in 2019 alone, Pokémon Go earned $1.4 billion, according to Superdata Research, a division of Nielsen Media Research. Pokémon Go live events earned $249 million in tourism revenue during 2019. According to Sensor Tower in November 2020, Pokémon Go had accumulated nearly 600 million unique installs and generated almost $4.2 billion in revenue from in-game purchases via the iOS App Store and Google Play. Its largest market in terms of both installs and revenue is the United States, followed by Japan and Germany for revenue, and by Brazil and Mexico for installs.

During 2020, with the COVID-19 pandemic restricting players' ability to play Go outside their homes, Niantic implemented new features that allowed them to play the game from home. This was credited with increasing its player base throughout the year despite the restrictions. Despite a brief drop early in the pandemic, the number of monthly active users of the game rose by 45 percent between January and August 2020, and the game's revenue in 2020 was the highest in its history, exceeding even its 2016 revenue. The game generated more than $1 billion of revenue in the first 10 months of 2020, according to Sensor Tower, and it was the top-grossing mobile game of December 2020. Pokémon Go was one of the top five highest-grossing games of 2020, with an annual revenue of $1.92 billion, according to SuperData Research, bringing the game's cumulative revenue to $6.46 billion by 2020. The game generated a further $641.6 million in the first half of 2021.

=== Community and cultural impact ===
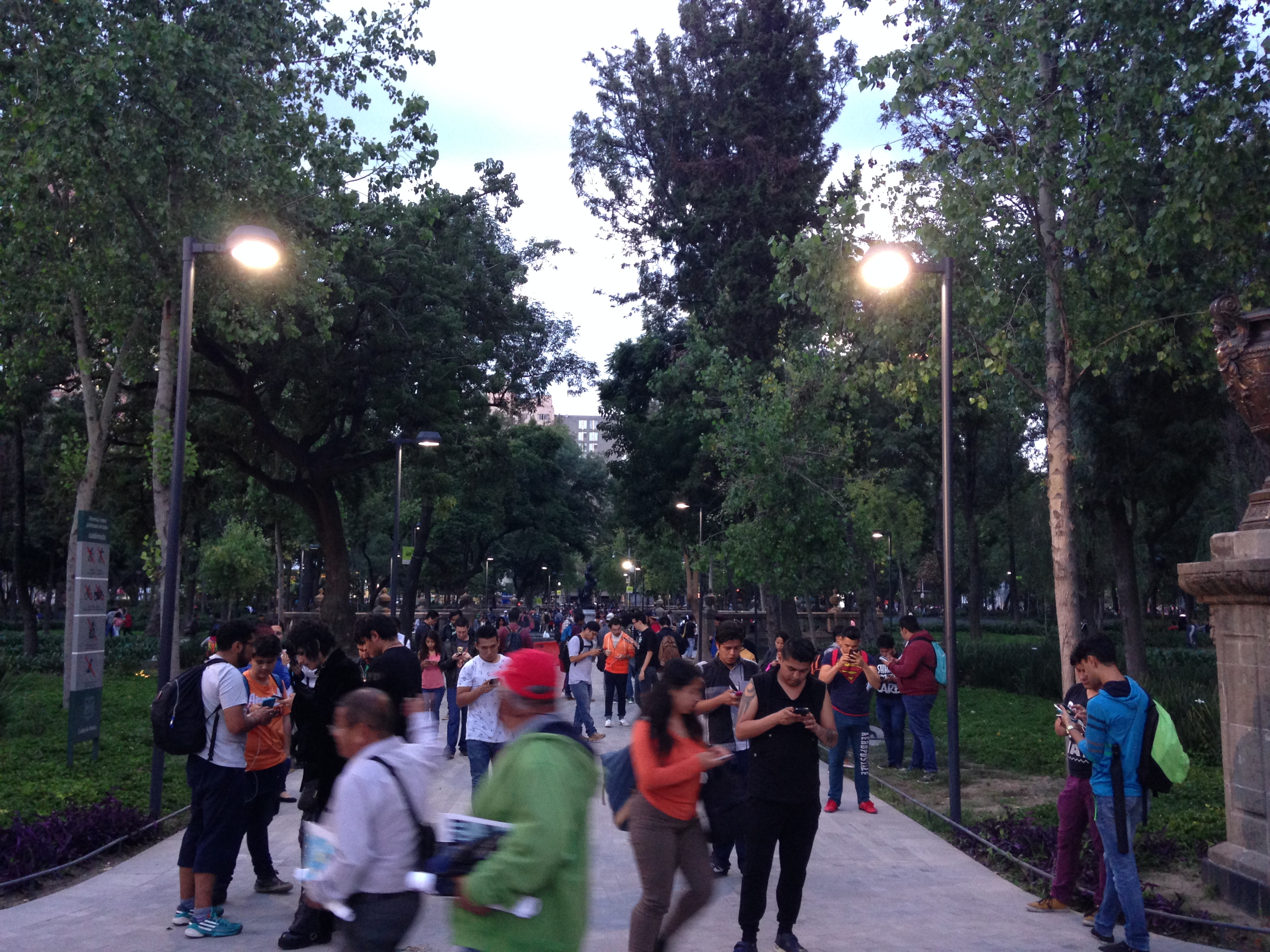
PokéStop in Alameda Central, Mexico City.

The game was referred to as a "social media phenomenon" that has brought people together from all walks of life. 231 million people engaged in 1.1 billion interactions that mentioned Pokémon Go on Facebook and Instagram in July. Many media outlets referred to the surge in popularity as "Pokémon Go Mania", or simply "Pokémania". The massive popularity of the game resulted in several unusual positive effects. For example, the game placed players where they can help capture criminals and report crimes in progress, although it has also placed some in dangerous situations and has even aided law enforcement's community relations, albeit with caveats. Businesses also benefited from the nearby presence of PokéStops (or from their business being a PokéStop) with the concomitant influx of people, and the intense exploration of communities has brought local history to the forefront. The game was also viewed as bringing its players to places of worship, as many Gyms are in these areas. Despite some criticism by religious leaders, this was received positively by religious groups, who saw it as reminding adherents to come and pray. Some establishments even considered purchasing lures in the game to attract additional players to PokéStops on their property. Within a week of its release, a secondary market emerged for the game, both for reselling high-level accounts on Craigslist and PlayerUp and for the sale of expert advice on Thumbtack. Wireless provider T-Mobile US started an offer for free data for a year for Pokémon Go sessions, and Yelp added a filter that only shows businesses that have a PokéStop nearby. National parks across the United States saw an influx of visitors due to the game, with "hundreds or thousands" of people visiting the National Mall and Memorial Parks in Washington, D.C., on the weekend following Pokémon Go's release in the country. Small museums with PokéStops placed at exhibits also reported increased attendance, such as the McNay Art Museum in San Antonio, Texas, and the Morikami Museum and Japanese Gardens in Boca Raton, Florida. Charity organizations also sought engagement from players, with animal shelters offering dog walks to people who want to hatch eggs in-game.

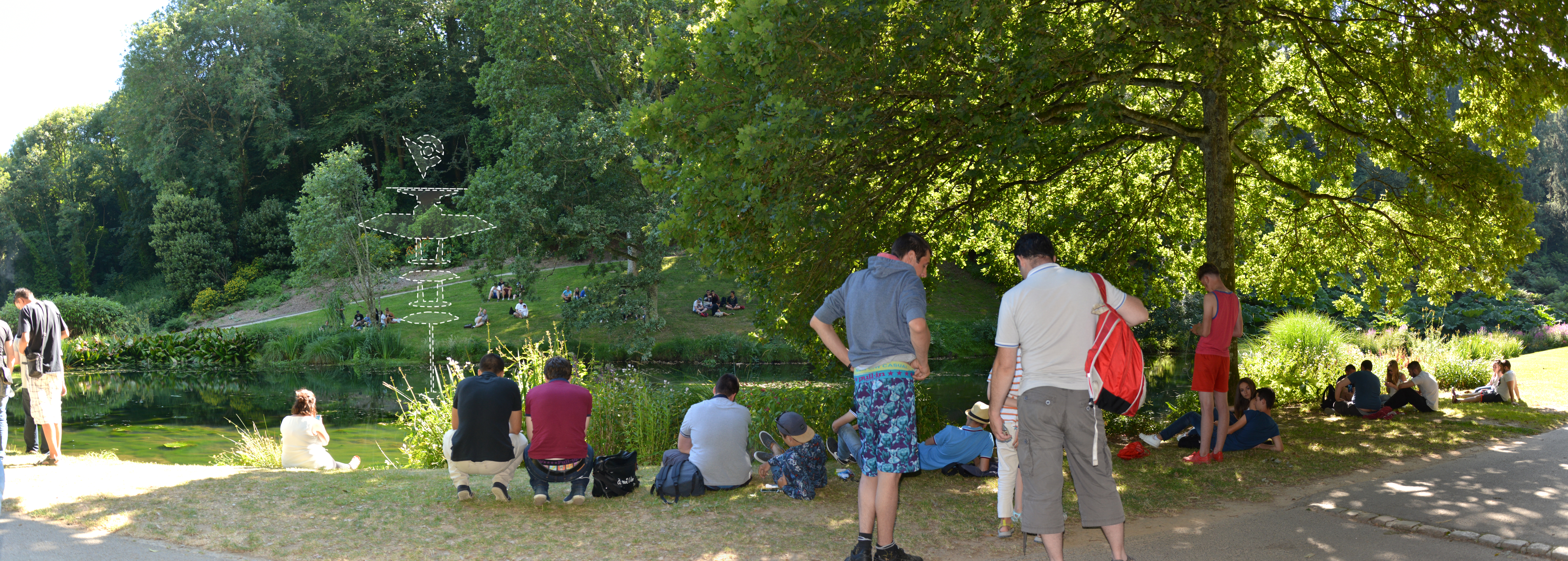
Players gathering around a "Gym" in a park in Brest, France.

Eduardo Paes, then-mayor of Rio de Janeiro, stated that he hoped the app would be released in Brazil before the start of the 2016 Summer Olympics in the city (ultimately it was, on August 3). United States presidential candidates Donald Trump and Hillary Clinton mentioned the app during their 2016 election campaigns. In late July 2016, during a public address, the President of Italy, Sergio Mattarella, compared a political issue about the date of an incoming referendum to the preposterous hunt for the Pokémon. Shortly after the game's release, Bellator mixed martial artist Michael Page celebrated a knockout of his match opponent, Evangelista Santos, by putting on a red Ash Ketchum-like hat and rolling a prop Poké Ball in Santos's direction. On July 25, Dwayne Johnson released a promo video featuring MatPat and Ali-A with himself as a tough, rare Pokémon.

The game was credited for popularizing AR and was praised by gender-fluid groups for letting the players choose a "style" instead of "gender". The game also had a positive impact on individuals with autism. The "Pokémon Theme" from the animated series saw a 630% increase in listeners on music streaming platform Spotify during the month of the game's release. Meanwhile, streaming services such as Hulu experienced an increased viewership of the Pokémon series and films. Nintendo reported that sales of the 3DS Pokémon games increased because of the game's popularity. A Twitch channel, Twitch Plays Pokémon Go, was created that mimics the crowd-played Twitch Plays Pokémon channel, allowing viewers to direct a virtual avatar in the game using an iPhone programmed to spoof its GPS location. Niantic later issued permanent bans to those who cheated the game by means such as GPS spoofing and bots. Pokémon-themed pornography increased in popularity after the release of the game. xHamster, an adult video streaming website, reported that within five days of the game's release, Pokémon-related terms were the most searched-for videos. Another adult video streaming website, Pornhub, reported that Pokémon-related searches spiked 136 percent. Pokémon Go was spoofed in the Maroon 5 music video, "Don't Wanna Know". In the 2016 Doctor Who Christmas special, "The Return of Doctor Mysterio", the Doctor creates a distraction by "flooding the downstairs with Pokémon", causing the people to run off with their cellphones. In the episode "Looking for Mr. Goodbart" from the 28th season of The Simpsons, the people of Springfield become addicted to Peekimon Get, a parody of Pokémon Go.

Go's release resulted in a resurgence in popularity for the Pokémon franchise. The Pokémon Sun and Moon games for the Nintendo 3DS, released later in 2016, were the best-selling video games for the 3DS, with over 16 million copies sold, and this was partly attributed to the new fans of the series brought in by Go. In an interview, director of Sun and Moon Shigeru Ohmori remarked that the Ultra Sun and Ultra Moon sequels were designed partly to facilitate entry for newcomers to the franchise brought in by Go. The first Pokémon games for the Nintendo Switch, Pokémon: Let's Go, Pikachu! and Let's Go, Eevee! took significant inspiration from Go. A line of official Go merchandise was released in November 2019.

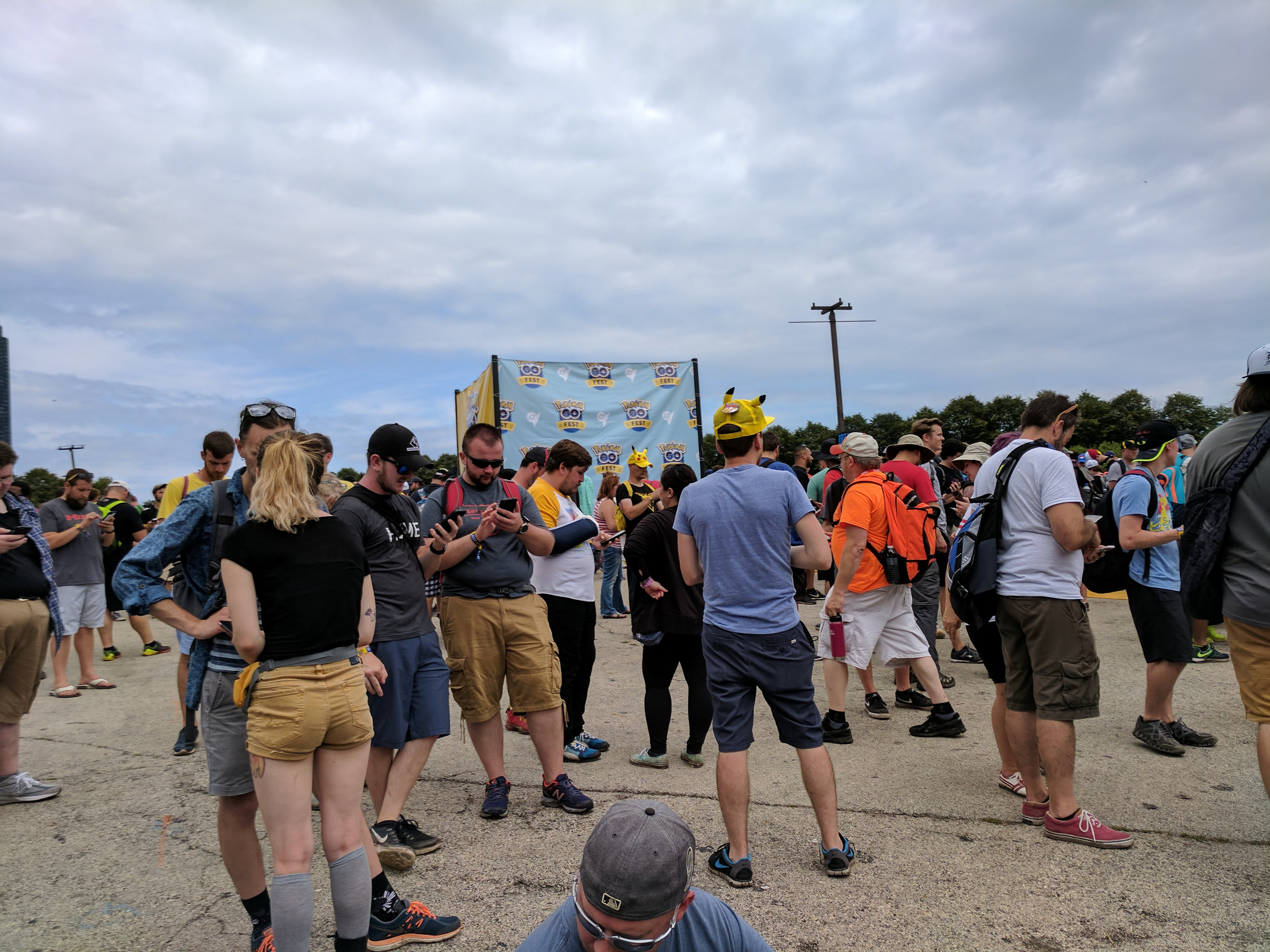
Players during the Pokémon Go Fest in Chicago, 2017

In addition to standard gameplay, the game has hosted several in-game and live events. The first live event officially held by Niantic was held in Charlotte, North Carolina, in May 2017. In July 2017, a community event was held in Grant Park, Chicago, in honor of the first anniversary of the game's release. Although almost no information about the event, including ticket prices and attractions, was released by Niantic ahead of the ticket sale, over 20,000 tickets sold out within half an hour. During the event itself, attendees suffered connectivity issues and crashes due to the heavy amount of localized cellular activity. Afterward, Niantic announced they would refund everybody who bought a ticket, as well as supply them with 100 dollars of in-game currency. Following the event, around two dozen attendees sued Niantic, seeking travel reimbursement.

Following the event in Chicago, other events have been hosted in Chester, Yokohama, and San Jose. In September 2017, a series of events named "Safari Zone" were held in Unibail-Rodamco shopping centers in Oberhausen, Paris, and Barcelona, with events for the following month in Copenhagen, Prague, Stockholm, and Amstelveen.

In January 2018, Niantic announced a monthly community event called Community Day, which aims to get players to meet up in their local areas. During a multi-hour period, players can encounter more frequent wild spawns of a particular Pokémon, an exclusive move for that Pokémon (or its evolution), an increased probability to obtain the shiny form of that Pokémon, and bonuses such as extra Stardust or XP. The Community Days in 2018 featured Pikachu (January 20), Dratini (February 24), Bulbasaur (March 25), Mareep (April 15), Charmander (May 19), Larvitar (June 16), Squirtle (July 8), Eevee (August 11–12), Chikorita (September 22), Beldum (October 21), and Cyndaquil (November 10).

Pokémon Go in Syria is a photography series published in 2016 by Syrian artist Khaled Akil. Akil places Pokémon characters in destroyed Syrian streets as a reminder of a world lost behind the screen. While Pokémon Go was trending worldwide, Akil couldn't help but notice how the media forgot about the war in Syria and visualized his idea as digital collages. Khaled's Pokémon series quickly went viral across the globe after he posted it online. This photography series was exhibited in various locations, including the American University Museum.

=== Criticism and incidents ===
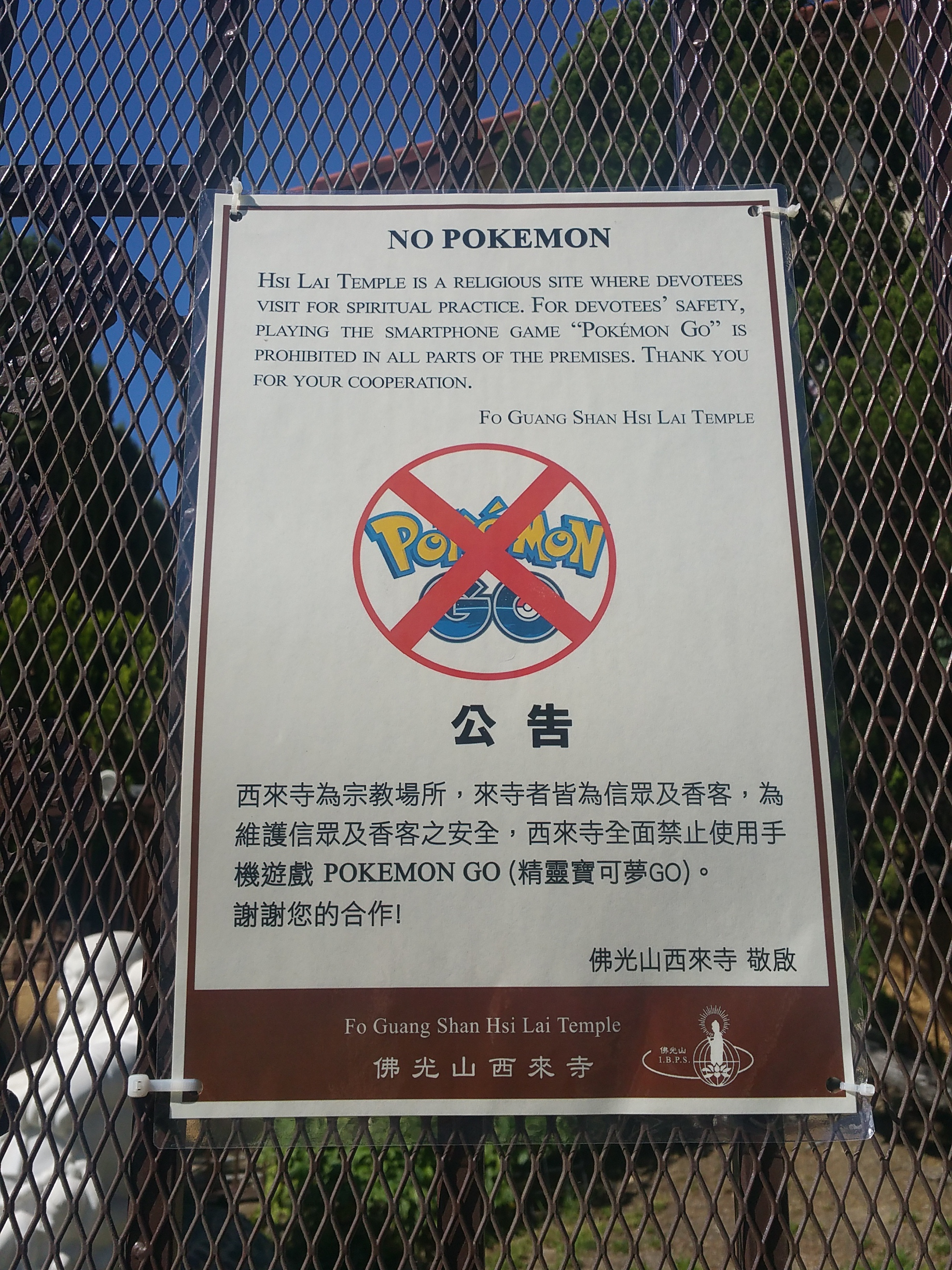
A sign outside Fo Guang Shan Hsi Lai Temple in Hacienda Heights, California, admonishing visitors to not play Pokémon Go inside the temple grounds.

The app faced criticism for designating inappropriate locations like cemeteries and memorials as Pokémon capture sites, including the Auschwitz-Birkenau State Museum, the United States Holocaust Memorial Museum, the National September 11 Memorial & Museum, Arlington National Cemetery, the ANZAC War Memorial, and Hiroshima Peace Memorial Park. Niantic responded by removing content from sensitive areas like the Hiroshima Memorial and Holocaust Museum. Dutch company ProRail raised concerns about players trespassing on railway tracks, and fire stations urged players not to obstruct their operations by gathering outside.

The game's distribution of PokéStops and Gyms (derived from the portals in Ingress, Niantic's science fiction-themed AR game) was noted to be sparser in many minority neighborhoods in a reflection of American demographics. Players in rural areas also complained about the lack of Pokémon spawns, PokéStops, and Gyms in their area. Pokémon Go was criticized for game accessibility issues by players with physical disabilities. The AbleGamers Foundation COO, Steve Spohn, said that when Pokémon Go was compared to other mobile games, it "excludes disabled players to a significant degree".

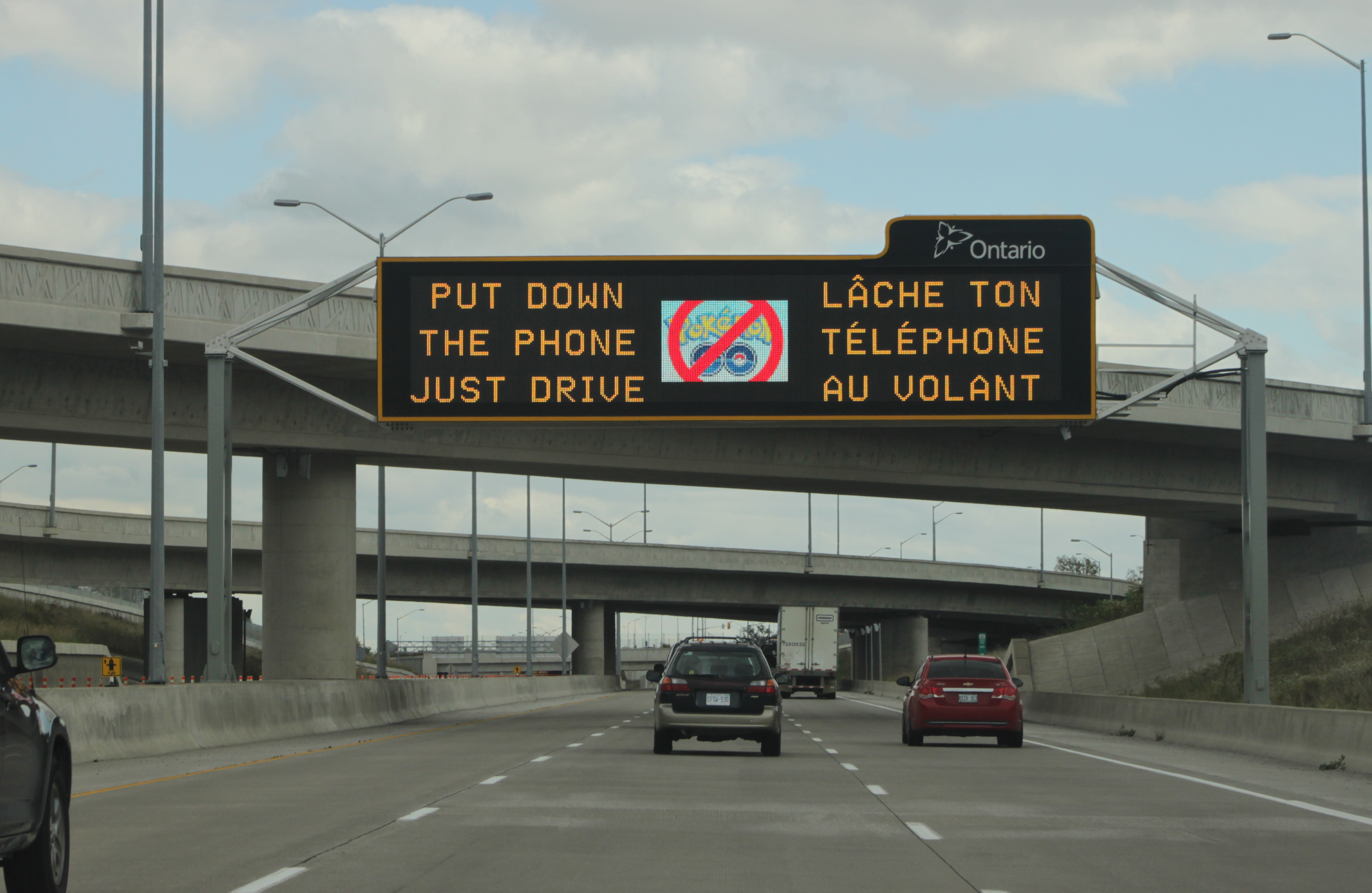
A variable-message sign in Windsor, Ontario, Canada, warning drivers to avoid playing Pokémon Go while driving.

Police departments in various countries issued warnings, some tongue-in-cheek, regarding inattentive driving, trespassing, and being targeted by criminals due to being unaware of one's surroundings. In the state of New York, sex offenders are banned from using the application while on parole, due to concerns stemming from a large percentage of the player base being minors. Bosnian players were cautioned to avoid entering minefields from the Bosnian War. In Russia, a 21-year-old video blogger, Ruslan Sokolovsky, was arrested in September 2016 for two months after playing Pokémon Go at the Church of All Saints in Yekaterinburg. He eventually received a suspended sentence of three and a half years in prison for charges of blasphemy.

People have suffered various injuries from accidents related to the game. In Japan, the first accident occurred within hours of the game's release. The first death in Japan attributed to Pokémon Go occurred in late August 2016. A distracted driver playing the game killed one woman and badly injured another. The 39-year-old farmer did not notice the women crossing the street and hit them with his truck. The woman died due to a broken neck. Japan's National Police Agency said it was the 79th Pokémon Go-related accident in the country. On August 11, 2016, a young girl in Cambodia was reportedly killed after being hit by a car while trying to capture a Pokémon on a road. The case was the first death related to Pokémon Go among Southeast Asian countries. In January 2017, a Chinese-American civilian, Jiansheng Chen, was shot dead while playing Pokémon Go.

Al-Azhar University in Cairo described the game as "harmful mania." A Cossack leader declared that it "smacks of Satanism", Kuwait banned the game from government sites, Indonesian officials deemed it a national security threat, and in Israel the IDF banned the game from army bases out of security considerations. In Saudi Arabia, the General Secretariat of the Council of Senior Scholars declared, considering a 2001 fatwa banning the Pokémon card game as a form of gambling, that the electronic app required a new ruling. This was also followed by both Indian and Malaysian Islamic leaders telling Indian and Malaysian Muslims to avoid the game.

During Thailand's 2016 constitutional referendum polling, Pokémon Go players were told not to enter polling stations. Thus, the Thai National Broadcasting and Communications Commission intends to ask Niantic to remove Pokémon characters and PokéStops from locations such as government facilities, historic and religious sites, private property, and dangerous spots such as narrow footpaths and rivers. Cambodia has banned the game in a former genocide site after Pokémon players showed up there. Vietnam has banned players from entering the government and defense offices. The Vietnamese Ministry of Information and Communications is also considering the game's negative impact on Vietnamese society, where many people left home at night, crossed the road, or drove on the street with their eyes kept focused on phones. This brought the need to ban the game in the country. Following the move by other Southeast Asian neighbors, the Philippines also banned the game in all administration offices. According to a survey by the Malaysian Employers Federation (MEF), around 4 percent of employers in Malaysia fired their staff for playing the game during working hours.

Russia also voiced concerns about the application, with Nikolay Nikiforov, the country's Minister of Communications and Mass Media, suspecting foreign intelligence agencies of using it to collect information. Some fundamentalist religious groups in the region declare it to be demonic. The Supreme Council of Virtual Space in Iran officially banned the game in August 2016 over security concerns. The same month, The Pentagon facility in the U.S. restricted the use of the game on their property, citing security risks by collecting private information. In the United Kingdom, 290 police incidents were reported to have occurred in July 2016 in the country due to the game. Due to incidents involving players using cheats on rooted Android phones in September 2016, Niantic stopped supporting the CyanogenMod mobile operating system. This prevented users playing on CyanogenMod from playing the game from that point forward.

In India, the Gujarat High Court issued a notice to Niantic on the grounds of "posing danger to public safety". The notice was issued in response to a PIL (Public Interest Litigation) seeking a ban on the game in India. In addition, a second PIL was filed against the developers of Pokémon Go for hurting religious sentiments by showing images of eggs in places of worship of different religious groups, but the game was not banned.

Pokémon Go's targeted local advertising has been described by Shoshana Zuboff in The Age of Surveillance Capitalism as an experiment that originated from Google to move targeted advertising from the digital domain (cost per click) into the physical domain (cost per visit). This is done using sponsored locations. "In the end we recognize that the probe was designed to explore the next frontier: the means of behavioral modification. The game about the game is, in fact, an experimental facsimile of surveillance capitalism's design for our future."

Some players of Pokémon Go have vandalized OpenStreetMap, one of the game's map data sources, to manipulate gameplay.

Niantic Spatial spun off from Niantic in May 2025 and used 30 billion image scans made by Pokémon Go players to develop a geospatial artificial intelligence model. The company used the data in collaboration with Vantor to develop a positioning system for military drones.

=== Third-party tools ===
Multiple unofficial, third-party applications corresponded with Pokémon Go. Notable apps include "Poké Radar" and "Helper for Pokémon Go", where players can crowdsource much of the Pokémon that can be found in the game at a particular time. At its peak of popularity, "Poké Radar" hit #2 on the Apple App Store, behind Pokémon Go itself.

Another app, GoChat, which allows players to leave messages for other players at specific locations, accrued more than 1 million downloads in five days and reached the top 10 in the Apple App Store and Google Play Store. However, the app's developer, Jonathan Zarra, left the app non-monetized and had financial trouble keeping the application's servers online until bringing on angel investor and board member Michael Robertson. After acquiring significant funding, the app reached over 2 million active users. According to RiskIQ, at least 215 fake versions of the game were available by July 17, 2016. Several of these fake apps contained malicious programming and viruses.

Launched on July 22, 2016, "Pokévision" enabled players to find exactly where Pokémon spawned and how much time remained before they despawned; the site used data hacked directly from the game. In the five days following the website's launch, 27 million unique visitors used the site. On July 31, multiple search apps and sites, including Pokévision, were disabled as they violated Niantic's terms of service.

=== Sale to Scopely ===
In March 2025, Niantic announced it would sell its video game division, including Pokémon Go, to mobile publisher Scopely for 3.5 billion dollars. The deal, confirmed on March 12, 2025, encompassed Niantic's flagship titles (Pokémon Go, Pikmin Bloom, and Monster Hunter Now) and companion apps Campfire and Wayfarer, while augmented reality games Ingress and Peridot were retained by the spun-off entity Niantic Spatial. As part of the transaction, Niantic distributed 350 million dollars to its equity holders and funded Niantic Spatial with 250 million—200 million dollars from its balance sheet and 50 million dollars from Scopely—under the continued leadership of CEO John Hanke. The acquisition was finished on May 29, 2025, following regulatory approval, and led to the layoff of 68 employees at Niantic's Ferry Building headquarters in San Francisco.

=== COVID-19 pandemic ===
During the COVID-19 pandemic, Niantic responded by implementing changes and new features in the game, allowing players to play remotely more easily. However, starting on August 1, 2021, Niantic began rolling back these changes as part of its Exploration Bonus Updates. Players in New Zealand and the United States were the first to receive the post-lockdown changes, and gradually, they were rolled out to the rest of the world. The company has since received heavy criticism from the player base for concerns around health and personal safety regulations as well as negatively impacting players with disabilities. A main complaint was that Niantic reverted safety measures implemented during the lockdown, in which the interaction distances for Gyms and PokéStops were increased from 40 to 80 meters. Despite increasing rates of the SARS-CoV-2 Delta variant in various U.S. states, Niantic is firm on not keeping the pandemic bonuses. Players began boycotting Pokémon Go since the first week of August 2021.

On Twitter, the #HearUsNiantic started trending worldwide as fans and players voiced their censure towards Niantic's decision to remove the pandemic bonuses. Niantic responded on August 5, 2021 in a blog post where they stood with their decisions to rollback "bonuses" from the previous year. It stated that its "mission" is to "encourage outdoor exploration" and "to connect people to real places in the real world and to visit places that are worth exploration". This post also announces the creation of "an internal cross-functional team" to address community concerns regarding interaction distance. The following month, on September 1, 2021, Niantic posts a news update for Pokémon Go users stating that the 80 meter interaction radius will be returned, and increased communication will be opened with the community with the start of monthly "Developer Diary" announcements.

In 2025, several gameplay adjustments introduced in early 2020 remain permanent changes. The doubled interaction distance for PokéStops and Gyms was reinstated as the baseline radius on August 26, 2021. Remote Raid Battles have since been fully integrated: as of May 13, 2025, trainers may use up to 10 Remote Raid Passes per day to join Shadow Raids and Max Battles from anywhere, and bundles of passes are now available in the Pokémon Go Web Store. Incense retains its pandemic-era duration and spawn rates—lasting 60 minutes and generating one Pokémon per minute while moving (or one every five minutes when stationary)—and Adventure Sync continues to record walking distance in the background to hatch Eggs and earn Buddy Candy even when the app is closed. Gift interactions also remain flexible, with a daily cap of 30 opened gifts instituted in March 2020 still in effect.

== Awards ==
Award	Category	Result	Ref
BBC Radio 1's Teen Awards 2016	Best Game	Won	
The Game Awards 2016	Best Mobile/Handheld Game	Won	
The Game Awards 2016	Best Family Game	Won	
Golden Joystick Awards 2016	Innovation of the Year	Won	
Golden Joystick Awards 2016	Handheld/Mobile Game of the Year	Won	
2016 TechRaptor Awards	Best Mobile/Handheld Game	Won	
20th Annual D.I.C.E. Awards	Game of the Year	Nominated	
20th Annual D.I.C.E. Awards	Mobile Game of the Year	Won	
New York Game Critic Awards	A-Train Award for Best Mobile Game	Won	
New York Game Critic Awards	Central Park Zoo Award for Best Kids Game	Won	
17th Game Developers Choice Awards	Best Mobile/Handheld Game	Won	
17th Game Developers Choice Awards	Innovation Award	Nominated	
17th Game Developers Choice Awards	Best VR/AR Game	Nominated	
British Academy Children's Awards 2017	Game	Won	
International Mobile Gaming Awards 2017	Grand Prix	Won	
2017 SXSW Gaming Awards	Mobile Game of the Year	Won	
2017 SXSW Gaming Awards	Excellence in Technical Achievements	Nominated	
13th British Academy Games Awards	Family	Nominated	
13th British Academy Games Awards	Game Innovation	Nominated	
13th British Academy Games Awards	Mobile	Won	
Golden Joystick Awards 2018	Still Playing Award	Nominated	
Gamers' Choice Awards 2018	Fan Favorite Mobile Game	Won	
2019 SXSW Gaming Awards	Most Evolved Game	Nominated	
15th British Academy Games Awards	EE Mobile Game of the Year	Nominated	
Pocket Gamer Mobile Games Awards	Best Live Ops	Nominated	
16th British Academy Games Awards	EE Mobile Game of the Year	Nominated	
2021 Kids' Choice Awards	Favorite Video Game	Nominated	
Golden Joystick Awards	Still Playing Award - Mobile	Won	

== See also ==
- List of Pokémon, the list of all of the original Pokémon by order
- Pikmin Bloom, a similar game also developed by Niantic and Nintendo
