= Star Trek Fleet Command =

2018 video game

- Developer: Digit Game Studios
- Publishers: Scopely, CBS Interactive
- Composer: Erik Desiderio
- Engine: Unity 2018.4.2f1
- Platforms: Android, iOS, iPadOS, macOS, Microsoft Windows
- Release: November 29, 2018
- Genres: 4X, RPG, MMO

Star Trek Fleet Command is a mobile strategy game created by Irish developer Digit Game Studios and published by Scopely and CBS Interactive. Players can explore star systems, build ships, mine resources, level up, complete missions, join alliances and battle other gamers.

The game originally was based on the Kelvin timeline from the Star Trek franchise, and includes iconic characters from the series: Kirk, Spock, McCoy, Scotty, Sulu, Uhura, Nero, and more. In the likeness of 2016's Star Trek Beyond, players can collect and upgrade characters and deploy on ships for a RPG role-playing game-style element.

In August 2020, the game announced it would begin adding ships, characters, and plotlines from other installments of the franchise, beginning with Star Trek: Discovery. Subsequent updates incorporated elements from Star Trek: The Original Series, Star Trek: The Next Generation, Star Trek: Lower Decks, Star Trek: Strange New Worlds, Star Trek: Deep Space Nine, and Star Trek: Enterprise.

== Gameplay ==
In Star Trek Fleet Command, players start out with a space station and one ship. They can explore galactic systems, interact with NPCs and other players as well as complete missions. Missions, mining and combat rewards give the player resources used to upgrade their space station and invest in new ships.

The combat system is calculated based on turns but occurs in real-time gameplay. It is possible to attack or be attacked by NPC or other players' ships. The game features an alliance system as well as a galaxy, alliance and private chats.

There are also events that can reward players with various in-game rewards. The game also includes a variety of in-game purchases ranging from $4.99 to $99.99.

== Reception ==
Joe Jordan of Pocket Gamer reviewed the game in 2018 and found "a deep mobile MMOG that combines its licence, metagame and gameplay in a thoroughly enjoyable and engaging manner," giving a final score of 4.5 out of 5. Glenn Wilson of GameZebo gave a score of 4 out of 5. Doug Mercer of COG Connect reviewed the game giving a score of 80% out of 100%. Italian website multiplayer.it gave the game a score of 8.2 out of 10.

The game was nominated for "Excellence in Convergence" at the SXSW Gaming Awards, and for "Best Music in a Casual/Social Game" at the 2019 G.A.N.G. Awards, and won the People's Voice Award each for "Strategy/Simulation Game" and "Technical Achievement" at the 2019 Webby Awards. It was also nominated for "Song/Score - Mobile Video Game" at the Hollywood Music in Media Awards, and for "Game of the Year" at the Pocket Gamer Mobile Games Awards.
