= The Walking Dead: Road to Survival =

2015 video game

- Developer: IUGO Mobile Entertainment
- Publisher: Scopely
- Platforms: Android, iOS
- Release: August 27, 2015; Closed November 28, 2024
- Genre: Role-playing
- Modes: Single-player, multiplayer

The Walking Dead: Road to Survival was a role-playing video game for Android and iOS, based on the comic book series The Walking Dead by Robert Kirkman, as well as the story of The Walking Dead TV series writer Jay Bonansinga. Road to Survival was developed by Scopely and co-created with IUGO Mobile Entertainment.

Initially released in Australia on the Android platform, the game was officially launched in the U.S. on 27 August 2015 on Android and iOS.

On December 10, 2015, Scopely combined with Telltale Games to use some of their characters from The Walking Dead and made adaptations of scenes from episodes in the game as well as additional tie-ins featuring the same characters, in the Scopely release.

After nine years of operation, Scopely announced on October 14, 2024 that the game, which requires an internet connection to play, will be permanently shutting down on November 28, with in-app purchases being disabled on October 29.

== Plot ==
The app contains a story mode, which follows the journey of an unnamed protagonist (controlled by the player) and handful of other survivors in a zombie apocalypse. Player's actions will have an effect on the story, and they are given multiple choices throughout the game.

The player character encounters characters from the comic series, Telltale's video game series and the novel series, as well as completely new original characters unique to the app.

== Reception ==
Gamezebo described the game as a "mature role-playing video game"', in their First Impression Review, comparing the gameplay to Clash of Clans. Modojo stated that it was a 'clone of other resource management sims' that are already available on the mobile platform, describing it also as a "mature [role-playing game]", more so than an "action game".

The game went to number 1 on the iOS App Store upon release.
