= Monopoly Go! =

2023 video game

- App icon with Mr. Monopoly
- Developer: Scopely
- Publisher: Scopely
- Director: Massimo Maietti
- Series: Monopoly
- Engine: Unity
- Platforms: Android; iOS
- Release: April 11, 2023
- Genre: Board game
- Mode: Single-player

Monopoly Go! is a 2023 mobile board game developed and published by Scopely. It was released for Android and iOS devices on April 11, 2023. It is based on the board game by Hasbro. With over 150 million downloads, the mobile game has generated $5 billion in revenue since its launch in April 2023.

== Gameplay ==
Monopoly Go! is a single-player mobile board game video game that mixes the aesthetics of classic Monopoly with a mobile gaming loop. Players start out with ownership of all properties and roll dice to make money which can be used to upgrade one of five landmarks, which are unique to each themed board (such as Tokyo Tower on the Tokyo board). Players also encounter events like bank heists or take-downs which let them win money from other players, which was marketed as a light social feature of the game. The number of dice rolls per day are limited, but their value can be optimized through gameplay, or additional rolls can be purchased.

A recurrent mini-game called Treasure Hunting is another aspect of Monopoly Go that allows the player to find hidden objects for rewards. Like other events, these mini-games are themed and only playable for a short period of time—usually a few days. All Treasure Hunts revolve around the basic gameplay of tapping squares on a grid to reveal objects. The player needs special tokens called "pickaxes" or "shovels" in order to uncover the squares.

== Reception ==
Reviewers criticized various aspects of Monopoly Go!. Rachel Mogan from Android Central praised the game's appealing visuals, smooth gameplay, and impressive sound. However, she stated that it is "abundantly clear that Monopoly GO! is one of the many mobile games designed for the sole purpose of making as much money as it possibly can". Writing for Destructoid, CJ Andriessen criticized the game for having intrusive in-game ads.

=== Sales ===
By November 2023, Monopoly Go generated more than $1 billion in revenue, becoming the biggest mobile game launch of 2023. Scopely also added that Monopoly Go is bringing in more than $200 million every month for the company. By March 2024, the game generated $2 billion in revenue just 10 months after launch and three months after hitting $1 billion. The game also had a marketing budget of nearly $500 million. The game generated $2.5 billion in consumer spending, making it the biggest mobile game with the highest consumer spending in 2024.

In 2025, the game surpassed $1 billion in marketing spending since its launch. The game generated $5 billion by April 2025.
