= Meltan =

Pokémon species

- Pokémon character
- Meltan artwork by Ken Sugimori
- First game: Pokémon Go (2018)
- Created by: Junichi Masuda (concept)
- Voiced by: EN: Samantha Cooper; JA: Kenta Miyake

In-universe information
- Species: Pokémon
- Type: Steel

Meltan (/ˈmɛltæn/; Japanese: メルタン, Hepburn: Merutan) is a Pokémon species in Nintendo and Game Freak's Pokémon media franchise. First introduced in Pokémon Go, it was conceived by series director Junichi Masuda as a way to "build a bridge" between players of mobile game Go and those of the mainline Pokémon titles. Since its debut it has since appeared in other titles such as the Nintendo Switch games Pokémon: Let's Go, Pikachu! and Let's Go, Eevee!, the Pokémon Trading Card Game, as well as various merchandise. In media related to the franchise, Meltan has been voiced by Samantha Cooper in English, and Kenta Miyake in Japanese.

Classified as a Steel-type Pokémon, Meltan appears as a small creature with a grey liquid metal body and short arms, a wire shaped tail, and a hardware nut for a head with a small black eye that floats in the center. It was initially revealed via a surprise promotion within Go in 2018, with the game's development team announcing details regarding the species days later. Meltan was designed to reflect the simpler designs of the series' first games in the series, Pokémon Red and Blue. Despite being classified as a Mythical Pokémon, which normally cannot evolve, it can evolve into Melmetal within Pokémon Go.

Meltan's surprise debut received widespread reaction, with fans trying to reason what exactly was occurring and whether or not it was an intentional aspect of the game or a bug. Many fans and some media outlets also offered their own theories regarding the character, as well as giving it fan names such as "Nutto" until the official name was revealed. It has since been cited as significantly helping Go's revenue growth for 2018, and one of the most important Pokémon in the franchise as a whole for how it ties Go to the main franchise games.

== Conception and development ==
Meltan is a species of fictional creatures called Pokémon created for the Pokémon media franchise. Developed by Game Freak and published by Nintendo, the Japanese franchise began in 1996 with the video games Pokémon Red and Green for the Game Boy, which were later released in North America as Pokémon Red and Blue in 1998. In these games and their sequels, the player assumes the role of a Trainer whose goal is to capture and use the creatures' special abilities to combat other Pokémon. Some Pokémon can transform into stronger species through a process called evolution via various means, such as exposure to specific items. Each Pokémon has one or two elemental types, which define its advantages and disadvantages when battling other Pokémon. A major goal in each game is to complete the Pokédex, a comprehensive Pokémon encyclopedia, by capturing, evolving, and trading with other Trainers to obtain individuals from all Pokémon species.

Meltan was created for Pokémon Go, an augmented reality game mobile phone component of the Pokémon franchise where players traverse the world around them and capture Pokémon at designated locations. During the game's planning, series director Junichi Masuda had wanted to debut a new species of Pokémon with the title, and worked with Go's developers Niantic to that end. The character was revealed in-game in September 2018, via an event that was originally intended to highlight the Pokémon Chikorita. Masuda had planned instead to introduce Meltan at this time, something kept secret from not only players, but people within the company itself. The decision on how to approach it was handed jointly between Masuda, The Pokémon Company's public relations team, and Niantic. Masuda in particular was cautious on how to approach its debut, as he wanted players to see "a cute Pokémon right from the start", and felt if handled wrong they may instead be repulsed by its sudden appearance. Calling Meltan the first Pokémon to be discovered by players of the game in the real world, he ultimately found the reaction had been "generally really positive" and appreciated how quickly fan art appeared online after its debut.

=== Design ===
Special attention was paid to how Meltan's eye and tail animates to convey its emotions, such as wagging its tail when happy or drooping when sad.

Standing 8 inches (20 cm) tall, Meltan has a grey liquid metal body made of gallium, with short arms, a tail in the shape of a red wire with two exposed copper points, a large head shaped like a golden hexagonal hardware nut, and a grey singular eye that hovers in the middle of its head. Its eye and takes on various shapes as its means to convey facial expressions along with the movement of its tail. Meltan's nut-shaped head can temporarily detach from its body. Its primary means of attack is an eye laser, using energy it collects with its body. Classified as a Steel-type Pokémon, it is also considered a Mythical Pokémon, a particularly special and rare type of Pokémon usually only given to players at special distribution events. Unlike other Mythical Pokémon, Meltan can evolve into the Pokémon Melmetal after being given 400 Meltan Candy, an item in Go. This aspect was the result of Game Freak wanting the character to be emblematic of Pokémon Go's capture mechanics, where players collect candy via repeatedly catching many of the same species of Pokémon.

Though Niantic oversaw Go's development, Meltan was created by the staff at Game Freak. In an interview, Masuda stated he gave specific setting directions revolving around a hardware nut to one of their designers, who according to him "was also a fan of the original games and played them as a kid, so he had a really good idea of what I was looking for". Masuda felt the species' finalized appearance reflected many elements of Pokémon created for Red and Blue, and that the designer tried to keep it as "simple as possible", reflecting a basic ideal contrasting with the series' more modern designs. Satisfied with the results, they presented it to Niantic's development team, who incorporated the character into the game. Masuda stated that Meltan was created out of a "desire to build a bridge between the players of the core Pokémon series and players of Pokémon Go", with the development team wanting to satisfy both groups.

== Appearances ==
Meltan first appeared in the spin-off augmented reality Pokémon game Pokémon Go. It was added to the game following an in-game event, and appeared in the wild with no explanation given for its appearance. Meltan appeared without a name, and once captured by players, would be revealed to be a Ditto that had shapeshifted into Meltan. It additionally appeared alongside the arrival of Kecleon, a Pokémon species which was at that point unobtainable in the game, with the Kecleon similarly transforming into Ditto upon being captured. Meltan's icons in the game's code were also labelled "Kecleon." Players speculated over whether Meltan was a placeholder or an actual Pokémon species. Meltan's name was unknown, leading to fan nicknames such as "Nutto" being used to describe it prior to its official reveal.

Meltan was officially revealed a few days later, with confirmation that Meltan could be transferred from Go to the Nintendo Switch games Pokémon: Let's Go, Pikachu! and Let's Go, Eevee!. Several trailers were released to promote Meltan's inclusion in the games. Meltan's ability to evolve was teased in October 2018, and its evolution, Melmetal, was revealed shortly after. Meltan can be obtained in Go by linking Let's Go and Go together, allowing players to obtain an item called the "Mystery Box." When used, the Mystery Box allows players to encounter Meltan in Go's overworld for an allotted period of time. Meltan can only evolve into Melmetal in Go; Melmetal is only obtainable in the Let's Go! games via being transferred from Go. An alternate coloration of Meltan, referred to as a "Shiny" form, is obtainable in special, limited time events in Go. Meltan later re-appeared in the 2019 games Pokémon Sword and Shield, where it is not obtainable in the games naturally, but can be transferred in through the storage app Pokémon Home. Both Meltan and Melmetal appear in the Mega Dimensions downloadable content in Pokémon Legends: Z-A and are obtainable in a sidequest.

Outside of video games, Meltan appeared in the Pokémon anime, where one was captured by protagonist Ash Ketchum, and later evolves into Melmetal. For these appearances, it was voiced by Samantha Cooper in English, and by Kenta Miyake in Japanese. Meltan also appears briefly in a cameo in the manga series One Piece following a collaboration between it and Go in 2019. In physical media and merchandise, Meltan has appeared in the Pokémon Trading Card Game, while in 2022 the Pokémon Online Shop released a life-sized Meltan plush.

== Critical reception ==
Meltan's sudden appearance in Pokémon Go was met with surprise from its player base, who quickly went to social media websites such as Twitter to express their confusion over what exactly they had encountered in-game. As the company behind it did not respond initially regarding its appearance and several other glitches occurred, some players assumed it was a bug in the game. Media outlets also commented on the subject. Scott Baird of TheGamer suggested it might have been a new evolution for Ditto, who had originally been intended to receive an evolution during Pokémon Gold and Silver's development. Bleeding Cool's Gavin Sheenan was critical of its appearance, stating "by all accounts, this looks like a creature that didn't get finished in the design phase" due to what he perceived as a mishmash of elements.

Though Niantic did clarify the matter three days after its initial appearance, Yuma Yamamoto of Gizmodo.jp found the whole event to be an exciting experience for the game, not only providing a sense of entertainment but also tension. Yamamoto compared it to the discovery of Mew, the series first Mythical Pokémon, and how players found it in the first games in the series by manipulating the games' code. He observed that Meltan's sudden appearance coupled with the real-world interactions of Pokémon Go as a game created a different atmosphere for the reveal, and coupled with the company's silence allowing the internet to come to their own conclusions not only made for a good gaming experience but a memorable one tied to the "cute" character. Israel Mallén of MeriStation meanwhile felt that it helped bring back some the sense of wonder players felt upon initially discovering Mew's existence, allowing one to "recover the innocence of yesteryear" and some of the mysticism that surrounded Mythical Pokémon in the franchise as a whole.

Emma Schaefer of EGMNOW made similar observations, finding that the air of mystery around the character helped it immensely. Though she noted early teaser reveals of Pokémon were not uncommon to the franchise, often showcased in anime or film media prior to their debut or in Japanese magazine previews, the community had come to expect them and would instead quickly dissect and document the information. As a result, she felt a lot of the major element of discovery that brought players to the franchise and was a significant part of its charm had been lost. She cited an example with the Pokémon Zeraora introduced after the release of Pokémon Sun and Moon, observing that while it had a strong design and was popular in fan communities, due to data mining it had been discovered in the games long before its debut, and by the time Nintendo did reveal it "nobody cared". Meltan's sudden reveal by comparison not only created confusion, but interest and attention for the game over the "weirdest-looking, most expressionless Pokémon we've seen yet", and as a result not only did it become far more popular than Zeraora but Schaefer felt it made players look forward to the upcoming games it would appear in.

In 2018 Pokémon Go's revenue saw a 37% increase, which Variety felt Meltan's debut significantly contributed to. IGN's Dale Bashir in a retrospective of what Pokémon impacted the franchise the most described Meltan as "legitimizing" Pokémon Go "as a valid way of playing Pokemon" by its exclusivity to the game, and was special in that unlike previous Mythical Pokémon in that anyone could access it. Gavin Lane of Nintendo Life felt it helped broaden the franchise's audience by how it linked Pokémon Go to the Let's Go series of games. Martin Wood of Game Rant on the other hand lamented that it was omitted from Pokémon Scarlet and Violet's introduction of "Paradox" Pokémon, Pokémon representing variants of existing creatures in the series as they appeared in the past or future. In particular he pointed out how Meltan and Melmetal's lore indicates that both are very ancient, but to him their modern hardware nut design contradicted it and a Paradox variation could not rectify this, but provide players with a different means to acquire Meltan.

After its full release, Comic Book Resources writer Aaron Fentress felt that Nintendo was still intentionally vague regarding the character, particularly in regards to what region of the game world it originated from. This in turn caused confusion within the gaming community, which often defined each "generation" of games by the region they were set in and release date, and as a result it is debated as to whether it should be associated with the seventh or eighth generation of Pokémon games. Fentress suggested this vagueness might have been intentional, comparing it to fan reactions to Mew or the Red and Blue glitch MissingNo., and that the lack of an official answer may have been Nintendo's way of keeping discussion regarding Meltan active.
