= Scopely =

American video game developer and publisher

Scopely, Inc.
- Type: Private
- Industry: Video games
- Predecessors: FoxNext
- Founded: March 2011; 15 years ago in Los Angeles, California, United States
- Founders: Walter Driver; Ankur Bulsara; Eytan Elbaz; Eric Futoran
- Headquarters: Culver City, California, U.S.
- Number of locations: 15+ (2026)
- Key people: Walter Driver (Co-CEO); Javier Ferreira (Co-CEO); Tim O’Brien (CRO); Ankur Bulsara (CTO); Eunice Lee (COO); Ben Webley (CMO); Phil Hardin (CFO)
- Products: Monopoly Go!; Star Trek Fleet Command; Yahtzee With Buddies; WWE Champions; Looney Tunes: World of Mayhem; Marvel Strike Force; Scrabble GO; Bingo Bash; Tiki Solitaire TriPeaks; Stumble Guys; Pokémon Go; Pikmin Bloom; Monster Hunter Now; Campfire; Wayfarer
- Number of employees: 3,901 (2026)
- Parent: Savvy Games Group (2023–present)
- Subsidiaries: DIGIT Game Studios; Pierplay; Genjoy; Omnidrone; GSN Games; Scopely Explore; Tag Games; Mirai; Loom Games
- Website: scopely.com

Scopely, Inc. (/ˈskoʊpli/ SKOHP-lee) is an American video game developer and publisher. The company is headquartered in Culver City, California, with offices across North America, Central America, EMEA and Asia, with its largest location in Barcelona, Spain.

Scopely has game development teams across the globe, both built from the ground up and through acquisition, and has partnered with external studios to create free-to-play games. Scopely develops both original games, and those based on existing entertainment brands.

Scopely is a subsidiary of Saudi Arabian Savvy Games Group, which purchased Scopely for $4.9 billion in 2023. As of 2024, Scopely ranked as the #2 mobile video game developer in the world and #1 in the U.S. by revenue.

== History ==
=== Founding and growth ===
Scopely was founded in 2011 in Los Angeles, California, by Walter Driver, Ankur Bulsara, Eric Futoran (later founded Embrace, acquired by Palo Alto Networks) and Eytan Elbaz. Previously, Elbaz co-founded Applied Semantics, which was acquired by Google in 2003, and Bulsara was a software developer at MySpace.

In 2014, former Disney Interactive and Electronic Arts executive Javier Ferreira joined Scopely. Former Disney Interactive executive Tim O'Brien joined in 2014 as chief revenue officer.

In October 2017, Scopely announced the opening of an office in Barcelona, Spain.

In June 2019, the company shared it had surpassed $1 billion in lifetime revenues.

In July 2021, the company invested $50 million in three games studios in Europe to co-create games and invest in developers.

Savvy Games Group announced its intent to acquire Scopely for $4.9 billion on April 5, 2023. The acquisition closed in July 2023. Scopely remains an independently operated company, headquartered in Culver City, California, part of the Savvy portfolio.

In January 2025, Scopely contributed to the FireAid benefit concert, produced by Irving Azoff, as a presenting sponsor to help wildfire relief efforts in the company's founding city of Los Angeles. Fundraising efforts from the benefit raised more than $100 million.

=== Acquisitions ===
In July 2014, Scopely acquired Space Inch's Disco Bees.

In May 2019, the company acquired Dublin-based DIGIT Game Studios, its collaborator on the mobile 4X strategy game Star Trek Fleet Command.

In January 2020, Scopely purchased FoxNext Games Los Angeles and its RPG game MARVEL Strike Force, along with Cold Iron Studios, from The Walt Disney Company for an undisclosed amount. Scopely later sold Cold Iron Studios to Daybreak Game Company.

In April 2020, the company acquired PierPlay game studio, its collaborator on the mobile word game Scrabble GO.

In October 2021, Scopely acquired Game Show Network's online gaming division (GSN Games) from Sony in a $1 billion cash and stock deal. Sony Pictures took a minority stake in the company as a result.

In 2022, the company acquired the mobile party battle royale game Stumble Guys from Kitka Games.

In June 2023, Scopely acquired Scotland-based Tag Games studio.

On March 12, 2025, Niantic, Inc. announced plans to sell the majority of its video game business to Scopely in a reported $3.5 billion deal, including games Pokémon Go, Pikmin Bloom, and Monster Hunter Now, and companion apps Campfire and Wayfarer. The deal was completed on May 29, 2025 with Niantic as a subsidiary of Scopely. Niantic's non-video game business, in addition to the games Ingress and Peridot, was spun-off into a separate entity named Niantic Spatial Inc, with Scopely investing $50 million to the company. A year after the acquisition, the team dropped the Niantic name, rebranding to Scopely Explore.

=== Recognition ===
In August 2015, Scopely ranked #9 on Inc.'s List of the 5,000 Fastest-Growing Companies in America, and #1 in the U.S.

In May 2024, Scopely was recognized by Time magazine on their annual TIME100 list recognizing the "100 Most Influential Companies in the World." In June 2025, the company made the list for the second consecutive year.

== Game development ==
=== Early years ===
In January 2012, Scopely launched its first free-to-play mobile game Dice With Buddies, followed that year by Jewels With Buddies and Bubble Galaxy With Buddies, which debuted as the #1 free app in the App Store. In April 2013, Scopely launched Mini Golf MatchUp. The game was #1 for free apps in the App Store in 49 countries and the #1 app on both the iPhone and the iPad in the U.S.

In September 2013, the company launched Wordly, a spelling game that reached #1 on the top free apps chart in the App Store, and was the first game with single-player mode developed by Scopely.

In November 2013, Scopely launched the Skee-ball game Skee-ball Arcade, which reached #1 overall in the Apple App Store.

=== Partnerships ===
In April 2015, Scopely partnered with Hasbro to launch the only officially licensed Yahtzee game, Yahtzee With Buddies, on iOS and Android. The game saw more than one million downloads in its first four days.

In May 2015, the company signed a multi-year partnership deal with Ireland's DIGIT Game Studios. The collaboration led to the 2019 acquisition of the studio.

In August 2015, Scopely partnered with The Walking Dead series creator Robert Kirkman and Skybound Entertainment to create The Walking Dead: Road to Survival, the first free-to-play mobile game based on the graphic novels. The game saw 4 million downloads in its first week, was a Top 25 Grossing Game in 17 countries, and became the 6th consecutive #1 game released by Scopely. In 2018, the game reached 40 million downloads since its release.

In 2016, the company partnered with Sony Pictures TV to launch Wheel of Fortune: Free Play, based on the television game show. The same year, Scopely released Dice With Ellen, a Yahtzee-style dice game featuring television host Ellen DeGeneres.

In 2017, Scopely announced a partnership with World Wrestling Entertainment and launched the match-3 game WWE Champions. It won a Webby Award for People's Voice in the sports games category.

By 2018, the company had four top-grossing games: WWE Champions, The Walking Dead: Road to Survival, Wheel of Fortune: Free Play, and Yahtzee With Buddies.

In November 2018, Scopely launched Star Trek Fleet Command, partnering with CBS Interactive and DIGIT Game Studios. The game went on to surpass $50 million in revenue in its first four months.

In December 2018, Scopely launched Looney Tunes World of Mayhem, a multi-player role-playing game featuring Looney Tunes characters licensed from Warner Bros. Interactive Entertainment, developed in partnership with Aquiris Game Studio. The game was downloaded more than one million times on its launch day.

In 2020, Scopely launched Scrabble GO. In June 2020, it was announced that the game was the "best launch ever for a mobile word game", based on figures of over 2.5 million people are playing daily for an average of 100 minutes each day.

In April 2023, the company launched Monopoly Go!, which became the biggest mobile game of 2023, generating $1 billion in revenue that year. By 2025, the mobile game went on to become the fastest in history to gross $3 billion.

In February 2024, Scopely ended its publishing partnership with Global Worldwide game studio on the title Kingdom Maker and redeployed the Scopely team supporting the project to other games.

== Funding ==
In 2013, Scopely raised a seed round of $8.5 million, led by Anthem Venture Partners, with participation from The Chernin Group, Greycroft Venture Partners, and New Enterprise Associates. In 2014, Scopely raised a $35 million Series A funding round, led by Evolution Media. In 2016, Scopely raised $55 million in Series B funding. In 2017, the company announced $60 million in Series C funding, led by Revolution Growth, and then raised an additional $100 million from Greenspring Associates in 2018.

In 2019, the company announced $200 million in Series D financing, valuing the company at $1.7 billion. In March 2020, the company announced another $200 million in Series D financing, valuing the company at $1.9 billion.

In October 2020, Scopely announced $340 million in Series E financing, valuing the company at $3.3 billion.
