= Augmented World Expo =

Annual conference on AR and VR

Augmented World Expo (or AWE) is an annual international conference, expo and awards show that is focused on the fields of augmented reality (AR), virtual reality (VR) and wearable technology. It is organized by AWE XR, LLC, with the mission of "Advancing augmented reality to advance humanity". They produce the events in USA, Europe and Asia, counting with the participation of numerous technology companies, such as Google or Intel and several relevant speakers in the field.

== Events ==
=== USA events ===
- AWE 2025 - Long Beach, California, USA
- AWE 2024 - Long Beach, California, USA
- AWE 2023 - Santa Clara, California, USA
- AWE 2022 - Santa Clara, California, USA
- AWE 2021 - Santa Clara, California, USA
- AWE 2020 - Santa Clara, California, USA
- AWE 2019 – Santa Clara, California, 10th anniversary
- AWE 2018 – Santa Clara, California, USA
- AWE 2017 – Santa Clara, California, USA
- AWE 2016
- AWE 2015
- AWE 2014
- AWE 2013

=== EU events ===
- UnitedXR 2025 - Bruxelles, Belgium - co-organized with Stereopsia
- AWE EU 2024 - Vienna, Austria
- AWE EU 2023 - Vienna, Austria
- AWE EU 2022 - Lisbon, Portugal
- AWE EU 2019 - Munich, Germany
- AWE EU 2018 – Munich, Germany
- AWE EU 2017 – Munich, Germany
- AWE EU 2016 - Berlin, Germany

=== Israel events ===
- AWE Israel 2018 – Tel Aviv, Israel

=== Asia events ===
- AWE Asia 2016

== Auggie Awards ==
AWE also gives out the Auggie Awards, which showcases development in AR and VR technology. The award began in 2010 and is held every year.
