= WebAR =

Web technology

WebAR, previously known as the Augmented Web, is a web technology that allows for augmented reality functionality within a web browser. It is a combination of HTML, Web Audio, WebGL, and WebRTC. From 2020s more known as web-based Augmented Reality or WebAR, which is about the use of augmented reality elements in browsers.

Since the early 2020s, WebAR has been standardized through the WebXR Device API, developed by the W3C Immersive Web Working Group. As of June 2026, the WebXR Device API has reached W3C Candidate Recommendation Draft status, the last formal checkpoint before a specification is considered finished. The WebXR Augmented Reality Module – Level 1, which extends the core API with AR-specific functionality, is also maintained by the same working group.

== Features ==
Browser augmented reality for smartphones has a number of features that distinguish it from similar content in special apps.

- No special applications are needed for Web AR. A regular browser is enough. And it can run to a certain extent on most browsers.
- It is easy to set up marketing analytics. By connecting the website to services that collect statistics, it is convenient to receive geographic coordinates, demographic characteristics and other information about users.
- Ability to add a CTA button. It is extremely important for marketing websites to place it so that the user can add contact information or place an order after considering the offer.
- Rich content. Browser augmented reality for tablets and smartphones supports 2D and 3D graphics, animation and other formats.
- Image marker tracking. If a QR code is selected as an activator for an AR element or just a picture on a flat surface, the device can easily read it.
- Various activation ways. Web AR can be marker and markerless, attached to geolocation, it can also be hidden in a direct link.
- Game content. Even simple games with simple mechanics, transferred into augmented reality, can delight the website visitor.
- Cross-platform. You can view content that complements our usual reality using any modern smartphone model.

== Limitations ==
- Performance is simply better on an app, where there is capacity for more memory, and programs are executed in native code - therefore it provides better visuals, better animations and better interactivity than in WebAR experience.
- A web page can only have access to certain parts of the device you're using, whereas a native app can access all of a device's capabilities. Meaning if you want the convenience of WebAR, you need to be thinking of simple but effective experiences instead.
- Compatibility - not every mobile device has the required HW for AR performance.

== Implementation ==
- Browser support is evolving quickly and can best be monitored using services like Can I Use.
- Since this is a web application, there are platforms that support the creation of WebAR that are similar to normal web development platforms. Something which enables the creation of 3D assets and environments using a web framework that looks similar to HTML. Applications (like for example – A-Frame) are supported by 8th Wall, which is by the end of 2021 the leading SLAM tracking SDK for WebAR on the market.
- WebAR is currently limited mostly by the browser – so how much the technology will develop rather depends on what the big players like Google and Apple develop. For iOS device users, Apple developed AR Quick Look, an extension that enables users to use ARKit on the web. For Android devices your browser should support WebXR, an API that allows users to view AR/VR content without installing extra plugins or software, and have ARCore installed.
- There are many tools and frameworks that help developers in expanding the immersive web with WebAR. For example, AR.js is an open-source library for Augmented Reality on the Web for improved WebAR performance on smartphones that includes marker-based technology (simplified QR-codes) and location-based AR. Apple at the WWDC Conference 2018, announced that it has developed a new file format, working together with Pixar, called USDZ Universal. This file will allow developers to create 3d models for augmented reality. USDZ format was created by Apple together with Pixar Animation Studio and allowed developers to create 3D models for AR.
- For a comprehensive list of AR development tools and platforms, see List of software related to augmented reality. One example of a no-code WebAR creation platform is Kivicube by Kivisense, which allows users to build and publish AR experiences entirely in a browser.

== Industries ==
Where WebAR can be used from virtual guides, which can help students navigate through campus to virtual film posters:

- E-commerce and Advertising.
- Education.
- Entertainment.
- Business.
- Fashion.

== Examples ==
- Promotion of Spider-Man: Into the Spider-Verse for which 8th Wall developed the AR platform that made this interactive WebAR promoting the Sony animated smash hit. Everyone can invite teenage Spiderman/Miles Morales into their homes for some one-on-one interaction, take pictures and share the experience with friends. Sony Pictures included the QR code to launch this WebAR site in print promotions for the movie. Also in 2017 the advertising of Jumanji: The Next Level gave us the world's first WebAR activation with usage of Amazon Lex to power voice interaction (the same tool that powers Amazon Alexa), the experience sends users on a wild 3D adventure into the world of Jumanji! This was a collaboration between Sony Pictures and Trigger - The Mixed Reality Agency. The WebAR technology is powered by 8th Wall. And you can check it via the link to the official YouTube recording of the experience.
- RPR & Microsoft's Holographic Retail Platform, where Web AR brings a new twist to online shopping by allowing users to interact with 3D holographic images of models right from their smartphones' browsers. This experience is designed to increase buyer confidence and reduce clothing returns, which are two of the greatest challenges to purchasing clothing online.
- Digital Porsche Brand Academy was developed by the Team of svarmony Technologies GmbH and it is the first-to-market training tool that uses augmented reality to provide Porsche employees an immersive experience learning about the company's history and values. The star of this WebAR experience is an animated avatar that serves as a tour guide for Porsche's past, present, and future. Employees can explore realistically animated Porsche-locations, take a ride in a virtual Porsche, help assemble a car, and test Porsche knowledge via a quiz. The Digital Porsche Brand Academy is a great starter kit for employees to establish a relationship with the brand and align with the company's plans.

== Future ==
By freeing smartphone users from having to install numerous apps, WebAR can make Augmented Reality far more accessible for them and more beneficial for business. The further development of the WebAR can be accelerated by the widespread social acceptance of the headsets that can give the whole other level of AR experience. This means instant access to the information when the contextually relevant content is appearing as the person's real background is changing.

== See also ==
- Web Audio
- WebGL
- WebRTC
