= Ashan Pillai =

British violist (born 1969)

- Born: 1 December 1969 (age 56); Colombo, Sri Lanka
- Education: Royal Academy of Music, London; University of Southern California, Los Angeles; Banff Center for the Arts, Canada; Juilliard School, New York
- Occupations: Violist and Professor
- Children: Amalia Pillai and Priyanka Pillai (born 2009)
- Parent(s): Cynthia Srikanthi Pillai ( née Subramanium), R Romesh Narayana Vallipuram Pillai

Ashan Pillai (born 1 December 1969 in Colombo, Sri Lanka) is a British violist. He was educated as a music and academic scholar at Merchant Taylors School, London and then at the Royal Academy of Music, London, the University of Southern California, Los Angeles, the Banff Center for the Arts, Alberta, Canada, and the Juilliard School, New York City. His principal teachers were John White, and distinguished American pedagogues and former students of William Primrose, Donald McInnes and Karen Tuttle.

Between 1994 and 1998 he won several prizes at international and national competitions including the Tertis and Rome International Competitions, the Royal Overseas League and Park Lane Group Competitions in London and Artists International in New York. These successes led to acclaimed debuts in London's Wigmore Hall and Purcell Room (1997–1999), New York's Carnegie Hall and festivals throughout the world including Kuhmo, Salzburg, Tanglewood, Banff, Ravinia, Aspen, Casals (Puerto Rico, France and Barcelona), and Schleswig-Holstein. He has premiered works (many dedicated to him) by noted Spanish composers Anton Garcia Abril, Leonardo Balada, Francisco Fleta Polo and others, and also works by Krzysztof Penderecki, Wolfgang Rihm and Gavin Bryars.

Pillai has performed as soloist under the batons of Christian Zacharias, Eiji Oue, Andrew Parrott, Christopher Hogwood, Robert King and Lawrence Foster, with the English, Gulbenkian, Czech, Andorran and Scottish Chamber Orchestras, as well as I Musici, London and New York, several Spanish orchestras and collaborated with the likes of Lynn Harrell, the Kreutzer and Brodsky Quartets, and the Ensemble Modern, Frankfurt.

He was assistant principal violist in the English Chamber Orchestra (1995–2000), co-founding member of the Mobius Ensemble (London 1997–2006), violist in the Zukerman Chamber Players (New York/Ottawa 2004–2010), violist in the Trio Cervello (Barcelona 2016– ) with pianist Enrique Bagaria and clarinetist Josep Fuster, and principal violist with the Barcelona Symphony Orchestra (2000–2018). Pillai is Professor of Viola at Escola Superior de Música de Catalunya ( ESMUC) (from 2001), the Conservatori Superior del Liceu in Barcelona (from 2008) the Alfonso X El Sabio University in Madrid (from 2012). In 2014, he was appointed chair of viola and chamber music in Música en Compostela, the historic music festival which specializes in Spanish music.The distinguished faculty voted him as Artistic Director in August 2023. In 2020, Pillai was appointed Artist in Residence and Visiting Professor at the Royal Academy of Music, London. The same institution appointed him Professor in 2021.

As a recording artist, Pillai has recorded widely for EMI, Naxos, ASV, Altara, Verso, Meridian, Bel, Columna, RTVE (Spanish Radio and Television), the BBC and Oehms Classics. His recordings include sonatas by Brahms, Bax, Debussy, Lluís Benejam, Felipe de los Rios, Juan Oliver Astorga, Mendelssohn, Naumann, Glinka, Schubert, Gerhard, and concerti by Hoffmeister, Mozart, Leonardo Balada and Josep Soler. Among Pillai's notable recordings are The Viola Sonatas from the Royal Palace in Madrid, The Virtuoso Viola in Spain, the Hoffmeister Works for Viola, and the string quintets recorded with Zukerman.

Pillai edited the 12 Estudios o caprichos de mediana dificultad (12 Studies or Capriccios of Medium Difficulty) for viola solo (1881) by José María Beltrán Fernández (1827–1907), published by Clivis Publications. In 2016 he edited the first edition of the 11 sonatas from the Royal Palace in Madrid (1770-1819) for Boileau Publications and released the first recording of this monumental collection of works for viola. He has also edited the Sonata en Re by Tomas Lestan ( 1884) for Edition Piles.

== Discography ==
Viola

- The First Viola Romantics; Ashan Pillai (viola); Juan Carlos Cornelles (piano); Nîbius NIBI 131 (2018)

Mikhail Glinka (1804–1857) – Sonata in D minor for viola and piano (1825–1828); unfinished; completed by Vadim Borisovsky
Felix Mendelssohn (1809–1847) – Sonata in C minor for viola and piano, MWV Q 14 (1823–1824)
Ernst Naumann (1832–1910) – Sonata in G minor for viola and piano, Op. 1 (1854)

- Reinecke: Música of Cámara para clarinete, viola y piano (Reinecke: Chamber Music for Clarinet, Viola and Piano); Trio Cervelló; Josep Fuster (clarinet); Ashan Pillai (viola); Enrique Bagaria (piano); Columna Música 1CM0373 (2017)

Phantasiestücke (Fantasy Pieces) for viola and piano, Op. 43 (1857)
Trio in A major for clarinet, viola and piano, Op. 264 (1903)

- The Virtuoso Viola in Spain (1880–1910); Ashan Pillai (viola); Juan Carlos Cornelles (piano); Nîbius NIBI 127 (2017)

Tomás Lestán (1827–1908) – Sonata for viola and piano (1884)
Manuel Sancho (1870?–1931) – Solo en Re (Solo in D) for viola and piano (1908)
Conrado del Campo – Pequeña pieza for viola and piano, Op. 6 (1906)
José María Beltrán (1827–1907) – 12 Caprichos for viola solo (1881)

- Schumann: Música of Cámara para clarinete, viola y piano (Schumann: Chamber Music for Clarinet, Viola and Piano); Trio Cervelló; Josep Fuster (clarinet); Ashan Pillai (viola); Enrique Bagaria (piano); Columna Música 1CM0357 (2016)

Adagio and Allegro for viola and piano, Op. 70 (1849)
Märchenbilder for viola and piano, Op. 113 (1851)
Märchenerzählungen for clarinet, viola and piano, Op. 132 (1853)

- The Royal Palace in Madrid: Eleven Viola Sonatas (1778–1818); Ashan Pillai (viola); Juan Carlos Cornelles (piano); Nîbius NIBI 122 (2016)

Juan Balado (?–1832) – Sonata in A major (1818)
Gaetano Brunetti – Sonata in D major (1789)
Felipe de los Ríos (1745–1801) – 3 Sonatas (1778–1781)
José Lidón – Sonata in D minor (1806)
Juan Oliver y Astorga – 5 Sonatas (1803–1807)

- Leonardo Balada – Concerto for Viola and Wind Ensemble (2009–2010); Ashan Pillai (viola); Carnegie Mellon Wind Ensemble; Naxos 8.573064 (2015)
- Brahms: The Viola Sonatas / Herzogenberg: Three Legends; Ashan Pillai (viola); Juan Carlos Cornelles (piano); Verso VRS 2157 (2015)

Johannes Brahms – Sonata No. 1 in F minor for viola and piano, Op. 120 No. 1 (1894)
Johannes Brahms – Sonata No. 2 in E♭ major for viola and piano, Op. 120 No. 2 (1894)
Heinrich von Herzogenberg – 3 Legenden (3 Legends) for viola and piano, Op. 62 (1889)

- Sonatas Españolas para Viola y Piano (Spanish Sonatas for Viola and Piano); Ashan Pillai (viola); Juan Carlos Cornelles (piano); Verso VRS 2149 (2013)

Conrado del Campo – Romanza in F major for viola and piano, Op. 5 (1901)
Francisco Fleta Polo – Sonata "Cantares del mío Cid" for viola and piano, Op. 62 (1962)
Roberto Gerhard – Sonata for viola and piano (1948)
Jordi Cervelló – Tertis Sonata for viola and piano (2012)

- Josep Soler i Sardà – Poema de Vilafranca for viola, oboe, English horn, organ and chamber orchestra (1995); Ashan Pillai (viola), Eiji Oue (conductor), Barcelona Symphony and Catalonia National Orchestra; Edicions Albert Moraleda 0220 (2010)
- 20th Century Catalan Composers, Volume 6: Viola Works; Ashan Pillai (viola); Columna Música 1CM0207 (2010)

Joaquim Homs – 2 Monòlegs (2 Monologues) for viola solo (1979–1980); Seqüència for viola solo (1982)
Francisco Fleta Polo – Sonata for viola solo (1990)
Francesc Taverna-Bech – Cicle for viola solo, Op. 39 (1978)
Jordi Cervelló – Llegenda for viola solo (2000); Souvenir for viola solo (2000)
Benet Casablancas – Peça... De música d'un ballet for viola solo (1980)

- Només les flors: Catalan Works for Viola and Piano; Ashan Pillai (viola), Albert Giménez (piano); Columna Música 1CM0238 (2009)

Ricard Lamote de Grignon – Scherzino for viola and piano (1943)
Salvador Brotons – Sonata for viola and piano, Op. 28 (1982)
Xavier Montsalvatge – Pregària a Santiago for viola and piano (1999)
Narcís Bonet – Sonatina d'estiu (Summer Sonatina) for viola and piano (1952)
Federico Mompou – Damunt de tu, només les flors; Pastoral; Llueve sobre el río; Aureana do sil; Rosa del camí; Cortina de fullatge; Incertitud; Neu
El cant dels ocells (Song of the Birds, Catalan traditional melody)

- Kalliwoda and Schubert; Ashan Pillai (viola), Michael Endres (piano); Oehms Classics, OC591 (2007)

Franz Schubert – "Arpeggione" Sonata in A minor for viola and piano, D.821
Johann Wenzel Kalliwoda – Six Nocturnes for viola and piano, Op.186
Franz Schubert – 5 Songs from "Schwanengesang", D.957 (arranged for viola and piano)

- Heitor Villa-Lobos – Duo for Violin and Viola (1946); Ashan Pillai (viola), Philippe Honoré (violin); Naxos (2006)
- Franz Anton Hoffmeister – Complete Works for Viola; Ashan Pillai (viola), Gulbenkian Orchestra, Christopher Hogwood (conductor); Oehms Classics, OC334 (2004)

Concerto in B♭ major for viola and orchestra
Concerto in D major for viola and orchestra
12 Studies for solo viola

- Lluís Benejam – Sonata "Moments musicals" for viola and piano (1952); Ashan Pillai (viola), Albert Attenelle (piano); ASV Living Era (2004)
- Claude Debussy – Sonata for Flute, Viola and Harp; Ashan Pillai (viola), Lorna McGhee (flute), Alison Nicholls (harp); EMI 73162 (2003)
- Morceaux intimes; Ashan Pillai (viola), Alison Nicholls (harp), Lorna McGhee (flute); Meridian (2002)

Camille Saint-Saëns – Le cygne (The Swan), from The Carnival of the Animals (transcription for viola and piano)
Claude Debussy – Beau soir (transcription for viola and piano)
Maurice Ravel – Pavane pour une infante défunte (transcription for viola and piano)
Maurice Ravel – Pièce en forme de habanera
Gabriel Fauré – Après un rêve, Op. 7 (transcription for viola and piano)

- Arnold Bax – Fantasy Sonata for viola and harp (1927); Ashan Pillai (viola), Alison Nicholls (harp); Naxos 8554507 (2000)

Chamber music

- Zukerman Chamber Players, Mozart and Dvořák Quintets; Altara ALT1025 (2007)
- Zukerman Chamber Players, Mozart and Brahms Quintets; Altara ALT1011 (2005)

Wolfgang Amadeus Mozart – String Quintet in C major, K.515
Johannes Brahms – String Quintet No.2 in G major, Op.111

- Herbert Howells: Chamber Music; Mobius; Naxos 8557188 (2005)

Rhapsodic Quintet for clarinet and string quartet, Op.31 (1919)

- Jean Françaix – Three Quintets; Mobius; ASV Digital CD DCA 1090 (2000)

Quintet for clarinet and string quartet (1977)
Quintet No.1 for flute, violin, viola, cello and harp (1934)
Quintet No.2 for flute, violin, viola, cello and harp (1989)

- Heitor Villa-Lobos – Chamber Music; Mobius; Naxos 8557765 (2006)

Quintet for flute, violin, viola, cello and harp, W 538 (1957)
Duo for violin and viola, W 463 (1946)

== Editions ==
Music scores edited by Pillai

- José María Beltrán: 12 Caprichos per a Viola, Clivis Publications, ISMN 979-0-3502-1055-6
- Sonatas para viola de la Real Capilla (1778–1818) series:

Felipe de los Ríos: 3 Sonatas, Editorial de Música Boileau, ISMN 979-0-3503-3705-5
Gaetano Brunetti: Sonata en Re Mayor (1789), Editorial de Música Boileau, ISMN 979-0-3053-3706-2
Juan Oliver y Astorga: 5 Sonatas, Editorial de Música Boileau, ISMN 979-0-3503-3707-9
José Lidón: Sonata en Re Menor (1806), Editorial de Música Boileau, ISMN 979-0-3503-3708-6
Juan Balado: Sonata en La Mayor (1818), Editorial de Música Boileau, ISMN 979-0-3503-3709-3
Manuel Sancho: Solo en Re Mayor (1908), Editorial de Música Boileau, ISMN 979-0-3503-3824-3

- Tomás Lestán; Sonata para Viola, Piles Editorial, PIL1783, ISMN 979-0-3505-1147-9
