= Fox Digital Entertainment =

American digital media company

- Type: Division
- Founded: 2010; 16 years ago
- Defunct: 2017; 9 years ago
- Fate: Merged with 20th Century Fox Games to form FoxNext
- Successor: FoxNext
- Products: Mobile applications, video games
- Services: Digital content
- Parent: Fox Entertainment Group (21st Century Fox)

Fox Digital Entertainment was an American digital content, mobile applications, and video game developer and publisher owned by 20th Century Fox (later rebranded as 20th Century Studios).

== History ==
Fox Digital Entertainment was formed in 2010 and took on many of the projects related to 21st Century Fox properties from Fox Interactive, 20th Century Fox Games (now known as 20th Century Games since 2022) and Fox Mobile Entertainment, when that was sold to the Jesta Group and was renamed Jesta Digital.

== Projects ==
It was primarily involved with 20th Century Studios and Metro-Goldwyn-Mayer properties such as Family Guy, The Simpsons, Ice Age, James Bond, Predator, Rio, Sons of Anarchy, and X-Men. It has been involved in applications such as FOX 4D, Own The Moments, Skyfall Gun Barrel and The Wolverine Second Screen. They have also been involved in video games such as The Chronicles of Narnia: The Voyage of the Dawn Treader, Family Guy: The Quest for Stuff, The Simpsons: Tapped Out, and Predators.

=== List of mobile applications ===
See List of video games for mobile video games

| Title | First Release Date | Platform(s) |
|---|---|---|
| Chipwrecked: Chipmunk Coloring | July 3, 2013 | Android |
| The Croods Coloring Storybook | September 30, 2013 | Android |
| Epic Coloring and Storybook | October 8, 2013 | Android |
| FOX 4D | November 25, 2013 | Android, iOS |
| Fox Digital Copy | August 30, 2013 | Android |
| FoxFast eBrochure | July 24, 2013 | iOS |
| Own The Moments | June 18, 2012 | Android, iOS |
| Prometheus Weyland Corp App | January 28, 2014 | Android, iOS |
| Rio: Coloring with Blu | July 3, 2013 | Android |
| Skyfall Gun Barrel | February 18, 2013 | Android, iOS |
| Sons of Anarchy | October 24, 2013 | Android |
| The Wolverine Second Screen | December 18, 2013 | Android, iOS |
| X-Men Movies Cerebro | May 23, 2014 | Android, iOS |

== List of video games ==
| Title | First Release Date | Platform(s) | Developer | Publisher |
|---|---|---|---|---|
| The Chronicles of Narnia: The Voyage of the Dawn Treader | November 18, 2010 | iOS | Gameloft | Fox Digital Entertainment |
| Angry Birds Rio | March 22, 2011 | iOS, Android, OS X, Windows, Symbian, WebOS, BlackBerry Tablet OS, Windows Phone | Rovio Entertainment; Fox Digital Entertainment; Blue Sky Studios | Rovio Entertainment |
| The Simpsons: Tapped Out | March 1, 2012 | Android, iOS | EA Mobile; Fox Digital Entertainment; Gracie Films | EA Mobile |
| AVP: Evolution | August 6, 2014 | Android, iOS, Ouya | Angry Mob Games | Fox Digital Entertainment |
| Family Guy: The Quest for Stuff | April 10, 2014 | Android, iOS | TinyCo | Fox Digital Entertainment |
| Ice Age: Pirate Picasso | July 3, 2013 | Android, iOS | | Fox Digital Entertainment |
| Kung Fu Panda ProtectTheValley | November 6, 2013 | Android, iOS | | Fox Digital Entertainment |
| Movie Slam | July 22, 2013 | Facebook, iOS | | Fox Digital Entertainment |
| Predators | October 8, 2013 | Android, iOS | Angry Mob Games | Fox Digital Entertainment |
