= Alexander Horowitz =

- Education: Royal Conservatoire of Scotland (BMus); Glasgow School of Art (MDes, MSc, PhD)
- Occupation: Composer
- Years active: 2011–present
- Employer: Electronic Arts
- Notable work: Battlefield 6; Hogwarts Legacy; Crisis on the Planet of the Apes VR; Planet of the Apes: Last Frontier
- Website: www.alexanderhorowitz.com

Alexander Horowitz (born January 1991) is a British composer and pianist. He studied at the Royal Conservatoire of Scotland and the Glasgow School of Art. Horowitz received a BAFTA New Talent nomination in 2011. In 2013, Horowitz created the score for the Scottish short film The Groundsman, starring David O'Hara. The same year, Horowitz created a score for the theatre show Toi Toi Toi. Horowitz's score blended themes from Mozart, Rossini, and Giuseppe Verdi with his original compositions.

In 2020, Horowitz accompanied the harpist Heidi Krutzen for a performance of Alexander Scriabin's Etude.

He is the creative craft director at Electronic Arts in Guildford, and was previously head of audio at the games division of The Imaginarium in London, and the audio lead at Studio Gobo in Hove, which produced Hogwarts Legacy. Horowitz's score incorporated some motifs from John Williams' original Harry Potter score with subdued whimsical pieces that accompanied the player's journey around the role-playing video game's open world. His works The Room of Hidden Things and A Focused Mind appear on the Hogwarts Legacy album Study Themes from the Original Video Game Soundtrack.

== Accessibility work ==
Horowitz's doctoral research at the Glasgow School of Art led to SoundTown, an accessible music game designed for children and young people with complex physical and cognitive needs. The game was built in Unity and Wwise and can be played using one or two switches or buttons.

== Professional service ==
Horowitz is President Elect of the Independent Society of Musicians. He has also served as a judge for the Worshipful Company of Musicians' Video Game Composition Award.

== Selected works ==
He has created film and theatre scores and worked on video game music for Avalanche Software, EA Tiburon, Rockstar Games and Warner Bros.

Year	Title	Role	Studio/developer
2025	Battlefield 6	Creative craft director	Electronic Arts
2023	Hogwarts Legacy	Audio lead	Avalanche Software
2018	Crisis on the Planet of the Apes VR	Head of audio	Imaginati
2017	Planet of the Apes: Last Frontier	Head of audio	Imaginati
2016	Madden NFL 17	Audio production assistant	EA Sports

== Awards and honors ==
Year	Award	Category	Result	Ref.
2011	BAFTA New Talent Awards	Original Music	Nominated	
2023	Scottish Games Awards	Diversity Champion	Nominated	
2024	GAConf Awards	Best motor/mobility accessibility	Nominated	

== Publications ==
- Horowitz, Alexander (2024). "Accessibility by Numbers: A Critical Review of Game Accessibility Guidelines". In Spöhrer, M.; Ochsner, B. (eds.), Disability and Video Games. Palgrave Macmillan. ISBN 9783031343735.
