= Conor Meechan =

Scottish film editor

- Born: East Kilbride, Scotland
- Education: Royal Conservatoire of Scotland; National Film and Television School
- Occupation: Film editor
- Years active: 2013–present
- Notable work: The Groundsman; My Mum Tracy Beaker; The Demon Headmaster

Conor Meechan (born 1993) is a Scottish film editor. He is best known for editing the film, The Groundsman which earned him the Best Editor accolade at the 2014 British Academy Scotland New Talent Awards.

== Life and career ==
Conor studied Digital Film and Television at the Royal Conservatoire of Scotland. During his time there, he edited The Groundsman, the graduation film of fellow student Jonny Blair. His work on the film was widely praised and in 2014, he went on to win the Best Editor accolade at the 2014 British Academy Scotland New Talent Awards. He went on to study at the National Film and Television School where he won the Avid Award for Excellence in Editing for his work on the short film Fake News Fairytale.

Conor's recent work includes editing My Mum Tracy Beaker.

== Selected filmography ==
| Year | Film | Director(s) |
|---|---|---|
| 2013 | The Groundsman | Jonny Blair |
| 2013 | Happy Birthday to Me | Peter Mackie Burns |
| 2015 | The Sparticle Mystery | Colin McIvor |
| 2016 | Regression | Johnny Kenton |
| 2018 | Moth | Ewa Luczkow |
| 2018 | Fake News Fairytale | Kate Stonehill |
| 2018 | Dead Birds | Johnny Kenton |
| 2019 | River City | Various |
| 2019 | The Demon Headmaster | John McKay |
| 2021 | My Mum Tracy Beaker | John McKay |
| 2021 | The Day I Ran Away | Sigurd Kølster Trøye |
| 2021 | The Harbour | Sam Ainsworth |
| 2023 | Lovely Little Farm | Matt René |
| 2024 | The Primrose Railway Children | Julian Kemp |

== Awards and nominations ==
| Year | Nominated Work | Award | Category | Result |
|---|---|---|---|---|
| 2014 | The Groundsman | British Academy Scotland New Talent Awards | Best Editor | Won |
| 2018 | Fake News Fairytale | National Film and Television School | Avid Award for Excellence in Editing | Won |
| 2026 | The Primrose Railway Children | Children's and Family Emmy Awards | Outstanding Editing for a Preschool or Children's Live Action Program | Nominated |

== See also ==
- The Groundsman
- 2014 British Academy Scotland New Talent Awards
