= 2014 British Academy Scotland New Talent Awards =

- Date: 25 March 2014
- Site: The Arches (Glasgow); Scotland
- Hosted by: Muriel Gray

Television coverage
- Network: Streaming webcast

The 2014 British Academy Scotland New Talent Awards were held on 25 March 2014 at The Arches (Glasgow). Presented by BAFTA Scotland, the accolades honour the best upcoming talent in the field of film and television in Scotland. The Nominees were announced on 7 March 2014. The ceremony was hosted by Muriel Gray.

== Winners and nominees ==
Winners are listed first and highlighted in boldface.

| Best Fiction Film | Best Acting Performance |
|---|---|
| **The Groundsman**: Joyride; A Practical Guide To A Spectacular Suicide | **Julie Speers – Wyld as Julie**: Jasmine Main – Bear With Me as Angel; Graeme McGeagh – A Practical Guide to a Spectacular Suicide |
| Best Writer | Best Comedy/Entertainment Programme |
| **Michael Crumley – Hannah**: Jonny Blair – The Groundsman; Gabriel Robertson – Bucket | **Fistpunch – Ruth Gallacher, Ally Lockhart**: The Arsehole Gene – Eric Romero; Dolly's House – Marie-Cecile Murphy, Christopher Sneddon |
| Best Director of Photography | Best Editor |
| **Ansgar Hoeckh – Judas Goat**: Laura Wadha - Hester | **Conor Meechan – The Groundsman**: Sanja Marjanovic – BFF; Jenny Crook – Situation Normal All Fucked Up |
| Best Factual | Best Original Music |
| **Finding Family – Carol Cooke, Chris Leslie, Garret Tankosic Kelly, Oggi Tomic**: Radio Silence – Duncan Cowles, Scott Willis; Red Dust – Ilona Kacieja | **Jessica Jones – Hannah**: Alec Cheer, Drew Wright – Sarah's Room; Tim Courtney – Sunsets & Silhouettes |
| Best Sound Design | Best Production Design |
| **Paul Kowalik – Out Of The Ash**: Cliff Rossiter – Loyal; Will Cory – Sarah's Room | **Ailsa Williams – Hello From Earth**: Sharon Kaye – Loyal; 'Eve Murray – Black Night Broken, White Morning Woken |
| Best Game | Best Animation |
| **Lub Vs Dub – Futuro**: Attack of the Ghastly Grey Matter – Milksteak and the Jellybeans; 9.03M – Space Budgie | **Spectators – Ross Hogg**: In Sight – Alexandru Nechifor; The House With No Doors – Oana Nechifor |

=== Special Award for New Work ===
- Finding Family

== See also ==
- 2014 British Academy Scotland Awards
