= Hogwarts Legacy =

2023 video game

- Developer: Avalanche Software (Note: Nintendo Switch version ported by Shiver Entertainment)
- Publisher: Warner Bros. Games (Note: Published under the Portkey Games label)
- Director: Alan Tew
- Composers: Chuck E. Myers; J. Scott Rakozy; Peter Murray
- Series: Wizarding World
- Engine: Unreal Engine 4
- Platforms: PlayStation 5; Windows; Xbox Series X/S; PlayStation 4; Xbox One; Nintendo Switch; Nintendo Switch 2
- Release: PS5, Windows, Xbox Series X/S; 10 February 2023; PS4, Xbox One; 5 May 2023; Nintendo Switch; 14 November 2023; Nintendo Switch 2; 5 June 2025
- Genre: Action role-playing
- Mode: Single-player

Hogwarts Legacy is a 2023 action role-playing video game developed by Avalanche Software and published by Warner Bros. Games under its Portkey Games label. It is part of the Wizarding World franchise, taking place a century before the Harry Potter novels. Players control a student enrolled at the magical Hogwarts School of Witchcraft and Wizardry who attends classes, learns spells, and explores Hogwarts Castle and its surroundings. With the assistance of fellow students and professors, the protagonist embarks on a journey to uncover an ancient secret hidden within the wizarding world.

Following Warner Bros.' acquisition of Avalanche Software in 2017, Hogwarts Legacy became the studio's first project unrelated to Disney Interactive Studios since 2005. Officially announced in 2020, the game cost an estimated $150 million to produce. The storyline was designed to take place in a period largely untouched by established Wizarding World characters, offering players the opportunity to immerse themselves in their own distinct universe. Avalanche emphasised the importance of having the game resemble the Harry Potter novels, while also expanding beyond known locations to enrich the experience.

Hogwarts Legacy was highly anticipated, according to several publications. It attracted controversy over Harry Potter creator J. K. Rowling's views on transgender people and accusations of antisemitic tropes, leading to calls for a boycott. The early-access period of Hogwarts Legacy resulted in record-breaking viewership on streaming platform Twitch, making it the most-watched single-player game on the platform. Following some delays, it was released on 10 February 2023 for PlayStation 5, Windows, and Xbox Series X/S, on 5 May 2023 for PlayStation 4 and Xbox One, on 14 November 2023 for Nintendo Switch, and on 5 June 2025 for Nintendo Switch 2.

Hogwarts Legacy received positive reviews from game critics, who praised its combat, world design, characters, variety of content, and faithfulness to the source material, but criticized its technical problems at release and lack of innovation as an open-world game. In its first two weeks, it sold over 12 million copies and generated $850 million in global sales revenue. It became one of the best-selling video games, selling 40 million copies and reaching $1 billion in total revenue. Hogwarts Legacy appeared on several publications' year-end lists and received accolades including nominations at the BAFTA Games Awards, D.I.C.E. Awards, and Grammy Awards.

== Synopsis ==
=== Setting and characters ===
Hogwarts Legacy is set in the 1890s at Hogwarts School of Witchcraft and Wizardry and its surrounding areas. The areas include magical village Hogsmeade and the Scottish Highlands, influenced by the Wizarding World franchise. Players take on the role of a student (voiced by Sebastian Croft or Amelia Gething) starting their studies at Hogwarts in the fifth year. The protagonist can control a mysterious form of ancient magic that threatens the stability of the wizarding world. Their mission is to discover the reasons behind the resurgence of this forgotten magic and stand against those who are trying to harness its power.

Professor Eleazar Fig (Nicholas Guy Smith), a wizard who teaches magic theory at Hogwarts, is a central ally throughout the protagonist's adventure. Other characters include Hogwarts students Amit Thakkar (Asif Ali) and Everett Clopton (Luke Youngblood), Professors Onai (Kandace Caine) and Shah (Sohm Kapila), as well as Headmaster Phineas Nigellus Black (Simon Pegg) and Professor Matilda Weasley (Lesley Nicol). The protagonist also partners with students Natsai Onai, Poppy Sweeting, Sebastian Sallow and Ominis Gaunt, who serve as companion characters. Antagonists include Ranrok, the leader of a goblin rebellion, and Victor Rookwood, the leader of a group of Dark Wizards.

=== Plot ===
The protagonist receives a letter from Professor Matilda Weasley, which confirms their attendance at Hogwarts School of Witchcraft and Wizardry as a fifth-year student (Note: The protagonist's late enrolment is never fully explained. The story reveals that they are only the third student to enrol as a fifth-year.) and assigns Professor Eleazar Fig as the protagonist's mentor. Fig escorts the protagonist from London to Hogwarts via a flying coach. While investigating an unknown artefact, a dragon attacks them, prompting the two to reach for a Portkey hidden inside the artefact that teleports them to the Scottish Highlands. In the Highlands, they find a ruin with a portal to Gringotts. Using the Portkey to enter an old vault, the protagonist learns they can see traces of ancient magic. The duo is confronted by a hostile goblin named Ranrok before escaping to Hogwarts, where the protagonist is sorted into one of the four houses. The protagonist learns various spells during classes and goes on a trip to Hogsmeade with a companion, where they defeat a troll sent by Ranrok. The protagonist also sneaks into the library and finds a book with missing pages. While Fig studies the book, the protagonist locates the missing pages and finds a secret room below Hogwarts known as the Map Chamber. The protagonist visits the Map Chamber several times with Fig later in the game. They talk to the portraits of four deceased Hogwarts professors who refer to themselves as the "Keepers", whose goal is to protect the secrets of ancient magic from the wizarding world.

To reveal the secrets of ancient magic, the protagonist completes four trials left by the Keepers. Each trial leads to a Pensieve, a magical device used to store and review memories. The protagonist learns from these memories about Isidora Morganach, a Hogwarts student and later professor with abilities similar to the protagonist. Isidora was in conflict with the Keepers and left behind a hidden repository of ancient magic after using it to extract negative emotions, particularly from her suffering father. The Keepers realised that Isidora was inhaling the extracted emotions to increase her own power and failed to dissuade her, forcing one of them to eliminate her with the Killing Curse. Through their other adventures, the protagonist also learns that Ranrok, the leader of an ongoing goblin rebellion against wizards, seeks to find the repository and exploit it for his own ends. He collaborates with a group of dark wizards led by Victor Rookwood, a descendant of one of the Keepers, to locate it.

After the protagonist completes all four trials, they receive a final task from the Keepers: to create a special type of magic wand from the artefacts found at the Pensieves. Fig sends the protagonist to Gerbold Ollivander, a wandmaker, to craft the special wand. As the protagonist leaves Ollivander's, they are ambushed by Rookwood, who proposes an alliance against the goblins. The protagonist refuses, resulting in a battle in which the protagonist manages to defeat him. The protagonist and Professor Fig discover the repository. Ranrok interrupts them and destroys Isidora's repository. Absorbing the ancient power, he transforms himself into a dragon, injuring Fig. The protagonist defeats Ranrok, ending the goblin rebellion, and the protagonist makes a choice between keeping the ancient magic sealed away or absorbing the power for themselves. Regardless of their choice, Fig dies, and Headmaster Phineas Nigellus Black and Professor Weasley hold a eulogy in honour of him.

The protagonist returns to finish regular school studies and prepare for the O.W.L. exams at the end of the year. They also continue to explore the castle's surrounding areas and go through adventures with companions Sebastian Sallow, Ominis Gaunt, Poppy Sweeting, and Natsai Onai if they have not completed them already. The journey ends with Weasley awarding the protagonist 100 house points for their adventure, which leads to a House Cup win for their respective house.

== Gameplay ==
Hogwarts Legacy is an action role-playing video game played from a third-person perspective. Players create a character by customising features such as appearance, voice, and complexion. They choose whether to be housed in a witch or wizard dormitory and select one of the four Hogwarts Houses, (Note: Hogwarts houses are four grouped houses at Hogwarts founded by Godric Gryffindor, Helga Hufflepuff, Rowena Ravenclaw, and Salazar Slytherin. Students are sorted into houses by the Sorting Hat during a yearly Sorting Ceremony. Each house features students who display the abilities and personalities the founders wanted.) guided by the Sorting Hat. Each Hogwarts House (Gryffindor, Hufflepuff, Ravenclaw, and Slytherin) features a unique common room accessible only to its members and exclusive quests. Attending and completing classes is essential to progression, as it unlocks gameplay mechanics, such as broom flight. As the game advances, players learn to cast spells, brew potions, and master combat abilities, eventually developing a personalised combat style. Experience points are earned by completing quests and challenges, while a separate talent tree for enhancing spells and abilities unlocks as players progress through the game. Players can engage with various non-player characters (NPCs), and some of them become companions. Companions provide a series of side quests focused on relationships and can join players on select missions.

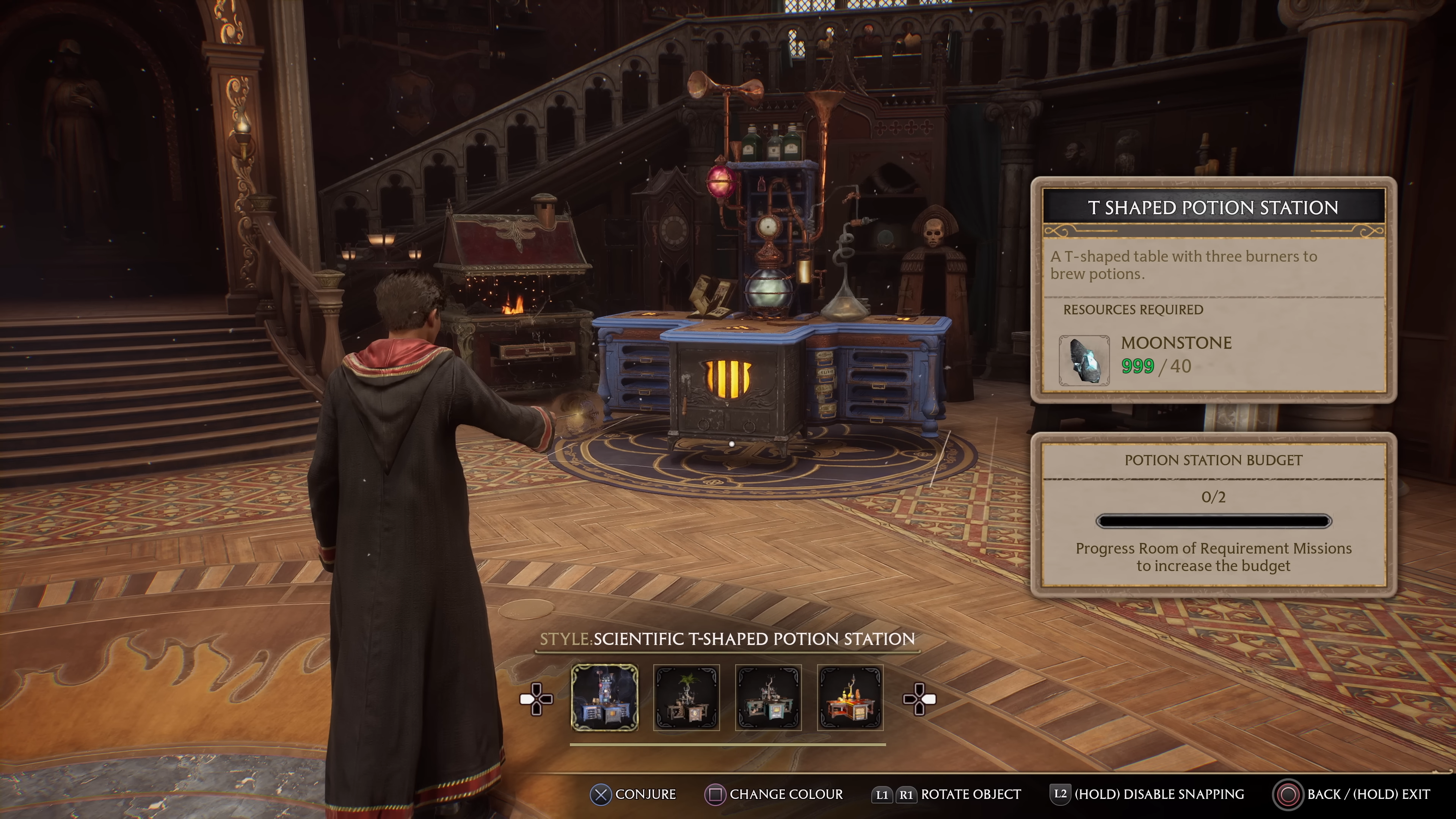
In the Room of Requirement, players can set up and customise elements such as potion stations.

Players can explore related areas such as Hogsmeade, the Forbidden Forest, and the Room of Requirement. Hogsmeade offers a variety of shops and establishments, including the sweet shop Honeydukes and the Hog's Head tavern. The Forbidden Forest features familiar magical creatures such as centaurs and spiders. The Room of Requirement features several customisation elements, allowing players to modify the room with various objects. It can be fully personalised, and its architecture can be changed through spells to conjure, alter or delete objects. The room serves as a place to store and maintain utility items such as brewing stations and planting pots, which can also be customised. The room further features vivariums, which are areas for magical beasts. Players can tame, care for, and ride various creatures, including hippogriffs and thestrals. Once caught, these creatures can be kept in vivariums. Other magical creatures available for interaction include unicorns, kneazles, and puffskeins. Plants grown or acquired can be used in combat, such as mandrakes, which can stun enemies.

Players can explore the open-world map at their own pace. Different areas offer a range of activities and players face various enemies, such as goblins, poachers, and trolls. Certain aspects are locked behind progression milestones in the main plot. During exploration, players can acquire gear by locating treasure chests. The Revelio spell supports exploration by acting as a scanning tool to discover secrets. Players may use Floo Powder to fast travel around the map or fly with a broom.

== Development ==
Hogwarts Legacy was developed by Avalanche Software, which Warner Bros. Interactive Entertainment acquired from Disney in January 2017. That same year, Warner Bros. established the publishing label Portkey Games to manage the Wizarding World licence. The game marked Avalanche's first project unrelated to Disney Interactive Studios and its products since 2005. The game was developed by using Unreal Engine 4. J. K. Rowling, the author of the Harry Potter series, was not directly involved in its development. The total budget was estimated at $150 million.

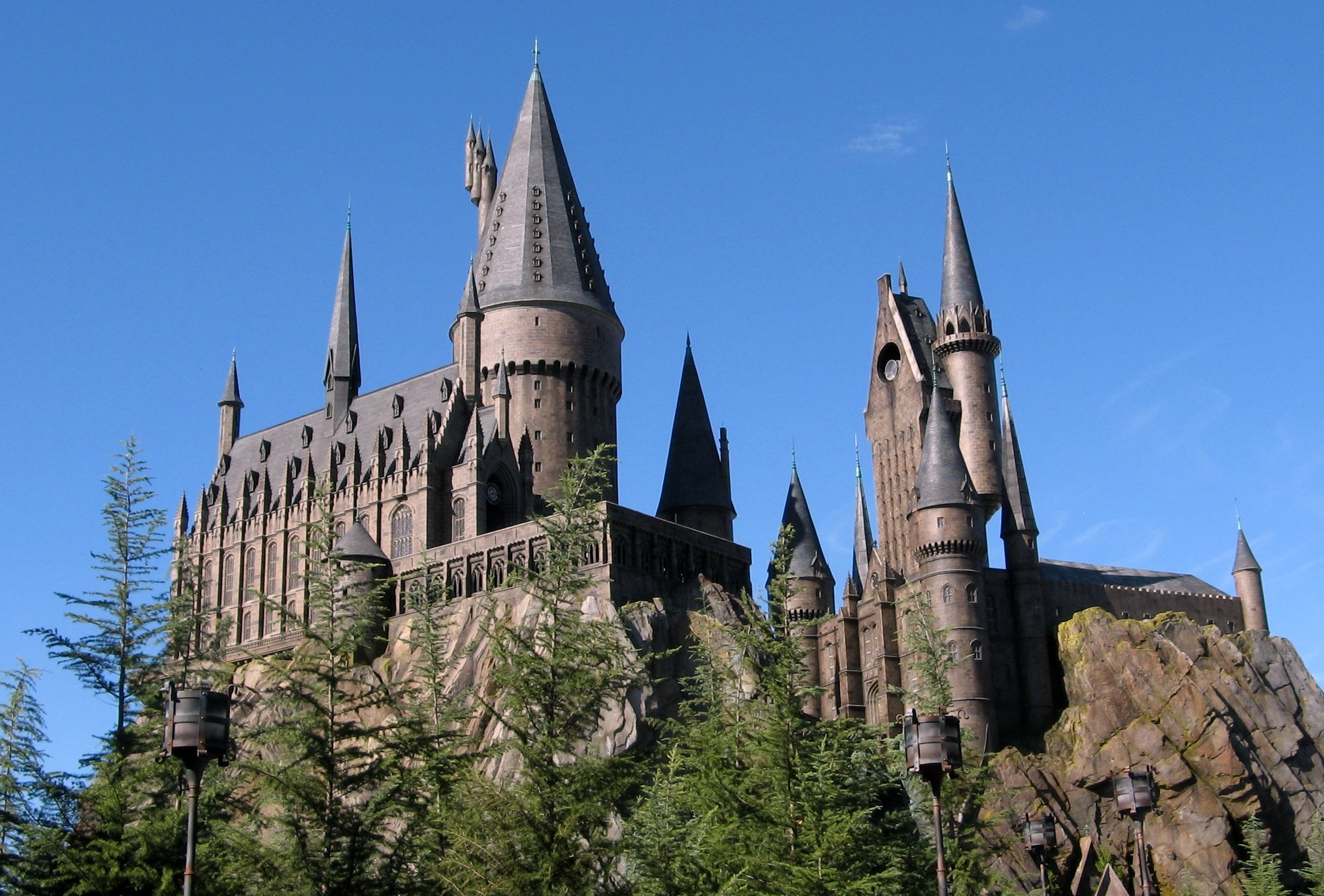
In the video game, Hogwarts Castle, pictured here at the Wizarding World of Harry Potter at Islands of Adventure, was recreated based on its description in the Harry Potter books to be faithful to the source material and easy to recognise.

Lead writer Moira Squier stated that the story in Hogwarts Legacy was intentionally set in a time period without established Wizarding World protagonists such as Harry Potter and Newt Scamander. This allows players to explore their own unique world within a setting reminiscent of the Harry Potter and Fantastic Beasts eras. While main Harry Potter characters do not appear, some familiar figures like Nearly Headless Nick and Peeves the Poltergeist make appearances. The writing team focused on creating a diverse range of characters that players could relate to and see themselves in. The team also introduced a character creator without gender options and the franchise's first transgender character, Sirona Ryan.

Boston Madsen, environmental lead for the creation of Hogwarts, emphasised the importance of creating environmental elements close to the source material from the Harry Potter books. Madsen noted that although it is Avalanche Software's version of Hogwarts, the castle remains easily recognisable. Game director Alan Tew added that they aimed to go beyond the expected areas, encouraging players to discover new locations and hidden chambers. Tew and Madsen further explained that each of the four Hogwarts house common rooms was designed to offer a unique experience, enhanced by distinct music for each house. Their goal was to create a welcoming atmosphere that fostered a sense of nostalgia and belonging.

Lead designer Troy Leavitt stated that the studio had the flexibility to select the elements that fans were most enthusiastic about. He added that Hogwarts Legacy was designed to give fans the wizarding world experience they always desired while reading the books or watching the movies, without promoting any particular agenda or message. Game designer Troy Johnson explained that advances in technology and gaming consoles made it possible to create a competent game based on the Wizarding World. The open world was designed to offer players overall freedom and to provide opportunities for crafting a highly personalised experience. Artists Jeff Bunker and Vanessa Palmer noted that they focused on five technical pillars: 4K graphics and visuals, 3D audio, activities and game assistance, the PlayStation 5 DualSense controller, and fast loading times. They referenced the use of Unreal Engine, especially its Niagara visual effects system, and the computing and rendering power of the PlayStation 5 to deliver the visual effects of spells and magic. Each spell was given its own visual language with unique casting, impact and area of effect, resulting in dozens of distinct magical effects.

=== Music ===
Chuck E. Myers, J. Scott Rakozy and Peter Murray composed the soundtrack, including additional tracks by Alexander Horowitz. Murray and Rakozy explained that the challenge of its creative process was to balance the original composition with the existing music of the Wizarding World films. One of the songs, "Overture to the Unwritten", was released ahead of the soundtrack. It was performed by the Seven Springs Symphony Orchestra & Choir and featured in a promotional music video.

In December 2022, the soundtrack's release was announced for February 2023. It was released as two digital double albums totalling 75 tracks: Hogwarts Legacy (Original Video Game Soundtrack) and Hogwarts Legacy (Study Themes from the Original Video Game Soundtrack). The soundtrack also saw a vinyl release, mastered by James Plotkin and distributed by Mondo. Music from the game was featured at the 2023 Hollywood Bowl concert in celebration of the ten-year anniversary of The Game Awards.

=== Release ===
Official reveal trailer

Before any formal announcement was made, gameplay footage was leaked in 2018. Hogwarts Legacy was announced at a PlayStation 5 event in September 2020, with a planned release for PlayStation 4, PlayStation 5, Windows, Xbox One, and Xbox Series X/S in 2021. It was delayed twice: first to 2022, and later to 10 February 2023. The PS4 and Xbox One versions were further delayed from February 2023 to 5 May 2023. The game was released in three versions: Standard, Deluxe, and Collector's Edition. The Deluxe Edition includes extra content like a mount, clothing set, and exclusive battle arena. The Collector's Edition includes the former's content along with a steel case, box, and a collectible "floating wand". Owners of the Standard Edition can upgrade to Deluxe by purchasing the extra content separately. Early access began on 7 February 2023 for those who pre-ordered the physical Collector's Edition or Digital Deluxe Edition. A limited edition DualSense controller, the "Revelio Controller", was released in the United States and United Kingdom to coincide with the launch. With the launch of the PlayStation 4 and Xbox One versions of Hogwarts Legacy, an arachnophobia mode was added. It replaces regular spiders with a cartoonish design that removes their legs and adds roller skates, referencing the Harry Potter books. Den of Geek considered the update a positive addition but would have preferred an option to remove spiders as enemies entirely. A Nintendo Switch port by Shiver Entertainment was released on 14 November 2023. It was originally scheduled for 25 July 2023. To accompany the release of PlayStation 5 Pro, Hogwarts Legacy received graphics enhancements to support the console's increased power. The Nintendo Switch 2 version was released alongside the console on 5 June 2025, featuring enhanced graphics and reduced loading times.

Hogwarts Legacy drew criticism for setting its story during the Goblin Rebellion era of Wizarding World history and assigning the protagonist to suppress a goblin uprising. Goblins in the Wizarding World have previously been criticised as based on antisemitic tropes. TheGamer argued that the game suggests that goblins, as a minority, are the villains for fighting against their oppressors and seeking equal rights and freedom. Some defended the portrayal of goblins in the game and the wider Harry Potter universe. The non-governmental organisation Campaign Against Antisemitism wrote that Harry Potter's depiction of goblins is consistent with their portrayal in Western literature, and is therefore "a testament more to centuries of Christendom's antisemitism than it is to malice by contemporary artists". They also commended Rowling for being a "tireless defender of the Jewish community". Travis Northup of IGN disagreed that the game contained antisemitic tropes, stating that the story does not feature a group of goblins controlling banks or trying to seize power. Instead, it focuses on a single goblin who rebels against the Wizarding World's refusal to grant his kind access to magic.

Hogwarts Legacy became a subject of contention in response to Rowling's controversial views on transgender people. Her critics called for a boycott to support the transgender community and to impede the financial benefits she would receive from its release. Others felt that Hogwarts Legacy could be separated from Rowling's views. Transgender YouTuber Jessie Earl stated that those on each side of the debate should come to their own conclusions and that, while it was not wrong to want to play Hogwarts Legacy, those who did should not claim to support the trans community. In response to the controversy, the studio added that the development focused on creating a "rich and diverse" world that would represent all groups of people. Warner Bros. Interactive Entertainment's president, David Haddad, said that Rowling has the right to hold her views. Shortly before release, a website was created with the purpose of identifying Twitch streamers who played the game. It was taken down shortly after the creator faced criticism. Some streamers decided not to stream the game, with Polygon noting that this occurred either in favour of ongoing protests or for fear of harassment. As a result of the controversy surrounding Rowling, some publications chose not to cover or review Hogwarts Legacy, and the internet forum ResetEra banned all discussion of it. Wired gave it the lowest possible score, describing the story and gameplay as mediocre and harmful. The game's viewership on Twitch peaked at a record-breaking 1.28 million concurrent viewers on 7 February. The boycott was declared unsuccessful by some publications. Den of Geek and PC Games stated that the issues with Rowling seemed to have had minimal effect on sales.

=== Additional content ===
At release, players could obtain free cosmetic items by joining the Harry Potter Fan Club and linking a WB Games account. PlayStation versions included exclusive content like the "Haunted Hogsmeade Shop" quest and the "Felix Felicis" potion recipe as a pre-order bonus. The quest features an additional dungeon, a cosmetic set, and an in-game shop, while the potion reveals gear chests on the map. The Dark Arts Pack, available in Deluxe and Collector's editions or as downloadable content (DLC), includes an exclusive mount, clothing set, and a new battle arena. From the early access release on 7 February 2023 to 24 February 2023, players could earn five exclusive cosmetic items by watching selected Hogwarts Legacy livestreams on Twitch. The items were distributed via Twitch Drops, (Note: Twitch Drops are in-game rewards earned by viewers for watching Twitch streams which have Drops enabled. Earned Drops appear in the Twitch Drops Inventory and, once claimed, are delivered to the viewer's linked game account or in-game inventory.) which were granted after viewers watched streams for a specified time. The launch of the PlayStation 4 and Xbox One versions offered the "Professor Ronen cosmetic set", with seven extra items obtainable through Twitch Drops.

Shortly after release, game director Alan Tew stated that the team focused only on the launch and did not yet plan to release additional content. In May 2024, Avalanche Studios announced a major update for 6 June, which added player-requested features like a photo mode, talent point resets, and new cosmetic items. The update also made pre-order and previously console-exclusive content available on all platforms, including the "Haunted Hogsmeade Shop" quest. In January 2025, PC-exclusive mod support was added via the Hogwarts Legacy Creator Kit. In March 2025, Bloomberg's Jason Schreier reported that Warner Bros. cancelled an unannounced story expansion that had been planned for release later in the year, alongside a Definitive Edition containing all previously released content. According to Schreier, the cancellation was in part because the company felt that the content was not substantial enough to justify the anticipated price.

== Reception ==
=== Critical response ===
Reception

Aggregate scores
Aggregator	Score
Metacritic	(PC) 83/100 (Note: Based on 22 reviews) (PS5) 84/100 (Note: Based on 96 scored reviews of 102 total reviews) (XSXS) 85/100 (Note: Based on 21 scored reviews of 22 total reviews) (NS2) 82/100 (Note: Based on 16 reviews)
OpenCritic	88% (Note: Based on 175 reviews)

Review scores
Publication	Score
4Players	80/100
Destructoid	7/10
Digital Trends	2.5/5
Famitsu	37/40
Game Informer	9/10
GameRevolution	6/10
GameSpot	6/10
GamesRadar+	3.5/5
IGN	9/10
NME	3/5
PC Gamer (US)	83/100
PCGamesN	7/10
Push Square	8/10
The Guardian	3/5
Video Games Chronicle	4/5

Hogwarts Legacy received "generally favourable" reviews, according to review aggregator Metacritic. (Note: Attributed to multiple references:) Fellow review aggregator OpenCritic assessed that the game received "mighty" approval, being recommended by 88% of critics. In Japan, four critics from Famitsu gave it a total score of 37 out of 40.

Many critics praised the environments, visuals and overall faithfulness to the source material. (Note: Attributed to multiple references:) GamesRadar+ complimented the world as being faithful to existing Wizarding World lore, while Destructoid appreciated the overall presentation and positive synergy with the universe. Other reviewers echoed these points, (Note: Attributed to multiple references:) with NME writing that the world was probably the most fitting depiction for fans. Further praise was directed at the castle's level of detail. Push Square highlighted the level of atmosphere and visual presentation, finding it made aimless activities like walking around Hogwarts enjoyable. The surrounding areas set in the Scottish Highlands received similar praise.

The gameplay received mixed reactions, with praise for the variety of content (Note: Attributed to multiple references:) but criticism regarding the open-world experience. (Note: Attributed to multiple references:) PC Gamer praised the straightforward yet cohesive systems, such as the wizard duels and the personalised Room of Requirement. Eurogamer Germany said the attention to detail motivated players to explore the world. They highlighted the music and were impressed by the design of some of the quests and puzzles. Destructoid complimented the range of activities and unlockables but found the game sometimes unimpressive, contributing to a less than satisfactory open-world environment. NME similarly wrote that the design felt dated, which they attributed to its long development cycle. The Guardian criticised the experience as competent yet not particularly impressive. While praising the presentation for its captivating nature, they felt that the progression was derivative of other open-world examples. GameRevolution described Hogwarts Legacy as a fun but forgettable Harry Potter fan service. While they found exploring the world enjoyable, they wrote that features such as attending classes and creating potions lacked sufficient depth and lamented the absence of Quidditch.

Combat was generally praised, (Note: Attributed to multiple references:) though critics were divided on the enemy design. PCGamesN considered it as the strongest aspect, highlighting its fluid mechanics, varied enemies, and strategic use of colour-coded spells despite the restriction of equipping only four at a time. The A.V. Club deemed it the most interesting feature and expressed that confrontations with greater difficulty provided genuinely thrilling experiences. GameSpot described the combat and spells as giving a notable feeling of control to players, though they criticised the spell-selecting controls and the unremarkable enemy design. Game Informer similarly complimented the general combat experience but lamented the enemies for lacking variety.

The narrative divided critics. Some praised the developer's handling of the narrative to tell an original story in a setting that felt overly familiar. Windows Central deemed the story compelling. Video Games Chronicle positively highlighted the writing of the more detailed side quests as some of the best of the series. Hardcore Gamer praised the story as riveting, but felt it faltered towards the end. PCMag in particular criticised the decision to have the protagonist act out a "Chosen One" role. Other reviewers found the narrative to be lacklustre and illogical at times.

The characters were mostly well received. (Note: Attributed to multiple references:) Windows Central described them as interesting and noted that they added depth to the world. PCMag praised the voice acting for making conversations feel authentic and commended the ethnic diversity of the characters. Game Informer similarly praised the voice acting and additionally highlighted the dialogue, describing both as uniformly excellent. IGN praised the companions for their characterisation and roles. On the other hand, Video Games Chronicle considered certain NPCs beyond Hogwarts to be lifeless. Hardcore Gamer wrote that the protagonist's rivals, Ranrok and Rookwood, failed as compelling antagonists and were inferior compared to other established Harry Potter villains. PinkNews reported that transgender character Sirona Ryan's inclusion was largely dismissed as insincere by the transgender community and their allies.

Reviewers were critical of Legacy's technical aspects at release. (Note: Attributed to multiple references:) PC Gamer experienced brief but frequent pauses at doors and frame rate drops during uneventful moments. Eurogamer Germany noted shading issues and rigid facial expressions on character models. Many noted that the performance was affected by technical problems, including slow loading of textures, frame rate inconsistencies, visual glitches, clipping objects, and inconsistent lighting. (Note: Attributed to multiple references:) GameStar reported performance problems overall while reviewing the PC version, especially in areas with many NPCs, but said the first patch alleviated some of these problems.

=== Sales ===
On 23 February 2023, Warner Bros. Discovery announced that Hogwarts Legacy had sold more than 12 million copies and generated $850 million in global revenue. By 5 May 2023, global sales had risen to 15 million copies, surpassing $1 billion in total earnings. The game reached 22 million units sold by the end of 2023, including approximately 2 million during the December holiday season. Sales rose to 30 million copies in October 2024 and reached 34 million copies sold by the end of March 2025. As of December 2025, Hogwarts Legacy sold 40 million copies, making it one of the best-selling video games.

In the United States, Hogwarts Legacy topped the monthly sales charts for February 2023. In the United Kingdom, it debuted and remained atop of the physical sales chart for five consecutive weeks, and fifteen weeks in total. Analysts compared its first-week sales with Elden Ring, noting increases of 80% in physical sales and 88% in digital sales. In Germany, it sold more than 600,000 copies in two and a half weeks. Across Europe, its launch was the sixth-largest for a video game since the inception of the European Monthly Charts. In Japan, Hogwarts Legacy debuted atop the software sales chart with the PlayStation 5 version selling 67,196 physical copies. It held the top spot for an additional week and had sold a total of 172,820 physical copies by 14 May 2023. The PlayStation 4 version sold 44,947 physical copies by 4 June 2023. As of 4 February 2024, the Nintendo Switch version reached 95,156 physical copies sold. On Steam, Hogwarts Legacy peaked at over 489,000 concurrent players during early access. It marked the second-highest concurrent player count for a single-player game at the time, behind only Cyberpunk 2077, which reached over 1 million concurrent players. The game later peaked at more than 879,000 concurrent players, making it the game with the eighth-highest concurrent player peak overall at the time. Steam separates pre-orders and official releases for reporting purposes, which meant Hogwarts Legacy occupied the top four spots on the platform's sales chart at some point during its first week of release.

Hogwarts Legacy was the best-selling game of 2023 in the United States, breaking a 14-year games industry streak of either a Call of Duty or a Rockstar Games release holding the top spot. It was also the eleventh best-selling game in the US in 2024. In Europe, it was the second best-selling game of 2023. Excluding EA's football game, no other game had achieved comparable unit sales in a calendar year since the launch of the European charts in 2017. The game topped the annual sales charts of 2023 in the Czech Republic, the Netherlands, and the United Kingdom, and reached the top three in Belgium, Denmark, Finland, Hungary, Italy, Norway, Poland, Portugal, Slovakia, and Sweden. On Steam, it was among the best-performing games of 2023.

=== Accolades ===
Before its release, Hogwarts Legacy was nominated for "Most Anticipated Game" at the Game Awards 2022 and "Most Wanted Game" at the Golden Joystick Awards 2022. Several publications listed it as one of the most anticipated games of 2023, including CNN, GameSpot, IGN, NPR, Polygon, Time, and VentureBeat. As a result of its record-breaking viewership on Twitch during early access, Hogwarts Legacy became the most-watched single-player game by peak viewers on the platform and earned a Guinness World Record.

At the 20th British Academy Games Awards, Hogwarts Legacy was longlisted in nine categories, and was ultimately nominated for the British Academy Games Award for Animation and British Academy Games Award for Family. It was nominated for "Game of the Year" and won "Best Game on Steam Deck" at The Steam Awards. At France's 2024 Pégases awards, Legacy was nominated for "Best Foreign Video Game". At Poland's 2024 Digital Dragons Awards, it was similarly nominated for "Best Foreign Game". Eurogamer Germany awarded Hogwarts Legacy as "Best Fanservice" in its 2023 awards. At the PS Blog Game of the Year Awards 2023, it was nominated in seven categories. It won "PS4 Game of the Year" and placed as runner-up in the categories "Best Use of DualSense" (Gold Trophy) and "Best Audio Design" (Silver Trophy). Hardcore Gamer nominated Hogwarts Legacy for "Best Action Game", while IGN named it a runner-up for "Best Open-World Game". It appeared on several year-end lists of 2023, including Gamepressure, Der Spiegel, BBC, The Telegraph and the longlist for the 2024 BAFTA Games Awards.

Awards and nominations for Hogwarts Legacy
Award	Date	Category	Result	Ref.
Golden Joystick Awards 2022	22 November 2022	Most Wanted Award	Nominated	
The Game Awards 2022	8 December 2022	Most Anticipated Game	Nominated	
23rd Golden Trailer Awards	29 June 2023	Best Video Game Trailer	Won	
Japan Game Awards 2023	21 September 2023	Award for Excellence	Won	
The Steam Awards 2023	2 January 2024	Game of the Year	Nominated	
The Steam Awards 2023	2 January 2024	Best Game on Steam Deck	Won	
66th Grammy Awards	4 February 2024	Best Score Soundtrack for Video Games and Other Interactive Media	Nominated	
27th D.I.C.E. Awards	15 February 2024	Outstanding Achievement in Art Direction	Nominated	
27th D.I.C.E. Awards	15 February 2024	Outstanding Technical Achievement	Nominated	
51st Annie Awards	17 February 2024	Outstanding Achievement for Character Animation in a Video Game	Nominated	
24th Game Developers Choice Awards	20 March 2024	Best Audio	Honorable mention	
20th British Academy Games Awards	11 April 2024	Animation	Nominated	
20th British Academy Games Awards	11 April 2024	Family	Nominated	
20th British Academy Games Awards	11 April 2024	Artistic Achievement	Longlisted	
20th British Academy Games Awards	11 April 2024	Audio Achievement	Longlisted	
20th British Academy Games Awards	11 April 2024	Best Game	Longlisted	
20th British Academy Games Awards	11 April 2024	Game Design	Longlisted	
20th British Academy Games Awards	11 April 2024	Music	Longlisted	
20th British Academy Games Awards	11 April 2024	Narrative	Longlisted	
20th British Academy Games Awards	11 April 2024	Technical Achievement	Longlisted	
BMI Film & TV Awards	5 June 2024	BMI Video Games Award	Won	

== Influence and future ==
In its release month, Hogwarts Legacy became the most successful game in the Wizarding World franchise. The franchise also experienced a boost in engagement, with a 300% increase in traffic on Wizarding World websites. The popularity of Hogwarts Legacy influenced Warner Bros. Discovery's strategy for the wider franchise. In August 2024, Warner Bros. stated it would plan to develop further Wizarding World games, such as Harry Potter: Quidditch Champions.

In September 2024, Warner Bros. Discovery's Gunnar Wiedenfels stated that a sequel to Hogwarts Legacy would be one of the corporation's primary goals. The sequel is planned to be connected to the upcoming Harry Potter television series.

== See also ==
- Best-selling video games in the United States by year
- Harry Potter video games – Licensed video games based on the Harry Potter novels
- List of best-selling video games
- List of highest-grossing media franchises
