= AVP: Evolution =

2013 video game

- Developer: Angry Mob Games
- Publisher: Fox Digital Entertainment
- Platforms: iOS, Android, Ouya
- Release: iOS, Android; February 28, 2013; Ouya; September 26, 2013
- Genre: Third-person shooter
- Mode: Single-player

AVP: Evolution (full title: Alien vs. Predator: Evolution) is a third-person shooter tie-in to the Alien vs. Predator franchise, developed by Angry Mob Games and published by Fox Digital Entertainment for iOS, Android, and Ouya in 2013. It was later discontinued due to poor sales.

== Reception ==
Reception

Aggregate score
Aggregator	Score
Metacritic	59/100

Review scores
Publication	Score
Destructoid	2/10
Gamezebo	60/100
GameZone	(favorable)
MacLife	2.5/5
Macworld	2.5/5
Pocket Gamer	1.5/5
Digital Spy	2/5

The iOS version received "mixed or average" reviews according to the review aggregation website Metacritic.

== See also ==
- List of Alien, Predator, and Alien vs. Predator games
