= Marvel Strike Force =

2018 video game

- Loading screen for Marvel Strike Force (Ant-Man and the Wasp update)
- Developers: FoxNext (2018-2020); Scopely (2020-present)
- Publishers: FoxNext (2018-2020); Scopely (2020-present)
- Engine: Unity
- Platforms: Android, iOS
- Release: March 28, 2018
- Genre: Role-playing
- Modes: Single-player, multiplayer

Marvel Strike Force is a turn-based role-playing mobile game by FoxNext (later acquired by Scopely) for Android, iOS, and iPadOS platforms. The game was launched worldwide on March 28, 2018, and is primarily set in the Marvel Universe.

== Premise ==
The Earth has fallen under siege by sinister forces led by Ultimus. Agents of S.T.R.I.K.E. (Special Tactical Reserve for Interdimensional Key Events) have been called to assemble squads of heroes and villains to combat Ultimus' legions, that includes mind-controlled versions of the heroes and villains from alternate universes, before Earth falls under Ultimus' control.

In addition to this main storyline, special sub-plot events are also released, loosely based on recent Marvel Cinematic Universe films that have been released, starting with Avengers: Infinity War.

== Gameplay ==
Marvel Strike Force allows players to collect Marvel Universe characters from both the heroes and villains and generic characters from large organizations such as S.H.I.E.L.D., the Hand, and Hydra, and use them to fight in turn-based battles. Similar to the fighting game Marvel: Contest of Champions, characters fall into one of several classes. There are multiple ways to collect characters: some are given to players immediately, whereas others are gained via gameplay or as in-game rewards in the form of shards that are earned by players to unlock and or promote their characters. Shards can either be earned from winning battles or bought from a shop. Players level up their user level by gaining experience, which is earned through daily quests and battles.

Battles are divided up into rounds, with the character with the highest speed attribute going first. Each team consists of up to five characters (though some AI teams in raids can have more characters) who battle until defeated or reinforcements enter. Battles are turn-based, based on the speed attribute, where the combatants apply healing and various buffs to their own team and damage and debuffs to the opponent.

Players may join alliances that form the main group inside of the game, which can include up to 24 players and be private or open. Alliances allow players to play in raids and wars and to access alliance milestones. These alliances can be created by any player or created by the game. All players must be in an alliance, so if a player leaves or is kicked from an alliance, the game will assign a new one.

Characters usually appear in their attire from the existing comics; a costume currency is available for purchasing attire for certain characters based on their Marvel Cinematic Universe appearances, old comic appearances or other notable media appearances. The attire sets have no bearing on the characters' moves, they are purely cosmetic.

== Modes ==
The main game modes are Arena, Blitz, Raids, Alliance War, Real Time Arena, Cosmic Crucible, Alliance War, Campaign, Challenges, Dark Dimension, Scourges, and Sagas. The first four of those have their own currencies that can be spent on character shards or items. All modes are played versus a computer-controlled AI, except Real Time Arena, where the combatants are other players. This includes the Arena, Blitz, Cosmic Crucible, and Alliance War battles, in which the AI controls a player-created team.

- Campaigns are story modes with pre-match dialogues. They are divided into Worlds and these Worlds are divided into Stages. Each Stage features playable squads composed of characters selected by the players (up to 5), characters assigned by the story mode, or a combination of both. The AI sets the opponents for each Stage, generally in three ways:
  - Defeat all enemies in the opposing side to win.
  - Defeat specific enemies to win the match or prevent the deployment of machinery.
  - Player's operator(s) must survive to accomplish a goal, such as deploying machinery.

All the player's selected characters must survive in order to earn all three stars available for the Stage, which will enable Auto-Win for that Stage, which allows the player to earn resources for that Stage without going through a full battle. Enemy squad members generally have glowing red eyes, indicating their control by Ultimus.

- Arena pits player-created squads against other player-created squads in 5-on-5 battles while competing for daily prizes based on ranking at the end of the daily reset time.
- Blitz works the same way as the Arena but the opposing squads are generally of lower levels, giving a higher handicap advantage to the player. Unlike the Arena, which sets a time gap before another match can take place, Blitz allows immediate subsequent matches. If the same characters are used, Blitz energy units are consumed, five per character.
- Raids are a series of maps that a player-ran alliance of up to 24 people must work together to defeat all of the nodes.
- Challenges are completed once a day to allow players to accumulate various resources. Each challenge occurs three days per week and can be completed three times per day. Challenge requires specific character traits to be used to complete each tier of the challenge.
- Alliance War is working together within a player's alliance to defeat an opponent's helicarrier with 12 rooms each with two sets of 10 defense teams while defending with the player's own helicarrier.
- Real Time Arena is a one versus one battle between two players played in real-time.
- Scourges are the way to unlock legendary characters, and happen regularly on a rotation basis. The player can add modifiers to the nodes to change the gameplay for extra milestone points.
- S.W.O.R.D. satellite is a tower mode where players climb to unlock greater rewards.

== Reception ==
=== Critical ===
Game Informer criticised the expensive content and numerous bugs, concluding that it "feels designed to frustrate players until they finally cave and spend."

=== Revenue ===
Marvel Strike Force generated $150 million in sales during its first year of operation (2018) on the iOS and Android platforms. Growth continued modestly to $180+ million in sales in 2019, in 2020 with approximately $300 million in revenue.

=== Awards ===
The game was nominated for "Mobile Game of the Year" at the SXSW Gaming Awards, and won the People's Voice Award for "Games" in the "Video" category of the 2019 Webby Awards, whereas its other nomination was for "Strategy/Simulation Game" under the "Games" category. Google Play awarded it as the best breakthrough game of 2019, which is for overall design, user experience, engagement and retention, and strong growth. The game was also nominated for "Best Live Ops" at the Pocket Gamer Mobile Games Awards, and for "Strategy/Simulation" at the 2020 Webby Awards.
