= Jordi Cervelló =

Catalan composer (1935–2022)

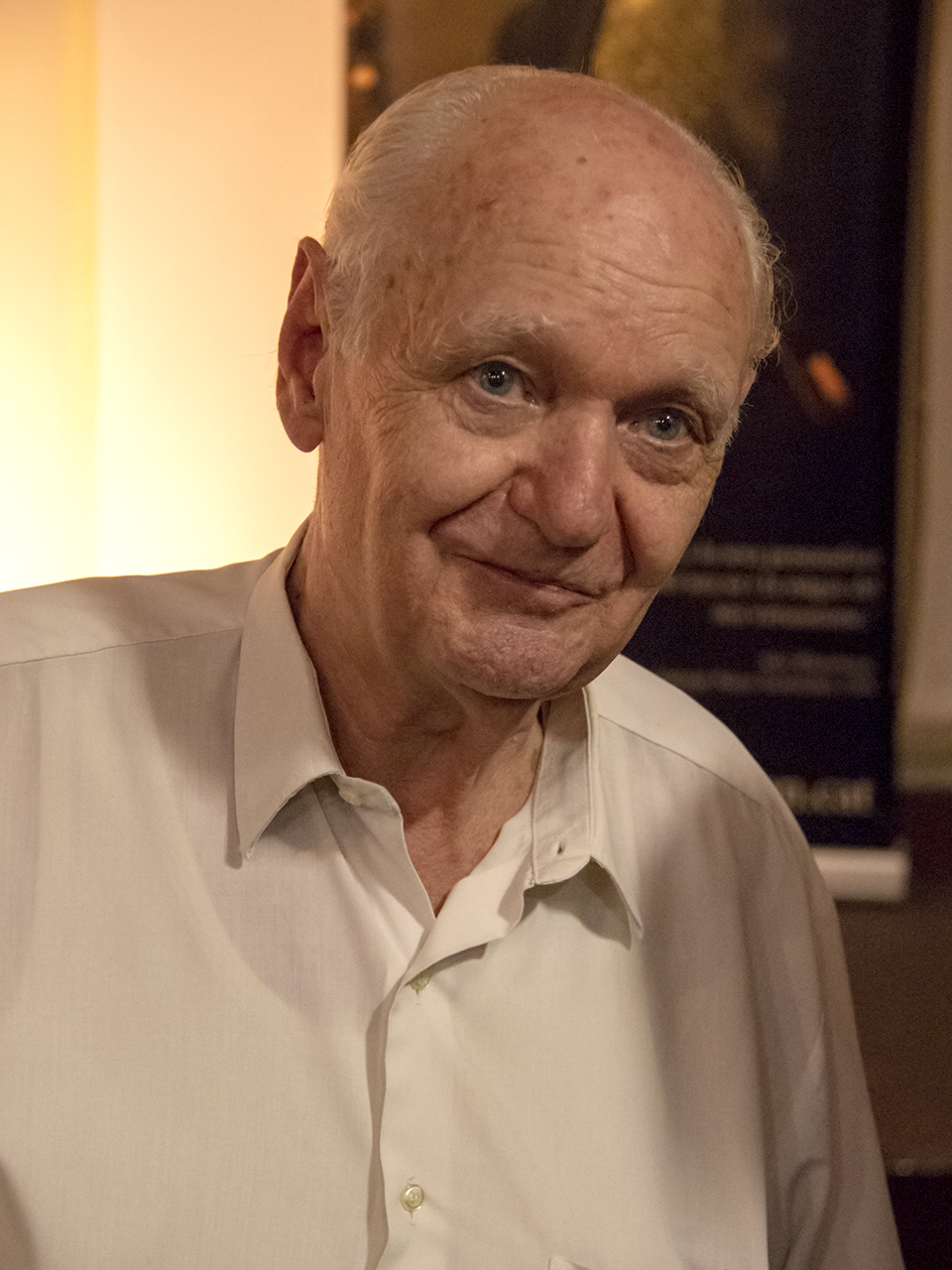
Cervelló in 2018

Jordi Cervelló i Garriga (18 October 1935 – 2 September 2022) was a Catalan composer.

Cervelló was born in Barcelona on 18 October 1935. He studied violin with Joan Massià and composition with Josep M. Roma. Later he went to Rome, Milan, Siena and Salzburg. He has done important work as a professor at Badalona Conservatory from 1982 to 1996 and as author of the Treatise on the Fundamental Principles of Violin Technique. He was a critic at El País newspaper. In 2006 he received the Cross of St. George and in 2010 the National Music Prize from the Catalan Government. He died from pneumonia on 2 September 2022, at the age of 86.

The personal papers of Jordi Cervelló are preserved in the Biblioteca de Catalunya.

== Bibliography ==
- Francesc Taverna-Bech and Álvaro García Estefanía, Jordi Cervelló, Sociedad General de Autores de España, Madrid, 1994.
