= Marvel Avengers Academy =

2016 video game

- Developer: TinyCo
- Publisher: TinyCo
- Platforms: iOS; Android; Amazon
- Release: February 4, 2016
- Genre: City Building
- Mode: Single-player

Marvel Avengers Academy was a freemium mobile game for iOS and Android, based on the characters featured in Marvel Comics. It was released on February 4, 2016. The game was shut down three years later. Despite the name, the game was not related to the comic series Avengers Academy.

== Gameplay ==
Marvel Avengers Academy tasked the player with building their own academic campus and populating it with superheroes who have been reimagined as students who are developing their superpowers. The game presented the player with a portion of the campus, with more areas being unlocked as they progressed through the game. Characters wandered through the map with more characters able to be recruited by the completion of missions. Others could only be recruited via the use of Infinity Gems. Infinity Gems were a premium currency that were rare in day-to-day gameplay, but could be bought via microtransactions. The other type of currency generated in the game was coins, gathered by the completion of quests. Completing missions, quests, unlocking characters and building up the campus allowed the player to accrue XP, allowing them to level up. Doing so enabled the player to unlock further buildings and characters, as well as improving their existing characters and buildings.

Periodically, themed events were released which occasionally tied in with releases in the Marvel Cinematic Universe. Themed events typically involved an enemy faction decamping upon the Academy with the aim of taking over. The player had to defend the Academy while also recruiting new characters to help save the Academy.

To coincide with the game's 2nd anniversary, a new update was released which fundamentally changed the gameplay. Instead of collecting coins from missions, the player now collected stamina, which was used to battle adversaries on a range of permanent battle maps. In addition to characters being leveled up, they could now also be ranked up which permanently raises their HP and combat battle stats.

The game was shut down on February 4, 2019.

== Reception ==
Marvel Avengers Academy received mixed reviews on launch. Polygon stated that the game was "more fun than it has any right to be", while also praising the character design and story lines. Pocket Gamer was more critical, rating the game at 4/10 and stating that Avengers Academy was "free to play at its very worst". While they also praised the character design, they said the game was geared heavily toward players who will pay in order to progress.

Luke Brown of ComicsAlliance praised the game's "strong design and story work", but noted some minor frustrations such as limited activities and lack of rewards for characters that weren't tied to a mission.
