= Family Guy: The Quest for Stuff =

2014 video game based on Family Guy series

- Launch screen
- Developer: TinyCo
- Publisher: Jam City
- Producer: Imanol Martinez
- Composer: Walter Murphy
- Platforms: Android; Kindle Fire iOS; Windows Phone 8 Windows 8.1; Adobe Flash
- Release: April 10, 2014
- Genre: City-building game
- Modes: Single-player multiplayer

Family Guy: The Quest for Stuff is a city-building video game based on the American animated sitcom series Family Guy. It was released by Fox Digital Entertainment, Jam City and developer TinyCo for Kindle, iOS, Android, Windows Phone 8 and Windows 8.1. It allows users to create and run their own version of Quahog using familiar characters and buildings.

It features an original story conceived by the show's writers in which Quahog has been destroyed and it is up to the player to bring it back to its former glory. Some of the series' main actors, like Seth MacFarlane (Peter, Stewie, Brian, Quagmire, Dr. Hartman, Carter Pewterschmidt, etc.), Alex Borstein (Lois), Mila Kunis (Meg), and Seth Green (Chris) collaborated with TinyCo for the project.

== Story ==
Family Guy is cancelled again and Fox assembles citizens of Quahog to explain why. It is revealed that Ernie the Giant Chicken is responsible and Peter challenges him to a fight. The ensuing brawl quickly results in mass destruction of Quahog. As the game play begins, it is up to the player to help Peter restore Quahog and reunite him with his friends and family.

== Gameplay ==
Players guide the cast of Family Guy in rebuilding the town of Quahog. The game includes quests for the player to complete, such as helping Peter become a pirate, helping Glenn Quagmire find Gold Digger Island, and helping Mayor Adam West survive the town's running of the bulls. Players may purchase optional digital goods to speed up, decorate, or differentiate gameplay. As players continue, their personalized Quahog grows with additional characters, places, and situations from the Family Guy universe. The game also features FaceSpace, an in-game Facebook-like social network where the game's characters can interact and post new level achievements. Players can also visit their friends' personalized Quahogs.

== Production ==
The game was developed by TinyCo and published by Fox Digital Entertainment and was released in the iOS App Store and Google Play store in most countries on April 10, 2014. The game was written by the Family Guy show writers. The voices were provided by the show's voice actors. The character pages for the game's FaceSpace were all created specifically for the game with new original content related to the game's quests.

== Updates ==
On May 31, 2014, an update was released, entitled "Kingdom of the Full Moon", an Indiana Jones-styled adventure that shows the addition of a museum themed on Ancient Egypt and involves collecting "moon idols" in order to find Cleveland Brown. The update was released less than three weeks after Cleveland's official return to the series following the cancellation of The Cleveland Show.

On July 24, 2014, a San Diego Comic-Con style update was released on iOS and was released on Android on July 31, 2014. It added a comic-con style building, new characters, costumes, and more. Guest playable celebrities include: George Takei, Stan Lee, Patrick Stewart, Ron Perlman, Felicia Day, Nathan Fillion and Bryan Cranston.

From September 26–29, 2014, a minor update was released that gave players a limited opportunity to win the Kool-Aid Man as a playable character.

On October 1, 2014, the game had its first Ghostbusters-style Halloween update. The update added Ghostbuster-styled outfits for Peter, Quagmire, Joe, and Cleveland, new haunted buildings, etc. The update also included deceased characters Diane Simmons, Francis Griffin, and Mr. Weed, as well as playable characters from classic horror films, including: Alien from Alien, Predator from Predator, Jason Voorhees from Friday the 13th, and Freddy Krueger from A Nightmare on Elm Street.

On November 7, 2014, the game had a Quahog Clam Festival update. The update had Carl showing clips from American Dad! to earn free clams to the player's game. Plus, Stan Smith, Francine Smith, Steve Smith, Hayley Smith, and Roger from American Dad! became playable characters during the event. During the event, the update gave a nuke button in the inventory. Land would be destroyed, yet decorations and buildings would be saved in the inventory.

On December 5, 2014, the game had its Christmas update. The update let the player create gifts and send decorations and buildings to friends through its Facebook feature. Alternate skins included Sexy Santa Lois, Hanukkah Mort, Jingle Joe, Puppy Brian, and Angel Bruce, and new characters included Jasper, Jesus Christ, Santa Claus, Barbara Pewterschmidt, John McClane from Die Hard, and Gene Simmons and Paul Stanley of Kiss.

On January 1, 2015, the game had its New Year's update. The update had buildings and decorations based on the Times Square New Year's Eve party. New outfits included New Year's Brian, New Year's Jillian and new characters included Jillian Russell-Wilcox.

On January 28, 2015, there was a Best of 2014 event which brought back the best characters, costumes, decorations and buildings from 2014. Including King Butt, George Takei, Nathan Fillon, Stan Lee, Mr. Weed, Diane Simmons and multiple other costumes.

On February 5, 2015, the game's Valentine's Day update had been released. New outfits included Multiverse Meg, Beautiful Peter, and Glenda Vajmire. New characters include Ida Davis, Cupid, Arnold Schwarzenegger, Cheryl Tiegs and Benedict Cumberbatch.

On March 19, 2015, a Star Trek-themed event was released. This update included an expansion to an alternate map aboard the Starship Enterprise, and new characters included numerous members of its cast: William Riker, Geordi La Forge, Deanna Troi, Worf, Guinan, Locutus, Beverly Crusher, Q, Data, James T. Kirk, Spock, Khan, Scotty, Uhura and Seven of Nine. New outfits included Starfleet Peter, Starfleet Lois, Ferengi Mort, Klingon Chris, Klingon Meg, Edo Herbert, Vulcan Quagmire, Talosian Stewie, Jean-Luc Picard (reverting Locutus to his human identity), Borg Consuela and Captain Pike Joe.

On May 15, 2015, a firefighter-themed event was released. New outfits included Sexy Firefighter Chris, Firefighter Seamus, and Fire Dog Brian.

On June 5, 2015, a Godfather-themed event entitled "The Fatfather" was released. New characters included Diabeto (who was a NPC in the Halloween 2014 event), Cleveland Jr., Mr. Washee Washee, The Judge, Detective Scrotes, Don Corleone, Mike Tyson, Mr. Miyagi, and RoboCop. New outfits included The Fatfather (Peter), Fight Promoter Cleveland, Gangster School Girl Tricia, Burnt Out Brian, Mob Wife Lois, Mob Wife Bonnie, Kingpin Consuela and Zoot Suit Stewie.

On July 10, 2015, a short Magic Mike-themed event was released, featuring the titular character as a new playable character. This event also included two new outfits, Magic Peter and Stripper Jerome, as well as Steroid Stewie and Stripper Bonnie, who were available in previous events.

On July 20, 2015, a mini event entitled "Invasion of the Hybrid Babies", based on the Season 13 episode "Stewie Is Enceinte", was released. New characters included Chip Griffin, and two of the hybrid babies, Finn and Jack. It also included one new outfit, Teen Mom Stewie.

On July 30, 2015, a week-long "Evil"-themed event was released. New characters included Retep and Evil Stewie (evil twins of Peter and Stewie, respectively), and Satan.

On August 8, 2015, a short 2-day themed event was released called Halloween Weekend. This event brought back items and costumes from Halloween 2014 (vampire Stewie, and Pink Brian). New costumes for Meg and Connie were released for a limited time along with new buildings.

On August 10, 2015, a month-long event called "Peter Palooza" was released. This featured a music festival and guest appearances from numerous famous musicians, and someone called Carl.

In 2016, Star Trek: 2nd Contact launched and concluded on February 25, 2016. Return of Star Trek: TNG cast and Scotty now added.

== Reception ==
Reviews

Aggregate scores
Aggregator	Score
GameRankings	50% (iOS)
Metacritic	47/100 (iOS)

Review scores
Publication	Score
Electronic Gaming Monthly	6.5/10
GameRevolution	4.5/5
Slide to Play	7.5/10

Family Guy: The Quest for Stuff received generally mixed reviews from critics. Many praised its similarities to the look and video dialogue of the Family Guy show, but complained that it requires too much time to complete quests, digital goods are too expensive, and the text dialogue gets repetitive. Some also pointed out the similarities between the game and The Simpsons: Tapped Out with Electronic Gaming Monthly noting, "Right from the get-go, you can tell that Family Guy: The Quest for Stuff is a carbon copy of The Simpsons: Tapped Out." The game's screen design has been used as a model for the fictional Terrance & Phillip freemium game criticized in South Park's episode "Freemium Isn't Free".

The game generated over $100 million in revenue by October 2016.

== See also ==
- List of Family Guy video games
