= Blanche Selva =

French pianist, music educator, writer and composer

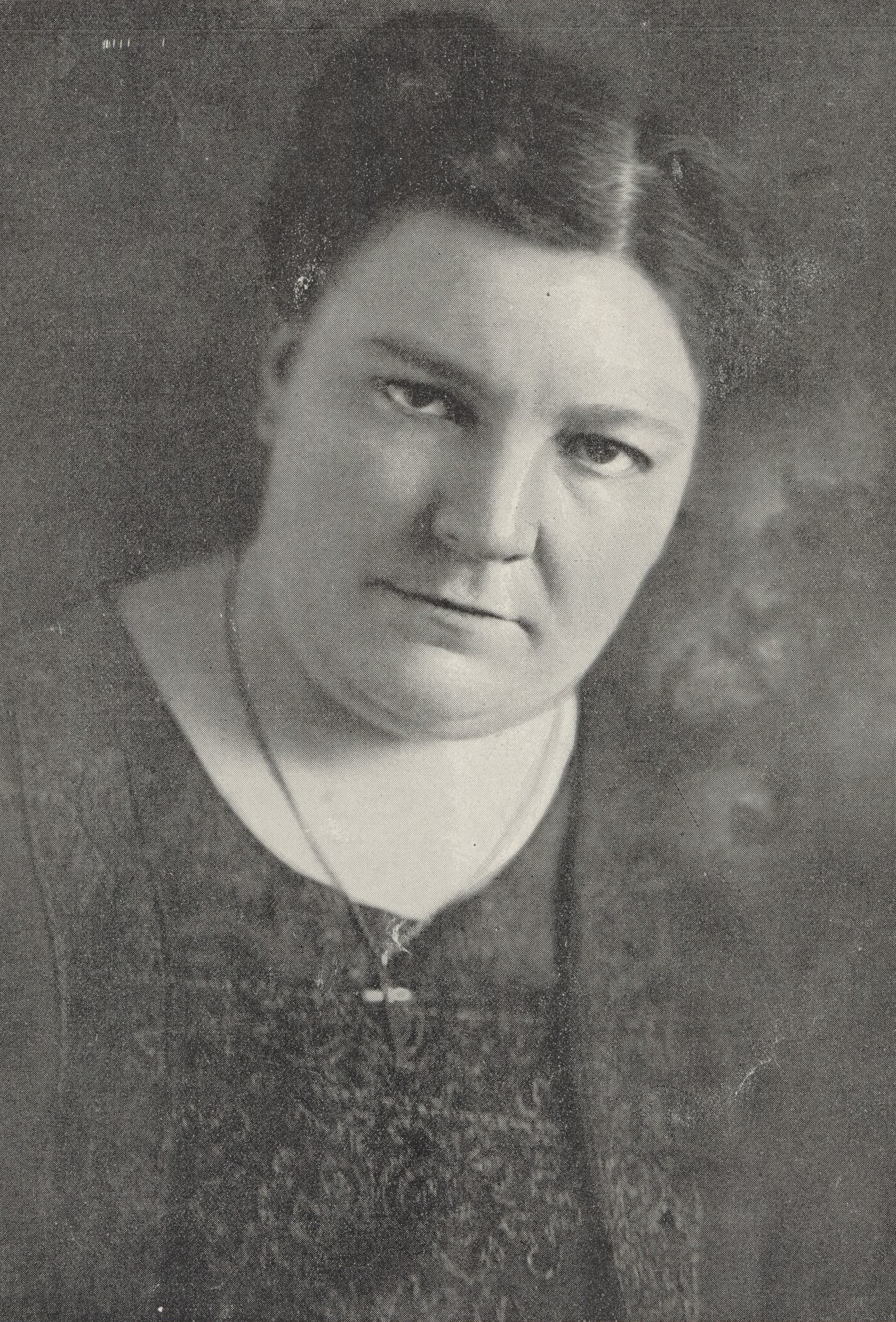
Blanche Selva

Marie Blanche Selva (Catalan Blanca Selva i Henry, 29 January 1884 – 3 December 1942) was a French pianist, music educator, writer and composer of Spanish origin.

== Biography ==
Blanche Selva was born in Brive-la-Gaillarde in Corrèze. As a child, she studied piano with a number of teachers, took preparatory classes with Sophie Chéné, and was admitted to the Paris Conservatory in 1893. She studied with S. Chéné and won a medal in competition, but left the Conservatory without graduating.

Her family moved to Geneva, and Selva began giving concerts at the age of 13 in Lausanne. She studied with Vincent d'Indy, and became a professor at the Schola Cantorum de Paris in December 1901, later taking positions at the Conservatoire de Strasbourg, the École Normale de Musique in Paris, and the Prague Conservatory. Blanche Selva was the only French pianist of her time to specialise in Czech music, and she was consequently very popular in Czechoslovakia. She continued to tour and work as a concert pianist in Europe. By the age of 20 she had performed all of J.S. Bach's keyboard works in 17 recitals. Between 1906 and 1909 she premiered all four books of Isaac Albéniz's piano suite Iberia.

In January 1925 Selva moved to Barcelona, where she founded her own music school and performed in a duo with violinist Joan Massià. In 1930 she developed a paralysis that ended her performing career, but she continued teaching, writing and composing.

In 1936 she left Barcelona because of the Spanish Civil War and lived for a while in Marseille, then Moulins, Allier, and Saint-Saturnin, Puy-de-Dôme, Auvergne. Suffering from cancer, she entered a hospital in Saint-Amant-Tallende, where she died in December 1942 at age 59.

== Writings ==
Blanche Selva was active as a translator and transcriber. But her main work is a monumental 7-volumes work on piano technique:

- L'Enseignement musical de la Technique du Piano, Paris, from 1916 to 1925

This book proposes a radically new approach to piano playing. Her predilection for big arm gestures and descriptions of the most unusual types of attack, combined with the constant attention to the resulting tone-color, make his book a contribution to the history of the piano and its literature.

She also published professional articles in magazines and journals including Tablettes de la Schola, Le Monde Musical, La Revue Musicale and Le Revista Musical Catalana. Her other writings include:

- The Sonata, Study of its historical and expressive for the interpretation and hearing, Paris, 1913
- Sonatas para piano de Beethoven, Barcelona, 1927
- Déodat de Séverac, Paris, 1930 (about composer Déodat de Séverac)

== Works ==
Selected compositions include:

=== Music for piano/organ ===
- Paysage au soleil couchant (1904)
- Suite (Prélude, Allemande, Courante, Burla, Chanson, Farandole) for piano (1904)
- Cloches dans la brume for piano (1905)
- Cloches au soleil for piano (1905)
- Pièces for piano (1908)
- Petite pièce for organ (1908)
- La Vasque aux Colombes (1921)
- Primers Jocs for piano (1931)
- Le jeu du pentacorde qui vole, exercise for piano (1940)
- Transcriptions pour piano d'œuvres de Vincent d'Indy et César Franck (1910–1912)

=== Vocal and choral music ===
- Les Ancêtres du Lys (1905)
- Rosaire d'après Francis Jammes (1906)
- Venez sous la tonnelle d'après Francis Jammes (1908)
- Muntanya blava for voice and piano (1928)
- Mes de Maria for voice and piano (1929)
- Dix mélodies sur des poèmes catalans (1935)
- La Farigola (1926)
- El Tronc (1929)
- Quicumque Enim Spiritu Dei Aguntur (1929)
- Pensament Matinal (1931)
- O Fleurs des fleurs d'après Blanche Selva (1939)

=== Chamber and orchestral music ===
- La Nit de la Purissima (1929)
- Quatre pièces pour violon et piano (1934)
- Poème de la Resureccio ou Oratorio pascal (manuscript lost, 1938)

== Recordings ==
Selva's works have been recorded and issued on CD, including:

- Blanche Selva, une promenade musicale (Blanche Selva Association and the Centre International Albert Roussel)
- Malibran-Music (Association and Blanche Selva 2002).
