= Paddy Higson =

Scottish film producer (1941–2025)

- Born: Patricia Anne Frew; 2 June 1941; Belfast, Northern Ireland
- Died: 13 April 2025 (aged 83)
- Occupation: Film producer
- Notable work: Gregory's Girl

Patricia Anne "Paddy" Higson (née Frew; 2 June 1941 – 13 April 2025) was a Scottish producer of film and television. She is known for her work with Bill Forsyth, including the films That Sinking Feeling and Gregory's Girl.

== Early life ==
Patricia Anne Frew was born on 2 June 1941 in Belfast, Northern Ireland while her father was briefly stationed there while he served with the Royal Engineers during the Second World War. The family returned to Scotland and she grew up in Glasgow where she was educated at Laurel Bank School. After leaving school, she spent some time in France.

== Career ==
She began her career at the BBC in the 1970s as a production secretary. She met editor Patrick Higson there, and through the Films of Scotland Committee they became involved in making documentary films together. With Paddy now married to Patrick, he left the BBC in 1970 and set up a film company with Murray Grigor that they named Viz. A New Zealand costume drama series The Mackenzie Affair had scenes to be filmed on location in Scotland and when Viz were asked to support she spent five weeks in Ullapool with a crew of 40 people. She was production assistant on a documentary Blow by Blow which followed the Strathclyde Police Pipe Band who were former World Champions. It showed on television in 1977. In 1982 she made a film about the A9 road that runs for more than 250 miles from Central Scotland to the Highlands.

She was associate producer and production manager on Bill Forsyth's first feature film That Sinking Feeling which was released in 1979. It was made with a low budget with funding raised in Scotland and using youth theatre actors. She was producer for Charles Gormley's romantic comedy film Living Apart Together She was associate producer on Forsyth's comedy film Comfort and Joy which was released in 1984. In July 1984 Thorn EMI suggested her as associate producer for the adventure comedy film Restless Natives which would cost £1.25 million to make. She was producer for The Girl in the Picture which starred John Gordon Sinclair and was released in 1985 after being shot entirely in Glasgow's West End on a budget of only £850,000. She worked as producer on the film Orphans (1988) which was Peter Mullan's debut as director. She worked with Mullen again on The Magdalene Sisters as executive producer, with daughter Frances Higson the producer. She was the producer for Silent Scream which was David Hayman's first feature film as a director, released in 1990. Actor Iain Glen won a Silver Bear at the Berlin International Film Festival and the film itself won a Special Jury prize. She was production mentor for the short drama The Groundsman.

Higson was involved in the production of many television series, such as working for two series on the Scottish television crime drama Taggart and Jed Mercurio's Cardiac Arrest (1994–1996). She produced the political thriller Brond which aired in 1987, with John Hannah selected for his first role and Michael Caton-Jones directing. Other television series that she has worked on include: an episode of The Play on One that aired in 1990, Life Support, Monarch of the Glen and Nice Guy Eddie.

Higson founded the film and television production company Antonine Productions, in 1983 with her late husband, Patrick. When a lack of funding became apparent in 1991, the company was wound up. Antonine Films was set up by Higson and her daughter Frances in 1991 and wound up in 2001. Higson joined BBC Scotland again in 1990 on a one-year contract.

Higson ran the Black Cat Studios in Parkhead, purchasing a former cinema and operating the space for a range of film and television productions. The studios were used for Channel 4's first show broadcast live from Scotland Halfway to Paradise.

Higson joined Scottish film charity Glasgow Media Access Centre (GMAC Film) in 2014 as a member of the governing board, and took up the position of chief executive officer in 2019 which she held until her retirement in 2022. The charity made her their first patron. She was recognised to have given chances to some emerging talents.

== Personal life and death ==
In 1965, she married Patrick Higson, and they had three children; he died in 1983. She married Graham Harper in 1984, although this marriage only lasted a few years.

Higson died of cancer on 13 April 2025, at the age of 83.

== Honours and awards ==
In July 2007, Higson received an honorary degree from the Royal Scottish Academy of Music and Drama (RSAMD). Higson received a Scottish BAFTA for her outstanding contribution to the Scottish film industry in 2018. She was presented with the BAFTA Scotland Award by David Hayman who described her as the "mother of the Scottish film industry". She declined the offer of Officer of the Order of the British Empire (OBE) in the 2023 New Year Honours for services to the Film and Television Industry and to Diversity and Inclusion in Film and Television.
