= Brond (TV series) =

British television political thriller

- DVD cover art
- Genre: Drama; Thriller
- Created by: Frederic Lindsay
- Based on: Brond by Frederic Lindsay
- Written by: Frederic Lindsay
- Directed by: Michael Caton-Jones
- Starring: Stratford Johns; John Hannah; Louise Beattie; James Cosmo
- Composer: Bill Nelson
- Country of origin: United Kingdom
- Original language: English
- No. of series: 1
- No. of episodes: 3

Production
- Executive producer: Gareth Wardell
- Producer: Paddy Higson
- Production locations: Glasgow, Scotland
- Cinematography: Richard Greatrex
- Running time: 60 minutes

Original release
- Network: Channel 4
- Release: 13 May – 27 May 1987

Brond is a 1987 British three-part drama television series made by Channel 4, based on the novel of the same name by Scottish author Frederic Lindsay. It was directed by Michael Caton-Jones and starred Stratford Johns, John Hannah in his first television role, Louise Beattie and James Cosmo.

== Plot ==
Brond is a thriller set in Glasgow, Scotland. Stratford Johns plays the titular Brond, an amoral leader of the Scottish Liberation Army. Robert, a student at Glasgow University, played by John Hannah in his first screen role, witnesses Brond murdering a small boy on a bridge. Robert later meets Brond at a party, and gradually gets drawn into a sequence of violent events.

== Cast ==
- Stratford Johns as Brond
- John Hannah as Robert
- Louise Beattie as Margaret
- James Cosmo as Primo
- Bernadette Shortt as Jackie Kennedy
- Sandy Neilson as Baxter
- Raymond Ross as Professor Gracemount
- Billy McElhaney as Muldoon
- Ian McElhinney as Kennedy

== Production ==
Brond is adapted by its author from the novel of the same name. In 2005 Brond the novel was picked as one of the 100 Best Scottish Books of All Time.

Channel 4 commissioned musician Bill Nelson to compose the theme tune and music for the series. The music, co-written with Daryl Runswick, was released under the band name Scala. Paddy Higson was the producer.

== Home media ==
On 30 July 2018, Simply Media released Brond - The Complete Series on DVD.
