= TinyCo =

American mobile video game developer

- Type: Subsidiary
- Founded: 2009; 17 years ago
- Founder: Suli Ali
- Headquarters: San Francisco, California, U.S.
- Key people: Suli Ali (CEO)
- Products: Mobile applications, video games
- Parent: Jam City, Inc.
- Website: tinyco.com

TinyCo is a mobile video game studio and the creator of Family Guy: The Quest for Stuff, Futurama Worlds of Tomorrow, Marvel Avengers Academy, Guess!, Spellstorm, Tiny Castle, Tiny Monsters, Tiny Village, and Tiny Zoo.

== History ==
The San Francisco studio was founded by Suli Ali and Ian Spivey in 2009. The company started as a Facebook game developer and switched to a mobile app focus in late 2010. They originally specialized in social video games such as Guess!, Spellstorm, Tiny Castle, Tiny Monsters, Tiny Village, and Tiny Zoo.

In February 2011, the company raised $18 million in series A funding led by venture capital firm Andreessen Horowitz and including Anthony Casalena and SV Angel. Marc Andreessen joined Suli Ali on the company's board of directors as part of this investment round.

In May 2011, the company launched a $5 million investment fund, called the TinyFund, to help support development of mobile games. The TinyFund provided developers up to $500,000 per title, to help create games played on the iPhone, iPad or Android. In addition, TinyCo agreed to offer marketing, development and business assistance as needed.

In November 2013, the company raised $20 million in series B funding from Andreessen Horowitz and Pinnacle Ventures. Part of this investment was resolving the company's debt. This funding round was preceded by layoffs at the company and also signified a new strategy that emphasizes deeper game play and higher budget titles such as Family Guy: The Quest for Stuff. Mike O’Brien joined the company's board as a part of this investment round.

In July 2016, TinyCo was acquired by Jam City, the mobile game publisher behind Cookie Jam, Panda Pop, and Genies and Gems.

== List of mobile applications ==
See List of video games for mobile video games

Title	First Release Date	Platform(s)
Elf Ur Face	December 2, 2010	iOS
Elf Ur Face Pro	December 2, 2010	iOS
Xmas Booth Free	December 12, 2010	iOS

== List of video games ==
Title	First Release Date	Platform(s)	Developer	Publisher
Futurama: Worlds of Tomorrow	June 29, 2017	Android, iOS	TinyCo	Fox Digital Entertainment
Marvel Avengers Academy	February 3, 2016	Android, iOS	TinyCo	
Family Guy: The Quest for Stuff	April 10, 2014	Android, iOS	TinyCo	Fox Digital Entertainment
Spellstorm	February 26, 2013	Android, iOS	TinyCo	
Super Slots - Slot Machines	July 26, 2012	Android, iOS	TinyCo	
Tap Resort Party	October 31, 2011	Android	TinyCo	
Tiny Castle	November 30, 2012	Android, iOS	TinyCo	
Tiny Chef	November 13, 2010	iOS	TinyCo	
Tiny Monsters	March 29, 2012	Android, iOS	TinyCo	
Tiny Nightclub	April 21, 2011	iOS	TinyCo	
Tiny Village	October 1, 2011	Android, iOS	TinyCo	
Tiny Zoo Friends	September 14, 2011	iOS	TinyCo	
VIP Poker	February 26, 2011	Android, iOS	TinyCo	
VIP Poker HD	February 3, 2012	iOS	TinyCo	
