= Predators (video game) =

2010 video game

- Developers: Angry Mob Games; Chillingo
- Publishers: Chillingo (iOS); Fox Digital Entertainment (Android)
- Platforms: iOS, Android
- Release: iOS; July 1, 2010; Android; November 9, 2012
- Genre: Real-time strategy
- Mode: Single-player

Predators, sometimes mislabeled as Robert Rodriguez presents Predators, is a real-time strategy tie-in to the Predator franchise, based on the 2010 film of the same name. The game was developed by independent game developer Angry Mob Games and was released for iOS on July 1, 2010, over a week before the film's theatrical release. The game was later ported to Android and published by Fox Digital Entertainment in 2012.

== Reception ==
Reception

Aggregate score
Aggregator	Score
Metacritic	70/100

Review scores
Publication	Score
Destructoid	7/10
Edge	4/10
IGN	8.5/10
Pocket Gamer	3.5/5
VideoGamer.com	6/10

The iOS version received "mixed or average reviews" according to the review aggregation website Metacritic.

== See also ==
- List of Alien, Predator, and Alien vs. Predator games
