= Crisis on the Planet of the Apes VR =

2018 video game

- Developer: Imaginati
- Publisher: FoxNext
- Engine: Unreal Engine 4
- Platforms: PlayStation 4 Microsoft Windows
- Release: April 3, 2018
- Genre: Action
- Mode: Single-player

Crisis on the Planet of the Apes VR is a 2018 action and virtual reality game. It was developed by Imaginati and published by FoxNext for PlayStation 4 and Microsoft Windows. It is based on the Planet of the Apes reboot film series, taking place between Rise of the Planet of the Apes and Dawn of the Planet of the Apes.

Crisis on the Planet of the Apes received negative reviews.

== Gameplay ==
Crisis on the Planet of the Apes VR is a virtual reality action game played from a first-person perspective. The game is set five years after the film Rise of the Planet of the Apes, and prior to the events of Dawn of the Planet of the Apes. The Simian Flu has wiped out half of the human population and has resulted in an uprising of highly intelligent apes. The player takes on the role of an ape who has been imprisoned at a research facility by humans searching for a cure. The player's objective is to escape and rejoin Caesar's group of apes. Along the way, the player teams up with two other captured apes, Bone and Spear.

The game is played on a linear path, with the player performing ape-like movements to progress to predetermined spots in the environment. Human guards are encountered throughout the game and must be killed before proceeding. The player can use three types of guns, and can take cover during shootouts. The player can also climb pipes and swing from ceilings.

== Development and release ==
Planet of the Apes virtual reality game was initially announced in January 2017. The game's title and plot were unveiled a year later. It was developed by Imaginati, the creator of Planet of the Apes: Last Frontier (2017). The game was developed using Unreal Engine.

It was published by FoxNext. Crisis on the Planet of the Apes VR was released on April 3, 2018 for Oculus headsets as well as the HTC Vive and PlayStation VR headsets.

== Reception ==
Reception

Aggregate score
Aggregator	Score
Metacritic	49/100 (PS4); 54/100 (PC)

Review scores
Publication	Score
4Players	55/100
HobbyConsolas	74/100
IGN	3/10
Jeuxvideo.com	9/20
Empire	3/5
Vandal	4.5/10

Reviewers criticized the game's short length at roughly two hours. Matt Kamen of Empire stated that it "dabbles with interesting ideas and mechanics that could have expanded the range of play options" but which instead are "reduced to one-use scripted moments". He concluded that "with a bigger budget, longer run time, and a beefier story, Crisis could have done great things for VR".

The inability to freely explore levels was criticized. Kamen opined that the game feels "like more of a guided VR experience than a full game in its own right". Jeuxvideo.com criticized the difficulty, as well as player tracking issues. Others found the gameplay sluggish and the controls awkward or frustrating. The game received some praise for its graphics and VR immersion.

Calum Marsh of IGN considered the game repetitive and felt that it lacked "the depth and seriousness" of the films.Ian Dean of PlayStation Official Magazine – UK called the game a "wonderful rabbit hole" for fans of the film series, but noted there are "no hidden secrets to uncover".
