= Fox Entertainment Group =

American entertainment company (1985–2019)

- Logo used until 2019
- Formerly: Fox, Inc. (1985-1998)
- Type: Division
- Traded as: NYSE: FOX
- Industry: Film; Television
- Predecessor: TCF Holdings
- Founded: 1985; 41 years ago
- Founder: Rupert Murdoch
- Defunct: March 20, 2019; 7 years ago
- Fate: Assets dispersed to other Disney divisions, name reused by Fox Corporation for their entertainment division
- Successors: Fox Entertainment (division of Fox Corporation, successor of the reused unit name for Fox Corp. entertainment operations without using the word "Group"); Walt Disney Studios
- Headquarters: Fox Plaza, Century City, Los Angeles, California, U.S.
- Products: Motion pictures television programs
- Revenue: ▲$13.28 billion USD (2012)
- Operating income: ▲$3.3 billion USD (2012)
- Net income: ▲$4.98 billion USD (2012)
- Number of employees: 12,100 (2012)
- Parent: News Corporation (1990–2013); 21st Century Fox (2013–2019)
- Subsidiaries: 20th Century Fox; Fox 2000 Pictures; Fox Music; Fox Searchlight Pictures; Fox Star Studios (JV with Star India); Fox Studios Australia; FoxNext; Hulu (30%); Regency Enterprises (20%); Fox Broadcasting Company; FX Networks

Fox Entertainment Group (FEG) was an American entertainment company specialized in filmed entertainment owned by 21st Century Fox. Following the acquisition of 21st Century Fox by Disney, the group's assets were dispersed to various Disney units. The film studios 20th Century Fox (now known as 20th Century Studios), Fox Searchlight Pictures (now known as Searchlight Pictures) and Fox 2000 Pictures were transferred to Walt Disney Studios, while Fox Star Studios (now known as Star Studios) was transferred to Disney India.

Its former owner, 21st Century Fox, previously known as News Corporation, had acquired all the stock of Fox Entertainment Group in 2005. In 2013, News Corporation was renamed 21st Century Fox, and its publishing assets were spun off into the newly formed News Corp as part of a corporate reorganization.

FEG was indirectly named after William Fox, who created Fox Film. This eventually merged with Twentieth Century Pictures to become 20th Century Fox (now known as 20th Century Studios).

== History ==
Fox Entertainment Group was formed in the 1980s after the purchase of the Metromedia-owned independent stations by the 20th Century Fox film studio, at the time jointly owned by Australian-American media mogul Rupert Murdoch's News Corporation, and Denver billionaire Marvin Davis. These stations would later become the foundation of the Fox television network (launched in October 1986), which would become the foundation of the company (named after the TV network) itself. Not long after the Metromedia deal was made, Murdoch purchased Davis's shares and News Corp assumed full control of the film studio, which was then placed within Fox Entertainment Group.

In 1995, Saban entered into a joint venture with the Fox children's television network to form Fox Kids Worldwide. In 1997 it was renamed Fox Family Worldwide. On July 23, 2001, Saban announced that Fox Family Worldwide (now ABC Family Worldwide Inc.) would be sold to Disney. On October 24, 2001, the sale was completed.

On March 20, 1998, Fox Entertainment Group (under the management of Rupert Murdoch) purchased the Los Angeles Dodgers from Peter O'Malley on $311-million of dollars. On January 20, 2004, Fox Entertainment Group sold the Dodgers to Frank McCourt.

On August 14, 1998, Fox launched an initial public offering as a publicly traded company, trading on the New York Stock Exchange (NYSE,) while Fox Entertainment Group's address has been moved from Los Angeles to New York City. The company has traded on the NYSE since its launch under ticker symbol FOX until its acquisition in 2005 by News Corporation.

In January 2005, shortly after News Corporation reincorporation in the United States, News Corp announced that it was offering $5.9 billion to buy out the remaining 18% of shares in Fox that News Corporation did not already own. The maneuver delisted Fox from the New York Stock Exchange; Fox Entertainment Group traded on the NYSE under the ticker FOX.

In 2012, Rupert Murdoch announced that News Corporation would be split into two publishing and media-oriented companies: a new News Corporation, and 21st Century Fox, which operated Fox Entertainment Group and 20th Century Fox and other studios. Murdoch considered the name of the new company a way to maintain the 20th Century Fox's heritage as the group advances into the future.

In January 2017, Fox Entertainment Group and 20th Century Fox formed FoxNext, which would handle video game developments, VR experiences and theme park businesses.

After Disney completed the acquisition of the 21st Century Fox assets on March 20, 2019, Fox Entertainment Group assets became Disney properties and are now reorganized under other Disney units. The Fox Entertainment name would later be used by the Fox Corporation for its entertainment assets.

== Units ==
=== Transferred to The Walt Disney Studios ===
- 20th Century Fox, renamed 20th Century Studios
  - 20th Century Fox Animation, renamed 20th Century Animation
    - Blue Sky Studios, closed on April 10, 2021
  - 20th Century Fox Games, renamed 20th Century Games
  - Fox Family, renamed 20th Century Family
    - Fox Family Entertainment, renamed 20th Century Family Entertainment
  - New Regency Productions (20%, joint venture with Regency Enterprises)
- Fox Searchlight Pictures, renamed Searchlight Pictures
- Fox 2000 Pictures, dissolved on May 14, 2021
- 20th Century Fox Consumer Products, folded into Disney Experiences
- Fox Music, folded into Disney Music Group
- Zero Day Fox, renamed 20th Digital Studio before dissolving on October 9, 2023
- Boom! Studios (minority stake)
  - Fox Studios Australia, renamed Disney Studios Australia
  - Fox Stage Productions, folded into Disney Theatrical Group

=== Transferred to Walt Disney Television ===
- 20th Century Fox Television, renamed 20th Television
  - Fox 21 Television Studios, renamed Touchstone Television before merging with 20th Television on December 1, 2020
  - Fox Television Animation, renamed 20th Television Animation

=== Transferred to Walt Disney Direct-to-Consumer & International ===
- Fox Star Studios, renamed Star Studios
- Hulu (30%)
- Hulu Documentary Films
- 20th Century Fox Home Entertainment, renamed 20th Century Home Entertainment and eventually became nothing more than a label of Walt Disney Studios Home Entertainment in 2020
  - Fox-Paramount Home Entertainment (joint venture with Paramount Home Media Distribution)

=== Transferred to Disney Parks, Experiences and Products ===
- FoxNext, closed on January 23, 2020 and sold to Scopely
  - Aftershock Studios
- 20th Century Fox World (license to Resort World by Genting Group)

=== Sold ===
- Fox Family Worldwide – sold to The Walt Disney Company in July 2001 before being reunited 18 years later in 2019.
  - BVS Entertainment library
  - Fox Kids/Fox Children's Productions/Fox Family library
    - Marvel Films Animation/New World Animation library
      - DePatie–Freleng Enterprises/Marvel Productions library
        - Dr. Seuss animated TV specials (rights currently owned by Warner Bros. Discovery under the Dr. Seuss Foundation)
    - Power Rangers (rights currently owned by HASBRO)
    - Digimon (rights currently owned by Toei Animation)
    - Dragon Ball Z (general English dubbing and broadcasting rights currently owned by Sony Pictures under Crunchyroll, LLC excluding The Tree of Might, Battle of Gods, Resurrection 'F' and Broly are currently owned by Disney Studios via Buena Vista International and 20th Century Studios)
  - SIP Animation
- FitTV - sold to Discovery Communications (later Warner Bros. Discovery, now Skydance Corporation) on September 1, 2001

=== Defunct ===
- Fox Reality Channel (2005–2010)
- Fox Sports Houston (2009–2012)

== See also ==
- Fox on Demand
