= The Groundsman =

- Film poster
- Directed by: Jonny Blair
- Written by: Jonny Blair
- Produced by: Kenny MacKay; Carol Brown; Adam McIlwaine; Paddy Higson
- Starring: David O'Hara; Brian McCardie
- Cinematography: Andrew Wright
- Edited by: Conor Meechan
- Music by: Alexander Horowitz
- Production company: Royal Conservatoire of Scotland
- Release date: 20 June 2013
- Running time: 16 minutes
- Country: United Kingdom
- Language: English

The Groundsman is a 2013 short film produced by the Royal Conservatoire of Scotland. Written & Directed by Jonny Blair, Starring David O'Hara. The film depicts a lonely football groundsman named Keith (O'Hara) who finds out his club has gone out of business, but instead of moving on with his life and acknowledging his past affairs, he tries his utmost to keep the club running.

The film screened for the first time at Cineworld in Glasgow on 20 June 2013 with the four other graduation films.

In 2014, the film was nominated for 3 Bafta Scotland New Talent awards for Best Editing, Best Fiction and Best Writing. It went on to win Best Fiction and Best Editing.

== Cast ==
- David O'Hara as Keith
- Brian McCardie as Steve

== Production ==
Filming started on Sunday 5 May for a half day until Friday 10 May 2013. Also was a half day in April where a football match was shot. David O'Hara was cast as Keith, whom Jonny Blair knew personally, with Brian McCardie, Jim Sweeney, Darran Lightbody and Frank Lovering (Benburb manager) rounding out the cast. Locations were a house in King's Park, Tinto Park in Govan, home of Benburb FC which the film was built around, Bell's Bar on Govan Road and a country road near Bishopton.

== Accolades ==
- Flutlicht Fussball Film Festival Official Selection 2016
- 2ANNAS Riga International Film Festival Official Selection 2015
- Williamsburg Independent Film Festival Official Selection 2014
- Aguilar de Campoo Short Film Festival 2014 / In Competition
- Inverness Film Festival Official Selection 2014
- CineFringe Film Festival Official Selection 2014
- Southside Film Festival Official Selection 2014
- 11mm Fussballfilmfestival Official Selection 2014
- Hollywood Reel Independent Film Festival Official Selection 2014 / In competition for Best Student Short
- Glasgow Short Film Festival Official Selection 2014 / In competition for Scottish Competition
- London Short Film Festival Official Selection 2014
- Royal Television Society Scotland 2014, Nomination for Best Student Fiction
- BAFTA Scotland New Talent Awards 2014, Won Best Fiction and Best Editing
