= Lorna McGhee =

Scottish flutist (born 1972)

Lorna McGhee (born 1972) is a Scottish flutist and teacher, who since 2024 holds the position of principal flute at the Boston Symphony Orchestra. She served as principal flute of the Pittsburgh Symphony Orchestra from 2012 to 2024. In addition, she is an Artist Lecturer in Flute at Carnegie Mellon University. Past positions include co-principal flute of the BBC Symphony Orchestra and associate professor of flute at the University of British Columbia. She is currently a member of a flute, viola, and harp ensemble, 'Trio Verlaine' with her husband, violist David Harding and harpist Heidi Krutzen. McGhee is known for her "luscious tone colors and dynamics."

== Career ==
Lorna McGhee was born in 1972 and grew up in the Scottish town of Largs. She began playing the flute at 8 years old, and at age 11 began her studies at the Royal Scottish Academy of Music in Glasgow with David Nicholson, then principal flute of the Scottish Chamber Orchestra. She continued her studies in London at the Royal Academy of Music with William Bennett and Michie Bennett. She won the position of co-principal flute in the BBC Symphony Orchestra immediately following her graduation from RAM. Following this position, she taught flute for a year at the University of Michigan, which she later said she was "too young for."

After her marriage to violist David Harding, she moved to an adjunct flute teaching position at the University of British Columbia. During this time, she pursued a master's degree in liberal studies while she reevaluated the role of music in her life. This journey ultimately led her to believe "it is always a choice about playing, we are under no compulsion to play." In 2012, she succeeded Robert Langevin as principal flute of the Pittsburgh Symphony Orchestra. Three years later, McGhee succeeded Jeanne Baxstresser on the flute faculty at Carnegie Mellon University in 2015.

McGhee is active and sought after as an orchestral musician, having performed as guest principal flutist with the London Symphony Orchestra, London Philharmonic Orchestra, Chicago Symphony, Minnesota Orchestra and the Academy of St. Martins-in-the-Field. In addition, she has performed concertos with the London Symphony Orchestra, BBC Scottish Symphony Orchestra, Manitoba Chamber Orchestra, Toronto Philharmonia, Victoria Symphony, and the Oregon Bach Festival Orchestra. She counts performing with the 2004 Oregon Bach Festival Orchestra as a career highlight, where she performed Krzysztof Penderecki's flute concerto under the baton of the composer. In addition to actively performing, she teaches at several summer flute classes including the Pender Island Flute Retreat and the William Bennett International Summer School. Lorna is an Artist with Altus Flutes since 2011. Recently, she won the principal flute position at the Boston Symphony Orchestra.

== Teaching philosophy ==
McGhee has made extensive use of the Alexander Technique, which she credits as helping her free her sound and play without pain. In turn, she uses these techniques with her students, helping them to become "artists of the breath." Her teaching philosophy tries "to awaken the student’s own curiosity, enthusiasm, discernment, and artistry. I encourage a love, and reverence for the music, respect for one’s own work and a ‘generosity towards’, not ‘fear of’ the audience."

== Discography ==
- The Hour of Dreaming; Lorna McGhee, flute, Piers Lane, piano (2014) Beep Records (Track List here)

With Trio Verlaine

- Fin de Siècle: the music by Debussy and Ravel
- Six Departures

With Heidi Krutzen

- Taheke, 20th century Masterpieces for flute and harp
- Canada, New Works for flute and harp

== Personal life ==
McGhee is married to violist David Harding, Professor of Viola and Chamber Music at Carnegie Mellon. The couple met at a summer festival, while he was a part of a string quartet at Indiana University. The pair performed and taught together in British Columbia, before the move to Pittsburgh. Together, the couple form Trio Verlaine with harpist Heidi Krutzen.
