= Jonny Blair =

Scottish film director and screenwriter

- Born: 22 June 1992 (age 33); Paisley, Renfrewshire, Scotland
- Occupation(s): Film Director, Screenwriter
- Years active: 2010–present
- Notable work: The Groundsman

Jonny Blair is a Scottish film director and screenwriter best known for his short film The Groundsman starring David O'Hara. His film, The Groundsman won the Best Fiction and Best Editing accolades at the 2014 British Academy Scotland New Talent Awards.

Blair is a graduate of the National Film and Television School.

== Awards ==
Year	Nominated Work	Awards	Category	Result
2014	The Groundsman	British Academy Scotland New Talent Awards	Best Fiction	Won
2014	The Groundsman	British Academy Scotland New Talent Awards	Best Writer	Nominated

== Filmography ==
=== Writer/Director ===
- Come Out of the Woods (2017)
- The Groundsman (2013)
