= Joan Massià =

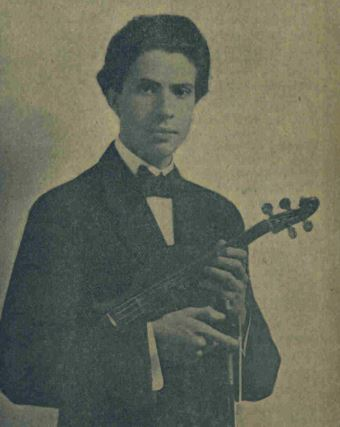
Portrait of Joan Massià I Prats

Joan Massià i Prats (Barcelona, 22 February 1890 – 11 June 1969) was a Catalan composer and violinist.

His first wife was the pianist and student of d'Indy, Blanche Selva (1884–1942), with whom Massià recorded the Franck violin sonata and other works. After her death he remarried; his second wife was the Spanish pianist María Carbonell (1911–1988). His students included the violinist Gonçal Comellas.

== Selected discography as violinist ==
- Franck violin sonata - with his first wife, Blanche Selva

== Own compositions, editions and recordings ==
- Set Cançons Sobre Poemes de Tomàs Garcés - Seven poems in Catalan.

Recording

- Set Cançons - Songs. Carmen Bustamante accompanied by Manuel García Morante and José Carreras accompanied by David Giménez (piano). With historical recordings by pianist María Carbonell. La Ma De Guido.

== Personal archive ==
The personal archive of Joan Massià i Prats has been donated to the Universitat Autònoma de Barcelona and is held in the Humanities Library. The archive comprises part of his personal and professional papers, together with a selection of books from his personal library.
