= The Simpsons: Tapped Out =

Discontinued mobile video game (2012–2025)

- Developer: EA Mobile
- Publisher: EA Mobile
- Platforms: iOS, Android, Amazon Fire
- Release: iOS: WW: March 1, 2012–January 24, 2025; Android: NA: February 6, 2013–January 24, 2025; EU: February 14, 2013–January 24, 2025
- Genre: City building
- Modes: Single-player, multiplayer

The Simpsons: Tapped Out was a city-building mobile game for iOS and Android based on the American media franchise The Simpsons. It allowed users to create and maintain their own version of Springfield using familiar characters and buildings. The game was regularly updated with new content, often seasonal and holiday-themed, for example, during holidays like Thanksgiving, and Treehouse of Horror episodes-related content for Halloween. The game was available in several languages such as English, French, Turkish, Italian, German, Simplified Chinese, Peninsular Spanish and both European Portuguese and Brazilian Portuguese. It was developed and published by EA Mobile and launched worldwide on March 1, 2012, for iOS and on February 6, 2013, for Android. The game was released for Amazon Fire devices in several markets on June 24, 2013.

According to its own estimates as of 2014, Electronic Arts generated over $130 million in revenue since the game's release. The game was shut down on January 24, 2025. A community-maintained continuation of the game was released soon after the game's closure.

== Gameplay ==
In Tapped Out, players were instructed with building their own Springfield town.

The Simpsons: Tapped Out was a city-building game. It offered buildings that the player buys with "Money ($)" in-game currency. Premium items were bought with Donuts which could also be purchased with real-world cash. The player used building and characters to make progress. By completing quests and levels, the player collected more characters and buildings to unlock more quests and levels. Each building generated in-game money to collect, under names such as "Income tax" from houses and the "Marking up Prices" for the Kwik-E-Mart. Players could place rivers, roads, pavement and decorations on the land.

The game was supported by EA's Origin, which acted as a social bridge to where players log into their Origin accounts and visit friends' towns to collect cash every 24 hours.

Since the May 18, 2016, update, the maximum number of levels is 939. This is a reference to the episode "A Tale of Two Springfields", which shows the Simpsons' area code.

Content updates had been released for the game, with new game content or limited-time events related to episode promotions or holidays. Major events included a temporary currency, which win the player limited edition prizes.

== Plot ==
Too busy playing a Happy Little Elves-themed game on his myPad at work, Homer Simpson neglects his workstation and accidentally causes a meltdown at the nuclear power plant, leading to the complete destruction of Springfield. Left stranded, he is solely responsible for rebuilding Springfield and bringing back its town members. Homer is desperate to find other characters so that he can get them to rebuild, and he can get back to his elf game. With the help of Lisa, Homer rebuilds Springfield and brings back key sought-out characters.

== Development ==
According to game runner and longtime Simpsons writer J. Stewart Burns, the game originally started as a "labor of love" and he didn't expect much to happen after the game's release. Although they did not get credited, there are about ten writers who worked on the game, including Simpsons writers Burns, Matt Selman, Brian Kelley, Jeff Westbrook, Jon Kern, Carolyn Omine and Diana Wright.

== Closure ==
On September 26, 2024, Electronic Arts announced that the game servers would be shutting down on January 24, 2025, with in-app purchases being disabled. It was delisted from the App Store and Google Play on October 31, 2024, while users who still had the app downloaded were able to continue playing the game until January 24, 2025. After that, the game servers went permanently offline and the game was discontinued, becoming unplayable.

=== Community continuation ===
In the final month before the game's shutdown, the community archived as many player worlds as possible. Over 3 million of the estimated 80 million player worlds that existed were archived, primarily those active near the end of the game's operation. In March 2025, "Project Springfield" became the main fan-maintained continuation of the game, providing an installable version that addressed existing bugs and added new, unimplemented and previously time-limited content to the game.

== Reception ==
The game has a score of 69 out of 100 on Metacritic, indicating "Mixed or average reviews". Daniel Bischoff from GameRevolution summarized their review by saying, "The Simpsons has everything you need for an excellent free-to-play game, including universal appeal, a wealth of material, and excellent little sound bytes like "D'oh" and Krusty's iconic laugh. It's just a shame that Electronics Arts has to choke the life out of that wonder with their oppressive Origin service." Max Eddy from PCMag described the game as "[walking] a delicate line between miserable money-maker and actual entertainment. So far it's done a good job being fun, but it's a balance that's easily upset".

=== Technical issue on iOS ===
Shortly after the iOS launch, the game was pulled from the iOS App Store due to EA's servers being unable to cope with the demand and a plethora of serious glitches reported by users. After a month had passed, EA set up a forum whereby users could report bug issues, but failed to offer solutions to issues or temporary updates. Some users who had made in-app purchases discovered that their purchases had vanished. After contacting EA, users were able to collect refunds directly from Apple. Several months later on August 16, 2012, the app returned to the App Store. The bug remained in the game for some time before eventually being patched.

=== Criticism and media appearances ===
Due to criticism of the larger trend of freemium games' revenue structure, the game was satirized in the South Park episode "Freemium Isn't Free" as exploitative and lacking in gameplay. The game itself earlier lampooned this point during an in-game conversation between two characters. In The Simpsons season 25 episode "Labor Pains," Homer opens the game on his phone and is automatically charged $500.

=== Accolades ===
The game won the People's Voice Award for "Strategy/Simulation" at the 2018 Webby Awards.

== See also ==
- List of The Simpsons video games
- Family Guy: The Quest for Stuff
- Futurama: Worlds of Tomorrow
