= Heidi Krutzen =

Canadian harpist

- Origin: Vancouver, Canada
- Genres: Classical
- Occupation: Musician
- Instrument: Harp
- Years active: 2001–present
- Member of: Philharmonia Orchestra; Turning Point Ensemble; Trio Verlaine; Couloir
- Formerly of: CBC Radio Orchestra; Vancouver Opera Orchestra; Krutzen/McGhee Duo
- Website: heidikrutzen.com

Heidi Krutzen is a harpist. She is the principal harpist for the Philharmonia Orchestra, a member of the Turning Point Ensemble, and a chamber musician and soloist. She is the former principal harp at the CBC Radio Orchestra and the Vancouver Opera Orchestra.

== Career ==
Krutzen joined the Philharmonia Orchestra as the principal harpist in 2015. At the time, she was based in Vancouver and a member of three chamber music groups: the Krutzen/McGhee Duo, Trio Verlaine, and Couloir. Since then, she has continued to perform with chamber groups, including Couloir and Trio Verlaine.

Flutist Lorna McGhee and Krutzen met in 2001 as soloists at a concerto, and in 2004 released the CD Taheke: 20th-Century Masterpieces for Flute and Harp as the Krutzen/McGhee Duo. With the Turning Point Ensemble and mezzo-soprano Judith Forst, Krutzen released the CD Disasters of the Sun: Music of Barbara Pentland in 2006. Trio Verlaine is composed of Krutzen, McGhee, and violist David Harding, and they released their first CD Fin de Siècle – Music of Debussy and Ravel in 2008, and Six Departures in 2014. Couloir formed in Vancouver in 2010, and consists of cellist Ariel Barnes and Krutzen. Couloir released the CD Wine Dark Sea in 2013 and Maxwell, Muhly & Couloir in 2016. Couloir was also featured on the 2019 album New Jewish Music Vol.2, with Krutzen and Barnes each performing as soloists.

In a 2016 Bachtrack review of a Philharmonia performance of Orpheus, Dominic Lowe writes, "Heidi Krutzen's performance on the harp was technically excellent and emotionally touching." In a 2016 review for The Arts Desk, David Nice writes, "The core of Orpheus is his dance-song for Hades' tormented inhabitants, a homage to Bach's cantatas and passions which is typically spare – perhaps the reprise shared between Jill Crowther's cor anglais and harpist Heidi Krutzen, the dominant colourist of the work, was even more ineffable than the initial duet for two oboes".

A 2017 Bachtrack review by Mark Valencia of a Philharmonia performance includes, "Luke Whitehead's mellow contrabassoon and Heidi Krutzen's expressive harp playing were beacons along the way to the work's widescreen finale", and a 2020 Bachtrack review by Cameron Kelsall of a Philharmonia performance states "Heidi Krutzen supplied gossamer chords on the harp." In a 2022 Musical Opinion review of a Philharmonia performance, Edward Clark writes, "I choose to celebrate: Heidi Krutzen, harp; Elizabeth Burley, celeste; Samuel Coles, principal flute; the horn section and the vigorous cello principal, Karen Stephenson."

== Philanthropy ==
After visiting Zambia in 2011, Krutzen formed the Malambo Grassroots organization with Jocelyn Banyard to collect and send donations of musical instruments to Africa, and 126 instruments were sent to Zambia in 2012.
