= Juan Oliver y Astorga =

Spanish composer (1733–1830)

Juan Oliver y Astorga (1733–1830) was a Spanish composer. Oliver y Astorga spent several successful years in London before returning to Spain to take up a post as violinist in the Capilla Real, Madrid, in 1776.
