= Futurama: Worlds of Tomorrow =

2017 mobile game based on Futurama series

- Launch screen for Futurama: Worlds of Tomorrow
- Developer: TinyCo
- Publisher: Jam City
- Platforms: iOS, Android
- Release: June 29, 2017-April 20, 2023
- Genres: City building game Adventure
- Mode: Single-player

Futurama: Worlds of Tomorrow was a freemium mobile game for iOS and Android, based on the American animated sitcom series Futurama. It was released on June 29, 2017 and featured stories written by writers from the TV series with the show's original cast voicing their respective characters.

On March 9, 2023, it was announced that Futurama: Worlds of Tomorrow would be shutting down on April 20, 2023. On April 20th, the servers were officially closed and the game became unplayable.

== Story ==
After the Hypnotoad mesmerizes Professor Farnsworth into ordering the Planet Express crew to make a "delivery" to the amphibian homeworld Amphibios 9, the Hypnotoad tears through timespace to an alternate universe, bringing a female Hypnotoad to the current universe. This scatters the universe and all its inhabitants except for Fry and Nibbler. With the help of Nibbler, Fry must help put the universe back together and save his friends, particularly Leela, rebuilding New New York and bringing back key sought-out characters along the way.

== Gameplay ==
Worlds of Tomorrow tasks the player with saving New New York and the characters within it from hypnowaves that have spread across the universe due to the Hypnotoad deciding to mate. The game presents the player with a portion of New New York, with more areas being unlocked as they progress through the game by clearing areas using Robot 1-X. Characters from the show wander through the map, with more characters able to be unlocked by clearing areas of hypnowaves or purchasing them using pizza. Pizza is a special currency that is rare to come across, but can be bought in bulk via microtransactions. The player can construct buildings that generate in-game currency (Nixonbucks) or XP points, as well as place decorations around the map. Space missions take the player to different planets, allowing them to pick a small selection of available characters with them on the trip to participate in battles. Space missions award the player with hypnotons and career chips that allow them to clear areas of the map and level up characters, respectively. Characters can also perform "actions" that generate Nixonbucks or XP over time. In addition, outfits for certain characters can be unlocked, giving them different abilities. The game also features limited-time events based on real-life holidays, celebrity appearances, and episodes from the television series.

== Promotion ==
An animated trailer for the game was released on May 17, 2017. The trailer features Fry (Billy West), Leela (Katey Sagal), Bender (John DiMaggio), Amy (Lauren Tom), Lrrr (Maurice LaMarche) and the Hypnotoad. An animated launch date trailer was released on June 20, 2017 prior to the date of launch. It features the voices of Neil deGrasse Tyson, Bill Nye, George Takei, and Stephen Hawking.

An audio-only episode featuring the original cast members was released in 2017 as an episode of The Nerdist Podcast in an effort to promote Futurama: Worlds of Tomorrow.

== Reception ==
Reception

Aggregate score
Aggregator	Score
Metacritic	64/100

Futurama: Worlds of Tomorrow received "mixed or average" reviews, according to review aggregator Metacritic. The game was nominated for Outstanding Achievement in Videogame Writing at the Writers Guild of America Awards 2017.
