= Colin Digiaro =

Colin Digiaro is an American business executive. Alongside Chris DeWolfe and Aber Whitcomb, he was a co-founder of MySpace and Jam City. At MySpace, he was the Senior Vice President of International Corporate Development, a post he left in 2008 to found Slingshot Labs, an Internet incubator owned by News Corporation.

Digiaro holds a B.S. in Policy from the University of Southern California; he lives in Los Angeles.

== Career ==
Digiaro has been involved in the expansion efforts of a number of startups. Most notably, Digiaro co-founded MySpace where he oversaw advertising sales, operations, and strategy. Digiaro led the effort to position MySpace as an advertising platform, introducing nearly every major Fortune 100 brand advertiser to social media, generating annualized ad revenues of over $490 million during Myspace's in 2009. During Myspace's lifetime, Digiaro was also the one that worked on obtaining the website's "first mobile deal with Helio".

=== History ===
Before the formation of Myspace, Digiaro worked at an internet-based company called ResponseBase, which sold electronic books and other direct marketing materials through email. Digiaro was first invited to the company by an old friend, Chris DeWolfe, whom he had worked with in earlier years at the First Bank of Beverly Hills. ResponseBase became a steadily larger company over time and an offer was made by eUniverse to buy the company. During the course of involvement with eUniverse, Responsebase members created what was to become Myspace. However, due to a number of incidents, by 2003, eUniverse ended up owing ResponseBase a significant amount of "earnout money". This was paid off by giving ResponseBase employees one-third of the shares in Myspace, with Digiaro being one of the six ResponseBase employees to earn a portion of the shares.
