= Richard Rosenblatt =

American entrepreneur (born 1969)

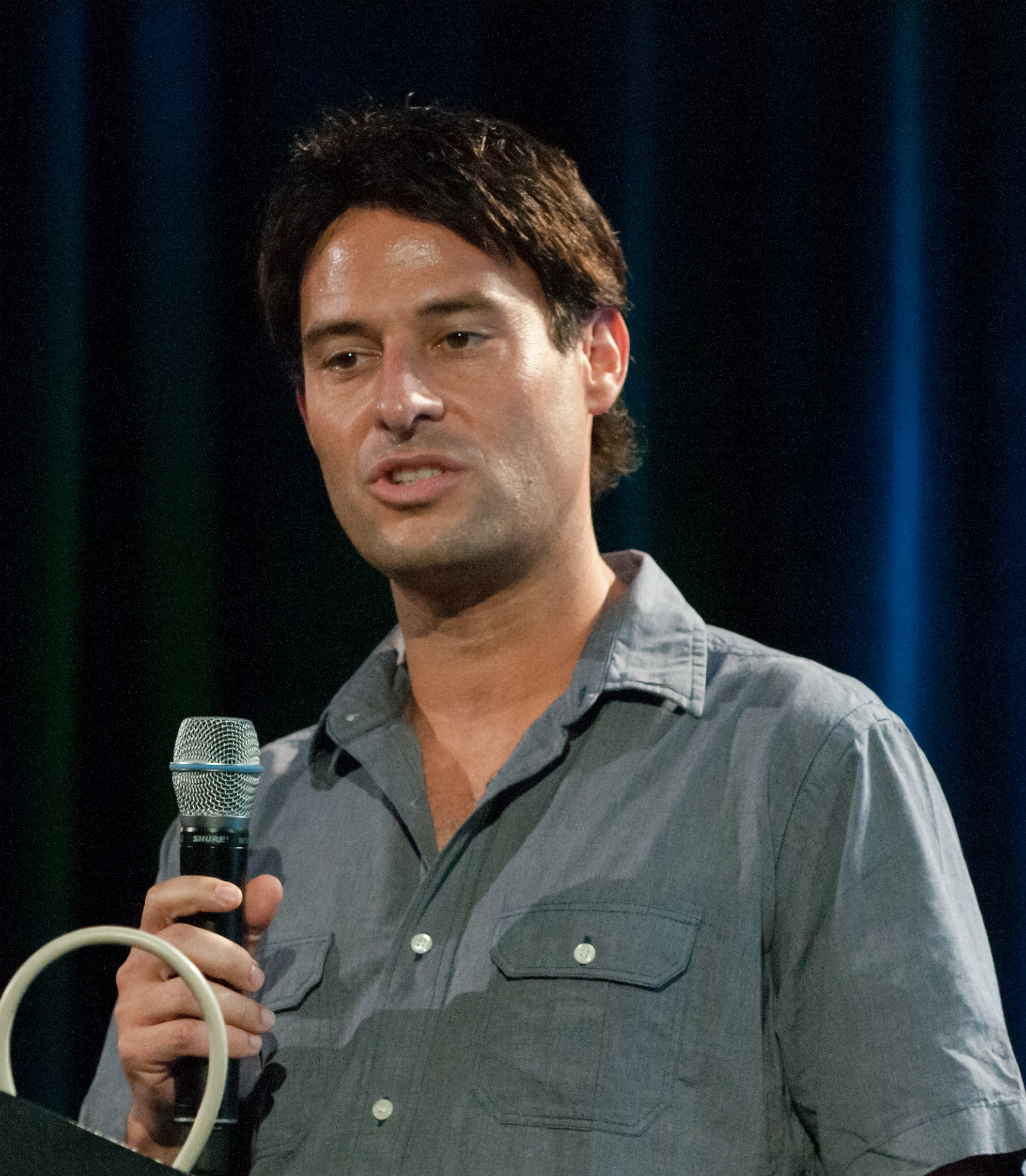
- Born: Richard Marc Rosenblatt; April 6, 1969 (age 57); Woodland Hills, California, U.S.
- Education: University of California, Los Angeles (BA); University of Southern California (JD)
- Occupations: entrepreneur, lawyer
- Spouse: Lisa Rosenblatt

Richard Marc Rosenblatt (born April 6, 1969) is an American entrepreneur. He built, operated, and sold over US$3.3 billion of Internet media and content-aggregation companies. Formerly the chairman and CEO of Demand Media, Rosenblatt left the company on October 14, 2013, and currently serves as founder, chairman and CEO of Whip Media. He is also the co-founder and chairman of Autograph.

== Early life ==
Rosenblatt was born in Woodland Hills, California, United States, and was raised in Southern California by his physicist father, Martin, and mother Jane, who was a Health Sciences professor. Rosenblatt went on to earn a B.A. from UCLA, and a J.D. from the University of Southern California Law School (class of 1994). After graduating from law school, Rosenblatt took a job at Brobeck, Phleger & Harrison, in Los Angeles, but quit after six months, citing boredom.

== Career ==
=== iMALL ===
In October 1994, Rosenblatt co-founded iMALL and served as head of internet media and web development. iMALL's products included a suite of tools to build e-commerce stores and transact commerce over the internet. Rosenblatt replaced one of the founders, Craig Pickering, as CEO in July 1996 and took on the additional role of chairman of the board in January 1997. Rosenblatt oversaw the restructuring and rebuilding of the business. In 1998, iMALL partnered up with First Data Merchant Services (FDMS) in a deal that provided access to roughly 2 million merchants and included a $14 million equity stake in iMALL. In April 1999, Verio, Inc. teamed up with iMALL and First Data to create VerioStore, a product selling e-commerce services. Later that same year, IBM bought iMALL and First Data's technology for their e-commerce services. In July 1999, Rosenblatt negotiated the sale of iMALL to Excite@Home for $565 million. In 1999, iMALL and two of its founders were sued by the Federal Trade Commission, though Rosenblatt was not among those named in the suit. Rosenblatt became the Sr. VP of e-commerce for Excite@Home for a short period of time.

=== Great Domains ===
Following iMALL's sale, Rosenblatt became the founding investor and vice chairman of Great Domains. The company became a leader in the secondary domain market and was acquired by VeriSign, Inc. in October 2000 for $100 million.

=== DrKoop.com ===
In August 2000, Rosenblatt became the interim CEO of the ailing DrKoop.com. His participation was part of a larger effort by investors to reconfigure the business into a hybrid online and offline venture that was structured to be less dependent on the erratic flow of advertising dollars. The turn-around was nearly complete when the Internet market collapsed and 9/11 occurred, causing the company to file for bankruptcy in December 2001.

=== Superdudes.net ===
Rosenblatt became CEO of Superdudes.net, an online gaming community where users created their own Superhero character and participated in global social networking in 2002.

=== Intermix Media and Myspace ===
In February 2004, Rosenblatt became CEO of Intermix Media (formerly eUniverse, Inc.), where he led the growth of Myspace.com from an unknown website into a popular Internet property. In 2005, Intermix was sold to News Corporation for US$649 million, $580 million of which was cash, with an additional $69 million paid to private shareholders.

In 2005, former New York Attorney General Eliot Spitzer filed a lawsuit against Intermix, but Rosenblatt was not among those named in the suit. Spitzer accused the company of installing advertising software without notifying unsuspecting consumers. Intermix acknowledged Spitzer's allegation, but stated that it was part of an outdated practice put in place by previous leadership, and the company no longer installed software without first notifying the customer. The case against Intermix was later settled for a monetary sum, though there was no admission of guilt. The founder and former CEO of Intermix Media Inc., Brad Greenspan, was fined US$750,000 as part of an agreement with Spitzer to end the investigation against him.

In 2006, Greenspan filed a lawsuit against Intermix, claiming the executives and directors, Rosenblatt among them, withheld key information from shareholders regarding the potential revenue generated by the sale of Intermix to News Corp. Greenspan specifically said the sale cheated shareholders by not including the growth potential of MySpace.com in the agreed upon sales figure. The case was dismissed on Friday, October 6, 2006, when Judge Carolyn Kuhl determined that shareholders of Intermix Media, Inc. had been lawfully informed prior to voting on the transaction. On August 1, 2008, a judge ordered that one count could proceed in the class action shareholder suit brought against the Intermix executives

=== Demand Media ===
Rosenblatt then co-founded Demand Media with private-equity executive Colo. The company launched in May 2006 with US$120 million in equity and announced the acquisitions of eNom, Inc. and eHow.com. By March 2008, Demand Media raised the total amount of equity to US$355 million. In January 2008, Demand Media partnered with Lance Armstrong and the (LAF) to build the daily health, lifestyle and fitness website, Livestrong.com. Demand Media completed its IPO in January 2011 with a 33% increase in price on its first day of trading and market value of over $2 billion. Demand Media's board announced Rosenblatt's resignation from both the chairman and CEO roles in an October 14, 2013 news release that also included Rosenblatt's response: "I realize that all journeys must ultimately come to an end and want to wish Shawn and the entire team success as they continue to grow the business."

=== Whip Media ===
In 2014, Rosenblatt joined as CEO of Whipclip, a startup offering a legalized way to share TV clips. The startup expanded by partnering with notable TV channels and record labels to make and share TV and music video clips. It acquired French startup TVShow Time in May 2017 and rebranded as TV Time. TV Time later acquired content value management platform, Mediamorph, to become Whip Media Group.

=== Autograph and other ventures ===
In 2021, Rosenblatt co-founded Autograph with NFL quarterback Tom Brady and serves as the chairman of the company. Autograph is an experience-driven NFT platform to create digital collectibles.

Rosenblatt was on the board of FRS and iCrossing, Inc, now acquired by Hearst. He was the owner of nightclubs named Air Conditioned but sold it to his partner, Gary John Collins. He sits on the boards of Cameo, DraftKings and Imagine Entertainment.

Rosenblatt is a co-lecturer with Peter Guber under UCLA's MBA program for the course, "New Media: The Convergence of the Poet and the Engineer." He was USC Entrepreneur of the Year 2008.

== Recognition ==
Rosenblatt was USC Entrepreneur of the Year 2008. He was recognized as one of The 50 Smartest People in Tech by Fortune magazine and one of the Most Admired CEOs by Los Angeles Business Journal.

== Philanthropy ==
In June 2010, Rosenblatt was associated with "several philanthropic organizations," including the Floor Members Outreach Program, the NYSE Fallen Heroes Fund, and, the NYSE Foundation.

== Personal life ==
Rosenblatt is married to his wife of 28 years, Lisa Rosenblatt. In 2011, he purchased a US$26 million Tuscan mansion located in Brentwood, Los Angeles.
