= Tom Anderson =

American internet entrepreneur (born 1970)

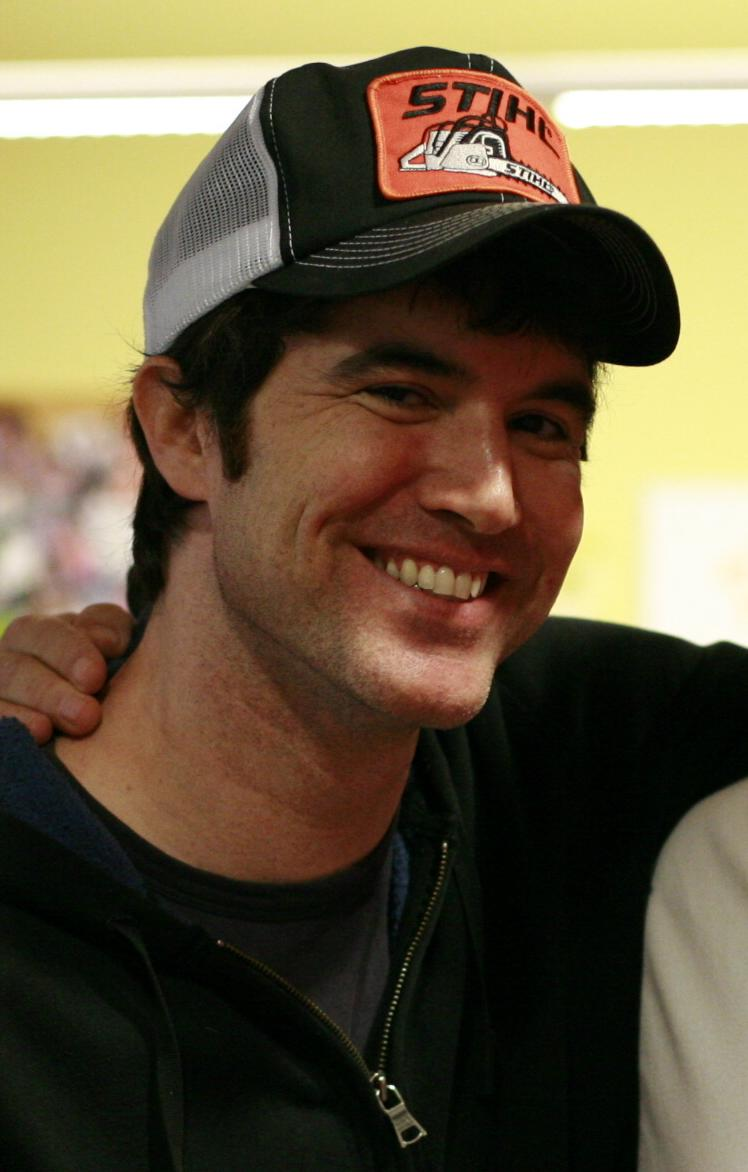
- Anderson in 2008
- Born: Thomas Anderson; November 8, 1970 (age 55); San Diego, California, U.S.
- Education: University of California, Berkeley; University of California, Los Angeles
- Occupation: Internet entrepreneur
- Known for: Co-founder of Myspace

Thomas Anderson (born November 8, 1970) is an American technology entrepreneur and co-founder of the social networking website Myspace, which he founded in 2003 with Chris DeWolfe. He was later president of Myspace and a strategic adviser for the company. Anderson is popularly known as "Tom from Myspace", "Myspace Tom", or "My friend, Tom" because he would automatically be assigned as the first "friend" of new Myspace users upon the creation of their profiles.

== Early life ==
Anderson's father was an entrepreneur. As a teenager at San Pasqual High in Escondido, California, Anderson was a computer hacker under the pseudonym "Lord Flathead" (friends with Bill Landreth), and prompted a Federal Bureau of Investigation (FBI) raid after he hacked into a computer system at Chase Manhattan Bank.

Anderson attended the University of California, Berkeley, majoring in English and rhetoric, prior to becoming the lead singer of a band called Swank. Anderson then lived in Taiwan after graduation, before returning to the United States to study film at the University of California, Los Angeles.

== Career ==
Anderson was a product tester and copywriter at XDrive, a digital storage company, in 2000, where he first met DeWolfe. He initially joined XDrive as a product tester after answering a flyer advertisement, while still at film school and looking to earn extra money. After XDrive went bankrupt in 2001, he and DeWolfe founded the direct marketing company ResponseBase. They sold ResponseBase to Brad Greenspan's eUniverse in late 2002.

With other eUniverse employees, Anderson set up the first pages of Myspace in August 2003. He founded the site partly as a reaction to Friendster and its policy of blocking accounts that did not use real names. Intermix Media was then founded as the successor of eUniverse, and it was under Intermix that Myspace garnered the level of popularity for which it is notable. When Intermix Media and Myspace were sold to News Corp, Anderson became president of the company.

Myspace was sold to News Corp in 2005 for $580 million. Following the News Corp acquisition, Anderson said: "Before [the acquisition], I could do whatever I wanted. Now it takes more time to get people to agree on things. All the budget reviews and processes. That can be a pain. But it's not stopping us." Reuters quoted an unnamed News Corp executive as saying: "Tom [Anderson] was responsible for the product, but ended up being a complete bottleneck on getting things done." Anderson was replaced as president in April 2009 by News Corp; by 2010, he was no longer the default friend on Myspace, and was replaced by a profile called "Today On MySpace", or "T.O.M."

In late May 2012, Anderson announced that he would be joining RocketFrog Interactive as an adviser to the 16-person Los Angeles-based company, which created a Facebook app. However, in a September 2014 interview, he explained that he is not interested in returning to his previous vocation. "I'll never say 'never' because, more than anything, I like the idea that anything can happen. I don't know exactly where my life will lead. Adventure and the unknown has always been appealing to me."

== Personal life ==
Anderson is active on other social media platforms, including Facebook and Instagram. Following an experience with photography at the 2011 Burning Man festival, Anderson's interest in his own photography was piqued. In a September 2014 ABC News interview, Anderson credited friend and photographer Trey Ratcliff for facilitating his skill development and explained: "I'm not necessarily trying to represent nature exactly. I'm trying to make something beautiful like a painter would." Anderson travels globally with friends to locations such as Thailand and Myanmar, where he primarily focuses upon landscape images.

Anderson also explained in September 2014 that his personal interests have always been diverse:

If you knew me before Myspace, you'd probably thought I'd have been a scholar teaching philosophy in a university my whole life. If you met me before college, you'd probably have thought I'd be a musician for my entire life ... I like change.
