= Victoria (dinosaur) =

Specimen of the species Tyrannosaurus rex

- Common name: Victoria
- Species: Tyrannosaurus rex
- Age: about 67 million years
- Place discovered: Faith, South Dakota, U.S.
- Date discovered: 2013

Victoria is a specimen of the species Tyrannosaurus rex recognized for its well-preserved and nearly complete skeleton, making it the second most complete T. rex finds in recent history. Victoria got her name in the lab in Victoria, British Columbia, where it was studied and restored.

Victoria was unearthed outside Faith, South Dakota, in 2013 over eight months by researchers. She was prepared and restored by the team at Pangea Fossils in Victoria, British Columbia.

Victoria is estimated at the age of around 18–25 at the time of her death 65 million years ago. Her skeleton includes approximately 199 bones and nearly complete skull, accounting for about 65% of the total skeleton, making her the second most complete T. rex skeleton discovered to date (behind “Sue” for completeness). Victoria stands as one of the largest T.rex’s mounted in the world at 40 feet in length and was estimated to be approximately 10.5 tons or 21,000 lbs. at death.

Heinrich Mallison, Victoria’s lead paleontologist and researcher at the Center of Natural History, Hamburg University said, “The discovery of Victoria has provided the paleontological community with a tremendous amount of new information. The various insights gleaned from her unique and groundbreaking pathologies will be the subject of research for years to come” and “From a bite on her jaw that led to an unusually widespread infection to an absorbed tooth in the maxilla.

== Pathologies ==
Some of the notable pathologies include:

- Severe bite mark on the lower jaw, which led to a massive mouth infection that spread to both jaws.
- Small infection on the left dentary showing scarring.
- Fused middle neck vertebrae (Cervical #6, 7, 8): this would have meant she suffered severe neck trauma, such as a broken neck or a severe strain which would have caused the vertebrae to fuse together while healing.
- Teeth pathologies: absorbed tooth in the maxilla (only seen before in one other theropod).
- Two teeth growing out of the same alveoli (never seen before).
- Small unidentified pathologies on the scapula, coracoid, nasal and ribs.

== Exhibitions ==
Victoria has exhibited since 2019 at the Houston Science Center, the Arizona Science Center, and a stand-alone exhibition in Korea. Melbourne Museum will unveil Victoria on June 28, 2024. Visitors to the exhibit will be able to see her complete skeleton, see simulations of her as a predator, protector and mother and will also hear what she might have sounded like.

Victoria is owned by Aber Whitcomb, a co-founder of MySpace.

== See also ==
- Big John (dinosaur)
- Black Beauty (dinosaur)
- Jane (dinosaur)
- Specimens of Tyrannosaurus
- Stan (dinosaur)
- Timeline of tyrannosaur research
- Trix (dinosaur)
