= Jam City (company) =

American video game developer

Jam City, Inc.
- Formerly: Platform G (2010); MindJolt (2010–2012); Social Gaming Network (2012–2016)
- Type: Subsidiary
- Industry: Video games
- Founded: 2010; 16 years ago
- Founders: Chris DeWolfe; Colin Digiaro; Aber Whitcomb; Josh Yguado
- Headquarters: Culver City, California, US
- Key people: Josh Yguado (CEO); SeungWon Lee (executive chairman)
- Owner: Netmarble (minority stake)
- Number of employees: 825 (2021)
- Subsidiaries: TinyCo
- Website: jamcity.com

Jam City, Inc. (formerly MindJolt and Social Gaming Network) is an American video game developer and publisher based in Culver City, California. The company was founded in 2010 by Chris DeWolfe, Colin Digiaro, Aber Whitcomb, and Josh Yguado. Jam City has nine studios located in the United States, Canada, South America, and Europe. As of 2021, it employs 825 people. Netmarble is the largest shareholder in Jam City. As of 2021, Jam City's games have 31 million monthly active users and 1.3 billion total downloads.

== History ==
Jam City was founded by the Myspace co-founders Chris DeWolfe, Colin Digiaro and Aber Whitcomb, and former 20th Century Fox executive Josh Yguado. The company launched in 2010 when the co-founders raised US$28 million from Austin Ventures for their business, then called Platform G. Platform G acquired MindJolt, a social gaming platform founded by Richard Fields, in March 2010 and took its name. Fields remained with the company to lead strategy. The new MindJolt acquired Social Gaming Network (or SGN) and Hallpass Media in April 2011, which added mobile games to the company's portfolio. MindJolt renamed as SGN in March 2012. In June 2013, SGN acquired Mob Science, a developer of social games known for Legends: Rise of a Hero. The company launched the game Panda Pop in 2013, which would later become one of the highest-grossing mobile games. The match-3 puzzle game Cookie Jam launched in 2014. Cookie Jam was named Facebook's game of the year with more than 100 million downloads and 5 million active players at the time. Cookie Jam was also among the 20 highest-grossing mobile games for Google Play and the App Store.

In the wake of Cookie Jam's success, the South Korean mobile game company Netmarble invested $130 million in SGN in July 2015, becoming SGN's largest shareholder; this was one of the largest investments in mobile gaming since 2013. By the time of Netmarble's investment, SGN games had been downloaded 500 million times. Following Netmarble's investment, SGN bought the developers Fat Rascal Games and Kiwi Inc. in late 2015, followed by TinyCo in July 2016. The latter acquisition raised SGN's staff count from 125 to 400. Mobile entertainment games that TinyCo had created include Family Guy: The Quest for Stuff and Marvel Avengers Academy. SGN rebranded as Jam City in September 2016, the same year Genies & Gems, a match-3 puzzle game, was launched.

On April 25, 2018, Jam City released Harry Potter: Hogwarts Mystery, a mobile game based on J. K. Rowling's Wizarding World franchise. Within its first day, the game was ranked first on the App Store's free-to-play category and reached tenth place on the list of top-grossing games across categories. It was the fastest of Jam City's games to reach $100 million in revenue, generating $110 million in its first year. By October 2019, it had been downloaded 54.6 million times. The game was nominated for Best Breakthrough Game during the 2019 Google Play Awards.

Jam City bought the intellectual property, management, and development team of Bingo Pop from Uken Games in November 2018, expanding geographically into Toronto, Canada. Also in 2018, Jam City and Disney reached a multi-year deal for Jam City to develop licensed games based on stories and characters from Disney and Pixar. As part of that deal, Jam City took over the game Disney Emoji Blitz. Jam City's first new game under its deal with Disney was Frozen Adventures based on the Frozen and Frozen 2 films, which launched the next year.

Jam City announced in January 2019 that it raised US$145 million in funding from JPMorgan Chase Bank, Bank of America Merrill Lynch, and others to support Jam City's acquisitions and global growth initiatives. Jam City acquired Berlin-based studio 231 Play in April. DeWolfe told GamesBeat that the acquisition of studios in Toronto and Berlin allowed Jam City to expand into more game genres, such as solitaire, mahjong, and bingo. According to analytics provider Sensor Tower, solitaire, mahjong, and bingo games ranked among Jam City's top games as of February 2021. By mid-2020, Jam City's valuation was estimated at greater than $2 billion.

On May 20, 2021, Jam City announced it would become a public company through a merger with DPCM Capital Inc., a special-purpose acquisition company. The merger valued Jam City at $1.2 billion, including debt. The merger was expected to close later in 2021. Through the deal, Jam City was also able to acquire video game developer Ludia, which made games based on the Jurassic World franchise, for $165 million in September. However, the plans to go public were canceled due market conditions in July 2021. In August 2022, Jam City laid off 150–200 people (17% of its headcount), primarily affecting Ludia. DeWolfe and Whitcomb resigned from the company in January 2023 to establish Plai Labs. In their place, Jam City moved Yguado into the CEO role and appointed Netmarble's chairman, SeungWon Lee, as the executive chairman.

In August 2024, it was reported that am had laid off 85 workers, a 10 percent cut to its workforce, after "lower-than-expected" performances from games like Lovelink and Jurassic World Alive. In March 2025, it was announced that Ludia had been sold after receiving an unsolicited offer from a group of Canadian investors. About 130 employees were included in the sale.

== Selected games ==
Most of the games Jam City produces are free-to-play and use microtransactions for players to obtain in-game items or abilities that speed up progression. Jam City's stated business goals include creating high-quality games that generate revenue for years. Jam City's games include both original and licensed intellectual property.

In 2017, Jam City had 50 million monthly active users and it had seven games that have ranked in the 100 highest-grossing charts in the Apple App Store. The company had 31 million monthly active users and 1.3 billion total game downloads in 2021.

Year	Title	Platform(s)	Notes	Ref.
2013	Panda Pop	Android, iOS		
2013	Bingo Pop	Android, iOS	Originally developed by Uken Games; acquired by Jam City in 2018	
2014	Cookie Jam + Cookie Jam Blast	Android, iOS		
2014	Book of Life: Sugar Smash	Android, iOS	Partnership with Fox and based on the film The Book of Life. This was Jam City's first collaboration with a major Hollywood studio to release a game simultaneously with a film	
2014	Family Guy: The Quest for Stuff	Android, iOS	Licensed game based on the Family Guy animated sitcom; originally developed by TinyCo	
2016	Disney Emoji Blitz	Android, iOS	Originally developed by Disney Games; license acquired by Jam City in 2018	
2016	Genies & Gems	Android, iOS		
2017	Futurama: Worlds of Tomorrow	Android, iOS	Licensed game based on the Futurama series	
2017	Snoopy Pop	Android, iOS	Licensed game based on the Peanuts comic strip	
2017	Family Guy: Another Freakin' Mobile Game	Android, iOS	Licensed game based on Family Guy	
2018	Harry Potter: Hogwarts Mystery	Android, iOS	Licensed game based on Harry Potter franchise	
2018	Wild Things: Animal Adventures	Android, iOS		
2019	Disney Frozen Adventures	Android, iOS	Licensed game based on the Frozen franchise	
2019	Vineyard Valley	Android, iOS		
2020	World War Doh	Android, iOS		
2025	Disney Magic Match 3D	Android, iOS		

== Products and collaborations ==
Jam City released a monetization tool, AdJolt, in November 2010. It was made available to third-party developers, who would share revenue generated through AdJolt with MindJolt. In December 2012, Jam City launched MasterKey, which enabled the company to develop cross-platform games without creating separate versions for each platform. MasterKey was described as being technology that "essentially works like a translator or convertor".

In December 2014, SGN and Chinese internet technology company NetEase announced a partnership that enabled Cookie Jam to be distributed in China beginning in early 2015.
