= Chris DeWolfe =

American technology entrepreneur

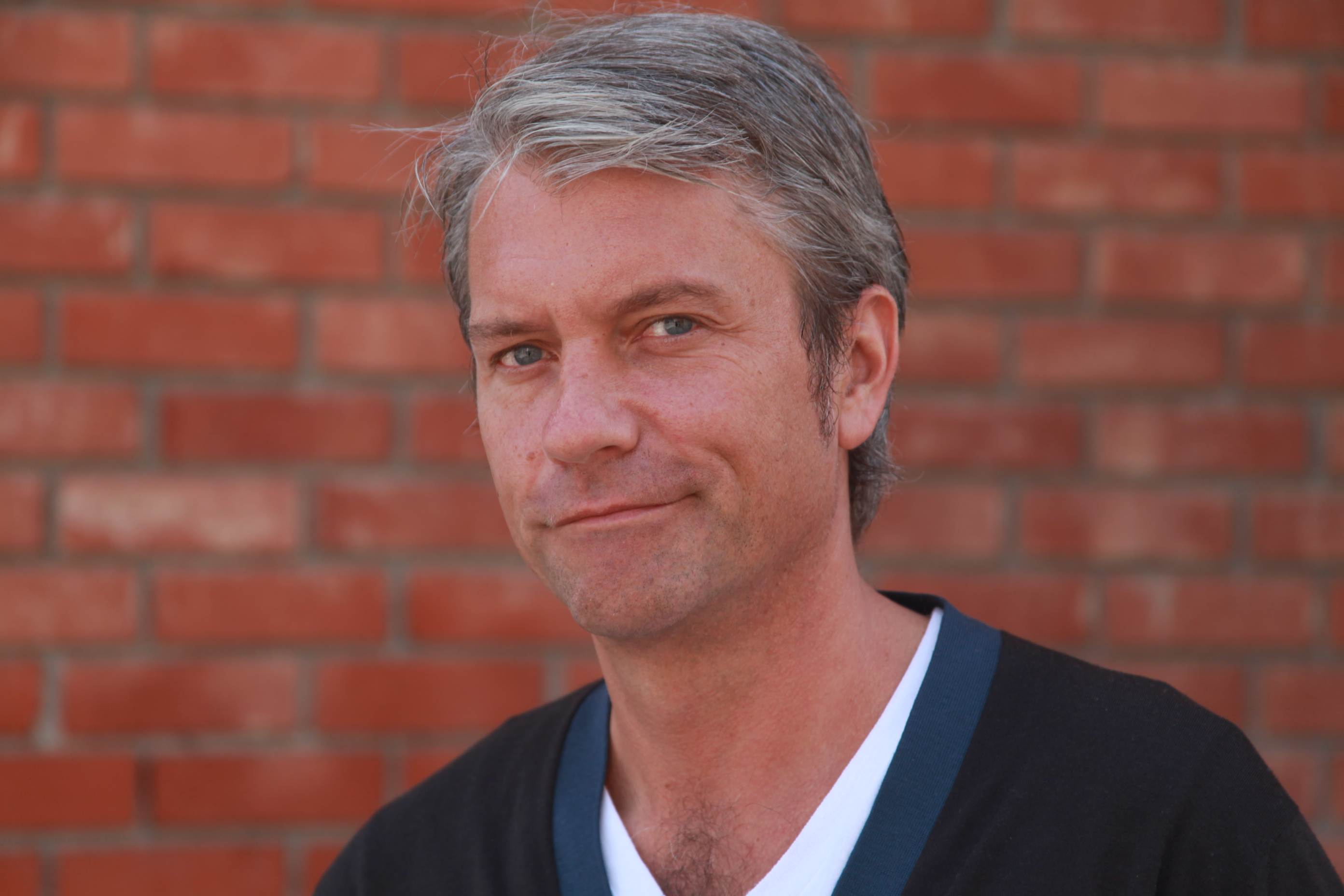
- DeWolfe in 2012
- Born: 1965 or 1966 (age 60–61); Portland, Oregon, U.S.
- Education: University of Washington (B.A., 1988); University of Southern California (MBA, 1997)
- Occupation: CEO of Jam City
- Known for: Co-founder of Myspace

Chris DeWolfe (born 1965 or 1966) is an American technology entrepreneur. He co-founded Myspace in 2003 and was its chief executive officer (CEO) until 2009. DeWolfe has been the CEO of Jam City, a video game developer, since he co-founded it in 2010.

== Early life and education ==
DeWolfe is a native of Portland, Oregon, and went to Lincoln High School. DeWolfe graduated with a B.A. from the University of Washington in 1988, then completed an MBA at the USC Marshall School of Business in 1997. He was honored by the school as Alumni Entrepreneur of the Year in 2006.

== Career ==
=== Myspace ===
DeWolfe conceived Myspace while taking a course titled "The Impact of Tech on Media and Entertainment" during the final year of his MBA program. In the final project for his class, DeWolfe created "Sitegeist", which had elements of Citysearch and Match.com mixed with instant messaging. DeWolfe got an "A" on his project and used it as inspiration in creating Myspace. He co-founded Myspace in 2003.

DeWolfe was involved with the sale of Myspace to News Corporation in 2005 for US$580 million, and remained as its chief executive officer (CEO) until March 2009, at which point Myspace was larger than its competitor, Facebook. During DeWolfe's tenure, Myspace grew to attract over 135 million worldwide visitors a month. On April 22, 2009, News Corporation announced that DeWolfe would step down as CEO to become a strategic adviser and serve on the board of Myspace China. Former Facebook executive Owen Van Natta replaced him.

=== Jam City ===
DeWolfe is a co-founder and the CEO of Jam City, a Los Angeles-based video game developer. The inspiration for Jam City came during DeWolfe’s days at Myspace. In a 2006 trip DeWolfe made to Japan, he met with SoftBank Group founder Masayoshi Son, where the two discussed gaming and the potential of mobile gaming. The social nature of games and the fast growth of mobile gaming in countries like Japan inspired him to start Jam City. DeWolfe founded Jam City in 2010 with former 20th Century Fox executive Josh Yguado and former Myspace executives Colin Digiaro and Aber Whitcomb when they received backing from Austin Ventures to buy the gaming startup MindJolt. Under DeWolfe's leadership, Jam City has grown to more than 825 employees and nine studios, as of May 2021. Its games, which include Harry Potter: Hogwarts Mystery, Cookie Jam, Panda Pop, Disney Emoji Blitz, and Family Guy: The Quest for Stuff, have been downloaded 1.3 billion times and Jam City reached a deal to become a public company through a merger with DPCM Capital Inc., with a $1.2 billion valuation.

== Accolades ==
In 2006, DeWolfe was named one of Time's 100 most influential people in the world. In 2007, he was chosen by Barbara Walters as one of her 10 most fascinating people and he won the Producers Guild of America's Vanguard Award in 2009.

== Other roles ==
DeWolfe is an investor in the travel site Gogobot. He served on the board of trustees of the Los Angeles County Museum of Art and is on the board of directors for Woven Digital.

== Personal life ==
DeWolfe lives in Los Angeles. He has two children.
