= Jam City (disambiguation) =

Jam City is a musician and disc jockey.

Jam City may also refer to:

- Jam City (company), mobile game producer
- Jam (town), a city in Iran
