= Anti-Facebook =

Anti-Facebook may refer to:

- Criticism of Facebook
- Social networking services describing themselves as the "anti-Facebook":
  - MeWe, founded in 2012
  - Minds, founded in 2011
