= Crakmedia Network =

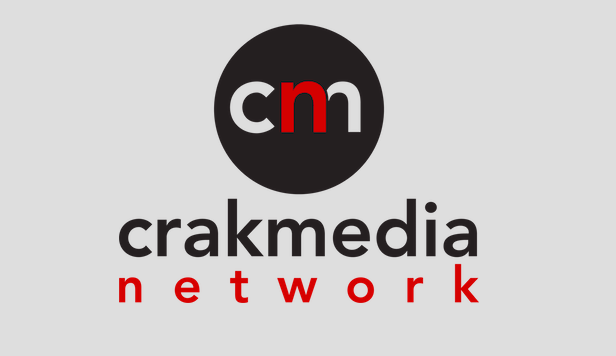
- Industry: Online advertising
- Founded: 2006
- Founder: Nicolas Chrétien, Xavier Farooghi, Frédéric Hains
- Headquarters: Quebec City, Canada

Crakmedia Network is a Canadian company headquartered in Quebec City. It specializes in various Internet-related services.

== History ==
Crakmedia Network was founded by Nicolas Chrétien, Xavier Farooghi, and Frédéric Hains in 2006. Chrétien, Farooghi, and Hains had also created a humor site in 2004. After refusing a company purchase offer from Brad Greenspan, they attempted to develop the site into a video sharing platform before eventually focusing on traffic monetization and programming their own statistics and advertising campaign management tool.

Crakmedia Network moved to a new office in the Saint-Roch district of Quebec City in 2014. It collaborated with architectural firm Parka on the new office's layout.

In 2015, Farooghi decided to step down from his position at Crakmedia Network, and Chrétien purchased his shares in the company. By 2016, the company had 17,000 affiliate customers, with 98% of the company’s business coming from abroad.

Crakmedia was ranked 31st in Deloitte’s Canadian Technology Fast 50 and 242nd in its Technology Fast 500 list in 2015.

In 2018, the company won the SME of the year at the Mercuriades gala from Federation of Quebec Chambers of Commerce.

Crakmedia partnered with the Centre Durocher community center to provide Christmas gifts to underprivileged children in Lower Town Quebec in 2021.

== Patent lawsuit and controversy ==
In 2014, Essociate, Inc. filed a patent infringement lawsuit against Crakmedia Network, alleging that Crakmedia Network's internet advertising system infringed upon Essociate's ‘660 Patent. Essociate had also sued companies such as Clickbooth for infringement of this patent. In 2015, the U.S. District Court for the Central District of California ruled in favor of Crakmedia Network, invalidating Essociate's patent based on Alice Corp. v. CLS Bank.

== Awards ==
Crakmedia was a finalist for the 2015 Prix Rayonnement hors Québec at Fidéides.

Crakmedia was also named one of L'Actualité’s 2015 Leaders, ranked as the 6th-fastest growing company in Quebec. It was also named a Leader by L'Actualité in 2016, ranked as the 16th -fastest- growing company in Quebec.

Crakmedia was a finalist for the 2016 Mercuriades Awards in the category “Contribution to Economic and Regional Development - Large Company.”
