= Myspace IM =

Discontinued instant messaging client for Myspace

MySpace IM
- Developer: Myspace
- Stable release: 1.0.823.0 / December 1, 2009; 16 years ago
- Operating system: Windows
- Type: Instant messaging client
- License: Freeware
- Website: MySpaceIM page (archive)

MyspaceIM was the official instant messaging client for the social networking site MySpace.

In 2009, a web-based client dubbed MySpaceIM for Web was released to all English-speaking countries, allowing users to interact with friends and non-friends alike to grow their network. Both the desktop and web-based clients can be used to communicate between friends over a common IM network.

== Features ==
MySpaceIM integrates several features into the IM. Currently, these are the features included:

- Basic instant messaging to other Myspace users.
- Shortcuts to Myspace.com features and profiles.
- Imports friends from Myspace into your contacts list in MySpaceIM.
- Instant alerts for all requests, messages, and comments.
- Switchable conversation views, such as: traditional IM, with pictures, or with cartoon-like balloons.
- Skinnable interface.
- Shareable custom backgrounds in message windows.
- Built-in avatar picture cropping.
- Custom emoticons.
- Custom "Zaps". (Zaps is a combination of a sound bite, picture, and/or words.)
- Voice calls with MySpaceIM users and Skype native client users.
- Voice calls to and from regular phones.

== Protocol ==
MySpaceIM uses a proprietary text-based protocol developed by Myspace. Messages are sent as lists of key/value pairs, separated by backslashes. Logging in involves a challenge/response protocol using the SHA-1 hash function and RC4.

Although no official documentation is available, an unofficial MySpaceIM protocol specification has been produced as part of the effort to implement the protocol in Pidgin.

There was also a very rough .NET implementation of the MySpaceIM protocol.

== Compatibility ==
In November 2006, Cerulean Studios announced their support in MySpaceIM through the upcoming release of Trillian Astra.

In August 2007, eBuddy announced support for MySpaceIM through their beta web version.

During September 2007, the Pidgin project development team incorporated MyspaceIM support developed through work by Jeff Connelly with the Google Summer of Code. MySpaceIM support appears in the 2.2.0 release of libpurple, enabling MySpaceIM support in Pidgin v2.2.0 and Adium v1.1.3.

== Versions ==
Over time, Myspace has released several versions of MySpaceIM, listed here in reverse chronological order:

- Version 1.0.823.0 (released 12/01/2009)
- Version 1.0.804.0 (released 10/09/2009)
- Version 1.0.800.0 (released 08/27/2009)
- Version 1.0.789.0 (released 12/17/2008)
- Version 1.0.756.0 (released 04/23/2008)
- Version 1.0.754.0 (released 02/07/2008)
- Version 1.0.745.0 (released 12/19/2007)
- Version 1.0.739.0 (released 12/11/2007)
- Version 1.0.731.0 (released 11/28/2007)
- Version 1.0.716.0 (released 08/15/2007)
- Version 1.0.712.0 (released 08/??/2007)
- Version 1.0.697.0 (released 05/31/2007)
- Version 1.0.673.0 (released 03/07/2007)
- Version 1.0.595.0 (released 01/??/2007)
- Version 1.0.594.0 (released 01/09/2007)
- Version 1.0.529.0 (released 01/08/2007)
- Version 1.0.476.0 (released 10/17/2006)
- Version 1.0.458.0 (released 10/10/2006)
- Version 1.0.404.0 (released 08/25/2006)
- Version 1.0.366.0 (released 07/21/2006)
- Version 1.0.357.0
- Version 1.0.349.0 (released 07/07/2006)
- Version 1.0.337.0
- Version 1.0.331.0 (released 06/14/2006)
- Version 1.0.330.0
- Version 1.0.327.0 (released 06/07/2006)
- Version 1.0.318.0 (released 06/06/2006)
- Version 1.0.312.0
- Version 1.0.306.0
- Version 1.0.302.0 (released 05/28/2006)
- Version 1.0.281.0 (released 05/20/2006)
- Version 1.0.269.0 (released 05/18/2006)
- Version 1.0.265.0 (released 05/13/2006)
- Version 1.0.262.0 (released 05/12/2006)
- Version 1.0.253.0 (released 05/10/2006)

== See also ==
- Comparison of instant messaging clients
- Meebo
- Pidgin
