= Jeffrey Scott Edell =

American entrepreneur

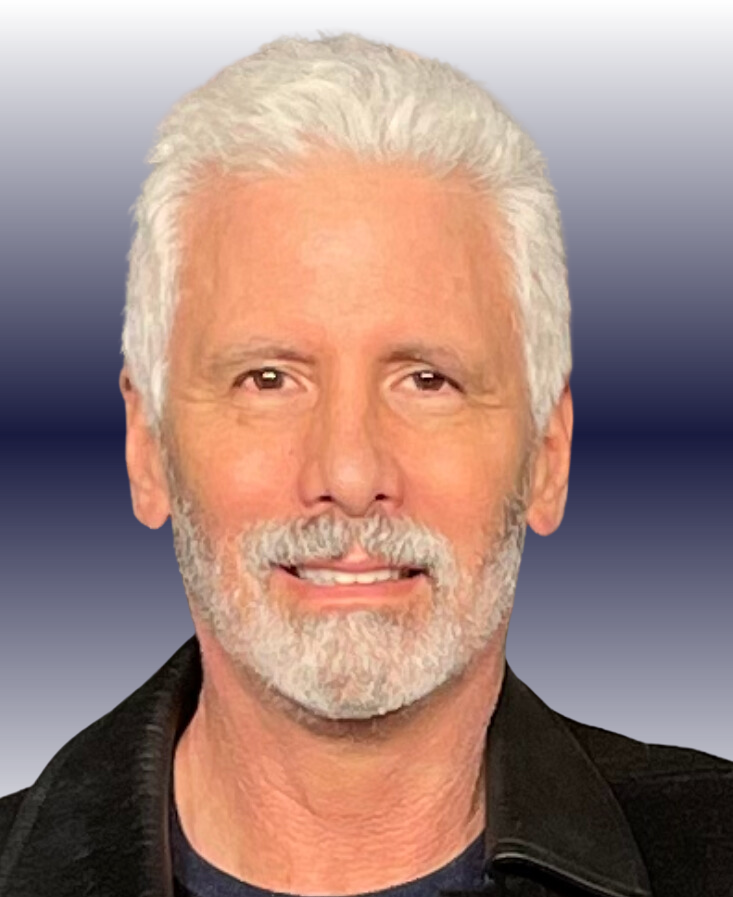
- Education: McIntire School of Commerce, University of Virginia
- Occupations: Tech & Entertainment CEO
- Years active: 1990–present
- Organizations: Academy of Motion Picture Arts and Sciences; Academy of Television Arts and Sciences; Producers Guild of America
- Known for: MeWe; Soundelux Entertainment Group; Intermix Media (parent company of MySpace); DIC Entertainment; Inferno

Jeffrey Scott Edell is an American businessman in the entertainment, media, and technology industries. He was chief executive officer and chairman of MeWe, a Web3-oriented social networking service, from 2021 to 2025.

Edell was chief executive officer and president of Soundelux Entertainment Group, chairman of Intermix Media (the parent company of MySpace), and was chief executive officer of eLabor.com (formerly jeTECH Data Systems). He is also chief executive officer of Inferno Pictures and executive chairman of Ohana Chem Co, LLC.

Earlier in his career, he was chief financial officer of Cinedigm, president and chief operating officer of DIC Entertainment, and president and chief financial officer of WTG Entertainment Enterprises.

== Education ==
Edell attended Lehigh University to pursue a Pre-Medicine path and later transferred to the University of Virginia's McIntire School of Commerce, where he graduated with a B.S. in Commerce with an emphasis in Accounting and Taxation. He was Associate Professor at Florida State University and was Entrepreneur in Residence for the Motion Pictures Arts College from 2014 to 2016. During his time at KPMG, Edell obtained his Certified Public Accountant certification.

== Career ==
From 1995 to 2001, Edell was CEO and production executive for Soundelux Entertainment Group, overseeing films including Braveheart, Face/Off, The Mask of Zorro, Gladiator, Almost Famous, and Shrek. Starting in 2009, Edell's companies have produced films such as The Kids Are All Right, Just Friends, Killer Elite, Hachi: A Dog's Tale, and The Grey. While Edell was the chief executive officer of Soundelux, Soundelux performed work for films such as Gladiator and Braveheart, among other films, which won multiple BAFTA and Academy Awards.

Edell was a producer and actor on the 2013 Lifetime movie Taken for Ransom (originally named Life Saver) with his wife Elaine Hastings Edell, a producer for various other films, and an actor in National Lampoon's Movie Madness (formerly National Lampoon's Goes to the Movies). In 2019, Edell was a producer of the thriller film Deadly Excursion (Paradise Prey). He also was co-executive producer of the 2020 animated series, The Freak Brothers, based on the comic book series of The Fabulous Furry Freak Brothers. The series was renewed for Season 2 to be released in December 2022. In May 2020, it was announced that the main characters in the series will be voiced by actors including Woody Harrelson, John Goodman, Tiffany Haddish, and Pete Davidson. In 2021, Tubi announced that The Freak Brothers was the most-watched program on the platform.

Edell is also known for overseeing and managing the development of brands such as Inspector Gadget and Strawberry Shortcake during his tenure at DIC Entertainment, as well as partnering with Stan Lee and POW! Entertainment on a game, Stan Lee's Superhero Ball Wars. Edell was interviewed by journalist Julia Angwin in her 2009 book Stealing MySpace: The Battle to Control the Most Popular Website in America because of his role as chairman of Intermix Media. Edell was also interviewed in 2022 by David Ryan Polgar on the All Tech Is Human podcast, which promotes the Responsible Tech field.

Edell's tenure at Soundelux garnered him recognition as Nasdaq and Ernst and Young's ‘Entertainment Entrepreneur of the Year' in 2000 and admission to both the Academy of Motion Picture Arts and Sciences, and the Academy of Television Arts and Sciences. He is a member of the Producers Guild of America and the Young Presidents Organization, and a contributing member of the Rolling Stones Culture Council.

He has held executive positions including chairman of Intermix Media (former parent company of MySpace), CEO of Inferno Pictures, CFO of Cinedigm, and president and COO of DIC Entertainment. In these roles he worked across digital media, production, and entertainment ventures.

=== ^{MeWe} ===
In April 2021, Edell was appointed chief executive officer of MeWe, a privacy-focused social networking service that operates without advertising. At the time of his appointment, he also joined the company’s board of directors, while MeWe founder Mark Weinstein assumed the role of chief evangelist.

During Edell’s tenure, MeWe promoted itself as operating under a “privacy bill of rights”, stating that users retain control over their personal data, news feeds and privacy settings. The company’s advisory board included Tim Berners-Lee, the inventor of the World Wide Web. In 2021, MeWe reported more than 17 million registered members, with a substantial proportion of its users located outside North America, and operated a subscription-based premium service in addition to a free tier.

In 2022, Edell was interviewed for the All Tech Is Human podcast, discussing MeWe’s focus on privacy-first social networking and the platform’s role in the broader tech landscape.

As CEO of MeWe Edell led the platform through strategic development, including raising significant funding and presenting the company’s vision for user migration to Web3 at events such as Polkadot Decoded 2023, where he outlined plans for decentralised social media networks.

As CEO of MeWe, Edell orchestrated a $27 million Series A round led by private company McCourt Global, which contributed $15 million. Previous investors contributed another $12 million—the round values MeWe at approximately $200 million.

=== Comic Collection and Heritage Auctions ===
As a collector and dealer, Edell’s portfolio has included high‑grade key issues and historically significant comic books that have ranked among notable sales in the hobby. These holdings have comprised a CGC 8.5 pedigree copy of Amazing Fantasy #15, featuring the first appearance of Spider‑Man; one of the highest graded known copies of Amazing Spider‑Man #1 (CGC 9.6 grade); a CGC 9.0 graded Fantastic Four #1; and a CGC 7.5 graded Incredible Hulk #1. Edell’s activities in the comics market have involved the sale of many of these iconic Marvel key issues, including first appearances and headline‑making pedigree copies, often through major auction houses such as Heritage Auctions.

== Views and opinions ==
Edell has criticised advertising-driven social media business models, arguing that platforms that monetise user data and rely on surveillance capitalism treat people as products rather than as individuals. He has stated that social media should “connect people, not harvest them” and that MeWe offers an alternative by not tracking or selling user data.

He has argued that privacy and user control should be central priorities for social networks, emphasising that decentralised models and subscription-oriented platforms can give users more control over their data, newsfeeds and online interaction, rather than relying on algorithms that manipulate user attention.

== Filmography ==
| Year | Title | Role | Ref. |
|---|---|---|---|
| 1982 | Movie Madness | Actor | |
| 1995 | Braveheart | Production Executive | |
| 1997 | Face/Off | Production Executive | |
| 1998 | The Mask of Zorro | Production Executive | |
| 2000 | Almost Famous | Production Executive | |
| 2000 | Gladiator | Production Executive | |
| 2000 | True Rights | Co-Producer | |
| 2001 | Shrek | Production Executive | |
| 2009 | Hachi: A Dog's Tale | Production Executive | |
| 2010 | The Kids Are All Right | Production Executive | |
| 2011 | Dirty Little Trick | Executive Producer | |
| 2011 | The Grey | Production Executive | |
| 2011 | Killer Elite | Production Executive | |
| 2013 | Final Recourse (Taken for Ransom) | Producer & Actor | |
| 2019 | Deadly Excursion (Paradise Prey) | Producer | |
| 2020-2021 | The Freak Brothers (TV show) | Co-Executive Producer | |
