= MyDeathSpace =

Online memorial forum

MyDeathSpace is a website that was founded to record the deaths of MySpace users.

Patterson stated that he intends to donate money from advertising to the National Institute of Mental Health and Mothers Against Drunk Driving.

== History ==
The site was founded by Mike Patterson, a paralegal who got the idea after reading an article about the murder of Alexa and Tessa Richards who were murdered along with their mother, Nichole Richards by their father Anthony Richards on 17 August 2005. Following their deaths, he found their MySpace pages which gave him the idea to build a web site to catalog deceased MySpace users.

The site began as a message board in August/September 2005 tracking all MySpace users who had passed away. MyDeathSpace.com was launched in January 2006.

== Controversies ==
MyDeathSpace has been criticised by some of the relatives of the deceased who claim that it is a breach of privacy and has been accused of glorifying death on the other hand other relatives have expressed gratitude that the site exists. The site has also led witch hunts against people accused of committing crimes. In one instance, a woman who shared the same name as a girl who killed her baby by putting it in a freezer had her profile linked and received hateful comments including death threats.

== See also ==
- Death and the Internet
- Find a Grave
- Legacy.com
- RIP.ie

== Sources ==
- Carroll, Brian; Landry, Katie (2010). "Logging On and Letting Out: Using Online Social Networks to Grieve and to Mourn". Bulletin of Science, Technology & Society. 30: 341–349. doi:10.1177/0270467610380006.
- Giaxoglou, Korina (2019). "Sharing Small Stories of Life and Death Online: Death-writing of the Moment". European Journal of Life Writing. 9. doi:10.21827/ejlw.8.35553.
