= Whip Media =

American data brokering company

Whip Media Group
- Industry: Entertainment, technology
- Founded: 2019
- Founder: Richard Rosenblatt
- Headquarters: Santa Monica, California
- Area served: United States
- Key people: Welby Chen (CEO)
- Subsidiaries: TV Time
- Website: https://whipmedia.com/

Whip Media Group is a privately held American company that serves as a data broker selling collected personal data, while also developing enterprise software solutions for content distribution. It operates physical offices in the US, the UK, and the EU.

== Background ==
Whip Media Group is the result of a consolidation of the mergers by the parent company of TV Time, a tracking platform for user data about TV shows and films acquired by the venture in 2016; TheTVDB, a user-generated TV-related mass media database; and Mediamorph, a data tracking and content distribution company operating in the video on demand market. It was founded following the former's acquisition of the latter in October 2019.

The fast growth, in part entailed by $65 million raised venture capital financing, resulted in the increase in its workforce, growing from 35 to 155 employees from July 2018 to January 2020. In January 2020 Whip Media raised another $50 million from Eminence Capital and Raine Ventures.

On February 19, 2025, the company was acquired by Blue Torch Capital described as "a direct lend[er] to ‘companies in transition.'" The company then shut down TV Time on July 15, 2026 citing financial inability to host it sustainably.

== Leadership ==
As of its founding its CEO was Richard Rosenblatt. In June 2023, Carol Hanley was appointed CEO, succeeding Rosenblatt. In February 2025, Welby Chen replaced her in the role.
