= Meebo =

Instant messaging client

- Screenshot Meebo's homepage as of December 2011
- Website type: Instant messager, social networking service
- Founded: September 14, 2005; 21 years ago
- Headquarters: Mountain View, California, U.S.
- Owner: Google
- Founders: Sandy Jen, Elaine Wherry, Seth Sternberg
- CEO: Seth Sternberg
- Products: Community IM, Meebo Bar and Meebo Me
- Services: Meebo Messenger, Meebo Rooms
- Website: www.meebo.com
- IPv6 support: No
- Advertising: Yes
- Registration: Optional
- Users: 250 million monthly (2011)
- Launched: September 2005; 21 years ago
- Current status: Discontinued
- Native clients on: Android, BlackBerry, iOS

Meebo (often stylized as meebo) was an instant messaging and social networking service provider. It was founded in September 2005 by Sandy Jen, Seth Sternberg, and Elaine Wherry, and was based in Mountain View, California. Initially the company offered a web-based instant messenger service, extending its offer in more general online chat and even social networking directions. In June 2012, Google acquired Meebo to merge the company's staff with the Google+ developers team.

== History ==
Meebo's backend was originally written with libgaim 1.5.0. After the initial period when the project was funded exclusively by its founders, Meebo raised $100,000 as angel investments (investors included Auren Hoffman and Marc Andreessen), received $3.5 million from Sequoia in 2005, and $9 million from Draper Fisher Jurvetson in 2006.

On August 2, 2006, Meebo launched the Flash-based "Meebo Me" chat window widget for personal websites, which automatically added visitors to the site owner's Meebo Messenger contact list, offering the possibility to start a realtime chat both to site owner and visitor In May 2007, Meebo launched media-enabled chat rooms (Rooms) that can be embedded in any website page. At this point, Meebo still didn't have a revenue model.

In April 2008, Meebo secured $25 million in venture capital funding from Jafco Investment, Time Warner and KTB Investment & Securities. In December 2008, Meebo started offering a "Community IM" integration widget, which was targeted at community-oriented sites and provided Meebo's services at third-party locations. In December 2009, Community IM was replaced with "Meebo Bar", a gadget that could be integrated by third parties into their site, providing advanced chat functionality to their users.

While initially operating on web access to the instant messaging market, Meebo expanded its offerings in the increasingly popular social network services. In February 2009, Meebo added Facebook Messenger to its list of supported instant messengers.

During the rise of the new generation of smartphone operating systems, Meebo released mobile applications for all major platforms: Android, iOS and BlackBerry. In February 2010, after being among the first to launch an iPhone app, Meebo released a fully-fledged native iPhone app.

In May 2010, the original Meebo Rooms service was discontinued, and the feature was ultimately removed in October 2011. In February 2011, Meebo acquired Mindset Media advertising company to improve its ads targeting.

On June 4, 2012, Meebo announced that they had entered into an agreement to be acquired by Google. A month later, on July 11, 2012, all of Meebo's products were discontinued except for Meebo Bar, which remained operational until June 6, 2013. Meebo's staff was assigned to Google+ development.

Meebo was also used as a workaround for users to connect to their instant messaging accounts in school or office networks that blocked such applications.

== Products ==
=== Messenger ===
Meebo Messenger, Meebo's initial offering, was a browser-based instant messaging application which supported multiple IM services (Yahoo!, MSN, AIM, ICQ, MySpaceIM, Facebook Chat and Google Talk). Features of Meebo Messenger included invisible sign-on, simultaneous uniform access to multiple IM services and conversation logging. File transfer and videoconferencing features were subsequently added to the application. Notification system was also available for Windows users via a standalone installable notifier, which could also maintain user's presence. Registered Meebo users could save their login information, so that all IM connections would be automatically established upon logging into Meebo.

The application maintained a single unified contact list for all user's accounts, attributing contacts to instant messaging protocols by placing protocols' logos in front of them, although not showing contact's avatars. The application automatically dealt with contacts invitations and approvals. Social features of the messenger included online games, multi-user chat (via Meebo Rooms), currently played track name sharing and support for social networks' messaging protocols. (Albeit Meebo Messenger didn't notify of updates in social networks.)

=== Rooms ===
Meebo Rooms was an advertising-supported multi-user chat service. Meebo partnered with blip.tv, Capitol Music Group, CNET Networks, NBC Universal and others to provide readily available rooms on their websites, so that users could discuss sites' content while consuming it. Meebo Rooms were available from Meebo Messenger and via third-party social networking sites including Piczo, Revision3, RockYou, and Tagged.

Meebo Rooms supported up to 80 simultaneous participants granted a degree of control to the host, allowing to invite and ban chat participants.
