= Intermix Media =

American internet marketing company

- Creator: Brad Greenspan
- Launched: February 1999; 27 years ago Los Angeles, California, United States

Intermix Media, Inc. (AMX symbol: MIX; formerly eUniverse) is an American Internet marketing company that owned the MySpace social network.

The company is headquartered in Los Angeles, California and is a subsidiary of Fox Interactive Media, Inc.

== History ==
The company was founded in February 1999 as Entertainment Universe, Inc by Brad Greenspan.

In June 2003, after consulting with executive management for many months, Jeffrey Edell was brought on board as Chairman of eUniverse, which, in 2004, changed its name to Intermix Media, Inc.

In February 2004, Richard Rosenblatt became CEO of Intermix.

In March 2005, the company launched Grab.com, a self-publishing and social networking site that allowed users to play games online and purchase games online, write movie reviews, and view other entertainment content.

In April 2005, New York State attorney-general Eliot Spitzer filed a lawsuit alleging the company was the source of secretly installed spyware that illegally sent pop-up advertisements and other intrusions to millions of computer users. Intermix agreed to settle the suit for US$7.9 million, but did not admit culpability.

Also in 2005, Intermix was acquired by News Corporation for approximately $580 million in cash. This decision was part of News Corporation's wider strategy to expand its internet presence.

Rosenblatt negotiated the sale of Intermix and MySpace for US$580 million to Rupert Murdoch's News Corp. on July 20, 2005, and served as a consultant to Fox for six months before co-founding Demand Media with Shawn Colo in May 2006.
