= Mewe (social media) =

Social network focused on privacy

mewe
- Company type: Private
- Available in: Multilingual
- Founded: May 16, 2012 (as Sgrouples)
- Headquarters: Lakewood Ranch, Florida, U.S.
- Area served: Worldwide
- Founders: Mark Weinstein, Jonathan Wolfe
- CEO: Carlos Betancourt
- Industry: Internet
- Products: mewe; MeWePro
- Website: mewe.com

mewe is a data-privacy-focused social media app. As a company based in Lakewood Ranch, Florida, it is also known as Sgrouples, Inc., doing business as mewe. Founded in 2012, the app has been described as a Facebook alternative due to its focus on data privacy. In 2022, mewe announced it will migrate its platform over time to a blockchain-based system. The application has over 21 million users globally, with over 700,000 interest-based groups within the app. As of 2026, mewe has officially launched its Digital Wallet and Tipping mechanism.

== Platform ==
=== Features ===
In March 2020, mewe launched dual-camera videos, which allow for both inward ("selfie") and outward-facing camera views. mewe also touts its "Privacy Bill of Rights" as the primary differentiator between it and Facebook.

As mewe neared the end of its beta testing cycle, the press called mewe's software "not dissimilar to Facebook". In 2020, Mashable described mewe as replicating Facebook's features.

The mewe site and application has features common to most social media and social networking sites: users can post text and images to a feed, react to others' posts using emoji, post animated GIFs, create specialized groups, post disappearing content, chat., and as of 2026 users can now also Tip on profiles and posts.

Online chat may occur between two or more people or among members of a group. Person-to-person online chat is similar to that in most other social media and social networking sites, and supports text, video calling, and voice calling. No longer a product offering, "Secret Chat" is limited to the paid subscription tier of mewe, and uses double ratchet encryption to ensure that chats are private and not visible even to mewe employees.

mewe reported in June 2018 that the site had 90,000 active groups, 60,000 of which were "public" and open to all users. Following the influx of Hong Kong users in 2020, mewe former CEO, Mark Weinstein, announced that the website would provide a Traditional Chinese language version by the end of the year.

=== User base and content ===
==== United States ====
Although mewe has not intentionally positioned itself as a social network for conservatives, Mashable noted in November 2020 that its active userbase trends conservative. The platform's choice not to moderate misinformation on the platform has attracted conservatives who felt mainstream social networks were censoring their posts, and those who have been banned from those platforms. mewe is considered an alt-tech platform.

mewe's loose moderation has made it popular among conspiracy theorists, including proponents of the far-right QAnon conspiracy theory, which was banned from Facebook in 2020, and the "Stop the Steal" conspiracy theory relating to the 2020 United States presidential election. According to Rolling Stone, mewe has "played host to general interest communities related to music and travel, but it has also come to be a haven for anti-vaxxers, QAnon conspiracy theorists, and, as reported by OneZero, far-right militia groups." Vice has described mewe as a "major anti-vaxx forum". BBC News has described some of the content on mewe as "extreme" and compared it to that of Gab. Business Insider has reported that some of the most popular groups on mewe focus on "extreme views, like anti-vaccine rhetoric, white supremacy, and conspiracy theories" and that in 2020 the platform was used to organize anti-lockdown protests. According to Megan Squire, groups belonging to the Boogaloo movement began using the platform after their removal from Facebook.

Shortly after the 2020 United States presidential election, mewe and other alt-tech platforms experienced a wave of signups from Trump supporters, following crackdowns on election-related misinformation and promotion of violence on mainstream social networks. On November 11, mewe was the second-most downloaded free app on the Apple App Store, behind its fellow alt-tech social network Parler. However, Mashable noted mewe's practice of creating accounts on behalf of users and businesses who were not users of the site may have served to inflate the amount of activity on the platform. mewe and other alt-tech networks again spiked in popularity shortly after the January 6, 2021 storming of the United States Capitol, though this subsided shortly after, with downloads falling more than 80% from January to February 2021.

On January 22, 2021, mewe's CEO said in an interview with NPR that "mewe is serious about putting limits on what people can say" and that he does not like sites where "anything goes", describing such sites as "disgusting". He also said that mewe would be hiring more moderation staff. In the coverage, NPR noted that mewe's stated rules are still "more lax than Facebook and Twitter," and that mewe had not yet banned groups dedicated to QAnon.

==== Hong Kong ====
Due to concerns surrounding possible pro-China censorship of Facebook, the site also gained popularity in Hong Kong in November 2020.

mewe gained popularity in Hong Kong in November 2020, with users migrating from Facebook due to concerns with possible pro-China censorship and moderation. The popularity of mewe in Hong Kong has been attributed to the city's suspicion of any restraint on free speech, after the Chinese government imposed significant restrictions on the expression of dissent following the 2019–20 protests, including the Hong Kong national security law. mewe communities in Hong Kong generally reflect everyday-life interests, with social media consultants in Hong Kong reporting that they have not seen extremist content in the communities they manage.

== Reception ==
In a 2015 review of the beta mewe service, British writer John Leonard called mewe "well-designed and pretty intuitive", but questioned whether the company's business model was a viable one. Andrew Orr, reviewing the site in April 2018, felt that service was a good one but that it did not have any advantages over existing social media sites. That, he felt, would make it difficult for mewe to attract users. In late 2020, the site also gained popularity in Hong Kong due to concerns surrounding possible pro-China censorship of Facebook. mewe takes a relatively light approach to content moderation according to some sources.

In 2022, mewe announced it will migrate its platform over time to a Web3, blockchain-based web infrastructure using Project Liberty's DSNP and Frequency protocol, which will run on the Polkadot Blockchain Network, and make mewe the largest decentralized social media platform.

== Business ==
The mewe business model does not rely on advertising revenue; rather, mewe generates revenue from mewe Premium subscriptions and from users purchasing premium enhancements a-la-carte such as a live voice / live video calling, extra storage, custom emojis, and custom themes.

mewe emphasizes its commitment to privacy and remaining ad-free. mewe has said they will never use cookies or spyware to generate content about users, and that it will not track user activity in any way or sell user data to a third party. mewe has described itself as the "anti-Facebook" due to its focus on data privacy, lack of moderation, and simple newsfeed algorithm. mewe had 20 million registered users.

Advisors to mewe include computer scientist Tim Berners-Lee, Apple co-founder Steve Wozniak, SumZero CEO and co-founder of HarvardConnection Divya Narendra, and filmmaker Cullen Hoback.

In 1998, entrepreneur Mark Weinstein and Jonathan Wolfe established SuperGroups.com, a social media website. The site was closed by its largest investor in 2001. Gathering largely the same leadership team, Weinstein incorporated Sgrouples Inc. in 2011. mewe was incorporated as a subsidiary of Sgrouples, and based in Culver City, California. Over the next six years, Sgrouples raised about $10 million from investors including lynda.com founder Lynda Weinman, fashion designer Rachel Roy, and authors Jack Canfield and Marci Shimoff.

mewe finished its initial financing round in July 2018 by raising $5.2 million in new funds. The company began work on upgrading mewe and initiating work on an enterprise version called MeWePRO.

In December 2019, mewe launched "mewe Premium", an optional $4.99 per month subscription that gives users a bundle of enhancements including: live voice / live video calling; unlimited custom themes; unlimited custom emojis and stickers; video journals for stories; 100GB of MeWe Cloud Storage; and more.

In September 2022, CEO Jeffrey Scott Edell of mewe announced that it had raised $27 million in a Series A round led by private company McCourt Global, which contributed $15 million. Existing investors contributed another $12 million—this round values mewe at approximately $200 million. Mark Weinstein was a founder of mewe and its CEO until April 2021. Jeffrey Scott Edell replaced him as CEO in 2021. Carlos Betancourt became CEO in 2025.
