= Uken Games =

Canadian video game developer

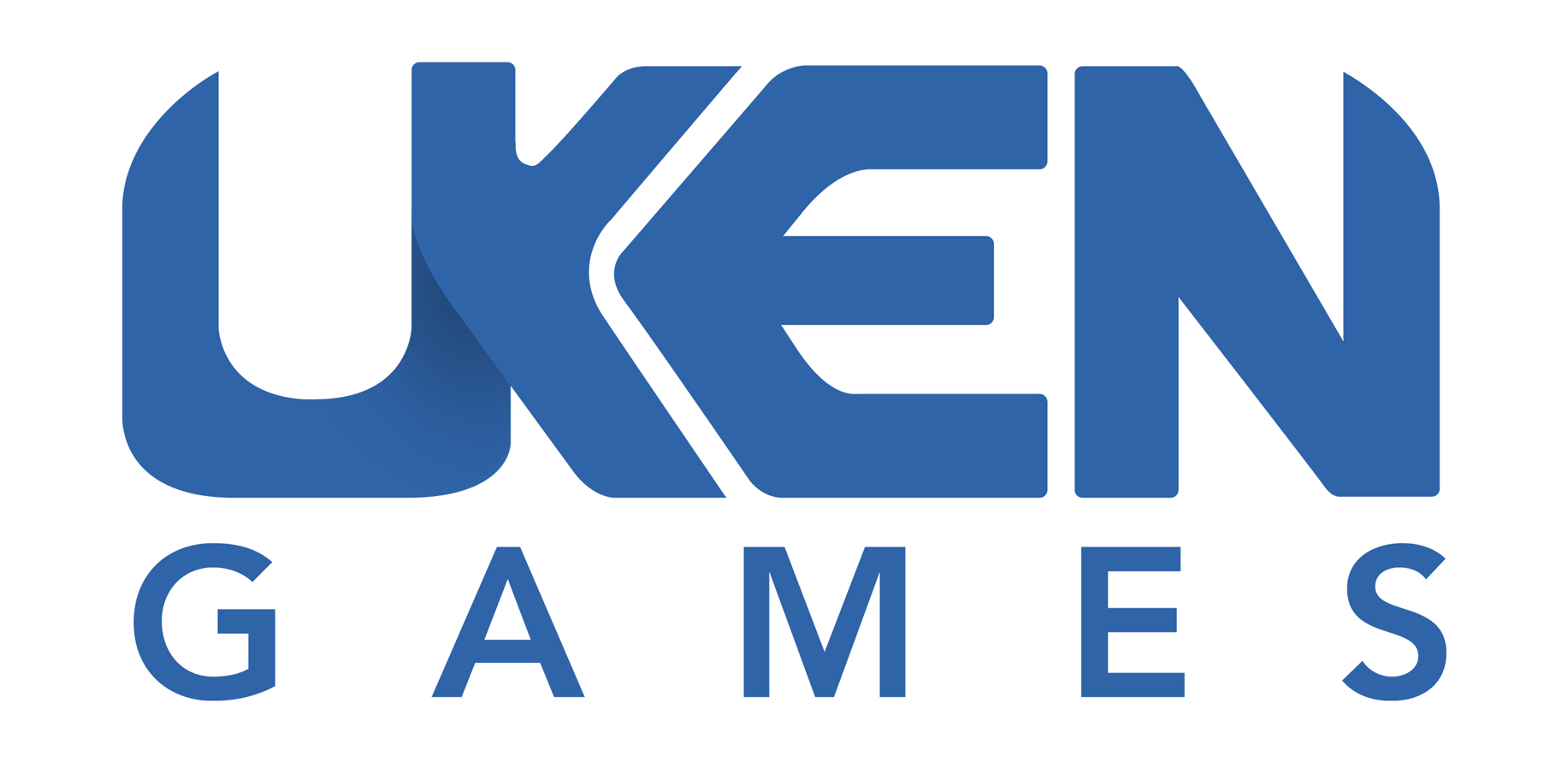
- Type: Private
- Industry: Video games
- Founded: 2009
- Founders: Chris Ye & Mark Lampert
- Headquarters: Canada
- Number of employees: 90+ (2019)
- Website: wwww.uken.com

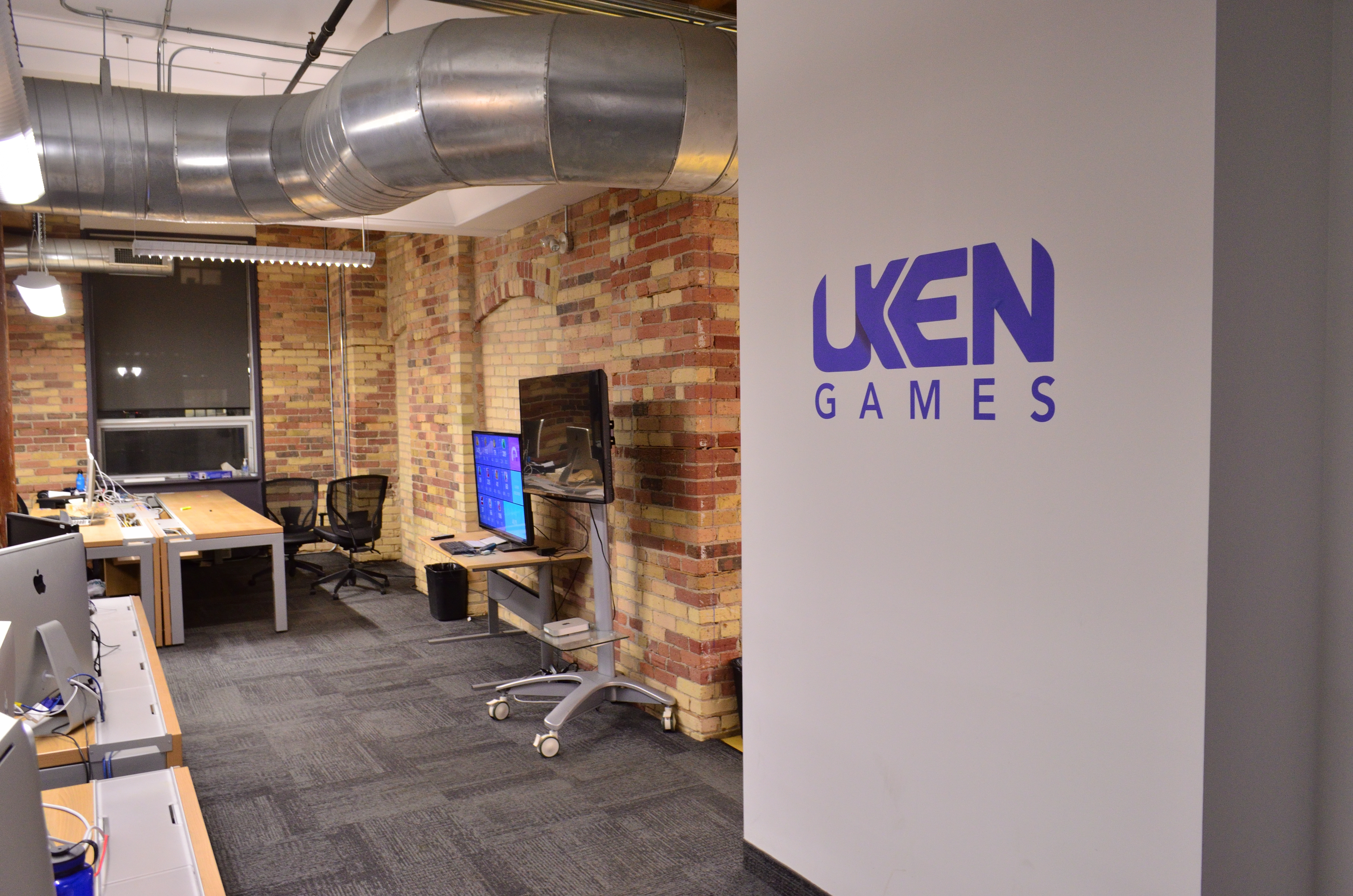
Uken Games office in Toronto

Uken Games is an independent game studio based in Toronto, Ontario, Canada. The company was founded in 2009 by Chris Ye and Mark Lampert to build cross platform social and mobile games for iOS and Android. In 2011, the company was the recipient of the Digi Award for Canada’s Most Promising New Digital Company. Uken was in the top 10 of Deloitte's Fast 50 and #13 in their Fast 500 for 2014, after being one of Deloitte's "Companies-to-Watch" in 2013. Uken was certified as a Great Place to Work and was recognized as one of Canada's Top Small & Medium Employers in 2017. Uken partnered with Sony to develop Jeopardy! World Tour which was released in May 2017. Subsequently in March 2018, Uken also developed and released a second trivia title Who Wants To Be A Millionaire? which became the top trivia game on mobile. In 2020, Uken released Ava’s Manor, a solitaire game where users renovate and decorate the manor while discovering mysterious clues and dabbling in a romantic love story.

The studio also hosts numerous developer events including meetups for the Toronto Unity Developers, ReactJS, PhoneGap Toronto, DevOps Toronto, AngularJS Toronto and Go TO. Uken regularly sponsors TOJam (Toronto Game Jam) and Level Up Showcase. They hosted MolyJam’s Toronto chapter in 2012 and 2013, and were a sponsor of Gamercamp 2013 and the UTGDDC Game Jam.

Uken participates in various fundraising efforts for organizations such as the Movember Foundation, Canadian Breast Cancer Foundation, Canadian Red Cross disaster relief, American Red Cross disaster relief, Free the Children, Sunnybrook Cancer Research, Extra Life Marathon for Sick Kids, Camp Oochigeas (Sporting Life 10K) and Daily Bread Food Bank. Since the beginning of 2011, Uken’s charitable contributions total over $215,000

== Current Titles ==
Year	Game	Platforms		
Year	Game	iOS	Android	Facebook
2020	Ava's Manor	Yes	Yes	
2018	Who Wants To Be A Millionaire?	Yes	Yes	
2017	Jeopardy! World Tour	Yes	Yes	

== Past Titles ==
Year	Game	Platforms				
Year	Game	iOS	Android	Facebook	BlackBerry	WP8
2014	Titans	Yes	Yes	Yes		
2012	Bingo Pop	Yes	Yes	Yes		
2011	Mighty Monsters	Yes	Yes			
2011	Crime Inc	Yes	Yes	Yes	Yes	Yes
2011	The Streetz	Yes	Yes	Yes	Yes	Yes
2010	Forces of War	Yes	Yes	Yes	Yes	Yes
2010	Age of Legends	Yes	Yes	Yes	Yes	Yes
2010	Dark Galaxy	Yes	Yes	Yes	Yes	Yes
2010	Villains	Yes	Yes	Yes	Yes	Yes
2009	Superheroes Alliance	Yes	Yes	Yes	Yes	Yes
