= Harry Potter: Hogwarts Mystery =

2018 role-playing video game

- Display art for Hogwarts Mystery
- Developer: Jam City
- Publisher: Jam City
- Composer: Alexandre Cote
- Series: Wizarding World
- Platforms: Android iOS iPadOS
- Release: 25 April 2018
- Genre: Role-playing
- Mode: Single-player

Harry Potter: Hogwarts Mystery is a 2018 role-playing video game developed and published by Jam City. The game is set in the Wizarding World and based on the Harry Potter novels written by J.K. Rowling. Hogwarts Mystery follows a player character entering the fictional school of Hogwarts and is set before the events of the novels. The game released on 25 April 2018 for Android and iOS devices. Many of the actors from the Harry Potter film series provided their voices for the game.

The game received generally negative reviews from critics. Reviewers noted the game's use of the Wizarding World to be a positive, but many were highly critical of the microtransactions present. These transactions, especially those used to regain the in-game energy system, were near-universally panned for how they would constantly break the game's pacing. The game has grossed an estimated $400 million as of June 2022.

== Gameplay and premise ==
Outside of the Great Hall, quest markers on the left hand side, with energy and other consumables on the right.

Harry Potter: Hogwarts Mystery is a role-playing video game set in the Harry Potter universe established by J. K. Rowling's series of novels. The game is set between Harry Potter's birth and his enrollment at Hogwarts. The game revolves around the player character's journey through life at the school. They can attend magic classes, learn spells, battle rivals, date characters, play quidditch and embark on quests. Through the game's encounter system, players make choices that affect the game's narrative, though sometimes these choices are locked if the player's statistics are not high enough. Players can interact with characters from the series, such as Albus Dumbledore, Rubeus Hagrid and Severus Snape. After graduating Hogwarts, the game follows the player character in their career with the secret ROCC (Rare, Obscure, and Confounding Case Division) in the Ministry of Magic. Beyond Hogwarts consists of volumes, each coinciding with a year of Harry Potter's Hogwarts school career.

"Energy" is used to perform tasks throughout the game, which regenerate over time. Players tap on the screen to move the character between places. The player also gains different levels of courage, empathy, and knowledge by making choices in game, with higher levels of a particular attribute allowing the player to choose some different dialogue options in game and change interactions with other students and staff.

== Development and release ==
Harry Potter: Hogwarts Mystery was developed and published by Los Angeles-based mobile video game company Jam City. The game was licensed to Portkey Games, a publishing label established by Warner Bros. Interactive Entertainment to create games based on Harry Potter, with Hogwarts Mystery being the label's debut game. Actors from the Harry Potter film series such as Michael Gambon, Maggie Smith, Gemma Jones, Sally Mortemore, Warwick Davis, and Zoë Wanamaker voice their respective characters from the films.

The game was first announced on 18 January 2018 with a scheduled release on Android and iOS mobile devices on 25 April 2018. The game's release featured many components found in freemium games, such as microtransactions. Following backlash from fans, many of these microtransactions were reduced in price.

== Reception ==
Reception

Aggregate score
Aggregator	Score
Metacritic	43/100

Review scores
Publication	Score
Gamezebo	4/5
IGN	US: 3.5/10; ES: 4/10
Pocket Gamer	2.5/5
The Guardian	2/5
App Advice	7.9/10
Metro	4/10
Multiplayer.it	5.8/10
Game Rant	1.5/5
Vandal	5.5/10

According to review aggregator website Metacritic Harry Potter: Hogwarts Mystery was reviewed "generally unfavourable", receiving an average score of 43 out of 100 based on reviews of 14 critics. Marc Hewitt from GameZebo praised the concept of a Harry Potter mobile game and stated that Hogwarts Mystery "largely lives up to the hype". Christine Chan from App Advice commented that Hogwarts Mystery is a "nice representation" of the world set out in Harry Potter and commended the game for letting her "live out [her] Hogwarts dreams".

However, the frequent enticements to pay real-world money for microtransactions in the game was widely criticised. One notable example highlighted by critics was an early scene in which the player is subject to being strangled by a Devil's Snare, during which their energy is immediately depleted; the player must then either wait around half an hour for energy to replenish or spend real-world money to receive immediate energy instead. The developers later defended the scene in an interview and disregarded suggestions of its controversial nature. GameZebo commented that the "[r]estrictive energy system rears its head early" and commented that game needed greater pacing. Chan from App Advice said the timers and energy system "left a sour taste in [her] mouth." Emily Sowden from Pocket Gamer called the use of free-to-play mechanics "maddening" and described the experience as being "behind a paywall".

Kotaku's Gita Jackson also commented on the game's use of these mechanics, saying, "where the game falters, is how it implements its free-to-play elements". Jackson interviewed one user that even took up writing Harry Potter fanfiction because they were unable to play the game as often as they wanted. David Jagnaeux from IGN called it "awful," describing the microtransactions as "gratuitous" and stating that they "actively prevented" him from enjoying the game. Keza MacDonald of The Guardian called Hogwarts Mystery "a dull game with a great concept, made unplayable by its hyper-aggressive monetisation."

The game was awarded Best Science Fiction or Fantasy Mobile Game during the 2018 Dragon Awards. The game was nominated for Best Breakthrough Game during the 2019 Google Play Awards but lost to Marvel Strike Force. By August 2018, the game had grossed $55 million. It has grossed an estimated US$110 million as of March 2019.
