= Owen Van Natta =

American businessman (1969–2026)

- Born: November 12, 1969
- Died: August 11, 2026 (aged 56)
- Education: University of California, Santa Cruz
- Occupations: Founder, OVN Capital
- Known for: Former COO at Facebook former CEO at MySpace former executive vice president of Business at Zynga
- Website: http://www.ovncap.com

Owen Thomas Van Natta (November 12, 1969 – August 11, 2026) was an American businessman who found success in a variety of tech spaces, including e-tail, social networking, music streaming, gaming, finance and investment. He served as founder of OVN Capital and held notable positions in various tech companies, including Amazon.com, Facebook, Myspace, BOKU Mobile Payments, and Zynga. Van Natta held a bachelor's degree in English and American literature from the University of California, Santa Cruz.

Van Natta was also a founder and managing director of Prefix Capital, as well as a founder of 415, LLC.

Van Natta married Jennifer Van Natta in 1998 and had two children together. The couple divorced in August 2019.

== Career ==
From June 1998 to August 2005, Van Natta was vice president of Worldwide Business and Corporate Development at Amazon.com, where he managed global marketing programs and strategic partnerships during the period where Amazon was laying the groundwork for the company's historic growth in market capitalization. He was part of the founding team of A9.com, the Amazon.com search engine optimization company, and was responsible for site operations and sponsored-link advertising.

Van Natta became the chief operating officer at Facebook, where he focused on revenue operations, business development, and strategic partnerships from September 2005 to February 2008. At the time of his departure, his title was chief revenue officer. He went on to work as the chief executive officer of Project Playlist in 2008, a music sharing website allowing users to search for music, create custom playlists, and share the content with friends.

In April 2009, Van Natta became chief executive officer of MySpace, where he was responsible for all aspects of the company's strategic vision and the execution of its global business initiatives. Van Natta created new features as a part of his refocusing of strategy, and tried to move MySpace from a social networking platform to an entertainment content distribution platform. By the end of 2009, NewsCorp's Fox Interactive Media business posted revenue of $226 million and profits of $7 million, the vast majority of it from MySpace. After spending ten months in his position, he stepped down and joined Zynga in February 2010. Van Natta joined Zynga, a tech company that makes online social games, as executive vice president of business. As a member of the Board of Directors in August 2010, he was responsible for the company's revenue strategy, corporate development, international expansion, and brand. He resigned from Zynga on November 17, 2011.

He later was employed as a founder and managing director of Prefix Capital.
