= Brad Greenspan =

American businessman

- Education: UCLA
- Occupation: Internet entrepreneur
- Known for: Founding LivePlace.com, Myspace.com and eUniverse Inc

Brad Greenspan is an internet entrepreneur best known for overseeing eUniverse’s launch of Myspace.com in August 2003.

Greenspan founded eUniverse, Inc. an internet company which in 1999 acquired CDUniverse.com with approximately 300,000 monthly users. It survived the 2001 .com-bust, diversified, listed to Nasdaq, and grew to over 49 million monthly unique visitors by the end of 2001 while becoming cash flow positive.

== Education and career ==
Brad Greenspan after five years of college earned a University of California Los Angeles Political Science undergraduate degree. During his junior year he earned a finders fee for matching electric automobile battery company Electrosource, Inc. with Liviakis Financial an investor relations firm helping the tiny publicly traded Austin, Texas based startup raise needed additional financing. Started investment bank Palisades Capital in 1995 headquartered in his room inside the Sigma Nu fraternity on the corner of Strathmore and Gayley Ave. in Westwood, California. By the end of 1998, Palisades Capital had helped five public companies raise over $60,000,000 in financing specializing in Reg-D financing for publicly traded technology companies including $45,000,000 for Hayes Modems’s merger with Access Beyond.

After Greenspan started California incorporated Entertainment Universe, Inc. in 1998, Palisades Capital recruited New York investment bank Gerard Klauer to co-syndicate $7 million dollar private placement facilitating its reverse merger, name change to eUniverse, Inc., and allowing it to be traded on the OTC bulletin board stock ticker EUNI, growing to one of the largest online entertainment networks by 2001, and launching 100% owned Myspace.com in 2003.

=== Products ===
The first new eUniverse product released under Greenspan’s leadership was LivePlace. Launched during the fall Internet World 1999, Computer Technology Review described it as a “self contained java applet” platform where “users make their online selves known to others online” using “chat in new ways to build communities on the fly”, and “collaborative browsing”. Greenspan described it as “technology that turns a website into a public place”. eUniverse in its 2000 10K described “Community Building Technology” “LivePlace community-building Software”.

=== The eUniverse Network ===
Prior to the launch of Myspace, Greenspan beginning as executive chairman before adding the CEO title in June 2000, grew eUniverse into one of the largest entertainment networks on the internet. MediaPost’s Everybody Loves eUniverse article described the company as offering its visitors an escape from the grind of their daily routines with entertainment offerings ranging from games and funny greetings to jokes, newsletters, and short animation.

According to Nielsen-Netrating, the eUniverse Network was the sixth-largest internet property for the week ending October 28, 2001, surpassing Google.

Greenspan is the only U.S. CEO to have created three separate #1 websites ranked by U.S. monthly unique audience: Nielsen Netratings ranked Flowgo.com the #1 entertainment website in 2001 with MediaPost noting its “astounding 300% growth in traffic during the past year”, Skilljam.com the #1 play for cash skilled gaming website in September 2003, and Myspace.com which became the #1 Social Network in February 2004.

Flowgo.com launched in late 2000 offered new daily flash cartoons, funpages, and greeting card, becoming the #1 entertainment website on the internet in June 2001 with 12,980,000 unique monthly visitors according to Nielsen NetRatings.

Other notable eUniverse websites included leading game website Madblast.com launched in 2001, dating service CupidJunction.com launched in 2001, and flash entertainment website Justsaywow.com launched in 2000 which boasted a daily email newsletter with over 50 million subscribers.

== Strategic Microsoft Gaming Partnership ==
Greenspan led efforts to capture strategic partnerships for Skilljam.com a skilled online gaming property launched by eUniverse in 2002. In March 2003, Skilljam announced it had struck an exclusive multi-year partnership to run skilled pay-per-play gaming for Microsoft's MSN property. Forbes described the partnership in a March 18, 2003 article titled “Win Bill Gates’ Money”.

Greenspan resigned from eUniverse in late October 2003 as CEO and as a Director in December 2003, stating that he felt that other "directors have breached their fiduciary duties to the Company and its stockholders." The company was sold to News Corp in 2005 for $12.00 per share in cash, which Greenspan, the largest non-insider stockholder opposed. In September 2005 Greenspan formed FreeMySpace LLC for the purpose of giving shareholders the “opportunity to participate in the exciting future of MySpace.com as a free and independently thriving business”.

On September 23, 2005, an investor group led by Greenspan, FreeMySpace LLC urged shareholders to vote against News Corp's offer which “significantly undervalued” MySpace which had the “potential to achieve values in the coming years approaching that of other publicly traded online companies such as Google, Yahoo, and eBay." FreeMySpace made a counteroffer allowing each shareholder to sell up to 50% of their shares at $13.50 a “significant premium to the proposed News Corp offer” continue to own shares in MySpace's publicly traded parent company which would be “transformed to focus exclusively on MySpace, divest non-MySpace assets to generate resources necessary for growth and development and be renamed and trade as MySpace.

MySpace’s publicly traded parent company rejected FreeMySpace LLC’s offer calling it “speculative” before completing the transaction with News Corp in early October 2005.

== LiveUniverse ==
In 2006, Greenspan launched Los Angeles based LiveUniverse, Inc., a network of entertainment websites, out of business. LiveVideo, Inc. and its livevideo.com (now defunct) social network launched in 2008 were one of the first live-streaming platforms. In September 2021, Greenspan's LiveVideo.com Inc. was successful in UDRP arbitration Livevideo.com Inc. v. Patrick Ty / EE88 which ordered the LiveVideo.com domain transferred back to LiveVideo.com Inc. a company where Greenspan serves as president.

== Asia and Online Gaming Projects ==
In 2009, Greenspan was awarded an incubator fund by the Singapore Government's National Research Foundation (NRF) and agreed to live in Singapore while investing in Singapore digital media startups. Greenspan's BroadwebAsia partnered with Major League Baseball Advanced Media (MLBAM) in 2008 to launch MLB.com's first Chinese website MLB.cn.

== Artificial Intelligence ==
Greenspan's predictions about AI have gained recognition, bolstering his reputation as a futurist. In early 2023, he made what may be considered the most accurate prediction: a world where specialized AI-bots would serve families and customers for extended periods of time. This caught the attention of Fox Business, who featured him in a report on Artificial Intelligence. The report, titled "ChatGPT, AI platforms excite but also concern experts", also highlighted Brad's insights and worries about the potential hazards of depending too heavily on AI. He warned that an SAI-BOT could be vulnerable to malware or manipulation, using its built-up trust over years of service as a trojan horse to exploit the very family it was meant to assist.

Brad is the President of LiveVideo.AI Corp a Delaware incorporated technology company founded in 2023.

== MySpace ==
The MySpace service was founded in August 2003 as a new initiative and 100% owned division of publicly traded internet company eUniverse, which later in mid-2004 changed its name to Intermix. eUniverse created and marketed the Myspace website, providing the division with a complete infrastructure of finance, human resources, technical expertise, bandwidth, and server capacity right out of the gate so the MySpace team wasn't distracted with typical start-up issues. The project was overseen by Brad Greenspan, eUniverse's Founder, chairman, CEO, with Chris DeWolfe, MySpace's former CEO, Josh Berman, Tom Anderson, MySpace's former president, and a team of programmers and resources provided by eUniverse.

== Brad Greenspan & The MySpace Report ==
In October 2006, Brad Greenspan launched a website, called freemyspace.com, and published reports that called for the Securities and Exchange Commission, the United States Department of Justice, and the U.S. Senate Committee on Finance to investigate News Corp's acquisition of MySpace as "one of the largest merger and acquisition scandals in U.S. history." The report's main allegation is that News Corp. should have valued MySpace at US$20 billion rather than US$327 million, and had, in effect, defrauded Intermix shareholders through an unfair deal process. The report received a mixed response from financial commentators in the press. A lawsuit led by Greenspan challenging the acquisition was dismissed by a judge.

Greenspan's claims were validated when in June 2010 Judge George H. King ruled in favor of shareholders in a summary judgment decision. According to Gretchen Morgenson of The New York Times, "Viewed as a whole, Judge King wrote, the evidence indicates that “there are at least triable issues of fact” about whether Mr. Rosenblatt acted in good faith or tilted the auction in favor of the News Corporation “for a purpose other than maximizing shareholder value.”

A trial might also determine if the rest of the Intermix board improperly put Mr. Rosenblatt in charge of the auction process and then turned a blind eye to his actions, the judge concluded." Further, the Judge refused to dismiss the damage report finding "shareholders suffered economic damages in the News Corporation bid of $506 million to $667 million".
