= Aber Whitcomb =

Founder of Myspace (born 1977)

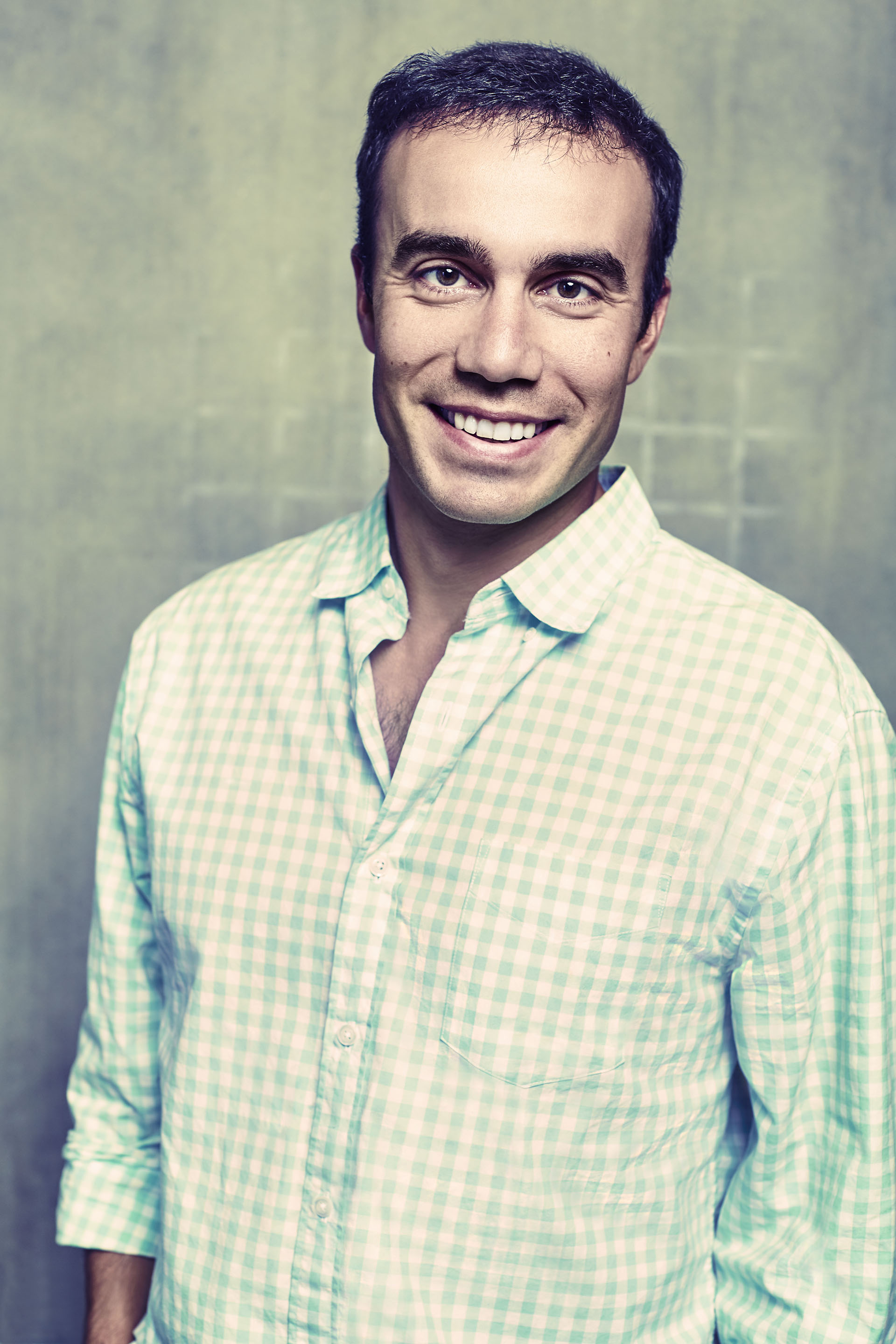
- Education: University of Washington
- Occupations: CTO and Co-Founder of Jam City, Inc

Aber Whitcomb (born 1977) is the founder and CEO of Salt AI. He was the CTO and Co-Founder of Jam City, Inc (formerly SGN Games). As CTO of Jam City Inc, a multi-platform game developer and distributor, Aber Whitcomb oversaw the cross-platform technology strategy and played a key role in developing and operating Jam City titles on a global scale. Whitcomb is a recognized expert in large scale computing, networking and storage and frequently speaks on these topics at industry events. He has been profiled in publications such as VentureBeat, The New York Times, and SoCalTech.

Prior to Jam City, Whitcomb's most recent role was CTO and co-founder of MySpace where he was responsible for the engineering and technical operations groups. InfoWorld named Whitcomb as one of the "Top 25 CTOs of 2009."

Whitcomb is a co-founder of Core Scientific, a blockchain and artificial intelligence hosting, transaction processing and application development company that has raised $100 million in funding. Whitcomb is also a co-founder of i/o Ventures, an early stage startup program that focuses heavily on mentorship. He graduated from the University of Washington and was born and raised in Bellingham, WA.

Whitcomb owns Victoria (dinosaur) a specimen of the species Tyrannosaurus rex.
