= Myspace =

American social networking service

Myspace LLC
- Company type: Subsidiary
- Website type: Social networking service
- Available in: 14 languages
- Founded: August 1, 2003; 23 years ago
- Headquarters: United States
- Area served: Worldwide
- Owner: Viant Technology LLC
- Founders: Chris DeWolfe; Tom Anderson; Jon Hart
- Key people: Tim Vanderhook (CEO); Chris Vanderhook (COO)
- Employees: 150 (2018)
- Website: myspace.com
- Registration: Required
- Launched: August 1, 2003; 23 years ago
- Current status: Active

Myspace (formerly stylized as MySpace, currently myspace; and sometimes my␣, with an elongated open box symbol) is an American social networking service. Launched on August 1, 2003, it was the first social network to reach a global audience and had a significant influence on technology, pop culture and music. It also played a critical role in the early growth of companies like YouTube and created a developer platform that launched companies such as Zynga and RockYou among others, to success. From 2005 to 2009, Myspace was the largest social networking site in the world.

In July 2005, Myspace was acquired by News Corporation for $580 million; in June 2006, it surpassed Yahoo Mail and Google Search to become the most visited website in the United States. During the 2008 fiscal year, it generated $800 million in revenue. At its peak in April 2008, Myspace had 115 million monthly visitors; by that time, the recently emergent Facebook had about the same number of visitors, but somewhat more global users than MySpace. In May 2009, Facebook surpassed Myspace in its number of unique U.S. visitors. Since then, the number of Myspace users has declined steadily despite several redesigns. As of 2019, Myspace had seven million monthly visitors.

In June 2009, Myspace employed approximately 1,600 people. In June 2011, Specific Media Group and Justin Timberlake jointly purchased the company for approximately $35 million. On February 11, 2016, it was announced that Myspace and its parent company had been purchased by Time Inc. for $87 million. On January 31, 2018, Time Inc. was in turn purchased by Meredith Corporation, and the next year, on November 4, 2019, Meredith spun off Myspace and its original holding company (Viant Technology Holding Inc.) and sold it to Viant Technology LLC.

== History ==
=== 2003–2005: Beginnings and rise ===
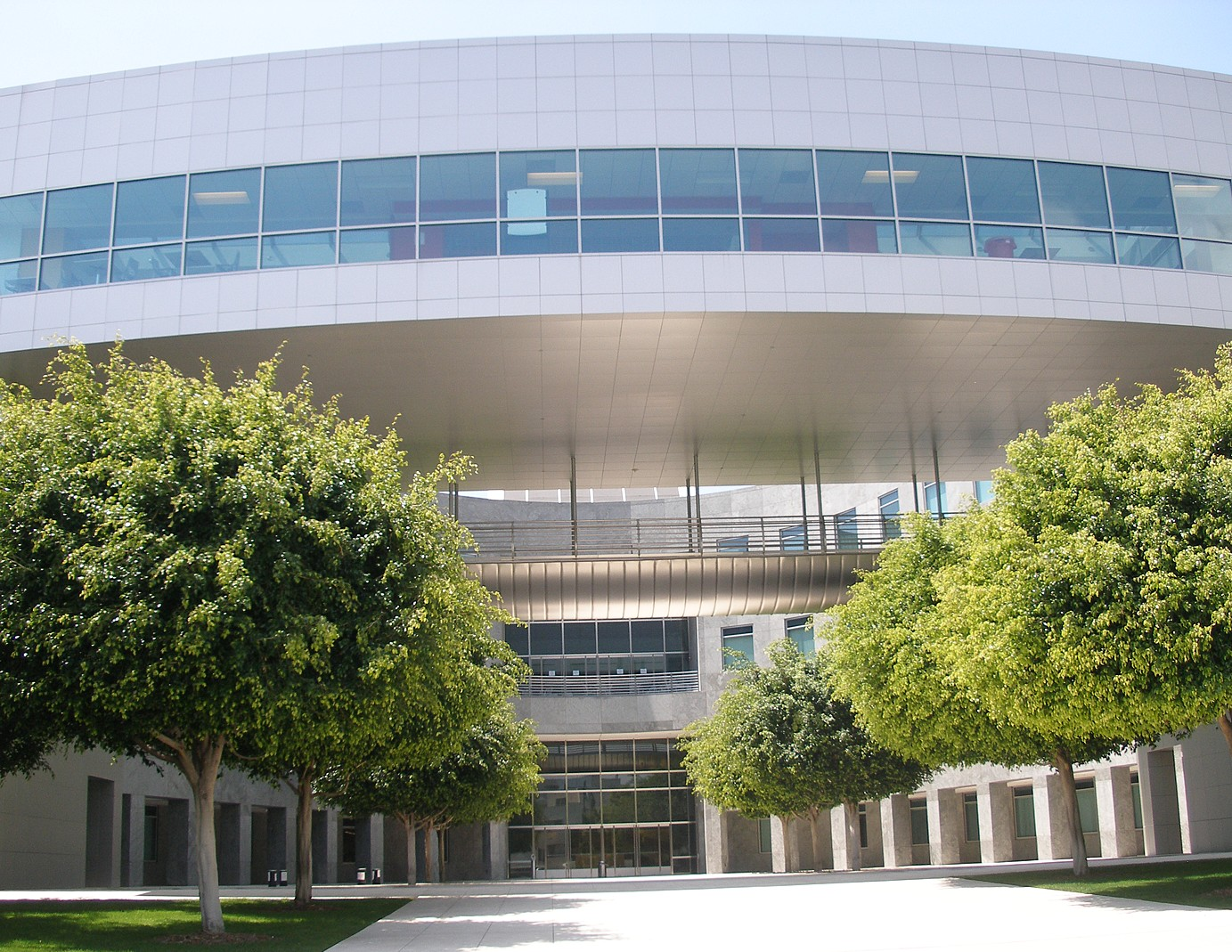
Fox Interactive Media's former headquarters in Beverly Hills, California, before 2016, where Myspace was also housed (now home to Fandango)

In August 2003, several eUniverse employees with Friendster accounts saw potential in its social networking features. The group decided to mimic the more popular features of the website. Within 10 days, the first version of MySpace was ready for launch, implemented using ColdFusion. A complete infrastructure of finance, human resources, technical expertise, bandwidth, and server capacity was available for the site. The project was overseen by Brad Greenspan (eUniverse's founder, chairman and CEO), who managed Chris DeWolfe (MySpace's starting CEO), Josh Berman, Tom Anderson (MySpace's starting president), and a team of programmers and resources provided by eUniverse. It was during this early period in June 2003, just prior to the birth of MySpace, that Jeffrey Edell was brought on as chairman of parent company Intermix Media.

The first MySpace users were eUniverse employees. The company held contests to see who could sign up the most users. eUniverse used its 20 million users and e-mail subscribers to breathe life into MySpace and move it to the head of the pack of social networking websites. A key architect was tech expert Toan Nguyen, who helped stabilize the platform when Greenspan asked him to join the team. Co-founder and CTO Aber Whitcomb played an integral role in software architecture, utilizing the then-superior development speed of ColdFusion over other dynamic database driven server-side languages of the time. Despite having over ten times the number of developers, Friendster, which was developed in JavaServer Pages (jsp), could not keep up with the speed of development of MySpace and cfm. For example, users could customize the background, look and feel of pages on MySpace.

MySpace originally gained users because of how easy it made communication with other users. Before MySpace debuted, many people communicated online through instant messaging or IM. However, MySpace got so popular that people started to use MySpace to message people even more than IM. This was especially true in bigger cities that had more people compared to suburbs that still used IM more.

MySpace logo used from June 2004 to October 2010

The MySpace.com domain was originally owned by YourZ.com, Inc., intended until 2002 for use as an online data storage and sharing site. By late 2003, it was transitioned from a file storage service to a social networking site. A friend who also worked in the data storage business reminded DeWolfe that he had earlier bought the MySpace.com domain. DeWolfe suggested they charge a fee for the basic MySpace service. However, Greenspan nixed the idea, believing that keeping the site free was necessary to make it a successful community. MySpace quickly gained popularity among teenagers and young adults. In February 2005, DeWolfe held talks with Mark Zuckerberg over acquiring Facebook, but rejected Zuckerberg's offer to sell Facebook to him for $75 million. Some employees of MySpace, including DeWolfe and Berman, were able to purchase equity in the property before MySpace and its parent company eUniverse (now renamed Intermix Media) were bought.

=== 2005–2009: Purchase by News Corp. and peak years ===
In July 2005, in one of the company's first major Internet purchases, News Corporation purchased MySpace for US$580 million. At the time of the acquisition, the company was seeing 16 million monthly users and was growing exponentially. News Corporation had beat out Viacom by offering a higher price for the website, and the purchase was seen as a good investment at the time. Within a year, MySpace had tripled in value from its purchase price. News Corporation saw the purchase as a way to capitalize on Internet advertising and drive traffic to other News Corporation properties.

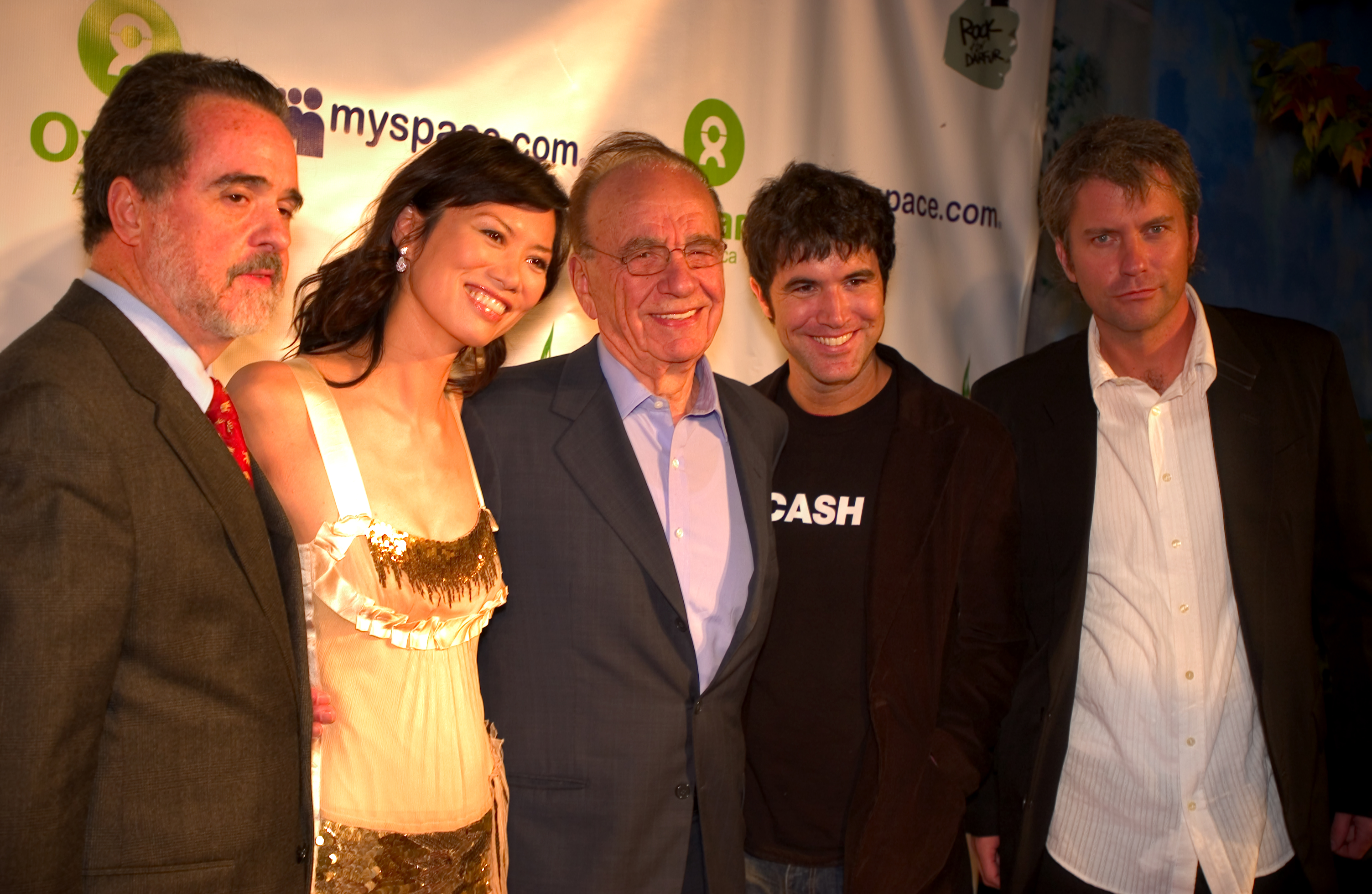
Oxfam America president Raymond C. Offenheiser, Wendi Deng and Rupert Murdoch with MySpace co-founders Anderson and DeWolfe at the 2006 Oxfam/MySpace Rock for Darfur event

After the acquisition, MySpace continued its exponential growth. In January 2006, the site was signing up 200,000 new users a day. A year later, it was registering 320,000 users a day, and had overtaken Yahoo! to become the most visited website in the United States. ComScore said that a key driver of the site's success in the US was high "engagement levels", with the average MySpace user viewing over 660 pages a month.

In January 2006, Fox announced plans to launch a UK version of MySpace. During 2006, MySpace launched localized versions in 11 countries across Europe, Asia and the Americas, including MySpace China with Solstice. At the time, Travis Katz, senior vice-president for international operations, reported that 30 million of the site's 90 million users were coming from outside of the United States.

The 100 millionth MySpace account was created on August 9, 2006, in the Netherlands. That same month, MySpace signed a landmark advertising deal with Google that guaranteed MySpace $900 million over three years, over 55% more than the price News Corporation had paid to acquire the business. In exchange, Google received exclusive rights to provide Web search results and sponsored links on MySpace. When the deal was signed, Google chairman Eric Schmidt said, "When we looked at what was growing on the Web, all our internal metrics pointed to [MySpace] [...] It's important to move Google to where users are, and that is where user-generated content is."

By October 2006, MySpace had grown from generating $1 million in revenue per month to $30 million per month, half of which came from the Google deal. The remaining 50% came from display advertising sold by MySpace's in-house sales team. In November 2006, Myspace announced a 50-50 joint venture with Softbank to launch the site in Japan.

In mid-2007, MySpace was the largest social-networking site in every European country where it had created a local presence. By July 2007, Nielsen//NetRatings reported the company's "active reach", or the percentage of the population that visited the site, was anywhere from 10 to 15 times higher in Spain, France and Germany than for runner-up Facebook; in the United Kingdom, MySpace led Facebook by two-to-one in terms of reach.

MySpace would even land deals with major corporations like Sony. In 2007 MySpace partnered with Sony BMG, a Sony record label, to put music directly on the MySpace platform. Sony became interested in MySpace as they had 110 million users and had a lot of musical artists make their start on the platform.

On November 1, 2007, MySpace and Bebo joined the Google-led OpenSocial alliance, which already included Friendster, Hi5, LinkedIn, Plaxo, Ning, and Six Apart. The alliance's goal was to promote a common set of standards for software developers to write programs for social networks. Google had been unsuccessful in building its own social networking site Orkut in the American market, and was using the alliance to present a counterweight to Facebook.

By late 2007 and into 2008, MySpace was considered the leading social networking site, and consistently beat out its main competitor Facebook in traffic. Initially, the emergence of Facebook did little to diminish MySpace's popularity; at the time, Facebook was targeted only at college students.

At its peak, when News Corporation attempted to merge it with Yahoo! in 2007, Myspace was valued at $12 billion and had more than 300 million registered users.

=== 2009–2016: Decline and sale by News Corporation ===
On April 19, 2008, Facebook overtook MySpace in Alexa rankings. In May 2009, Facebook surpassed MySpace in the number of unique U.S. visitors. From that point, Myspace saw a consistent loss of membership. There are several suggested explanations for its decline, including the fact that it stuck to a "portal strategy" of building an audience around entertainment and music, whereas Facebook and Twitter continually added new features to improve the social networking experience.

A former MySpace executive suggested that the $900 million three-year advertisement deal with Google, while being a short-term cash windfall, was a handicap in the long run, as it required MySpace to place even more ads on its already heavily advertised space, which made the site slow, more difficult to use and less flexible. MySpace could not experiment with its own site without forfeiting revenue, while Facebook was rolling out a new, clean site design. MySpace CEO Chris DeWolfe reported that he had to fight Fox Interactive Media's sales team, who monetized the site without regard to user experience. In 2012, Katz described how News Corporation had put significant pressure on MySpace to "focus on near-term monetization, as opposed to thinking about long-term product strategy," while Facebook focused on user engagement over revenue.

Danah Boyd, a senior researcher at Microsoft Research, noted of social networking websites that "companies might serially rise, fall, and disappear, as influential peers pull others in on the climb up—and signal to flee when it's time to get out." The volatility of social networks was exemplified in 2006, when Connecticut Attorney General Richard Blumenthal launched an investigation into children's exposure to pornography on MySpace. The resulting media frenzy and the site's lack of an effective spam filter gave the site a reputation as a "vortex of perversion". Around that time, specialized social media companies such as Twitter formed and began targeting users on MySpace, while Facebook rolled out communication tools that were seen as safe in comparison to MySpace. In addition, MySpace had particular problems with vandalism, phishing, malware, and spam, which it failed to curtail, making the site inhospitable.

These have been cited as factors why users, who as teenagers were MySpace's strongest audience in 2006 and 2007, had been migrating to Facebook, which started strongly with the 18-to-24 group (mostly college students) and has been much more successful than MySpace at attracting older users.

News Corporation chairman and CEO Rupert Murdoch was said to be frustrated that MySpace never met expectations as a distribution outlet for Fox studio content and missed the US$1 billion mark in total revenues. This resulted in DeWolfe and Anderson gradually losing their status within Murdoch's inner circle of executives, as well as DeWolfe's mentor Peter Chernin, president and COO of News Corporation, departing the company in June 2009. Former AOL executive Jonathan Miller, who joined News Corporation in charge of the digital media business, was in the job for three weeks when he shuffled MySpace's executive team in April 2009. MySpace president Tom Anderson stepped down while Chris DeWolfe was replaced as CEO by former Facebook COO Owen Van Natta. A meeting at News Corporation over the direction of MySpace in March 2009 was reportedly the catalyst for that management shakeup, with the Google search deal about to expire and the departure of key personnel (Myspace's COO, SVP of engineering, and SVP of strategy) to form a startup. Furthermore, the opening of extravagant new offices around the world was questioned, as Facebook did not have similarly expensive expansion plans but still attracted international users at a rapid rate. The changes to MySpace's executive ranks were followed in June 2009 by a layoff of 37.5% of its workforce (including 30% of its U.S. employees), reducing employees from 1,600 to 1,000.

The downfall of MySpace can be attributed to different factors. One factor was the demographic of MySpace and how they reacted to the debut of Facebook. When MySpace was launched, many of its users were people who had limited experience using the internet. As time went on, these users became frustrated with the limited features of MySpace. Facebook launched with various quality of life features that MySpace did not have. As a result, a significant number of MySpace users gradually migrated from MySpace to Facebook.

According to Tim Vanderhook, the CEO of MySpace when it was owned by Viant, MySpace was killed by a "calculated takedown by Google over music". Vanderhook alleges that Google used their recent acquisition of YouTube to take away a lot of the music deals they otherwise would have gotten by getting artists to put music on YouTube instead of MySpace. This utterly crippled MySpace as they had come to rely on the content of musical artists. Vanderhook also alleges that Google used their search engine algorithm to steer users away from MySpace and towards YouTube.

In 2009, MySpace implemented site redesigns as a way to get users back. However, this may have backfired, as users generally disliked tweaks and changes on Facebook.

In March 2011, market research figures released by Comscore suggested that Myspace had lost 10 million users between January and February 2011, and had fallen from 95 million to 63 million unique users in the previous 12 months. Myspace registered its sharpest audience declines in February 2011, as traffic fell 44% from a year earlier to 37.7 million U.S. visitors. Advertisers were reported as unwilling to commit to long-term deals with the site.

In late February 2011, News Corporation officially put the site up for sale for an estimated $50–200 million. Losses from the last quarter of 2010 were $156 million, over double the previous year, which dragged down the otherwise strong results of News Corporation. The deadline for bids, May 31, 2011, passed without any above the reserve price of $100 million being submitted. It has been said that the decline in users during the most recent quarter deterred several potential suitors.

On June 29, 2011, Myspace announced in an email to label partners and press that it had been acquired by Specific Media for an undisclosed sum, which was rumored to be as low as $35 million. CNN reported that the site sold for $35 million, and noted that it was "far less than the $580 million News Corp. paid for Myspace in 2005." Murdoch went on to call the Myspace purchase a "huge mistake", and Time magazine compared it to Time Warner's 2000 purchase of AOL, which saw a conglomerate trying to stay ahead of the competition. Many former executives have gone on to further success after departing Myspace.

=== 2016–2019: Time Inc. and Meredith Corporation ownership ===
On February 11, 2016, it was announced that Myspace and its parent company had been bought by Time Inc. On January 31, 2018, Time Inc. was in turn purchased by Meredith Corporation, who went on to sell a number of Time Inc.'s assets, including (as it announced on November 4, 2019) selling its equity in Viant, the parent company of Specific Media, back to Viant Technology Holding Inc.

In May 2016, the data for almost 360 million Myspace accounts was offered on TheRealDeal dark market website, which included email addresses, usernames, and weakly encrypted passwords (SHA1 hashes of the first 10 characters of the password converted to lowercase and stored without a cryptographic salt). The exact data breach date is unknown, but analysis of the data suggests it was exposed around eight years before being made public, around mid-2008 to early 2009.

=== Since 2019: Viant Technology Holding Inc. ownership ===
In March 2019, Myspace lost all content before 2016 after a faulty server migration.

The terms of service of Myspace have not been changed by Viant. The privacy policy was last revised on June 24, 2024.

As of October 5, 2024, Myspace was placed in a read-only mode. Most images on the site are broken, and existing songs also could not be played. As of 2026, most Myspace articles are SPIN news reports. In a 2026 interview, the Vanderhook brothers said they lost "a little over $150 million" during their ownership of Myspace but have kept the brand for a potential future relaunch.

Analysts warned that a revived Myspace would face significant competition from established platforms including Instagram, TikTok, Snapchat, YouTube and Reddit, and would need to attract both users and advertisers while adapting to changing preferences for more private and less algorithm-driven social experiences.

== Features ==
From YouTube's founding in 2005, Myspace users could embed YouTube videos in their profiles. Considering this a competitive threat to its new Myspace Videos service, the site in late 2005 banned embedded YouTube videos from user profiles, which was widely protested by Myspace users, prompting the site to lift the ban shortly after.

There were a variety of environments in which users could access Myspace content on their mobile phones. In early 2006, mobile phone provider Helio released a series of mobile phones utilizing a service known as Myspace Mobile to access and edit one's profile and communicate with and view the profiles of other members. Additionally, UIEvolution and Myspace developed a mobile version of Myspace for a wider range of carriers, including AT&T, Vodafone and Rogers Wireless. In August 2006, Myspace began offering classified ads, a service which grew by 33 percent during the following year. It previously had an instant messaging tool called MySpace IM. Myspace used an implementation of Telligent Community for its forum system.

=== Music ===
Shortly after Myspace was sold to News Corporation in 2005, the website launched a record label called MySpace Records in an effort to discover unknown talent on Myspace Music, a service onto which artists can upload songs, EPs and full-length albums. As of June 2014, over 53 million songs had been uploaded to the site by 14.2 million artists. Artists including My Chemical Romance, Nicki Minaj, Lily Allen, Taylor Swift, Lady Gaga, and Katy Perry gained fame and recognition through Myspace. As of 2010 over eight million artists were hosted by the site. In late 2007, the site launched The MySpace Transmissions, a series of live-in-studio recordings by well-known artists.

On March 18, 2019, it was revealed that Myspace had lost all of its user content from launch until 2015 in a botched server migration with no backup. Over 50 million songs and 12 years' worth of content were permanently lost. In April 2019, the Internet Archive recovered 490,000 MP3s "using unknown means by an anonymous academic study conducted between 2008 and 2010". The songs, which were uploaded between 2008 and 2010, are collectively known as the "MySpace Dragon Hoard".

Since early 2022, music upload and playback have been disabled on the website. The Myspace Music page still presents as though songs can be played, however the playback doesn't work.

=== MySpaceTV ===
On May 16, 2007, Myspace partnered with news publications National Geographic, the New York Times and Reuters to provide professional visual contents on its social-networking Web site. On June 27, 2007, Myspace launched MySpaceTV.

On August 8, 2007, Myspace partnered with satire publication The Onion to provide audio, video and print content to the site.

On October 22, 2007, Myspace launched its first original web series, Roommates, which intended to give its users a television-like experience with the interactive benefits of the Internet.

On February 27, 2008, TMZ launched its web channel on MySpaceTV.

On April 21, 2008, Myspace signed a deal with Byron Allen's Entertainment Studios that brought programming such as the syndicated series Comics Unleashed with Byron Allen, Entertainers with Byron Allen, Beautiful Homes and Great Estates, and Designer Fashions & Runways to MySpaceTV.

=== Redesigns ===
On March 10, 2010, Myspace added new features including a recommendation engine for new users that suggests games, music and videos based on their previous search habits. The security on Myspace was also enhanced, with the criticism of Facebook, to make it a safer site. The security of Myspace enables users to choose if the content could be viewed for "friends only", "18 and older" or "everyone".

In October 2010, Myspace introduced a beta version of a new site design on a limited scale, with plans to switch all interested users to the new site in late November. Chief executive Mike Jones said the site was no longer competing with Facebook as a general social networking site; instead, it would be music-oriented and would target younger people. Jones believed most younger users would continue to use the site after the redesign, though older users might not. The goal of the redesign was to increase the number of Myspace users and the time they spent on the site. BTIG (.com) analyst Richard Greenfield said, "Most investors have written off MySpace now," and was unsure whether the changes would help the company recover.

In November 2010, Myspace changed its logo to coincide with the new site design. The word "my" appears in the Helvetica font, followed by a symbol representing a space. The logo change was announced on October 8, 2010, and appeared on the site on November 11. In the same month, Myspace integrated with Facebook Connect – calling it "Mash Up with Facebook" in an announcement widely seen as the final act of acknowledging Facebook's domination of social networking.

In January 2011, it was announced that the Myspace staff would be reduced by 47%. User adoption continued to decrease.

In September 2012, a new redesign was announced, with no date given, making Myspace more visual and apparently optimized for tablets. The redesign was publicly released on January 15, 2013; by April 2013 (and presumably before), users were able to transfer to the new Myspace redesign. In June 2013, the redesign deleted all previous blogs, angering many users, and destroying information that would have been useful history in later years.

== Key executives ==
Name	Role	Years
Chris DeWolfe	Co-Founder, CEO	2003–2009
Tom Anderson	Co-Founder, President	2003–2009
Aber Whitcomb	CTO	2003–2009
Josh Berman	COO	2003–2008
Travis Katz	SVP, Head of International	2005–2009
Amit Kapur	COO VP, Business Development	2008–2009 2006–2009
Jamie Kantrowitz	SVP, International Marketing	2004–2009
Shawn Gold	SVP, Marketing	2006–2007
Jeff Berman	President, Sales & Marketing VP Communications & Policy	2007–2009 2006–2007
Dani Dudeck	VP Communications	2006–2010
Steve Pearman	SVP, Strategy	2005–2009
Tom Andrus	SVP Product	2007–2009

== Corporate information ==
=== Foreign versions ===
Since early 2006, Myspace has offered the option to access the service in different regional versions. The alternative regional versions present automated content according to locality (e.g., UK users see other UK users as "Cool New People", and UK-oriented events and adverts, etc.), offer local languages other than English, or accommodate the regional differences in spelling and conventions in the English-speaking world (e.g., United States: "favorites", mm/dd/yyyy; the rest of the world: "favourites", dd/mm/yyyy).

=== MySpace Developer Platform (MDP) ===
On February 5, 2008, MySpace set up a developer platform allowing developers to share their ideas and write their own Myspace applications. The opening was inaugurated with a workshop at the MySpace offices in San Francisco two weeks before the official launch. The MDP is based on the OpenSocial API, which was presented by Google in November 2007 to support social networks to develop social and interacting widgets, and can be seen as an answer to Facebook's developer platform. The first public beta of the MySpace Apps was released on March 5, 2008, with around 1,000 applications available.

=== Myspace server infrastructure ===
At QCon London 2008, MySpace Chief Systems Architect Dan Farino indicated that the site was sending 100 gigabits of data per second out to the Internet; 10 gigabits of which was HTML content and the remainder was media such as videos and pictures. The server infrastructure consists of over 4,500 web servers (running Windows Server 2003, IIS 6.0, ASP.NET and .NET Framework 3.5), over 1,200 cache servers (running 64-bit Windows Server 2003), and over 500 database servers (running 64-bit Windows Server 2003 and SQL Server 2005), as well as a custom distributed file system which runs on Gentoo Linux.

In 2009, MySpace began migrating from HDD to SSD technology in some of their servers, resulting in space and power usage savings.

=== Revenue model ===
Myspace operates solely on revenues generated by advertising, as its revenue model possesses no user-paid features. Through its site and affiliated advertising networks, the site collects data about its users and utilizes behavioral targeting to select the ads each visitor sees.

On August 8, 2006, search engine Google signed a $900 million deal to provide a search facility and advertising on MySpace.

=== Third-party content ===
Companies such as Slide.com and RockYou were all launched on Myspace as widgets providing additional functionality to the site. Other sites created layouts to personalize the site and made hundreds of thousands of dollars for its owners, most of whom were in their late teens and early twenties.

In November 2008, MySpace announced that user-uploaded content infringing on copyrights held by MTV and its subsidiary networks would be redistributed with advertisements to generate revenue for the companies.

=== Acquisition of Imeem ===
On November 18, 2009, MySpace Music acquired Imeem for less than $1 million. MySpace stated that they would be transitioning Imeem's users and migrating their playlists over to MySpace Music. On January 15, 2010, MySpace began restoring Imeem playlists.

== Mobile application ==
Along with its website redesign in June 2013, Myspace also completely redesigned their mobile application on the App Store. The app featured a tool for users to create and edit gif images and post them to their Myspace stream. The app also allowed users to stream available "live streams" of concerts. New users were able to join Myspace from the app by signing in with Facebook or Twitter or by signing up with email.

=== Availability ===
Location	Size	Available	Price	Version	Device requirement	Last update
App Store	15.6 MB	No	Free	3.6.2	iOS 6.1 or greater	February 8, 2014
Google Play	16 MB	No	Free	3.1.0	Android 4.1 or greater	April 17, 2015

The Myspace mobile app is no longer available on the Google Play Store or the Apple App Store. The mobile web app can be accessed by visiting Myspace.com from a mobile device. However, the mobile web version is limited compared to the PC, for example, it is not yet possible to display a person's bio.

=== Radio ===
The app once allowed users to play Myspace radio channels from the device. Users could select from genre stations, featured stations and user or artist stations. A user could build their own station by connecting and listening to songs on Myspace's desktop website. The user was given six skips per station. As of early 2022, the radio player no longer functions on Myspace.com.

== See also ==
- Christou v. Beatport, LLC, a US federal district court case which held that Myspace profiles could be held as trade secrets
- Criticism of Myspace
- Doe v. MySpace Inc., a court case that held that Myspace was immune from liability resulting from a sexual assault of a minor.
- gOS 2.9 "Space" – Linux distribution geared toward Myspace users, see gOS (operating system)
- List of Internet phenomena
- List of social networking websites
- MyDeathSpace
- MySpace angle, a photographic style associated to MySpace profile pictures
- Myspace IM
- The MySpace Movie
- MySpace Records
- Social software
- SodaHead.com
- SpaceHey, a Myspace revival
- Vine (service)
- Web 2.0 Suicide Machine
