= Field Trip (application) =

- Developer: Niantic Labs
- Release: September 27, 2012; 14 years ago
- Final release: 2.0.9 / May 13, 2015; 11 years ago
- Operating system: Android, iOS, Google Glass, Android Wear
- Website: fieldtripper.com

Field Trip was a location-based mobile app developed by Niantic Labs for the Google Glass, Android, and iOS devices. The application was first released in September 2012 and utilized user location and various databases to provide information and recommendations about various points of interest in their surroundings.

== Overview ==
Field Trip acted as a "virtual tour guide"–using the user's location to recommend nearby landmarks and various points of interest, providing information about them ranging from historical tidbits to restaurant reviews. Upon approaching such points of interest, in-app "cards" would pop up with information regarding the location. The application also allowed its users to customize the app's features, whether it to adjust the frequency of notifications or to prefer certain types of locations.

The application used GPS and cellular signals to determine the user's location, although in some cases triangulation from radio towers and Wi-Fi emitters are used to conserve battery life. In order to obtain information regarding the landmarks and points of interest, the project's developers relied on external partners like Atlas Obscura, Thrillist, Scoutmob and Dezeen in addition to internal Google structures such as Zagat. In an August 2013 interview with CNN, Hanke mentioned that the application gathered information from 130 databases.

== Development ==
Following the acquisition of his company Keyhole, John Hanke created Niantic Labs within Google as something resembling a startup within the latter's structure. Hanke wanted users to "explore the beautiful stuff around them." The application was developed with hardware like Google Glass in mind. Field Trip was the first application released by Niantic.

In August 2014, Google announced Field Trip's functionality was integrated into Google Now, although the standalone application remained. Points of interest collected within the app were used in later applications by the developer, such as Ingress.

=== Release ===
The first version of the app was released exclusively for the United States on September 27, 2012 for Android phones, with a release for the United Kingdom in December that year. An iOS version was released in March 2013. By May 2013, the release had been expanded to include 80 countries with support for 30 languages. In August 2013, a version was released for Google Glass as a simpler version of the smartphone app. Android Wear versions were released in 2015.

Niantic announced in July 2019 that Field Trip would be shutting down later in 2019. The company mentioned the possibility of a reimagined version of the app in the future.
