= Pokémon Go live events =

Real-life gatherings of Pokémon Go

Since the release of the augmented reality (AR) mobile game Pokémon Go in 2016, multiple real-life events and gatherings have been held by its developer, Niantic Labs, outside unofficial player gatherings. Typically, these events offer increased in-game rewards to participating players and often involve cooperation with local organizations or governments.

The common recurring events include the annual Pokémon Go Fest, the Pokémon Go Safari Zone, which has been held in multiple countries, and the monthly "Community Day" events. Larger events attract player counts ranging from thousands to as many as two million participants in a single event. The high concentration of players using mobile devices at these events has caused incidents and network disruptions, ultimately resulting in lawsuits against Niantic.

Niantic estimated that Pokémon Go live events generated approximately $249 million in tourism revenue in 2019, including $120 million in Chicago, $71 million in Montreal, and $56 million in Dortmund.

== Background ==
=== Pokémon Go ===
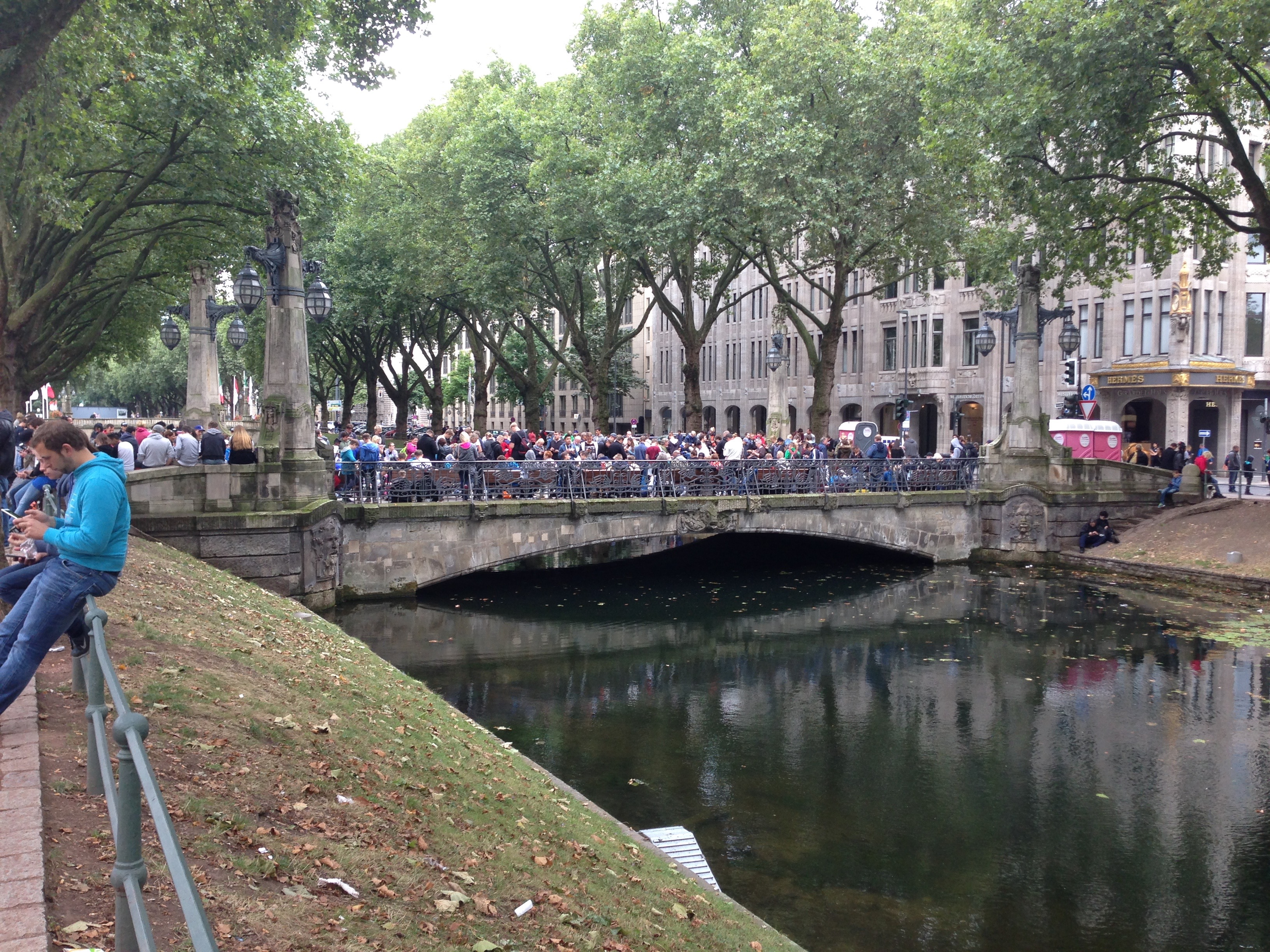
A gathering of Pokémon Go players in Düsseldorf, Germany, in August 2016

Pokémon Go (stylized as Pokémon GO) is an augmented reality mobile game developed by Niantic Labs, based on the Pokémon franchise of Game Freak, which began to release in July 2016. The game centers around catching various Pokémon creatures by navigating the in-game map based on the player's actual location and nearby landmarks. Shortly after its release, the game went viral, breaking multiple records and being installed on millions of devices within weeks of its initial release. With the game's massive initial player base, landmarks would gather crowds of players taking advantage of the "Pokéstops" which provide players with items, to the point where certain landmarks, such as the United States Holocaust Memorial Museum and the Arlington National Cemetery, explicitly requested players to not play the game within the grounds. On the other hand, the traffic generated by the game was capitalized on by some local businesses.

During the first weeks after the game's release, multiple events and gatherings organized by the players happened across the world. Examples include a single gathering in Sydney days after the game's launch, which attracted over 2,000 players, and a Facebook-based bar crawl in San Francisco for the game collected thousands of responses and a significant number of attendees. Another player gathering at Chicago's Millennium Park gathered around 5,000 players. A zoo in Bristol, which held a Go event, received more attendance than its capacity and had to turn away players.

Several months after release, the player count for the game declined, losing some one-third of its peak of 45 million active users by mid-August 2016. Niantic held the first in-game event—where different Pokémon are encountered in the game and players receive increased rewards—on Halloween of 2016, and the revenue generated by the game spiked during the period. Go had numerous more in-game events that year, including on Thanksgiving Day and Christmas. In one November 2016 event, Niantic increased the spawn rate of the otherwise rare Pokémon Lapras in areas affected by the 2011 Tōhoku earthquake and tsunami, intended to help recover tourism in the area.

Shortly after Go's release, during an interview with Recode, Niantic CEO John Hanke stated that Niantic intended to hold official events due to their experience with their previous game, Ingress. He stated that the intent of the events for Go would be to have "people coming together, having an event that moves you through an interesting part of the city so it's part walking tour, part competition, and then having a big get-together at the end where we're announcing winners [and] leaderboards." He also added that the lack of events in the early stages of the game was to ensure that Niantic could handle the expected large crowds at such events.

=== Ingress events ===
Prior to the release of Go, Niantic had developed and released a similar AR game called Ingress. A component of Ingress is a series of real-life events held directly by Niantic across multiple cities. Its first post-beta event series, held in 2013, spanned over 9 weeks and involved 39 cities worldwide. The Pokémon Company (TPC) CEO Tsunekazu Ishihara was also an Ingress player, which, according to Hanke, eased cooperation between Niantic and TPC for Go.

One type of Ingress event is known as "Anomalies", where gathered players in a specific location attempt to control the landmarks to score points for their factions, with clear victory objectives. Anomalies can have attendances of upwards of 1,000 players, and Hanke noted in the 2016 Recode interview that an event in Japan gathered over 10,000. Additionally, Ingress also holds monthly "First Saturday" events and #NL1331 meetups (involving a mobile van).

== Pokémon Go Fest ==
=== 2017 ===
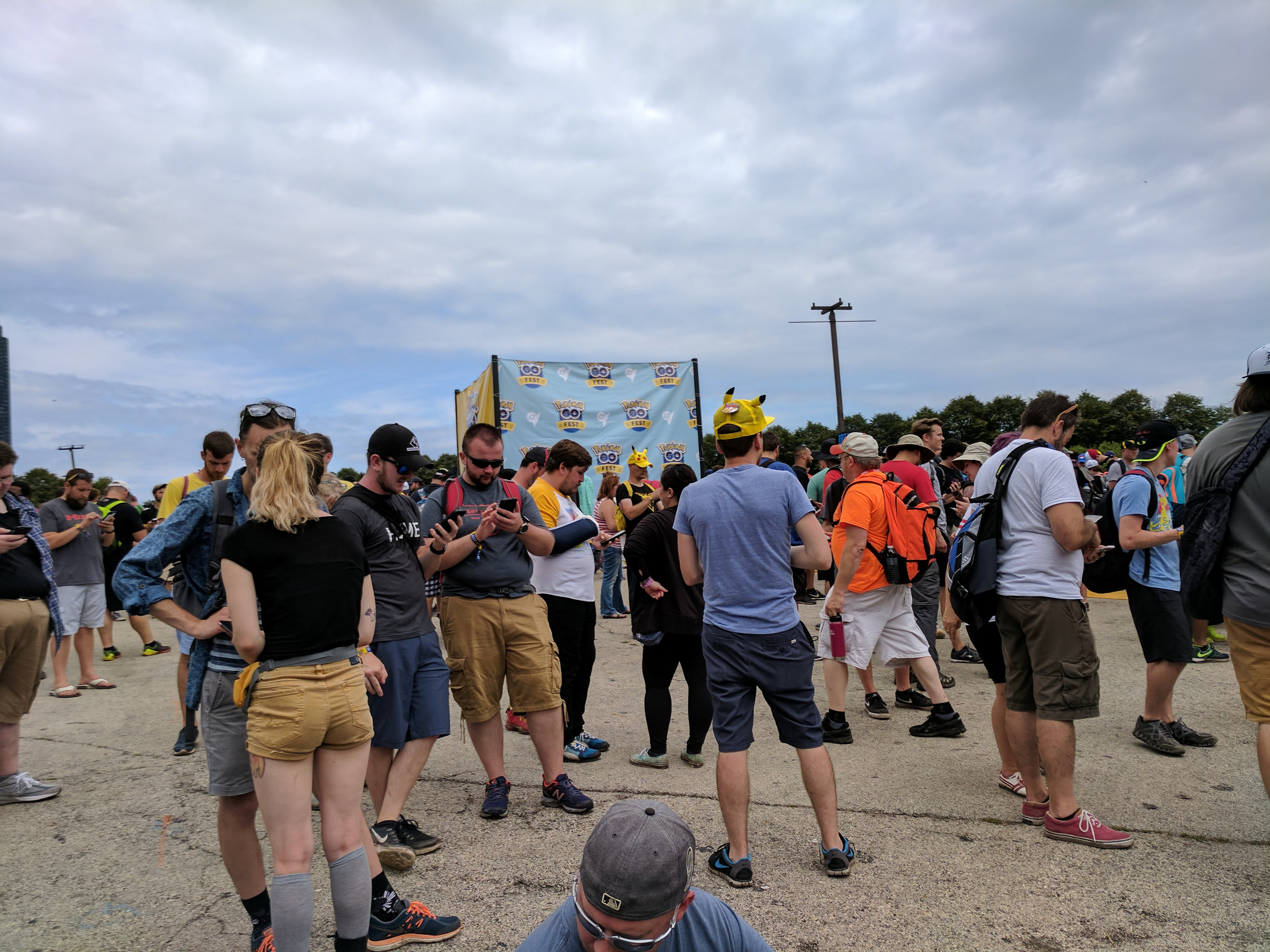
Players in Grant Park during Pokémon Go Fest 2017

In June 2017, Niantic announced a new "Pokémon Go Fest" event, which was held in Chicago's Grant Park on 22 July 2017 as the game's first official real-life event. Tickets to the event, priced at US$20, were sold out within fifteen minutes of their release for sale, despite the details of the event not having been revealed then. Scalpers were reported to have attempted to resell the tickets through resellers for inflated prices. Later, it was revealed that players worldwide and players at Grant Park would contribute towards a catching target, which would unlock rewards.

On the date of the event itself, The Chicago Tribune estimated that 20,000 players attended, some having traveled across the United States or even from abroad. During the event itself, however, mobile networks in the park overloaded, resulting in the attendees being nearly unable to play the game. Niantic acknowledged the issue by around 2 p.m., and its CEO Hanke was booed when speaking on stage in front of the players. In an attempt to alleviate the network pressure, Niantic extended the in-game event area to two miles outside of Grant Park and continued the event throughout the weekend. The event at Grant Park ended on 5 p.m. local time, two hours before it was scheduled. Multiple media outlets called the event a "disaster". A spokesperson from Niantic remarked that the company's staff were "horrified" with the outcome of the event.

Immediately after the event, Niantic refunded the tickets of the attendees, in addition to giving their accounts US$100 worth of in-game currency and the legendary Pokémon Lugia, meant to have been released during the event. Niantic released a blog post by Hanke the following day, blaming both technical issues with the game—which were resolved according to the post—and network oversaturation due to insufficient availability of mobile cell sites. Also, according to the blog post, 7.7 million Pokémon were captured by players in downtown Chicago during the ensuing weekend. In a 2018 interview with The Guardian, Hanke remarked that "the first six hours of [Pokémon Go Fest] were among the most challenging of my professional life."

Later on, a Go Fest attendee, Jonathan Norton, filed a class action lawsuit in the Circuit Court of Cook County against Niantic. The lawsuit was settled after Niantic agreed to pay US$1.575 million to compensate for non-ticket fees such as accommodation and transportation.

=== 2018 ===
Despite the outcome of the 2017 Go Fest, Niantic announced a second Go Fest to be held again in Chicago, at Lincoln Park, on 7 May 2018. Unlike the previous Fest, the event was held across two days—14 and 15 July. The area allocated for the event was larger, with attendees being limited to one of the two days, and additional temporary cellular network facilities were provided by major providers. Like in 2017, tickets for the event sold out rapidly, with tickets running out on the official website within half an hour and scalpers reselling the tickets for increased prices.

During the event, Lincoln Park was decorated with props resembling various biomes that could be found in the game. As part of the event, Pokémon that are normally rare or only found in other parts of the world spawned in the area. Attendees were also given a chance to complete "Research Quests" in-game in order to encounter the Mythical Pokémon Celebi. According to Niantic, 21,000 people attended the event in Lincoln Park, with an additional 180,000 players in Chicago. The event was seen as largely successful, with relatively few technical difficulties in contrast to the 2017 event.

=== 2019 ===
A third Go Fest event was announced on 4 April 2019. The 2019 event, unlike the preceding ones, was to be held in three separate cities—Chicago (Grant Park, held between 13 and 16 June), Dortmund (Westfalenpark, held between 4–7 July) and Yokohama (Yamashita Park, Rinko Park, and Akarenga Park, held between 6–12 August). In the lead-up to the events, Niantic held a "Pokémon Go Snapshot Challenge", centered around the game's augmented reality camera feature, with the contest's main prizes being trips to the Go Fest events. Tickets for the Chicago event were distributed through a random drawing that followed in-game registration.

Niantic reported around 60,000 attendees at the Chicago event. The reported player count in Dortmund was 85,000 in the Westfalenpark across the four days, and 150,000 players participated in Yokohama.

=== 2020–2023 ===
In 2020, due to the COVID-19 pandemic, which limited the capacity for in-person gatherings, Niantic opted for a fully online Go Fest, holding the event worldwide and enabling players to participate in the event at home. It was held on 25—26 July 2020.

The 2021 Go Fest was held on 17–18 July, with a lower ticket price of $5. With the pandemic's impact having lessened in parts of the world, the 2021 Go Fest involved at-home events still, but also a number of real-life gatherings in 21 cities across the United States and Europe. Unlike events in 2017–2019, which saw Niantic set up many Pokémon-themed builds across the parks, the 2021 events were described as having "a lighter touch", with the locations intended to be more spread out. Each of the 21 locations was still staffed by Niantic personnel. (Note: The locations were: San Francisco, Denver, Atlanta, Chicago, Indianapolis, New York City, Seattle, Washington, D.C., Nashville, Tennessee, Austin, Texas, Linz, Dresden, Essen, Hamburg, Sevilla, Paris, Warsaw, Bristol, Edinburgh, Liverpool, and London. Auckland, New Zealand was also slated to hold an event, but it was cancelled due to extreme weather.) A special "raid egg" display was set up at Maggie Daley Park in Chicago, in reference to the first Go Fest held in the city.

The global part of the 2022 Go Fest was held 4–5 June, with a finale event on 27 August. A pink flower around the logo hinted that the mythical Pokémon Shaymin would make its Pokémon Go debut. It was officially confirmed later. There were also in-person events in three cities on different weekends: 1–3 July in Berlin, 22–24 July in Seattle, and 5–7 August in Sapporo.

The 2023 Go Fest had three cities with in-person events: 4–6 August in London and Osaka and 18–20 August in New York City, as well as a global event 26–27 August.

== Pokémon Go Safari Zone ==
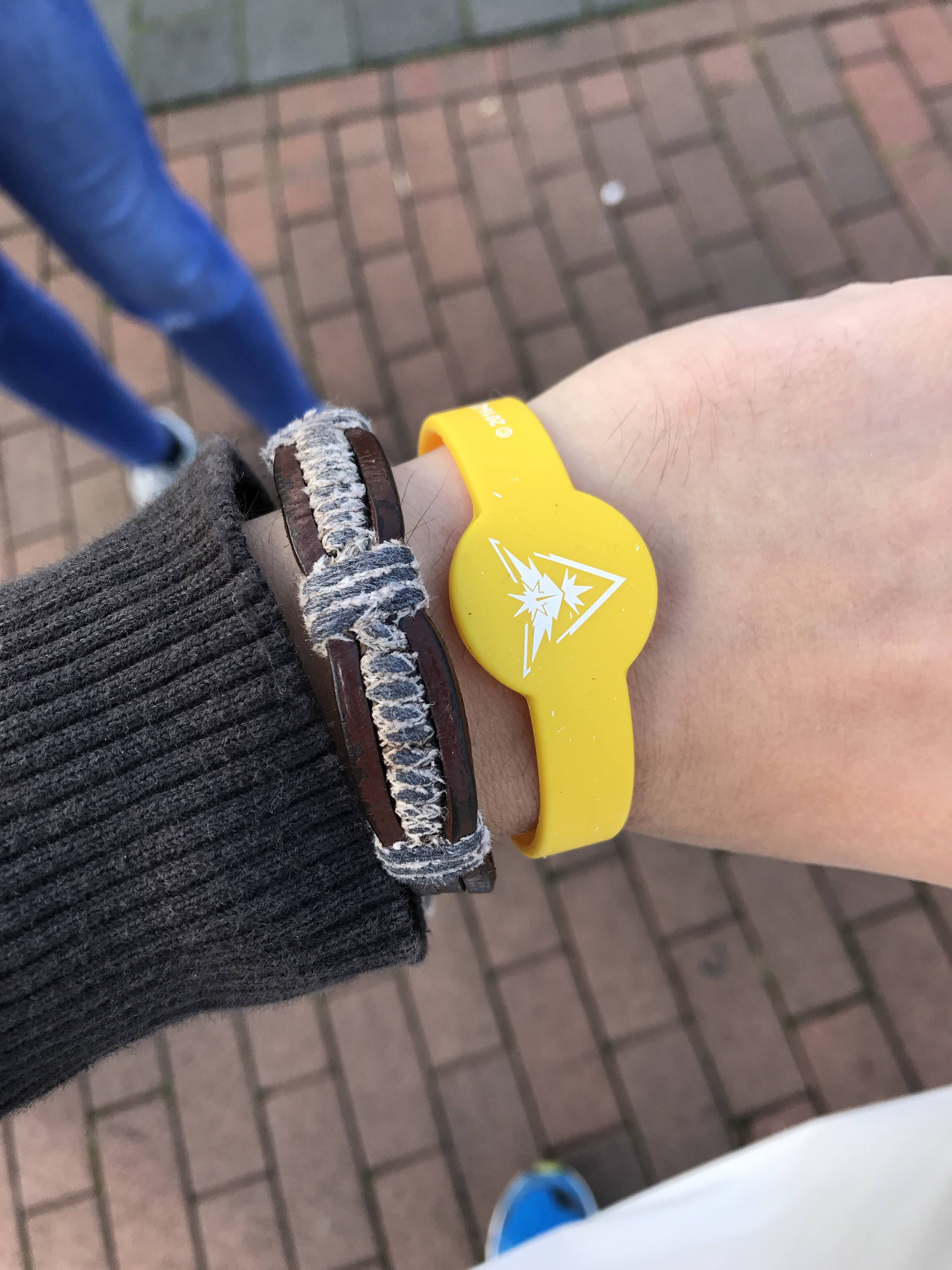
A gel bracelet handed out to attendees of the 2017 Safari Zone at CentrO in Oberhausen, Germany, signalling both attendance of the event and affiliation to one of the three ingame teams (here: Team Instinct)

On 12 July 2017, Niantic announced "Safari Zone" events across several cities in Europe at shopping centers operated by Unibail-Rodamco, held in August and September 2017. The events, where otherwise region-limited Pokémon could be found among others, required registration and had a player limit. For example, the event in Amsterdam was limited to 2,000 players, though unregistered players would still be able to play with increased rewards within the city. However, due to the failure of the 2017 Go Fest event, Niantic delayed some Safari Zone events to fall that year.

Later in 2017, another Safari Zone event was held in Tottori Prefecture, Japan, at the Tottori Sand Dunes between 24 and 26 November. According to the local government, 89,000 people attended the event, which generated around US$16 million in travel and tourism revenue. In the lead-up to the event, Niantic brought several influencers on a tour around Japan as a campaign, which was named Pokémon Go Travel.

The Summer 2018 iteration of the Safari Zone—announced in conjunction with the 2018 Go Fest as part of a "Summer Tour"—involved a Safari Zone event in Dortmund's Westfalenpark on 30 June and 1 July and another event in Yokosuka, Japan, on 29 August–2 September. The Dortmund event attracted some 170,000 players across the city, thrice the expected amount, with some players reporting network issues during the 2-day event.

Yokosuka's 2018 Safari Zone event, held in three parks, took up large portions of the city, with speakers playing Go's in-game music and businesses handing out Pokémon merchandise. Niantic reported that 65,000 players went to one of the three parks and that 200,000 users played in Yokosuka during the event.

A Safari Zone event was held in Chiayi County, Taiwan, between 26 February and 3 March 2018, during the Chiayi Lantern Festival. In total, around 200,000 players went to Chiayi—which had a population of around 500,000—for the event. Between 1 and 5 November 2018, another Safari Zone event was held in Tainan, Taiwan. While initially expected to have 200,000 attendees, the event ended up gathering 560,000 participants, with 80,000 during the last day (a Monday) alone. Around one-tenth of the figure were players from overseas, mainly from Japan and Hong Kong. The event, which generated an estimated NT$ 1.5 billion for the local economy, was the result of a cooperation between Niantic and the local government, though the former did not receive royalties.

The first Safari Zone event of 2019 was held in Porto Alegre, Brazil, on 25 January. 130,000 players registered to join the event, though only 25,000 were granted tickets. The event was largely conducted alongside the banks of the Guaíba River. Niantic later also announced another Safari Zone, held between 18 and 22 April at Sentosa, Singapore. 125,000 tickets were issued, 20 percent of those to non-Singaporeans. After the event concluded, Niantic reported an attendance of 95,000 players. Between 20 and 22 September 2019, another Safari Zone event was held in Montreal, Canada, with an attendance of approximately 45,000 players. Tickets for the event were sold out in four hours. Another Taiwanese Safari Zone, held in New Taipei City between 3 and 6 October 2019, saw 100,000 players on the first day and 150,000 on the second. The city's tourism and travel department estimates a NT$100 million profit generated by the event for local businesses. Around 40 percent of the attendees came from outside Taiwan.

For 2020, Safari Zone events were scheduled to be held in St. Louis (27–29 March), Liverpool (17–19 April), and Philadelphia (8–10 May). However, all three Safari Zone events were postponed due to the ongoing coronavirus pandemic, with ticketholders receiving the Safari Zone experience in their own locales during the originally scheduled dates. The new dates were 15–17 October 2021 for Liverpool, 29–31 October for Philadelphia, and 12–14 November for St. Louis. 20,000 players attended the in-person event at Sefton Park, in Liverpool, with thousands also attending the events at Tower Grove Park, St. Louis, and Fairmount Park, Philadelphia.

In 2022 there were scheduled Safari Zone events in Seville, Spain, 13–15 May at Alamillo Park; in Goyang, South Korea, 23–25 September at Ilsan Lake Park; in Taipei, Taiwan, 21–23 October at Daan Forest Park; and in Singapore 18–20 November in Gardens by the Bay.

== Community Days ==
Community Days are monthly worldwide in-game events where certain Pokémon species spawn in large amounts. An evolution of the featured Pokémon can learn an exclusive event move, which is generally stronger than its normal moves. There are also bonuses like more rewards or time for certain activities. Community Days are intended to draw players together, especially in major cities, and the events drew crowds in hotspots such as Seattle's Green Lake and Brighton and Hove's Hove Park.

The first Community Day was "Pikachu day" on 20 January 2018. In January 2022, Niantic introduced Community Day Classic, a second Community Day bringing back a previously featured Pokémon and the three-hour event duration seen pre-pandemic, but with the bonus benefits introduced because of it. The April 2022 Community Day also reverted to a 3-hour total duration.

As of Pawniard on 21 November 2026, 97 Pokémon have been featured (eighteen of them twice and two thrice): Abra, Axew, Bagon (2), Beldum (2), Bellsprout, Bounsweet, Bulbasaur (2), Chansey, Charmander (3), Chespin, Chikorita, Chimchar, Cyndaquil (2), Deino (2), Dratini (2), Duskull, Eevee (3), Electabuzz, Fennekin, Flabébé, Fletchling, Frigibax, Froakie, Fuecoco, Gastly, Alolan Geodude, Gible (2), Goomy, Grookey, Grubbin, Hoppip, Jangmo-o, Karrablast, Larvitar (2), Lechonk, Litten, Litwick, Machop (2), Magikarp, Magmar, Mankey, Mareep (2), Mudkip (2), Nickit, Noibat, Oshawott, Pawmi, Pawniard, Pikachu, Pikipek, Piplup (2), Poliwag, Ponyta, Popplio, Porygon (2), Quaxly, Ralts (2), Rhyhorn, Roggenrola, Rookidee, Roselia, Rowlet, Sandshrew (both Alolan and Kantonian), Scorbunny, Seedot, Sewaddle, Shelmet, Shinx, Slakoth, Slowpoke, Snivy, Sobble, Solosis, Spheal, Sprigatito, Squirtle (2), Starly, Stufful, Swablu, Swinub (2), Teddiursa, Tepig, Timburr, Tinkatink, Togetic, Torchic, Totodile (2), Trapinch, Treecko, Turtwig, Tynamo, Vanillite, Vulpix (both Alolan and Kantonian), Weedle, Wooper, Galarian Zigzagoon, Zorua.

Date	Pokémon featured	Event Move	Ref
20 January 2018	Pikachu	Surf	
24 February 2018	Dratini (1)	Draco Meteor	
25 March 2018	Bulbasaur (1)	Frenzy Plant	
15 April 2018	Mareep (1)	Dragon Pulse	
19 May 2018	Charmander (1)	Blast Burn	
16 June 2018	Larvitar (1)	Smack Down	
8 July 2018	Squirtle (1)	Hydro Cannon	
11–12 August 2018	Eevee (1)	Last Resort	
22 September 2018	Chikorita	Frenzy Plant	
21 October 2018	Beldum (1)	Meteor Mash	
10 November 2018	Cyndaquil (1)	Blast Burn	
30 November – 2 December 2018	Previous Pokémon		
12 January 2019	Totodile (1)	Hydro Cannon	
16 February 2019	Swinub (1)	Ancient Power	
23 March 2019	Treecko	Frenzy Plant	
13 April 2019	Bagon (1)	Outrage	
19 May 2019	Torchic	Blast Burn	
8 June 2019	Slakoth	Body Slam	
21 July 2019	Mudkip (1)	Hydro Cannon	
3 August 2019	Ralts (1)	Synchronoise	
15 September 2019	Turtwig	Frenzy Plant	
12 October 2019	Trapinch	Earth Power	
16 November 2019	Chimchar	Blast Burn	
14–15 December 2019	11 Previous Pokémon		
19 January 2020	Piplup (1)	Hydro Cannon	
22 February 2020	Rhyhorn	Rock Wrecker	
~~15 March 2020~~	Postponed by COVID-19 pandemic		
25 April 2020	Abra	Counter	
24 May 2020	Seedot	Bullet seed	
20 June 2020	Weedle	Drill Run	
19 July 2020	Gastly	Shadow Punch	
8 August 2020	Magikarp	Aqua Tail	
20 September 2020	Porygon (1)	Tri Attack	
17 October 2020	Charmander (2)	Dragon Breath	
15 November 2020	Electabuzz	Flamethrower	
21 November 2020	Magmar	Thunderbolt	
12–13 December 2020	Previous Pokémon from 2019 and 2020	Previous	
16 January 2021	Machop (1)	Payback	
7 February 2021	Roselia	Bullet Seed (fast); Fire type Weather Ball (charged)	
6 March 2021	Fletchling	Incinerate	
11 April 2021	Snivy	Frenzy Plant	
15 May 2021	Swablu	Moonblast	
6 June 2021	Gible (1)	Earth Power	
3 July 2021	Tepig	Blast Burn	
14–15 August 2021	Eevee (2)	Same as July 2025	
19 September 2021	Oshawott	Razor Shell	
9 October 2021	Duskull	Shadow Ball	
23 November 2021	Shinx	Psychic Fangs	
18–19 December 2021	Previous Pokémon from 2020 (in raids and eggs) and 2021 (in wild)	Previous	
16 January 2022	Spheal	Powder Snow (fast); Icicle Spear (charged)	
22 January 2022 (Classic)	Bulbasaur (2)	Frenzy Plant	
12 February 2022	Hoppip	Acrobatics	
13 March 2022	Sandshrew and Alolan Sandshrew	Night Slash (charged, Sandslash); Shadow Claw (fast, Alolan Sandslash)	
10 April 2022 (Classic)	Mudkip (2)	Hydro Cannon	
23 April 2022	Stufful	Drain Punch	
21 May 2022	Alolan Geodude	Rollout	
25 June 2022	Deino (1)	Brutal Swing	
17 July 2022	Starly	Gust	
13 August 2022	Galarian Zigzagoon	Obstruct	
18 September 2022	Roggenrola	Meteor Beam	
15 October 2022	Litwick	Poltergeist	
5 November 2022 (Classic)	Dratini (2)	Draco Meteor	
12 November 2022	Teddiursa	High Horsepower	
17–18 December 2022	Previous Pokémon from 2021 and 2022	Previous	
7 January 2023	Chespin	Frenzy Plant	
21 January 2023 (Classic)	Larvitar (2)	Smack Down	
5 February 2023	Noibat	Boomburst	
18 March 2023	Slowpoke and Galarian Slowpoke	Surf	
15 April 2023	Togetic	Aura Sphere	
29 April 2023 (Classic)	Swinub (2)	Ancient Power	
21 May 2023	Fennekin	Blast Burn	
10 June 2023	Axew	Breaking Swipe	
9 July 2023 (Classic)	Squirtle (2)	Hydro Cannon	
23 July 2023 (makeup event)	Squirtle (2)	Hydro Cannon	
30 July 2023	Poliwag	Counter (fast, Poliwrath); Ice Beam (charged, Politoed)	
13 August 2023	Froakie	Hydro Cannon	
2 September 2023 (Classic)	Charmander (3)	Dragon Breath (fast); Blast Burn (charged)	
23 September 2023	Grubbin	Volt Switch	
15 October 2023	Timburr	Brutal Swing	
5 November 2023	Wooper and Paldean Wooper	Aqua Tail (Quagsire); Megahorn (Clodsire)	
25 November 2023 (Classic)	Mareep (2)	Dragon Pulse	
16–17 December 2023	Previous Pokémon from 2022 and 2023	Previous	
6 January 2024	Rowlet	Frenzy Plant	
20 January 2024 (Classic)	Porygon (2)	Tri Attack	
4 February 2024	Chansey	Wild Charge	
16 March 2024	Litten	Blast Burn	
7 April 2024 (Classic)	Bagon (2)	Outrage	
20 April 2024	Bellsprout	Magical Leaf	
19 May 2024	Bounsweet	High Jump Kick	
9 June 2024	Goomy	Thunder Punch	
22 June 2024 (Classic)	Cyndaquil (2)	Blast Burn	
21 July 2024	Tynamo	Volt Switch	
18 August 2024 (Classic)	Beldum (2)	Meteor Mash	
31 August 2024	Popplio	Hydro Cannon	
14 September 2024	Ponyta and Galarian Ponyta	Wild Charge	
5 October 2024	Sewaddle	Shadow Claw	
10 November 2024	Mankey	Rage Fist	
21–22 December 2024	Previous Pokémon from 2023 and 2024	Previous	
5 January 2025	Sprigatito	Frenzy Plant	
25 January 2025 (Classic)	Ralts (2)	Synchronoise	
9 February 2025	Karrablast and Shelmet	Razor Shell (Escavalier); Energy Ball (Accelgor)	
8 March 2025	Fuecoco	Blast Burn	
22 March 2025 (Classic)	Totodile (2)	Hydro Cannon	
27 April 2025	Vanillite	Avalanche	
11 May 2025	Pawmi	Brick Break	
24 May 2025 (Classic)	Machop (2)	Payback	
21 June 2025	Jangmo-o	Clanging Scales	
5–6 July 2025 (Classic)	Eevee (3)	Last Resort (Eevee); Scald (Vaporeon); Zap Cannon (Jolteon); Superpower (Flareon); Shadow Ball (Espeon); Psychic (Umbreon); Bullet Seed (Leafeon); Water Pulse (Glaceon); Psyshock (Sylveon)	
20 July 2025	Quaxly	Hydro Cannon	
30 August 2025	Rookidee	Air Cutter	
14 September 2025	Flabébé	Chilling Water	
12 October 2025	Solosis	Charm	
30 November 2025	Pikipek	Beak Blast	
6–7 December 2025	Previous Pokémon from 2025	Previous	
4 January 2026 (Classic)	Piplup (2)	Hydro Cannon	
18 January 2026	Grookey	Frenzy Plant	
1 February 2026	Vulpix and Alolan Vulpix	Energy Ball (Ninetales); Chilling Water (Alolan Ninetales)	
14 March 2026	Scorbunny	Blast Burn	
11 April 2026	Tinkatink	Gigaton Hammer	
9 May 2026	Lechonk	Mud Slap	
16 May 2026 (Classic)	Deino (2)	Brutal Swing	
20 June 2026	Frigibax	Glaive Rush	
4 July 2026	Sobble	Hydro Cannon	
15 August 2026	Nickit	Icy Wind	
12 September 2026 (Classic)	Gible (2)	Earth Power	
10 October 2026	Zorua	Sucker Punch	
21 November 2026	Pawniard	Kowtow Cleave	
12–13 December 2026	Previous Pokémon		
2 January 2027 (Classic)	TBA		
16 January 2027	TBA		
6 February 2027	TBA		

== Other events ==
Outside the events mentioned above, Niantic has held multiple one-off events, official or in cooperation with other organizations. On 7 May 2017, the first real-life event was held in Charlotte, North Carolina. The first such official Go event in Europe was held in Chester in the United Kingdom on 22–23 July 2017 during the annual Chester Heritage Festival in partnership with local non-profit Big Heritage. It was estimated that during the two days, between 16 and 18 thousand players visited the city.

Between 9 and 15 August 2017, during the Pikachu Outbreak event held by TPC, Niantic held Pokémon Go Park events in two parks within the city of Yokohama, Japan. On 14 August, during the aforementioned event, a Pokémon Go Stadium event was held at Yokohama Stadium in which thousands of players attempted to catch Mewtwo. The event was livestreamed. In total, during the seven days of the event, 2 million players participated in Yokohama, with the Pikachu Outbreak event overall recording 3 million participants, including the Go players. Due to the disruption to the city's traffic caused by the large numbers of attendees, Yokohama declined to host a Go event the following year.

In partnership with the Knight Foundation, an event was held in Akron, Ohio, on 26–27 August 2017. Niantic also partnered with the Viva Calle San Jose event on 17 September 2017, and a second iteration of the partnership was held on 23 September 2018. Go also held scavenger hunts in Philadelphia's 2017 Philly Free Streets and in Los Angeles in partnership with CicLAvia on 10 December 2017.

Held alongside the annual Pokémon Festa, between 4 and 12 November 2017 Go had an event held across South Korea. The event was repeated the following year, centered around the Lotte World Mall in Seoul, between 21 and 23 September 2018.

On Earth Day of April 2018, an "Earth Day Cleanup" event was launched, which rewarded players globally if sufficient players signed up to join cleanup events across 12 countries. Niantic reported over 4,200 players signing up with 6,600 kg of trash collected across 19 countries.
