= Tatsuo Nomura =

Japanese software developer

- Born: Shi Lei (石磊); 1986 (age 39–40); Heilongjiang, China
- Education: Shinshu University; Tokyo Institute of Technology
- Employer(s): Google (2011-2015); Niantic (since 2015)
- Known for: Pokémon Go director

Tatsuo Nomura (野村 達雄, Nomura Tatsuo; born 1986) is a Japanese software developer. Born in China with partial Japanese descent, he moved to Japan as a child and studied computer science. He worked in the Google Maps development team before moving to Niantic Labs, where he directed the augmented reality mobile game Pokémon Go.

== Early life and education ==
Nomura was born in 1986 and grew up as Shi Lei (Chinese: 石磊; pinyin: Shí Lěi) in a poor village in Heilongjiang of Northeast China. His paternal grandmother was a Japanese who remained in China after World War II and married a Chinese man. At the age of nine, his family moved to Japan and he settled in Nagano Prefecture, changing his name to Tatsuo Nomura. He initially could not converse in Japanese.

He studied computer engineering at Shinshu University and graduated in 2009. He continued his studies at the Tokyo Institute of Technology under the supervision of Satoshi Matsuoka. He wrote a paper on supercomputing which was well-received by American researchers, and he earned his master's degree in 2011.

== Career ==
After obtaining his master's, Nomura joined Google's Japan office in 2011 as an engineering staff, and became involved in the development of Google Maps among other projects. He was transferred to the American office in 2013. According to Nomura, he was involved in creating multiple April Fools' Day jokes for Google Maps, including "8-bit Google Maps" (2012) and a treasure hunt (2013).

=== Idea of Pokémon Go ===
In 2014, Nomura devised an idea to create a Google Maps April Fools' Day prank which would allow users to hunt Pokémon on their mobile devices. After securing a permission from The Pokémon Company (TPC), which shared an office complex with Google's Japan office, the prank was released in 2014. Nomura's involvement drew the attention of John Hanke, a former leader of the Google Maps division, who requested Nomura contact TPC once more to propose an augmented reality Pokémon game. After the negotiations completed, Nomura accepted an offer from Niantic Labs in 2015 to lead the development of the game which was to be called Pokémon Go. According to TPC president Tsunekazu Ishihara, Nomura was selected as lead due to "his diversity beyond nationality and borders".

At Niantic, Nomura works as a Senior Product Manager. He was initially an engineer for the game, but as the game's team expanded, he transitioned to product manager. He was also the director for the 2021 mobile game Pikmin Bloom and the director for the 2023 mobile game Monster Hunter Now.
