= Monster Hunter Now =

2023 mobile game

- Developers: Niantic (2023—2025); Scopely Explore (2025—present); Capcom
- Publishers: Niantic (2023—2025); Scopely (2025—present)
- Director: Tatsuo Nomura
- Series: Monster Hunter
- Platforms: iOS, Android
- Release: September 14, 2023
- Genres: Augmented reality, location-based game

Monster Hunter Now is a 2023 augmented reality mobile game in the Monster Hunter series, developed by Niantic and Capcom and published by Niantic for Android and iOS. It was released worldwide on September 14, 2023 and has accumulated 15 million downloads by 2024.

In 2025, ownership of the product was assumed by Scopely as part of a $3.5 billion acquisition of Niantic's gaming division.

== Gameplay ==
Monster Hunter Now uses the player's real-life location to place an avatar on the gameplay map, which is divided in-game into different types of terrain. Players can interact with small and large monsters on the map by tapping on them, triggering combat. Combat with large monsters is limited to 75 seconds (unlike in mainline Monster Hunter games, where fights may last up to 50 minutes), while smaller monsters generally require just several seconds to defeat. Resource nodes are also present in the map, allowing players to collect in-game resources to craft armor or weapons. Purchasable items allow player to temporarily increase their interaction range with the virtual environment. The game contains passive features, providing the player with some resources and marked large monsters for later combat when the game is not active.

On release, the game featured three different types of terrain (forest, swamp, and desert), along with six weapon types and 13 large monsters from the Monster Hunter series. The terrain map is refreshed every 24 hours, and available monsters vary depending on the terrain. A health system is present for players, with health regenerating over time or replenished by items which could be obtained daily at no cost or purchased from the in-game store. It also features an augmented reality camera mode.

== Development ==
Development for Monster Hunter Now began in 2019, following the opening of Niantic's Tokyo office. Niantic approached Capcom in order to use the Monster Hunter IP in its games, and received "on the spot" approval by the series' executive producer Ryozo Tsujimoto. Capcom had been looking for opportunities to expand the IP into mobile games when Niantic approached them. According to Niantic CEO John Hanke, improvements in mobile networks since the development of Niantic's prior games such as Pokémon Go allowed the development team to create faster-paced multiplayer battles.

Monster Hunter Now was publicly announced on April 18, 2023, with a closed beta test launching the following week. The game was released in early access on August 9, 2023, and in full on September 14 of the same year.

== Reception ==
According to Niantic, 3 million users had pre-registered for the game by September 11, 2023. Within a week of release, the game had been installed 5 million times. On 19 October, Niantic announced that the game had passed the 10 million downloads mark. While it performed better than other Niantic titles such as Pikmin Bloom (2 million downloads within its first two weeks), it still trailed behind Pokémon Go, which had been downloaded 75 million times within its first two weeks. Financially, both the announcement and release of Monster Hunter Now were met with surges in Capcom stock prices. Pocket Gamer reported that the game made USD 14 million in revenue within its first week of release.

Writing for The Verge, Andrew Webster praised the game's quality-of-life features and fast-paced and challenging combat, but criticized its lack of depth and variety.
