= Field trip (disambiguation) =

A field trip is a journey by a group of people to a place away from their normal environment, usually for education, personal enrichment, or research purposes.

Field trip may also refer to:

== Music ==
- Field Trip (band), a rock band from Pleasanton, California
- Field Trip (album), a 2000 album by Canadian folk rock band The Grapes of Wrath
- Field Trip, a 1954 album by Irish folk singer Sarah Makem
- Fieldtrip (album), a 1998 album by Quebec hard rock group GrimSkunk
- Field Trip, an album by the New Riders of the Purple sage originally released as Veneta, Oregon, 8/27/72
- "Field Trip", a song by ¥$ from their 2024 album Vultures 2
- "Field Trip", a song by Melanie Martinez from her 2020 deluxe album K-12

== Television ==
- Inspector Gadget's Field Trip, a spin-off incarnation of the animated series Inspector Gadget
- "Field Trip" (How I Met Your Mother), a seventh season episode of the CBS sitcom How I Met Your Mother
- "Field Trip" (The X-Files), a sixth-season episode of the science fiction series The X-Files
- The Field Trip (The Inbetweeners), a second series episode of the British sitcom The Inbetweeners
- The Field Trip (Vice Principals), an episode of the American TV series Vice Principals
- Field Trip (Hey Arnold!), a season 1 episode of Hey Arnold!
- "Field Trip", a season 1 episode of Ultimate Spider-Man

== Information technology ==
- Field Trip (application), a mobile augmented reality application by Niantic Labs
- FieldTrip, a MATLAB software toolbox for magnetoencephalography (MEG) and electroencephalography (EEG) analysis

== Other uses ==
- Fieldtrip (Teenagers from Outer Space), a 1987 adventure for the role-playing game Teenagers from Outer Space
