= Catan: World Explorers =

Location-based augmented reality mobile game

- Developers: Nerd Ninjas; Catan GmbH
- Publisher: Niantic
- Series: Catan
- Platforms: Android, iOS
- Genres: Augmented reality, location-based game

Catan: World Explorers was an augmented reality (AR) mobile game developed by Nerd Ninjas, and published by Niantic, based on the board game Settlers of Catan. It was announced in 2019, soft-launched in some countries the following year, and discontinued in November 2021.

== Development ==
In late October 2019, the publisher of Catan revealed during SPIEL 2019 in Essen that the company was developing a "massively multiplayer location based game". A promotional website was later released, which allows interested individuals to pre-register for the game. Niantic later confirmed its involvement in the development process following inquiries from media outlets, noting that the upcoming game was developed on its "Real World Platform". By June 2020, preregistration for the game had been opened.

In early July 2020, the game was soft launched in New Zealand.

On 1 October 2020, early access to the game was made available in Australia, Denmark, and Singapore. On 1 September 2020, Switzerland got early access to the game.

In September 2021, the development crew announced the game would be shutting down, citing difficulty in translating Catan into an MMO game. The game was removed from app stores and the servers shut down on 18 November 2021.

== Gameplay ==
According to the official website, players of the game are divided into teams which compete over time to earn "victory points". The game was promoted as having players developing settlements and roads while collecting resources (brick, lumber, grain, ore, and wool), with "matches" being competitive elements at the local or global levels being held in a "season". Like in prior Niantic AR games (such as Ingress and Pokémon Go), the game was set to be centered around real-world landmarks, where players could collect resources in-game.
