= Switchyards Building =

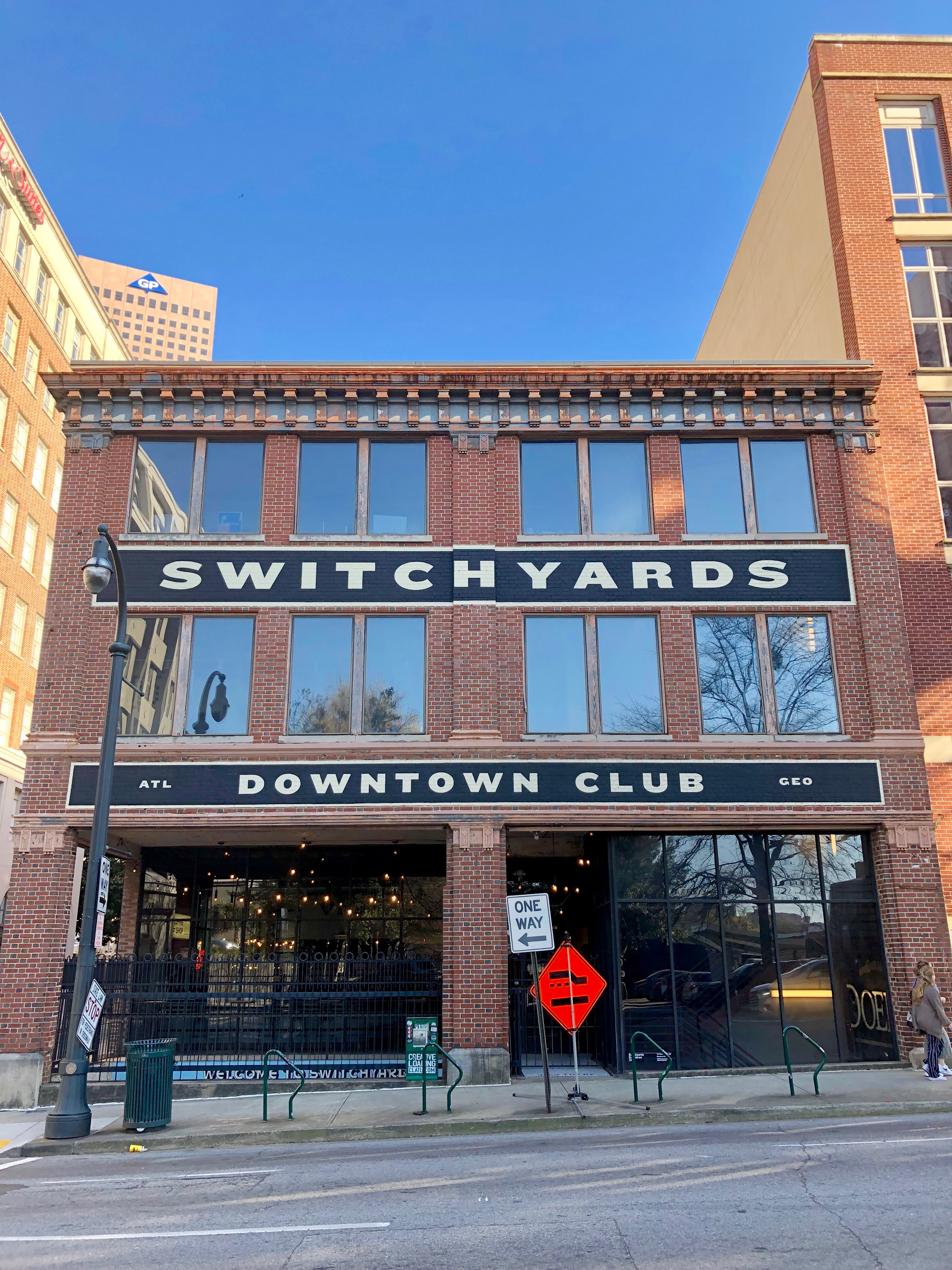
- Switchyards Building (2019)

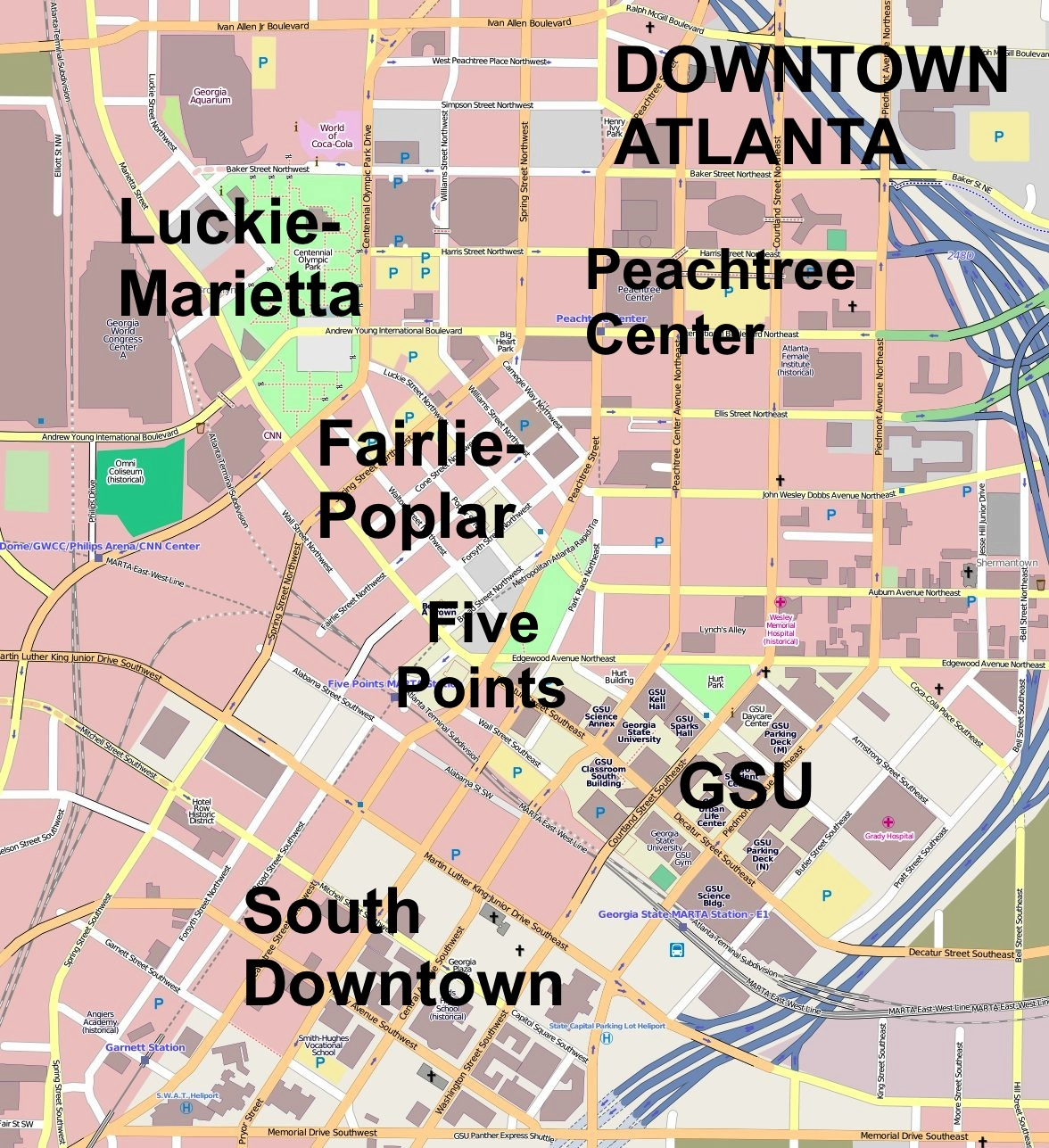
- Location within Downtown Atlanta Switchyards Building (Atlanta) Switchyards Building (Georgia) Switchyards Building (the United States)

General information
- Location: 151 Ted Turner Drive, Atlanta, Georgia, United States
- Coordinates: 33°45′31″N 84°23′24″W
- Completed: 1928

The Switchyards Building is a historic building in Atlanta, Georgia, United States. Located in Downtown Atlanta, the building was constructed in 1928 and currently houses a members-only coworking space.

== History ==
The building was constructed in 1928 during a boom in construction in the area following the completion of the Spring Street viaduct in 1923. Among the initial tenants in the building were a tire company and two printing companies. In 1944, the Lanier brothers moved two of their businesses into the building, a dictation machine company and Oxford Industries. While initially a manufacturer of military uniforms, the brothers converted Oxford into a general clothing company that, as of 2014, was one of the largest publicly traded companies based in Georgia.

In the early 1970s, the building served as offices for the United Services Organization, and the Atlanta Legal Aid Society moved into the building in 1979, though in 2013, they announced they were relocating.

In June 2014, Scoutmob cofounder Michael Tavani announced that he would be repurposing the building for use as a business incubator. The building was chosen over sites including Ponce City Market and the Flatiron Building, with Tavani claiming that $2 million would be invested in renovations. Tavani was joined by fellow Scoutmob cofounder Dave Payne the following year. The incubator, a coworking space called Switchyards Downtown Club, was opened in August 2016, in an opening ceremony attended by over 100 entrepreneurs and civic leaders, including Atlanta Mayor Kasim Reed.
