= Niantic, Inc. =

Mobile app and video game development company

- Formerly: Niantic Labs; (2010–2015)
- Type: Private
- Industry: Video games; Technology
- Genre: Mobile applications; mobile games; alternate reality games; augmented reality games; location-based games
- Founded: 2010; 16 years ago
- Founder: John Hanke
- Defunct: May 29, 2025
- Fate: Acquired by Scopely and spun off as Niantic Spatial
- Headquarters: San Francisco, California, U.S.
- Key people: John Hanke (CEO); Dennis Hwang (art director); Tatsuo Nomura (director)
- Products: See § Products
- Parent: Google (2010–2015)
- Website: nianticlabs.com

Niantic, Inc. (/naɪˈæntɪk/ ny-AN-tik) was an American software development company and video game developer based in San Francisco that developed augmented reality mobile games Ingress, Pokémon Go, Harry Potter: Wizards Unite, Pikmin Bloom, and Monster Hunter Now. The company was formed as Niantic Labs in 2010 as an internal startup within Google. The company became an independent entity in October 2015 when Google restructured under Alphabet Inc.

In 2025, Niantic was acquired by Scopely, with its team operating as Scopely Explore, and its non-video game business spun off as Niantic Spatial.

== History ==
=== Founding ===
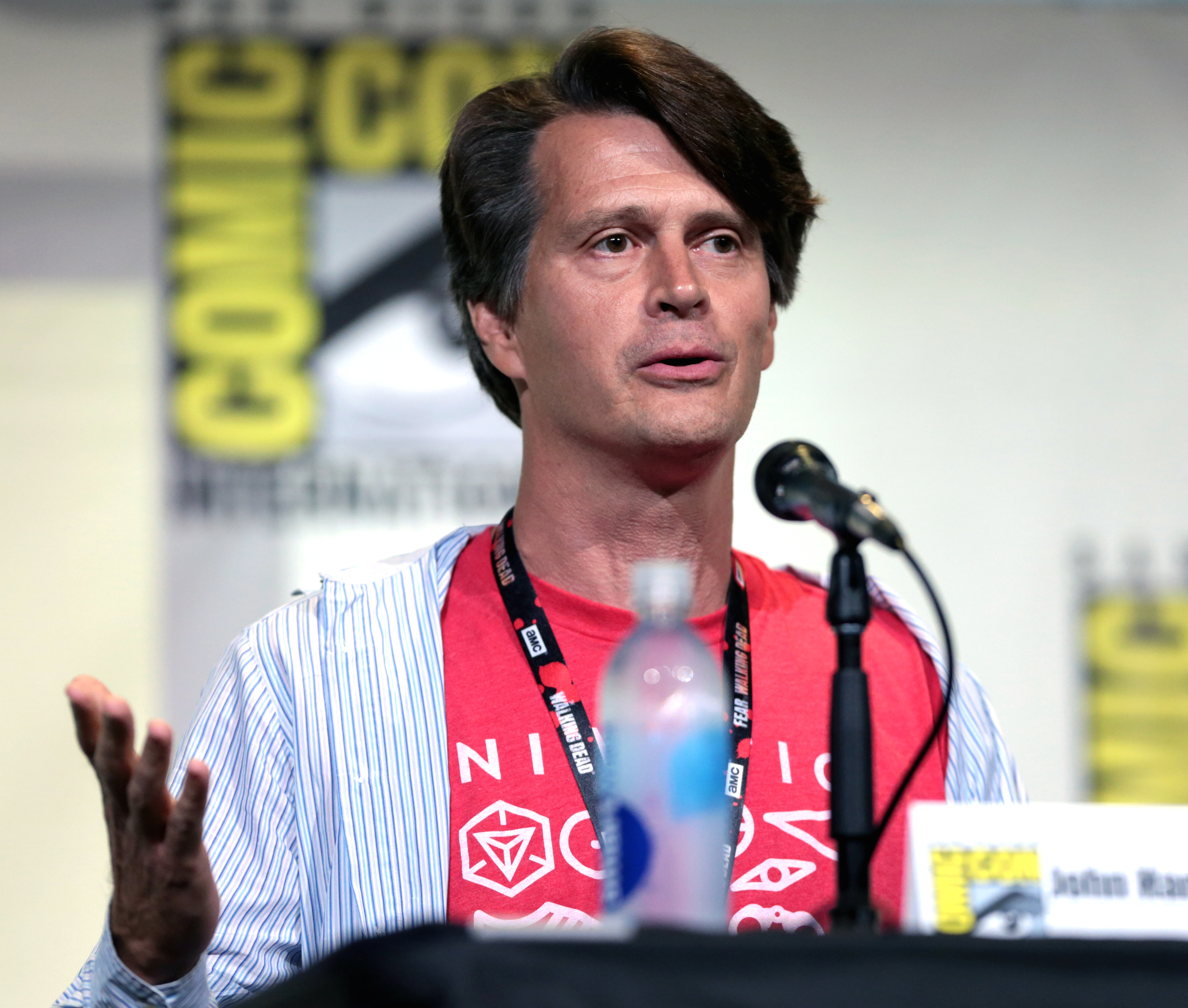
John Hanke, founder and CEO of Niantic

John Hanke worked at Keyhole in 2001, a software development company specializing in geospatial data visualization applications. Hanke was hired by Google in 2004 as part of Google's acquisition of Keyhole. Hanke led Google's Geo division, which was Google Maps, Google Earth, and Google Street View. The move to the Geo division included Keyhole employees such as Brian McClendon and Bill Kilday.

Hanke left the Geo division in October 2010 to form Niantic Labs, an internal startup within Google. The company's namesake is the whaling vessel Niantic, which came to San Francisco during the California gold rush in the 1840s. At the time Ingress was launched, Niantic had 35 employees.

=== Private company ===
The company spun out of Google in October 2015, soon after Google's announcement of its restructuring as Alphabet Inc. Niantic also announced that Google, Nintendo, and The Pokémon Company would invest up to $30 million in Series-A funding, $20 million upfront and the remaining $10 million in financing conditioned upon the company achieving certain milestones to support the growth of the company and its products. In February 2016, Niantic announced that it had secured an additional $5 million in Series A funding including investment from venture capital firms Alsop Louie Partners and You & Mr. Jones Brandtech Ventures, as well as angel investors Lucas Nealan, Cyan Banister, and Scott Banister. While adding more support for the growth of the company, this investment enabled Niantic to bring in strategic industry pioneers including the addition of Gilman Louie to its board.

=== Acquisitions and investments ===
In November 2017, Niantic raised $200 million in Series B funding from multiple investors, led by Spark Capital. Spark's Megan Quinn joined Niantic's board of directors during this investment round. Niantic acquired Evertoon, an app that lets users make short, personalized films. According to the company's announcement, the acquisition is meant to help build social systems. At the time of the acquisition, Evertoon was 18 months old and had five employees.

In February 2018, Niantic announced that it had acquired augmented reality company Escher Reality, a team focused on building persistent, cross-platform, multi-user experiences. Hanke stated that Niantic planned to allow third-party developers to build AR games similar to Pokémon Go.

In June 2018, Niantic announced the acquisition of computer vision and machine learning company Matrix Mill. The Matrix Mill team has spent years developing deep neural networks to infer 3D information about the surrounding world, enabling augmented reality occlusion. The acquisition advances Niantic's efforts to deliver planet-scale AR and provide realistic AR experiences.

In July 2018, Niantic announced the acquisition of LA-based gaming studio, Seismic Games. The gaming studio consists of industry veterans from EA/Pandemic and Activision.

In November 2018, Niantic invested in DigiLens alongside Mitsubishi Chemical's Diamond Edge Ventures. The investment was to help DigiLens develop holographic waveguide displays for augmented reality applications.

In January 2019, it was reported that Niantic had raised an additional $245 million in a Series C funding round. The round was led by Institutional Venture Partners (IVP) but also included investments from strategic partners such as AXiomatic Gaming and Samsung Ventures. The investment valued the company at $3.7 billion, excluding the investment itself.

In June 2019, Niantic announced the acquisition of London-based development studio Sensible Object. Niantic CEO Hanke stated that the acquisition "significantly advances [Niantic's] efforts in developing a wide range of gaming experiences that bring the physical and digital world closer together". In March 2020, Niantic acquired 3D world-scanning software company 6D.ai. In January 2021, Niantic acquired Mayhem, a community gaming platform.

In 2021, Niantic acquired Scaniverse, a 3D scanning app, and Lowkey, a social gaming platform in which users can record and share gameplay moments. In 2022, Niantic announced the acquisition of 8th Wall, a WebAR development platform, and NZXR, an augmented reality studio.

In 2023, Niantic closed its Los Angeles studio and laid off 230 employees.

=== Lightship ===
In June 2018, Niantic shared a sneak peek behind the technology they had been developing for years: the Niantic Real World Platform. The core platform consists of a suite of tools including: AR Cloud, anti-cheat security, POI data, IAP, social, analytics, CRM, sponsorship, and more. Niantic mentioned that they intend to open up the platform in the future for use by third-party developers.

In early 2021, Niantic rebranded the Niantic Real World Platform as Lightship. In November 2021, Niantic launched the Lightship software development kit (SDK) for augmented reality based on Unity. The company raised $300 million from Coatue Management for further development of Lightship and Niantic's "real-world metaverse", valuing the company at $9 billion.

=== Scopely acquisition ===
On February 18, 2025, Bloomberg reported that Niantic was in talks to sell its video game business to Scopely, a wholly owned subsidiary of Saudi Arabian Savvy Games Group, for $3.5 billion. On March 12, the acquisition was confirmed. In April 2025, 68 employees were laid off as part of the company's restructuring. The acquisition was completed on May 29, 2025, with a press release stating the acquired game development teams as the Niantic games team. Niantic's geospatial business was spun off into a separate company, Niantic Spatial Inc. A year after the acquisition, the Scopely team dropped the Niantic name, rebranding to Scopely Explore.

== Products ==
Products released timeline
2010
2011
2012	Field Trip
2013	Ingress
2014
2015
2016	Pokémon Go
2017
2018	Ingress Prime
2019	Harry Potter: Wizards Unite
2020
2021	Pikmin Bloom
2022
2023	NBA All-World
2023	Peridot
2023	Monster Hunter Now

=== Ingress ===
Ingress, Niantic's first augmented reality game, was launched in November 2012 on Android as an invitation-only application. It was later released publicly in October 2013. An iOS version was released in July 2014.

Early versions of Ingress eschewed practices traditionally seen in mobile app development, such as advertisements and in-app purchases. However, Niantic later added in-app purchases to the game after their split from Google in 2015. At the time, Niantic founder John Hanke called Ingress a "proof of concept" and mentioned that further updates could enable packaging of application programming interfaces (APIs) from the Ingress application to entice developers. Companies that partnered with Niantic were marketed via the narrative of Ingress, rather than through direct marketing techniques.

In November 2018, Niantic released a revamped version of the game branded as Ingress Prime. The game's source code was completely rewritten within the Unity game engine. Niantic continued to market the older Ingress game as a separate downloadable application named Scanner [REDACTED]. The intention in retaining the older Ingress game was to help players transition to Prime; feature parity between the two games was reached in 2019.

In collaboration with Japanese animation studio Craftar Studios, Ingress: The Animation, a television series based on the game, was aired in Japan on Fuji TV's +Ultra programming block in October 2018. The series premiered globally on Netflix on April 30, 2019.

=== Pokémon Go ===
In September 2015, it was announced that Niantic had been developing Pokémon Go in partnership with Nintendo and The Pokémon Company for iOS and Android devices. Tatsuo Nomura, who joined Niantic in 2015 after developing the Google Maps: Pokémon Challenge, acted as director and product manager for the game.

Pokémon Go was released in Australia, New Zealand, and the United States in July 2016, and received a staggered rollout in other countries throughout the remainder of 2016. The game became an overnight global phenomenon, significantly increasing the use and visibility of augmented reality technology. In addition to topping app store charts in most regions, Apple Inc. announced that Pokémon Go had become the most downloaded app in its first week ever, only to be surpassed by Super Mario Run later that year. Multiple reports indicated that users spent more time on Pokémon Go than on popular social media applications such as Facebook, Twitter, Snapchat, Tinder, and Instagram. In one month, Pokémon Go was downloaded more than 100 million times, and the game's daily revenues soon exceeded $10 million.

Two months after the game's launch, John Hanke announced at Apple's September keynote that Pokémon Go had exceeded 500 million downloads worldwide, and that players around the world had collectively walked over 4.6 billion kilometers. By December, it was announced that this distance had nearly doubled to over 8.7 billion kilometers, meaning that players had collectively walked further than the distance from Earth to Pluto. By the end of February 2017, Pokémon Go had surpassed over 650 million downloads. During Pokémon Go's Adventure Week in-game promo in May 2017, Niantic announced that the game's players had collectively walked over 15.8 billion kilometers, roughly the distance from Earth to the edge of the Solar System. On June 8, 2017, it was revealed that Pokémon Go had been downloaded over 750 million times globally. In 2019, Pokémon Go crossed the 1 billion threshold for total downloads.

The game's two primary revenue streams are in-app purchases and regional partnerships. Pokémon Go has established several partnerships with major companies across the globe, including Verizon and Starbucks in the United States, Reliance Jio in India, SoftBank and 7-Eleven in Japan, and McDonald's in Canada.

=== Pikmin Bloom ===
On October 26, 2021, Nintendo and Niantic announced the launch of a new smartphone app for the Pikmin franchise called Pikmin Bloom. The project is an augmented reality-based adventure set in the real world that incorporates small creatures named Pikmin. The app was the first developed by Niantic's Tokyo division, established in 2018. Pikmin Bloom was released worldwide on November 2, 2021, following a series of soft launches over the course of the previous week.

=== Peridot ===
On April 14, 2022, Niantic announced the launch of Peridot, a direct project from Niantic. Peridot's open beta began in Norway on July 28, 2022, and the app was released worldwide on May 9, 2023. In April 2026, Niantic's successor company, Niantic Spatial, announced that the apps would be removed from all iOS and Android devices on May 14, 2026, and that the game's servers would officially close on August 31, 2026.

=== Monster Hunter Now ===
On April 17, 2023, Niantic announced the development of a game with Capcom based on the Monster Hunter franchise, titled Monster Hunter Now. The game was released in September 2023.

=== Former projects ===
In 2012, Niantic launched its first product, Field Trip, a location-based mobile app that acted as a "guide to the cool, hidden, and unique things in the world around you." In July 2019, Niantic announced it would shut down the app later that year, and the app was subsequently removed from the iOS and Android app stores.

==== Harry Potter: Wizards Unite ====
In November 2017, it was announced that Niantic had been developing Harry Potter: Wizards Unite in partnership with Warner Bros. Interactive Entertainment and WB Games San Francisco, under the aegis of Portkey Games. The mobile augmented reality game, inspired by J.K. Rowling's Wizarding World and Harry Potter, was marketed as allowing players to "explore real-world neighborhoods and cities to discover mysterious artifacts, learn to cast spells, and encounter legendary beasts and iconic characters along the way". The game was first released in New Zealand as an open beta on April 16, 2019, and beta testing subsequently began in Australia on May 1, 2019. The game received a worldwide launch on June 22, 2019. Niantic announced in November 2021 that the game would shut down on January 31, 2022.

==== Other projects ====
On June 28, 2022, Niantic announced NBA All-World, a game developed in partnership with the National Basketball Association (NBA) and National Basketball Players Association (NBPA). The game was released worldwide on January 24, 2023. On June 29, 2023, Niantic announced that the game would be sunsetted due to the company's layoff of 230 employees from their Los Angeles office.

==== Unreleased projects ====
In 2014, Niantic announced its second mobile game, Endgame: Proving Ground. The game was intended to be part of a transmedia storytelling project that also included an alternate reality game, Endgame: Ancient Truth, and multiple novels by James Frey starting with Endgame: The Calling.

CATAN GmbH announced at the 2019 Essen Game Fair that it was working with Niantic on an upcoming "massively multiplayer location-based game" titled Catan: World Explorers. The game was to be based on the Catan board games; players would move through the real world, using their smartphones to build a Catan universe. The game was initially soft-launched as an open beta in New Zealand, Australia, Denmark, Switzerland, and Singapore. However, the game ceased development in November 2021 before receiving an official launch.

In June 2021, Niantic announced Transformers: Heavy Metal, a partnership with Hasbro and Tomy. The game was co-developed with Seattle-based studio Very Very Spaceship, but Niantic cancelled the game and three others in June 2022 amidst internal staff layoffs.

In September 2022, Niantic announced Marvel World of Heroes, a joint project with Marvel Entertainment based on the Marvel Universe. The game was scheduled to launch in 2023. However, on June 29, 2023, Niantic announced that the game was cancelled due to the layoffs of 230 employees from the company's Los Angeles office.

== Controversies ==
=== Lawsuits ===
Niantic has been sued in at least two class-action lawsuits: one starting in 2016 due to complaints from homeowners regarding trespassing and nuisance caused by Pokémon Go players, and a $1.58 million settlement following gameplay issues during a real-life event in Chicago.

In 2023, two former female employees whom Niantic laid off sued the company for denying equal pay to female employees and to women of color. One employee accused the company of being paid $10,000 less than her job's posted pay range, and between 2021 and 2023, she had learned that a less experienced male colleague had a higher salary than her.

Wolfpack, a human resources for women, found in a survey that many female employees viewed Niantic as "sexist" and referred to them as a "boys' club".

=== Spoofing ===
On June 15, 2019, Niantic sued Global++, an unauthorized third-party software created by an "association of hackers" which allowed players to spoof their GPS location to cheat in Niantic's augmented reality games, including Ingress and Pokémon Go. Niantic claimed that the hacked versions of the applications were infringing on their intellectual property rights. The developer of Global++ earned money by selling subscriptions and soliciting donations through the hacked apps. This resulted in Niantic forcing the developers to terminate their illegitimate distributions of the hacked apps and reverse engineering the games' codes. Global++ had to shut down their services, PokeGo++ and Ingress++, and their social media services. Niantic has also claimed that Global++ was also in the process of creating Potter++—shortly before the release of the actual content—which Niantic stated would harm the success of the game. The lawsuit was settled for $5 million following a decision on January 12, 2021, and Niantic was granted a permanent injunction.

=== COVID-19 pandemic ===
In August 2021, Niantic faced criticism from the Pokémon Go playerbase due to reverting safety measures implemented during the COVID-19 pandemic, in which gym and PokéStop interaction distances were increased from 40 to 80 meters (130 to 260 ft). New Zealand and the United States were the first countries to have the pandemic bonuses revert on August 1. The Delta variant of COVID-19 in the U.S. became dominant in July 2021, along with outbreaks. Players began boycotting Pokémon Go in the first week of August 2021. Niantic responded to the community on August 26 by permanently changing the interaction distance to 80 meters.

In April 2023, Niantic changed the game's remote raiding feature, which was introduced during the pandemic. The in-game prices for remote raid passes were increased, and the number of remote raids a player could do was limited to five a day.
