= Scoutmob =

Former American ecommerce company

- Founded: 2010; 16 years ago
- Founders: David Payne; Michael Tavani
- Headquarters: Atlanta, Georgia, United States
- Brands: Shoppe
- Revenue: US$5 million (2013)

Scoutmob was an Atlanta-based startup company whose primary service was an ecommerce website focused on offering unique goods from independent makers.

== History ==
=== Local deals ===
Scoutmob was founded in 2010 by David Payne and Michael Tavani as an offshoot of another Atlanta-based company that provided customized wifi accounts to local businesses. The company started providing the local deals portion of their business in Atlanta and quickly expanded to other cities in the United States. In April 2011, it was announced that the company raised $1.5 million in financing. The funding was led by New Atlantic Ventures and it and the company planned to use it to expand to more cities and hire more individuals. Prior to this investment from New Atlantic Ventures, the company had received funding for various angel investors in the Atlanta area. The site has been described as a mix between other coupon websites like Groupon and Living Social, but also combining location-based dynamics like FourSquare.

=== Emergence of Shoppe ===
In 2012, the company launched Shoppe by Scoutmob, "an ecommerce marketplace showcasing locally-made goods and the creators behind them." The site offers curated content from independent makers, whose products range from clothing and accessories to home goods and food. In 2013, the company reported revenues of US$5 million with most of that being generated by their Shoppe business. Prompted by Shoppe's growth, Scoutmob shifted its primary focus towards the ecommerce site in 2014. During the transition, the company was forced to "trim its workforce, as the company pivots from commoditized daily deals to artsy e-commerce". After the success of Shoppe, Scoutmob's local deals portion scaled back, but continues to provide coupons and curated experiences to users in the Atlanta area under the name Scoutmob Atlanta.

== Business model ==
Scoutmob differentiates itself from sites like Living Social, a deal-of-the-day website that features discounted gift certificates usable at local or national companies and Groupon, a deal-of-the-day website that features discounted gift certificates usable at local or national companies, by providing users deals on their mobile phone and by being instantly redeemable. Deals are presented daily and have a "limited time discount". After choosing the deal, users have the option to have a notification be sent to their email or to have it be directly sent to their mobile phone. Smartphone owners can also redeem the deals on the Scoutmob app. The user can redeem it at their convenience. Although deals move quickly, once claimed, users can take their time to use it.

== Maker movement ==
Scoutmob’s emphasis on “celebrating the independent makers by seeking out their inspired goods and crafted experiences" places the company at the forefront of the maker movement in the 2010s and Maker culture.

== Notable partnerships ==
In 2015, Scoutmob launched a new marketplace on Handmade by Amazon, "a new store on Amazon.com for invited artisans to sell their unique, handcrafted goods to our hundreds of millions of customers worldwide" Many of the goods sold on Scoutmob's own website are now also available on their Amazon site as well. As of 5 August 2015, the marketplace hosts 357 products.
