= Ingress (video game) =

Location-based augmented reality mobile game

- Developers: Niantic (2012—2025); Niantic Spatial (2025—present)
- Publishers: Niantic (2012—2025); Niantic Spatial (2025—present)
- Platforms: Android, iOS
- Release: December 14, 2013: Ingress; Android; December 14, 2013; iOS; July 14, 2014; Ingress Prime; WW: November 5, 2018

Ingress (Note: The game was called Ingress Prime from November 2018 to November 2025.) is an augmented reality (AR) mobile game currently developed and published by Niantic Spatial for Android and iOS devices. The game was released as a closed beta on November 15, 2012, for Android devices and then for iOS devices on July 14, 2014. The game is free-to-play, uses a freemium business model, and supports in-app purchases for additional in-game items. The mobile app has been downloaded more than 20 million times worldwide as of November 2018.

Ingress uses the mobile device GPS to locate and interact with "portals" near the player's real-world location. The portals are physical points of interest where "human creativity and ingenuity is expressed," often manifesting as public art such as statues and monuments, unique architecture, outdoor murals, historic buildings, local community hubs, and other displays of human achievement. The game uses the portals as elements of a science fiction backstory along with a continuous open narrative provided through various forms of media.

== Synopsis ==
An unknown, transdimensional force called Exotic Matter (XM) was discovered by a team of scientists at the European Organization for Nuclear Research (CERN) in Switzerland with the Large Hadron Collider when researching the Higgs boson. Within the game, human reactions to this discovery fall into two factions known as the Enlightened (green) and the Resistance (blue). The Enlightened faction harnesses the powers of XM to transcend humanity and believes its mission is to aid mankind's enlightenment by using this energy. The Resistance faction sees XM as a potential threat to humanity and believes their mission is to defend the human race by resisting the effects of those seeking to control others with XM. There is also machina (red), which does not align with either faction.

== Gameplay ==
The gameplay of Ingress has been described as combining elements of geocaching with capture the flag.

=== Play environment ===
The game's intel map showing game elements with a dark Google Maps baselayer

A player using their mobile device (scanner) is presented with a map representing the surrounding area. The map has a black background and is completely unmarked, except for buildings and roads outlined in grey but not labeled, and bodies of water. These geographical features are supplied by OpenStreetMap. Portals, Exotic Matter, links, and control fields are visible on the map. Distances from the player to in-game locations are displayed in metric units.

Players must be physically near objects on the map to interact with them. The scanner represents the player with an action range of 40 meters (130 ft). A player can hack nearby portals to acquire items. Players are rewarded with Action Points (AP) for actions within the game. Accumulating AP beyond certain thresholds grants higher access levels. The access levels are numbered 1 through 16, with 16 being the highest. Once a player reaches Access Level 16, they unlock the ability to recurse, which allows them to start anew with the option to switch factions.

In addition to earning AP, certain actions within the game can earn a player a medal. Medals are usually multi-tiered and become a requirement for level advancement beyond level 8. Most medals are statistic-based: for instance, capturing portals, total MUs captured, fields and links created, various offensive actions, and successfully discovering new portals. Some medals are time-limited, requiring particular achievements in a set time frame. Some are exclusive and can only be obtained by attending special events.

In September 2014, Niantic introduced missions to the game. A mission is a user-created set of places to visit (waypoints) and interact in specified ways. Some missions list all the waypoints from the start, while others only reveal them once as the user progresses from one to the next. Completing missions rewards the player with a mission medal displayed on their agent profile.

=== Portals ===
Portals span across the globe and are made visible by the scanner. They are surrounded by a cluster of XM and color corresponding to the faction/entity controlling the portal: green (the Enlightened), blue (the Resistance), red (machina), or white (unclaimed). Players claim portals for their faction by deploying at least one resonator on them. They can also add mods (modifications) to protect the portals or increase their power in various ways. If a portal is claimed by the enemy or the Machina, the player must first either neutralize it by destroying the portal's resonators with weapons called XMP (Exotic Matter Pulse) Bursters and Ultra Strikes or flip the portal using either a Jarvis Virus or an ADA Refactor. Players acquire game items (resonators, XMP bursters, etc.) by maneuvering to within 40 metres (130 ft) of a portal, typically by walking, biking, or driving, and hacking it by selecting this option on their scanners. Players can also earn additional items and AP for glyph hacking a portal, where they are briefly shown several patterns called glyphs and must retrace them in the order they appeared within a time limit. If the portal is a Machina portal, players can, instead of hacking the portal, neutralize it, causing it to drop its resonators and mods onto the ground, which can then be picked up.

Portals are typically associated with buildings and landmarks of historic or architectural significance — such as sculptures, murals, and other public art, libraries, post offices, memorials, places of worship, transport hubs, parks, and other recreational or tourism spaces, or with business locations. Players may submit requests for the creation of new portals if they meet the level requirements. It was thought upon at the game's launch that this would allow Google to generate data for its location-based services. As of July 2016, 15 million portals had been submitted by the Ingress community, and five million of those had been included in the game. At the time of Ingress Prime's release in November 2018, Niantic stated that "agents in more than 200+ countries have participated in more than 2,000 real-world events and visited more than 1.2 billion Portals".

=== Links and control fields ===
Two portals with eight resonators deployed and controlled by the same faction can be linked by a player from that faction who is within range of one and has a portal key for the other. The maximum possible length of a link depends on the average level of the portal and any mods that amplify the portal's link range. Portals can retain the links and/or fields associated with them when they contain at least three resonators. Once the portal has fewer than three resonators, all links and fields on the portal are destroyed.

Links between portals can range from several meters to thousands of kilometers and are created in operations of considerable logistical complexity. In more complex operations, links and fields can span across countries and oceans.

When three portals are linked in a triangle, they create a control field, claiming Mind Units (MU) within that field for their faction. In the game's context, control fields align the population's thoughts with the faction. Control Fields are measured by the size of the human population that lives under the field. Therefore, larger Control Fields earn more Mind Units. The opposing faction can destroy a control field by destroying one or more of the links that form it.

== Development and release ==
Ingress was released in closed beta on November 15, 2012, with an accompanying online viral marketing campaign. The latter was noticed as early as November 8, and earlier publicity efforts had been noted at events such as San Diego Comic-Con on July 12, 2012. At the time of Ingress's release to Niantic's separation from Google in 2015, Niantic had 35 employees.

An interview in 2013 described Ingress as a proof of concept for other AR games built on Google Maps' data. It was designed to be aimed at a niche market of gamers. Data from Ingress was used to populate the locations for PokéStops and Gyms within Pokémon Go when it released in July 2016. Niantic viewed Ingress Prime as an opportunity to innovate its gameplay design. The company adjusted the onboarding experience for new players into Ingress Prime to be more thorough, based on the responses they received for Pokémon Go.

=== Ingress Prime ===
In December 2017, Niantic announced that a thoroughly revamped version of the game, branded as Ingress Prime, would be released in 2018 using a completely rewritten client. The new version featured a subtly different backstory akin to a superhero origin story and a more florid graphic design. The new version used Apple's ARKit and Google's ARCore, and the network layer transitioned from JSON to Protobuf in keeping with the engineering style of Pokémon Go. Prime launched on November 5, 2018, as an update to the existing Ingress game. Niantic also retained the older Ingress game and retroactively named the older app as Scanner [REDACTED]. The older Ingress app was intended to facilitate the transition to Prime, as feature parity between the two apps was reached in 2019. Niantic retired the older app on September 30, 2019.

In November 2025, Niantic announced that Ingress Prime would be renamed to Ingress to mark the game's third iteration. The company explained their previous iterations as: Niantic Labs@Google (Ingress 1.0), Niantic Inc (Ingress 2.0), and Niantic Spatial (Ingress 3.0).

== Business model ==
Ingress was initially supported by advertising. Companies would be able to pay for their locations to be used as portals in the game, thus making their stores a pilgrimage site for Ingress players, which may translate into real-world sales. In Germany, Vodafone offered an Ingress phone plan with a large amount of data to support the game, in addition to its physical store locations becoming portals. In France, Niantic partnered with Unibail-Rodamco, and several of its shopping centers were incorporated in the game. In the United States, the Jamba Juice and Zipcar chains have both had sponsored locations in Ingress. Niantic CEO John Hanke described the number of commercial sponsors in Ingress as being "limited", stating that the developers do not want to take away from the experience of discovering interesting places in their local area.

Another form of advertising includes sponsorship of in-game equipment. Players can virtually acquire various tools and weapons to use in the game. Sponsored versions of these include the "AXA Shield", the "Lawson Power Cube", the "Circle K Power Cube", the "Ito En Transmuter (+/-)", the "SoftBank Ultra Link" and the "MUFG Capsule", all categorized as Very Rare and performing significantly better than non-sponsored versions. In-game sponsorship with AXA and MUFG ended in December 2017. The in-game sponsorship with Lawson and Circle K ended in December 2019. The items remained in the game but with references to the company names omitted. Any existing MUFG Capsules in an agent's inventory were turned into Quantum Capsules. Then, Quantum Capsules were deprecated in January 2023 and any that were in an agent's inventory were replaced with Capsules and Kinetic Capsules.

Physical items related to Ingress were initially available through Google's Merchandise Store as early as February 2013, before Niantic's split from Google in 2015. In October 2015, Niantic added an in-game store for microtransactions of in-game items using CMU (Chaotic Matter Units) and also opened a merchandise shop for physical items. Niantic's Ingress shop sold physical merchandise such as T-shirts and patches. The shop has expanded to a more Niantic-centric store.

In 2021, Niantic introduced a subscription option called C.O.R.E. (which stands for Community, Offers, Recognition, Expansion) for US$4.99 a month; it includes gameplay enhancements without hindering the base game. In July 2023, Niantic announced the monthly price for C.O.R.E. would increase to US$7.99 on August 28. The announcement explained, "C.O.R.E. has remained at the same price since 2021 and our LA studio's recent restructuring, global inflation, and other economic changes have all influenced our decision."

== Special events ==
In addition to the ongoing competition between the factions, several special events are held on specific dates.

=== Anomalies ===
XM Anomalies are events where players from both factions compete in portal-based games in order to win points for their faction. The format of an XM Anomaly event occurs over the extent of a weekend with Saturday consisting of the main event. A "series" for the XM Anomalies usually spans two different weekends. Anomaly locations may be chosen based on the player activity in a region. Players organize within their faction into squads based on player level, local knowledge, and mode of transport (for example, walking or biking). The largest event, in Japan, attracted over 10,000 players.

Anomaly sites are divided into two categories: Primary and Satellite locations. Niantic employees, as well as characters from the story, often attend events at Primary anomaly locations. More points are awarded to the prevailing faction at Primary sites than at Satellite sites. Players who participate in an anomaly are awarded a unique badge with the emblem of that anomaly.

== Reception ==
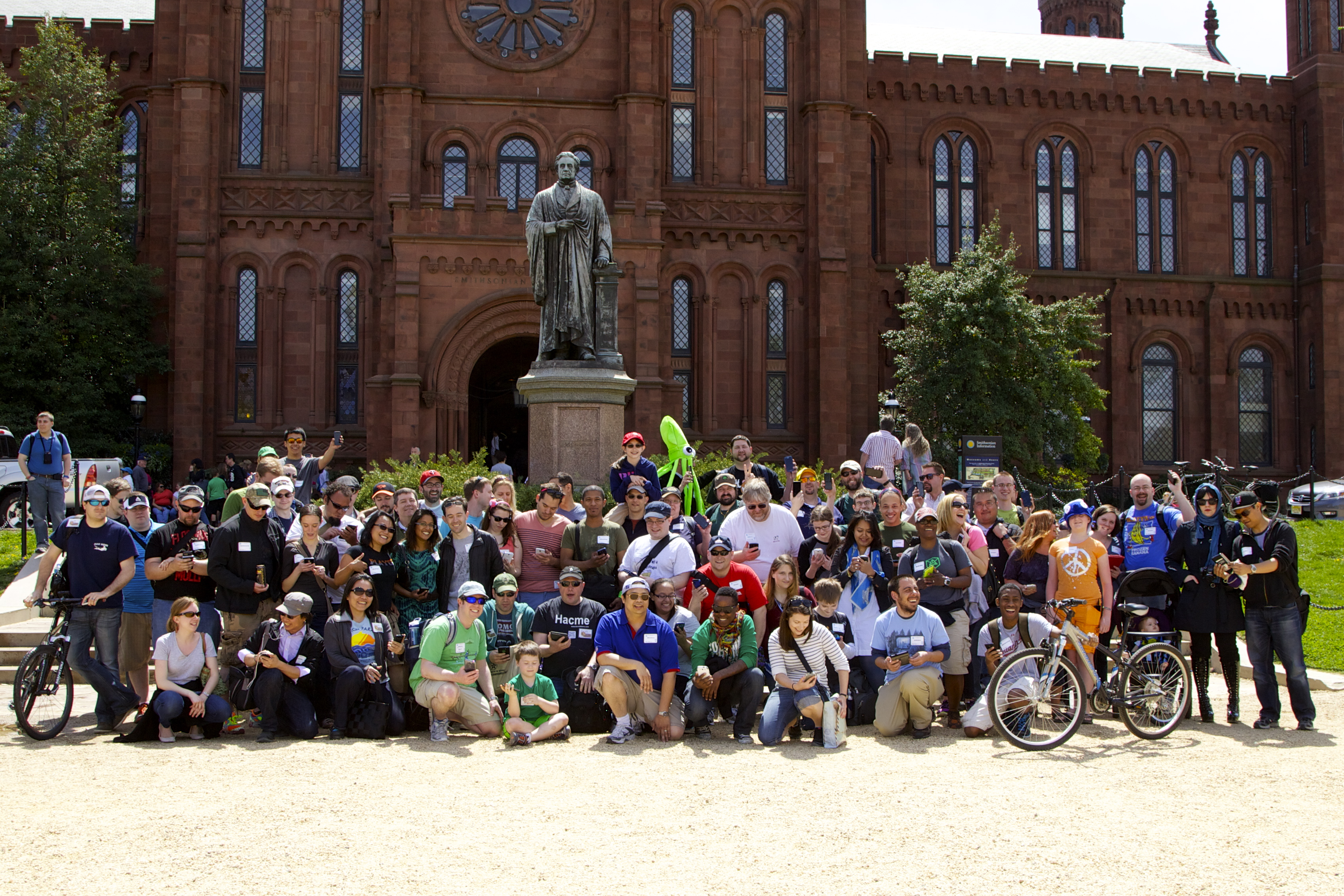
A cross-faction portal hunt convenes in Washington, D.C., by the Smithsonian Castle on April 14, 2013

=== Scholarship and reviews ===
Ingress has been the subject of academic study on the relationship between regionalism and globalism, and its badge system has been used as an example in a case study of gamification. Erin Stark argues that the game's system of players nominating portals based on street art is in effect the players curating a sense of place and a more flexible cultural heritage. Spanner Spencer, writing for PocketGamer, noted that there was no casual way of playing Ingress and that it demanded dedication and teamwork.

Ingress has been read as a gift economy in which players swap datafication of their physical location for gameplay.

Ingress is considered to be a location-based exergame. Niantic offers a set of guidelines for players that warn against trespassing in its Terms of Service and reinforce that players are responsible for their own conduct while playing the game. Legal expert Brian Wassom regards this as an important factor in AR games, reducing the legal risk they face when directing players to a location.

==== Awards ====
- Ingress won a "special mention" at the 2013 Android Players' Choice Awards.
- In 2014, Ingress won the 18th Japan Media Arts Festival Grand Prize for Entertainment Division.
- Ingress won the Game Designers Award at the 2015 Japan Game Awards.
- In 2019, Ingress received the Sport in Life award by Japan's Sport Agency.

=== Community and cultural impact ===
According to Alex Dalenberg of American City Business Journals, as of May 2013 there were about 500,000 players globally. In an interview in August 2013 with the fan site Decode Ingress, Niantic founder John Hanke said "There have been over 1M downloads and a large chunk of those are active." In February 2014 there were 2 million players. In January 2015, the game had been downloaded over 8 million times.

Speaking with CNN, CEO John Hanke said he didn't expect players to start talking to each other and forming clubs. The game has attracted an enthusiastic following in cities worldwide amongst both young and old, to the extent that the gameplay is itself a lifestyle for some, including tattoos. Players have even leased airplanes, helicopters, and boats to reach portals in remote areas of Siberia and Alaska.

==== Cross-faction cooperation ====
There are times when the game's backstory is ignored and agents from both factions cooperate for the sake of real-life gameplay and game balance: for example, by establishing neutral zones and rules of engagement; for training new players; for socializing; and occasionally for serious real-life purposes such as honoring fallen heroes.

The game has received local media coverage, including for players organizing events such as creating links between portals at war memorials for Memorial Day. The opposing faction members at MIT arranged a campus-wide truce after the death of Sean Collier, an MIT police officer shot by the perpetrators in the 2013 Boston Marathon bombing, and placed their two respective portals side-by-side in a virtual cenotaph at the site of his death.

=== Criticism and incidents ===
At the time of Ingress's launch in 2012, users noted and criticized Ingress for appearing very similar to Shadow Cities, an older, now-defunct, augmented reality game. Both have two factions that are fighting for the future of the world with smartphones. Though the games have similar game mechanics and look-and-feel, there are clear differences. In Shadow Cities, players are in the virtual world, which is dynamically mapped around them, and can teleport within the virtual world, whereas in Ingress, the portals are real-world locations that players generally have to actually move to in order to play. Shadow Cities was shut down on October 7, 2013.

Some players have attracted the attention of law enforcement while playing the game, and hence commentary on the interaction of augmented reality games with real life. Because it can take some time for players to successfully "hack" a portal, they can draw the attention of law enforcement. In addition, some players play while driving slowly around an area, which is not recommended by the game developers and attracts the attention of law enforcement. The Center for Internet Security recommended that law enforcement officers be apprised of the game, and warned that it may be difficult to determine if a malicious actor is using the game as a cover. Furthermore, players have used unofficial apps to stalk each other.

In 2014, a 16-year-old player in Brazil died after being hit by a bus while playing. In 2015, an Irish player fell into the sea and drowned while trying to capture Poolbeg Lighthouse at night.

In September 2019, Niantic informed their player base that XM anomaly events would be a paid event going forward. This was done as a surprise with the next anomaly approaching in four weeks. This change was reverted as a result of the COVID-19 pandemic.

Another criticism for the paid events is the events are organized by players with minor involvement from Niantic.

== Other media ==
Several published materials exist about the Ingress universe. A novella titled The Niantic Project: Ingress was released by Felicia Hajra-Lee on May 15, 2013. An audiobook of the novella was published through Audible with narration by the voice of ADA, Laura Bailey. A comic titled Ingress Origins was published in November 2015 by Cryptozoic Entertainment with a digital release in March 2017.

An anime based on the game premiered on Fuji TV's +Ultra anime programming block on October 18, 2018. The anime series premiered on Netflix worldwide on April 30, 2019.
