= John Hanke =

American technology executive (born 1967)

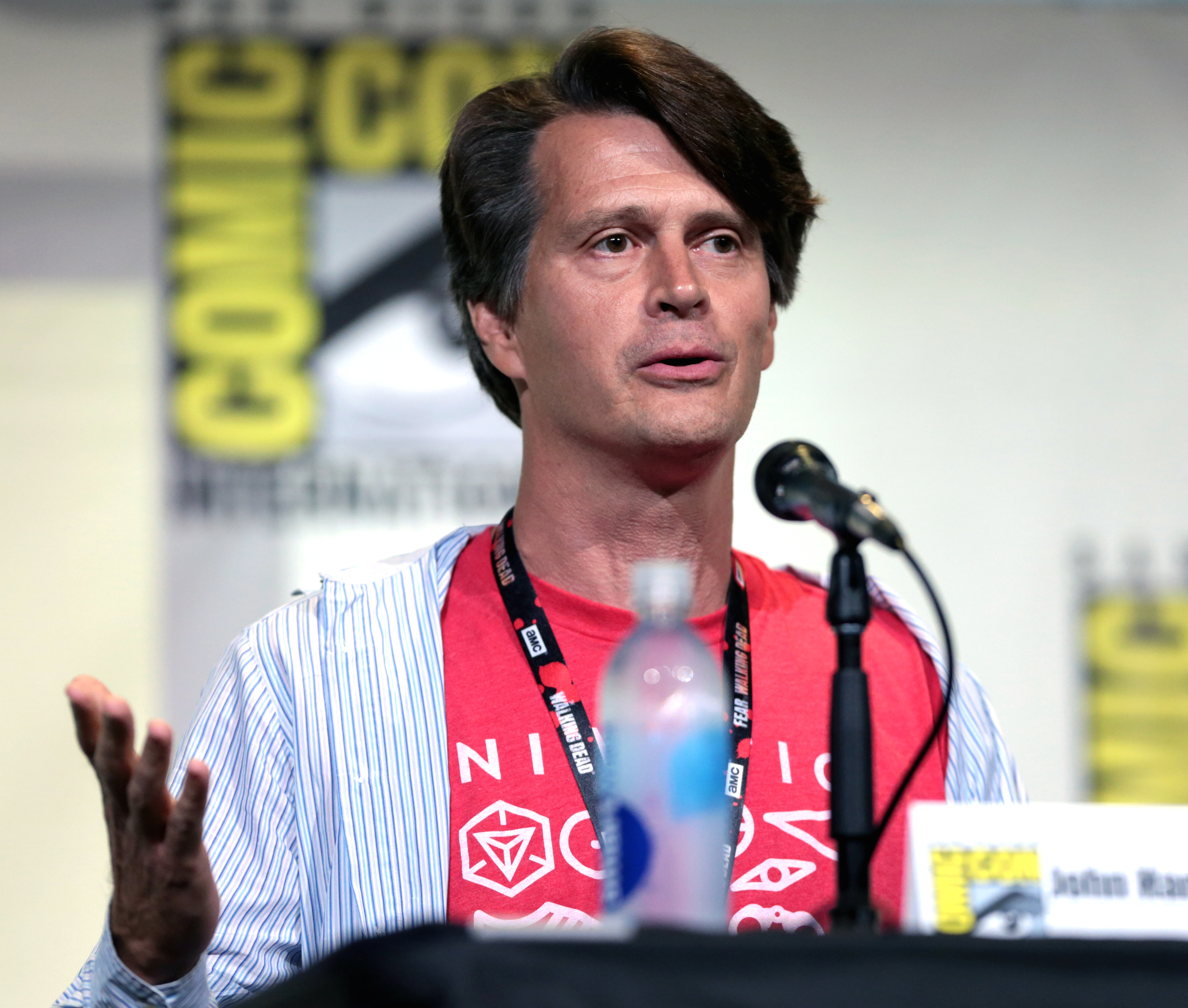
- Hanke at the 2016 San Diego Comic-Con
- Born: 1967 (age 58–59); Cross Plains, Texas
- Education: University of California, Berkeley; University of Texas at Austin
- Occupations: Businessman and entrepreneur
- Known for: Keyhole Corporation; Google Earth; Niantic, Inc.; Niantic Spatial

John Hanke (born 1967) is an American technology executive. Following Google's acquisition of his company Keyhole, Hanke led Google's Geo product division, which includes Google Earth, Google Maps, StreetView, SketchUp, and Panoramio. Within Google, he founded and led an internal startup, Niantic Labs, which he spun out in 2015. He is currently the founder and executive chairman at Niantic Spatial.

== Early life and startups ==
Born in 1967, Hanke was raised in the small central Texas town of Cross Plains and graduated from Cross Plains High School in 1985. He attended the University of Texas, Austin and graduated with a bachelor's degree in 1989.

In his first post-college role, he spent four years with the United States Foreign Service in Washington, DC, and overseas in Myanmar working on foreign policy issues.

He moved across the country to attend the Haas School of Business at the University of California, Berkeley. He joined Steve Sellers and his video game design startup Archetype Interactive, which was developing Meridian 59, one of the first commercial massively multiplayer online role-playing games (MMORPG). They sold the firm to The 3DO Company on the day he graduated from Berkeley with an MBA. Hanke and Sellers created another entertainment startup, The Big Network, which was acquired in 2000 by eUniverse for $17.1 million.

== Keyhole ==
Hanke became the co-founder and CEO of geospatial data visualization firm Keyhole in 2001. Early funding was provided by the corporate venture group within Sony, the CIA's venture capital firm In-Q-Tel, and the technology company NVIDIA. The startup was able to garner significant attention from its mapping technology use early in the Iraq War. Keyhole's mapping technology was also noted by Google co-founder Sergey Brin, and Google acquired Keyhole in 2004 in a deal worth $35 million in stock.

== Google ==
Hanke joined Google as a part of Keyhole's acquisition, and he became the vice president of product management for Google's Geo division. During this period, he oversaw the transformation of Keyhole's technology into Google Earth and Google Maps in 2005. He also negotiated an agreement with Apple to include Google Maps on the iPhone. Other products followed, including StreetView, SketchUp, and Panoramio. His team would later found Niantic.

== Niantic ==
In 2010, Hanke was given resources to staff an augmented reality gaming unit within Google and the new internal startup was dubbed Niantic Labs. Returning to his gaming roots, the company crafted an augmented reality location-based multiplayer game called Ingress. The game had a million players within a year of its 2013 release, and seven million by 2015.

Hanke led Niantic's split from Google in late 2015 and raised $30 million from Google, Nintendo and Pokémon. He stayed as the company's CEO and guided the firm through the release of Pokémon Go in July 2016, which has generated over $8.8 billion in revenue.

After Niantic's games business was purchased by Scopely in 2025 for $3.85 billion total value to investors, he took the company's core platform technology and remaining team to form Niantic Spatial, a startup focused on utilizing geospatial AI. He transitioned out of his role as CEO in March 2026, remaining as executive chairman.
