= SourceFed Studios =

American digital media company

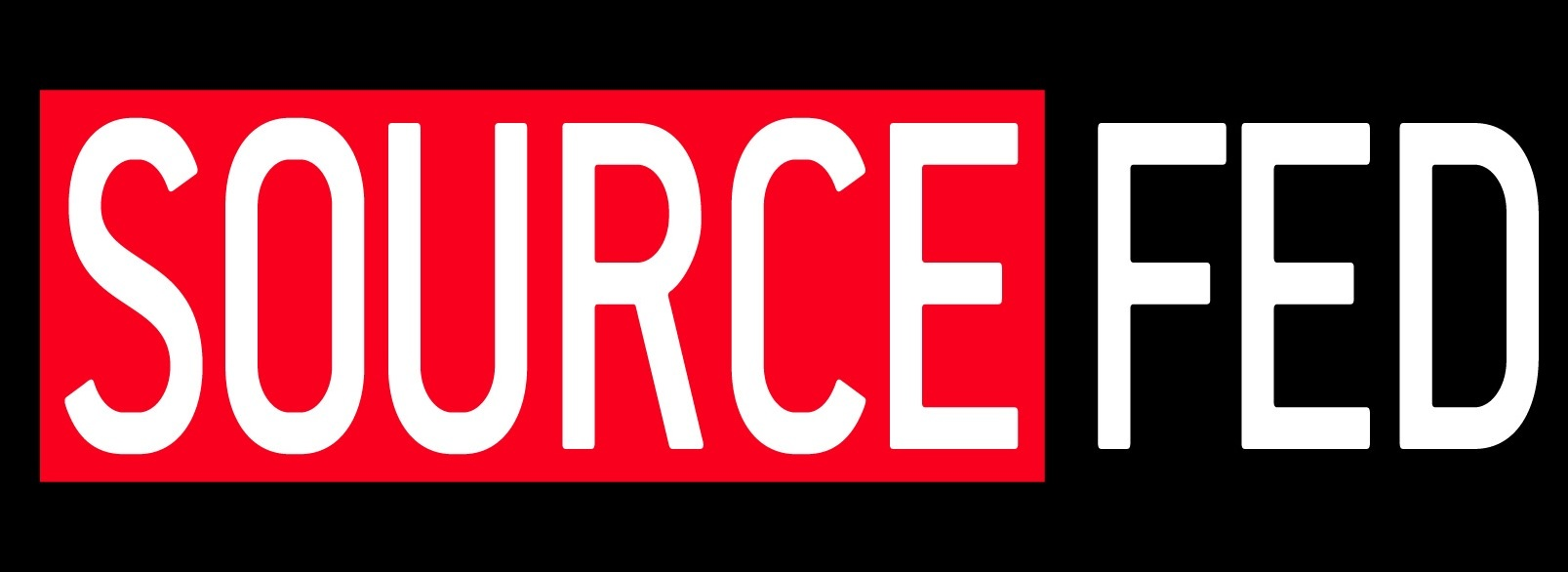
- Formerly: DeFranco Creative
- Industry: Digital media
- Founded: 2011; 15 years ago
- Defunct: March 2017; 9 years ago (Note: SourceFedNerd was replaced by NowThis Nerd on May 4, 2017. The content of the latter was removed on July 3, 2017, and the channel reverted to SourceFed Nerd.)
- Number of employees: 25 (2013)
- Parent: Revision3/Seeker (2013–2016); Group Nine Media (2016–2017)

YouTube information
- Channels: SourceFed; SourceFedNERD; Nuclear Family; Super Panic Frenzy; People Be Like
- Years active: 2013–present
- Genres: News and pop culture; Gaming; Commentary; Comedy; Sketch
- Subscribers: 3.3 million (combined)
- Views: 1.5 billion (combined)
- Last updated: August 21, 2022

SourceFed Studios was an American digital media company and multi-channel network created by Philip DeFranco in 2011. After finding success during the early years of YouTube with his eponymous news show, DeFranco secured funding from YouTube and launched SourceFed as part of the YouTube Original Channel Initiative in 2012.

SourceFed was one of the more successful YouTube-funded channels and a nerd culture-focused spinoff, SourceFedNerd, was launched in 2013. DeFranco then sold his DeFranco Creative portfolio, which included SourceFed to Revision3, a subsidiary of Discovery Digital Networks (DDN). Under that portfolio, SourceFed's production and hosting staff launched and worked on various sister channels including SourceFedNerd, People Be Like, Super Panic Frenzy, and ForHumanPeoples (later rebranded as Nuclear Family).

In 2016, DDN folded Revision3 into Seeker and renamed DeFranco Creative as SourceFed Studios. Seeker and SourceFed Studios were then acquired by Group Nine Media in late 2016. In March 2017, Group Nine shut down the remaining SourceFed Studios YouTube channels. SourceFedNerd was briefly rebranded as NowThis Nerd, but Group Nine reversed this after fan backlash. Although inactive, the SourceFed Studios channels remain online.

== History ==
=== Background and founding (2011–2012) ===
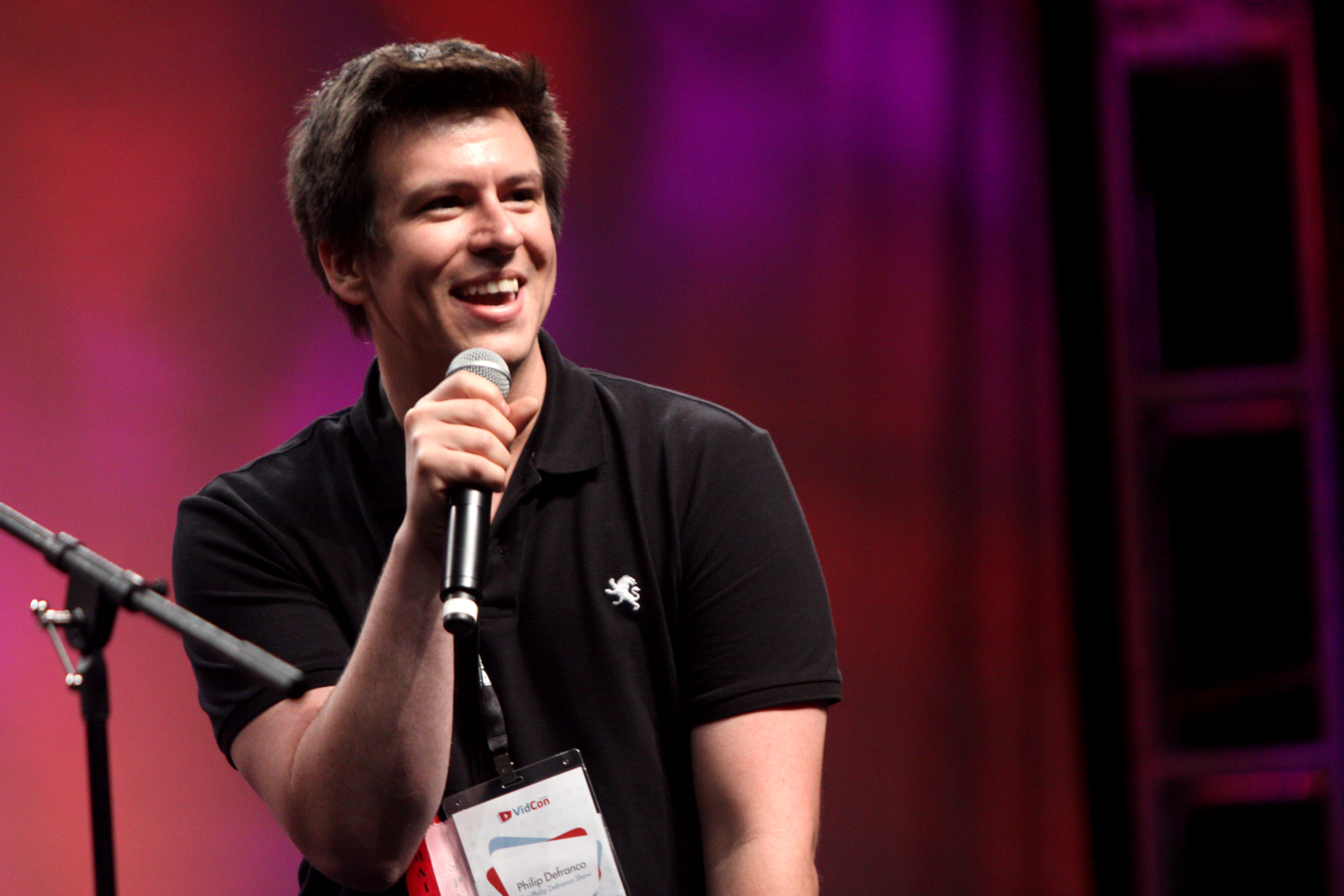
Philip DeFranco, the creator of SourceFed Studios

SourceFed was an idea Philip DeFranco had been considering as an evolution of his own YouTube series, The Philip DeFranco Show (PDS). In an interview with Forbes, DeFranco stated that he originally wanted to turn his daily show into several daily segments. He recalled there was confusion among his audience when this format was tested, convincing DeFranco that he would need to create a new series to not alienate, but grow his audience. Around this time, DeFranco also had plans to create a news network.

In late 2011, YouTube began its $100 million funding of original or premium content channels. Due to DeFranco's position as a YouTube partner, the website offered him funding for an original channel. The SourceFed channel, based on a blog of the same name, was one of these channels. DeFranco revealed that he acquired the funding to launch the channel by originally promising YouTube that the channel would be run as a "celebrity gossip channel", and that it would consist of a single show rather than multiple different shows. However, DeFranco negotiated for less funding, in return to have creative control over the channel's content. DeFranco also hand-picked the first six hosts of SourceFed. The channel launched on January 23, 2012.

The SourceFed channel found early success in attracting a sizable subscriber base. DeFranco later created a spinoff channel, SourceFedNerd (stylized as SourceFedNERD), which was announced on May 16, 2013. A teaser trailer was released, promising the debut of the channel on May 20. The New Movie Thing Show, The SourceFed Movie Club, and #TableTalk were moved from the original SourceFed channel to the Nerd channel. The spinoff channel hosted a live version of the #TableTalk series during the YouTube Comedy Week in 2013. The online stream was received well, being successful in terms of both raw viewership, as well as viewer retention.

=== Revision3 / Seeker ownership (2013–2016) ===
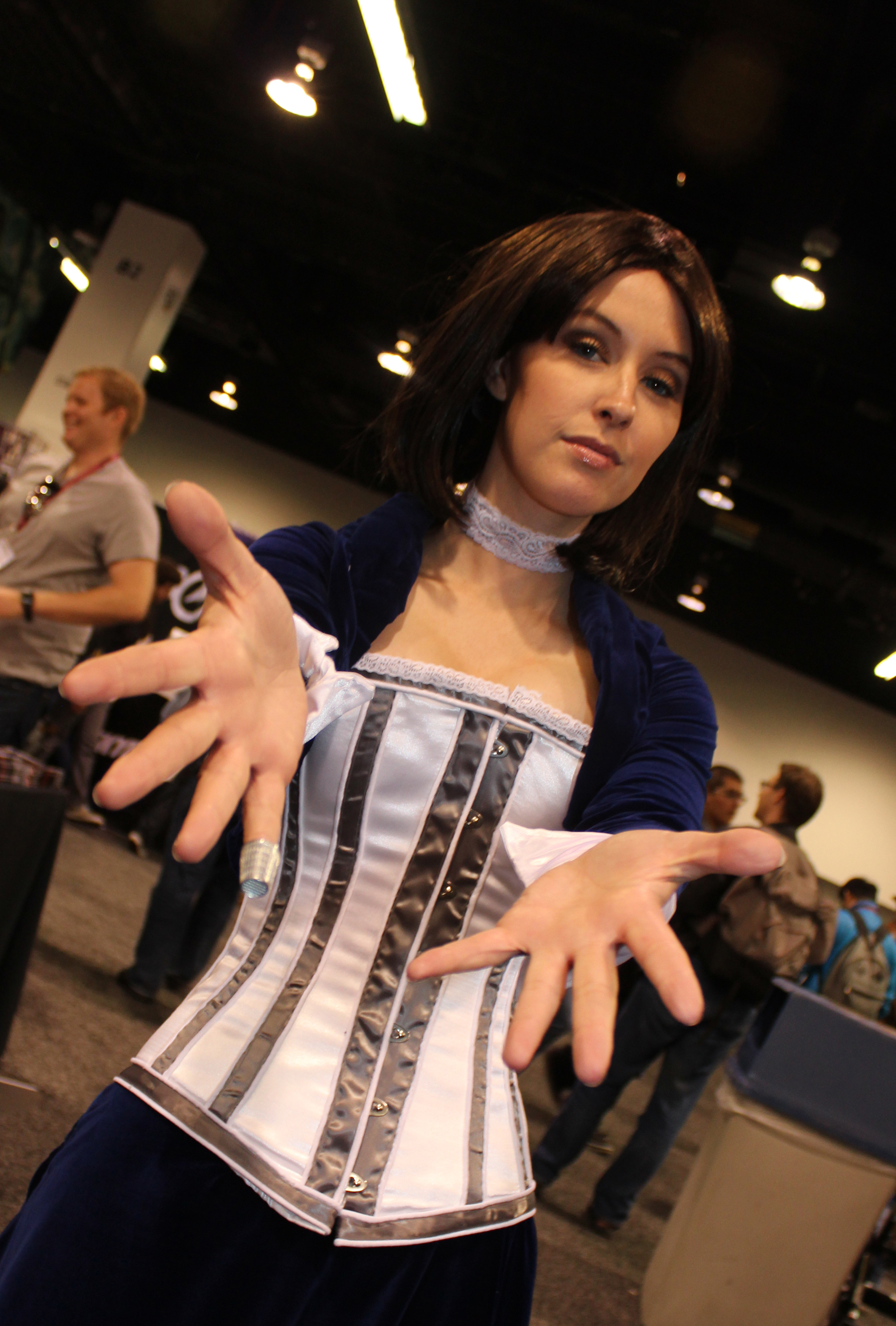
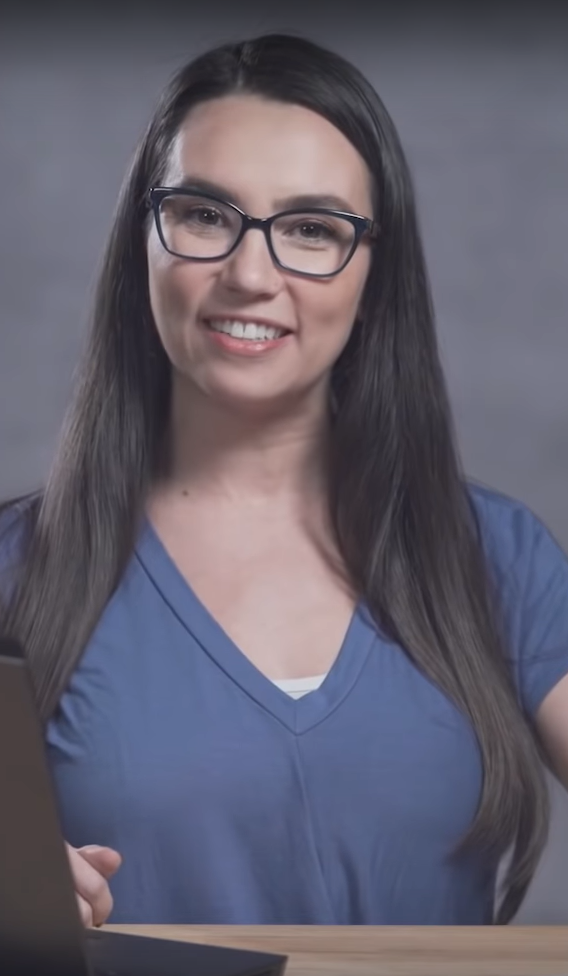
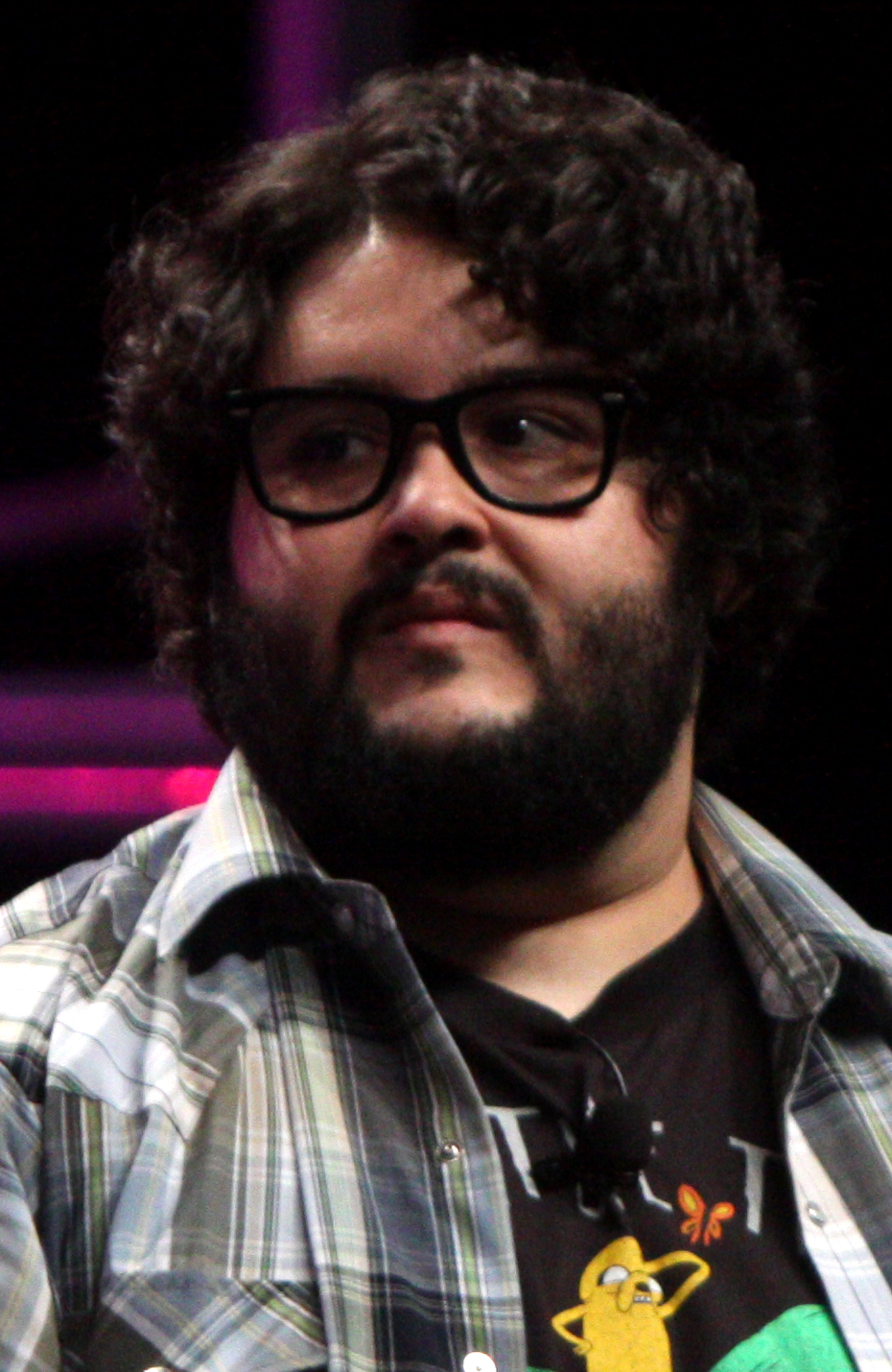
(L–R): Meg Turney, Trisha Hershberger, and Steve Zaragoza were often seen hosting on the SourceFedNerd channel.

In June 2013, Philip DeFranco sold SourceFed along with the other channels under his DeFranco Creative portfolio to Revision3. DeFranco also became an executive of Revision3 and the Senior Vice President of Phil DeFranco Networks and Merchandise, a newly formed subsidiary of the former, as a result of the move. DeFranco's "sxephil" channel, on which he hosted the PDS, was already signed under the Revision3 network. Revision3 itself was acquired by Discovery Communications in 2012, which was noted by The Verge to be Discovery's "first major play into the expanding web television [or digital media] market." By the beginning of 2014, Discovery began calling its digital branch by the name Discovery Digital Networks in their company blog.

While discussing the dissolution of SourceFed Studios, DeFranco retrospectively detailed that after selling his DeFranco Creative umbrella to Revision3, he began to have less involvement in SourceFed, before having no involvement at all. DeFranco expressed, "for you [long time viewers of SourceFed] who know what the original content was, and what it is now, you know that it's like, it's pretty much a completely different channel—both in content and the people running it." Previously, in June 2016, DeFranco made his earliest public clarification that he has "no hands on the creative decisions [made] on [SourceFed]."

On September 19, 2013, the SourceFedNerd channel reached 500,000 subscribers.

By 2016, Discovery eventually renamed Revision3 and DeFranco Creative as Seeker and SourceFed Studios, respectively. Additionally, Seeker's website's about page had SourceFed's properties listed under their ownership. SourceFed Studios encapsulated SourceFed and Nerd, as well as the PDS.

=== Group Nine Media merger and cancellation (2016–2017) ===
Discovery Digital Networks ceased to exist in late 2016, as Discovery Communications sold its assets into a new digital media holding company, Group Nine Media. Group Nine therefore merged Thrillist Media Group, NowThis Media, and The Dodo with Discovery's Seeker and SourceFed Studios. Although SourceFed doubled its video views year-over-year, Discovery's CCO Paul Guyardo stated that the merger occurred due to a need for "more scale, more brand and more resources." DeFranco clarified on Twitter that he had no involvement with the decision to dissolve SourceFed Studios.

On May 4, the SourceFed Nerd channel was rebranded as NowThis Nerd without prior knowledge and against the wishes of the former hosts. This rebranding received backlash from viewers and former hosts. The Nerd channel lost over 20,000 subscribers within the first five hours of the NowThis rebranding. On July 3, 2017, NowThis Nerd reverted the channel back to SourceFed Nerd and deleted the content made since the rebranding. The SourceFed Nerd channel was left up to serve as an archive of the original content and NowThis Nerd became its own separate channel.

== Channels and hosting ==
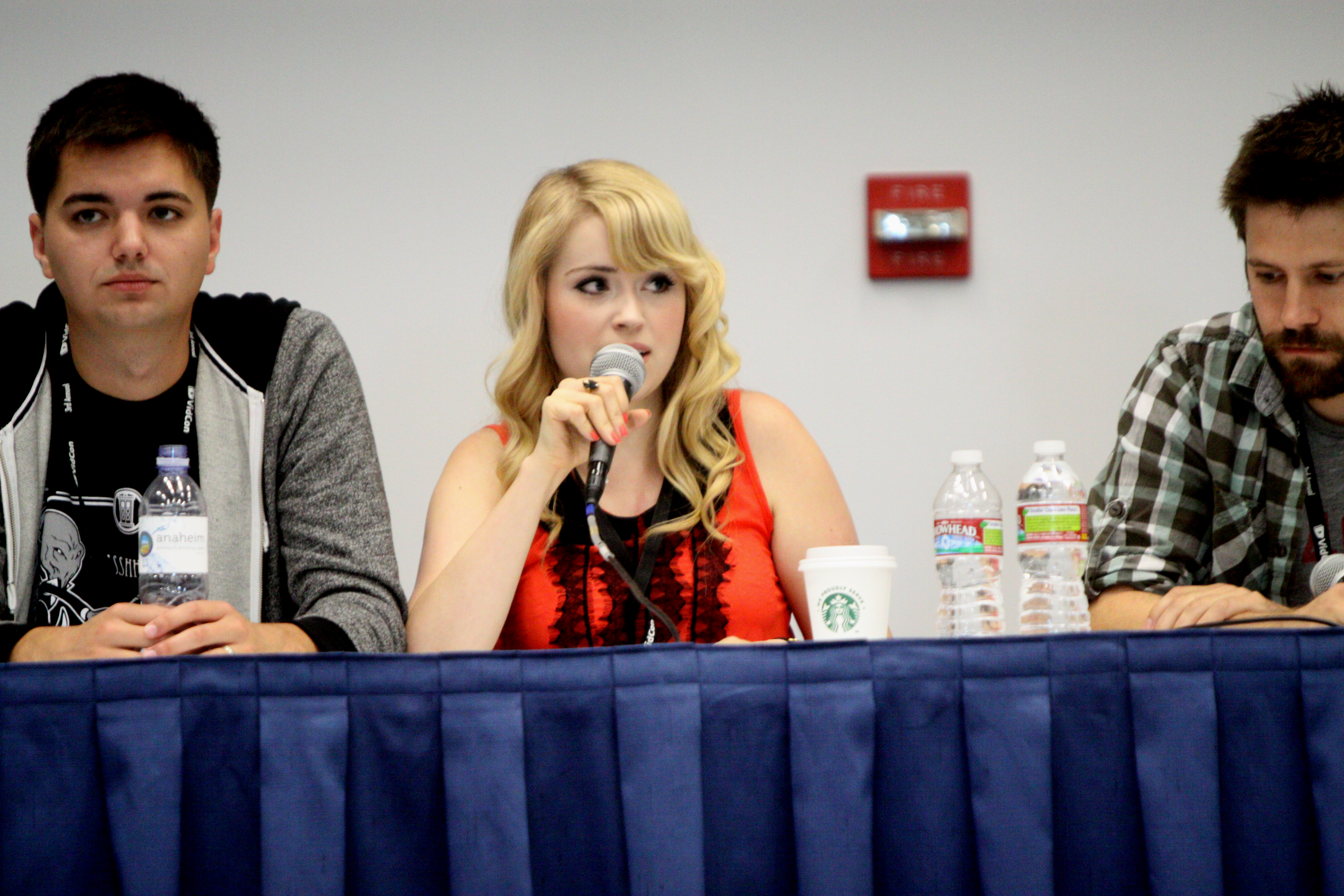
From left to right: Morgan, Newton, and Bereta, the original three hosts of SourceFed

SourceFed Studios launched and operated various channels during its existence:

- SourceFed: The main channel ran from 2012–2017 and featured numerous hosts. YouTube content creator Joe Bereta of Barats and Bereta, actor Elliott Morgan, and comedian Lee Newton, were introduced as the original three hosts of SourceFed. DeFranco, who hand-selected the three, also appeared as a host for the channel's first two weeks. DeFranco also hand-selected a second batch of three hosts (Trisha Hershberger, Meg Turney, and Steve Zaragoza) who debuted on the channel in 2012. After the launch of Nerd, Bereta, Morgan, and Newton primarily hosted on the main SourceFed news channel; Hershberger, Turney, and Zaragoza primarily hosted on the Nerd channel. All but Zaragoza would eventually leave the channel throughout 2014 and 2015. Sam Bashor, Candace Carrizales, Bree Essrig, Ross Everett, Mike Falzone, Maude Garrett, Ava Gordy, William Haynes, Matt Lieberman, and Reina Scully, were also all part of the channel's personnel.
- SourceFedNerd: This channel focused on gaming and technology related topics. After the launch of Nerd, Bereta, Morgan, and Newton primarily hosted on the main SourceFed news channel; Hershberger, Turney, and Zaragoza primarily hosted on the Nerd channel. Additionally, recurring SourceFed guest Whitney Moore, and writer and comedian Filup Molina joined Bashor as full-time hosts on the Nerd channel. On the Nerd channel, several topics relating to nerd culture are covered. When conventions related to the fields of gaming and technology occurred, such as the Consumer Electronics Show (CES), the channel sent some of its hosting personalities to cover news from the convention. During her time on the channel, Trisha Hershberger was a frequent on-field reporter, as well as generally associated with discussing tech news.
- ForHumanPeoples (FHP) / Nuclear Family: This was originally launched as DeFranco's merchandising branch in 2013, based on a website DeFranco founded in 2011. Sam Bashor frequently appeared on the channel, but would leave to join as a host on SourceFed. The channel was later rebranded as Nuclear Family. Featuring comedy sketches, Nuclear Family was primarily worked on by Lieberman, Essrig, and Zaragoza.
- Super Panic Frenzy (SPF): In 2015, a gaming-focused sister channel was launched. YouTube personality Steven Suptic was brought on to host SPF along with Scully. SPF also hosted livestreams on Twitch. SPF was shut down in April 2016, causing Suptic to be temporarily released from the SourceFed Studios staff and Scully to return as a host on the Nerd channel. Suptic was brought back on the staff in September.
- People Be Like (PBL): A sister channel that was hosted by Haynes. Originally launched as a series on the main SourceFed channel in August 2014, People Be Like moved onto its own eponymous channel in 2015. In June 2016, Yessica Hernandez-Cruz was introduced as William Haynes' co-host on PBL. PBL was cancelled in March 2017, along with SourceFed and Nerd.

== Awards and nominations ==
Awards and nominations for SourceFed Studios
Year	Award Show	Category	Result	Recipient(s)
2013	3rd Streamy Awards	Best News and Culture Series	Nominated	SourceFed channel
2013	3rd Streamy Awards	Best Live Series	Nominated	SourceFed: The Nation Decides 2012
2013	3rd Streamy Awards	Best Live Event	Nominated	SourceFed: #PDSLive 2012 Election Night Coverage
2013	3rd Streamy Awards	Audience Choice for Series of the Year	Won	SourceFed channel
2014	4th Streamy Awards	Audience Choice for Channel, Show, or Series of the Year	Nominated	SourceFed channel
2014	4th Streamy Awards	Gaming	Nominated	SourceFedNerd channel
2014	4th Streamy Awards	News and Current Events Series	Won	SourceFed channel
2015	5th Streamy Awards	Audience Choice for Channel, Show, or Series of the Year	Nominated	SourceFed channel
2015	5th Streamy Awards	Best News and Culture Series	Nominated	SourceFed channel
