= Reina Scully =

Japanese-American YouTuber (born 1988)

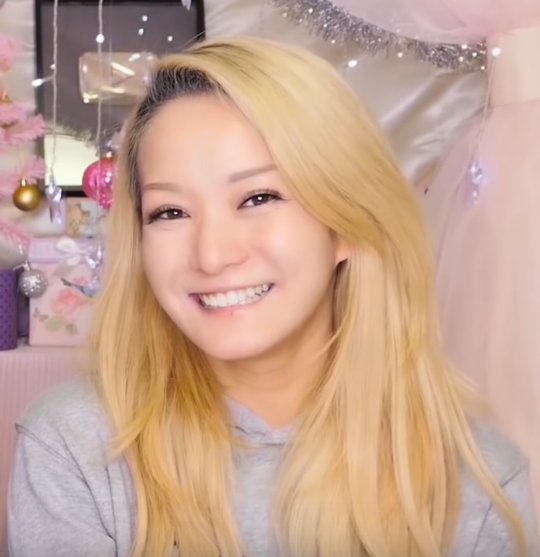
- Scully in 2019
- Born: Reina Suzuki; August 21, 1988 (age 37); Shizuoka Prefecture, Japan
- Occupations: YouTuber; translator; vlogger; voice actress

YouTube information
- Channel: ReinaScully
- Years active: 2011–present
- Genre: Travel vlog
- Subscribers: 417 thousand
- Views: 30.5 million
- Last updated: April 4, 2026

Reina Suzuki (born August 21, 1988), known professionally as Reina Scully, is a Japanese-American YouTuber, vlogger, translator, and voice actress.

Online, she has gained a following for her hosting on various YouTube channels and series such as SourceFed and its SourceFedNerd spinoff, Crunchyroll, and First We Feast's Gochi Gang.

== Early and personal life ==
Scully was born in a small town in Shizuoka Prefecture, Japan, and moved to New Jersey when she was three. She later studied psychology at Rutgers University. She moved back to Japan in 2018. She is married to her husband Mike Flusk. They have one daughter.

== Online career ==
Scully adopted her stage name as a reference to X-Files character Dana Scully. She launched her YouTube channel on October 17, 2011. On her channel she discusses Japanese culture and media including anime reviews and travel vlogs.

She began to garner popularity on the platform after appearing on SourceFed videos. Her first appearance for SourceFed was in March 2014 on the secondary SourceFedNerd channel; she appeared alongside Meg Turney in an anime club-styled video discussing Tonari no Seki-kun. SourceFed Studios later brought Scully on as permanent host and she primarily appeared on the Nerd channel. In 2015, Discovery Digital Networks (DDN), SourceFed's parent company, launched Super Panic Frenzy (SPF), a gaming YouTube channel. Scully and Steven Suptic were the hosts of SPF, until it became defunct in 2016.

Scully appeared with fellow SourceFed hosts at VidCon 2015 and 2016. In 2016, Scully left SourceFed; in her announcement of her departure from the channel she specifically thanked SourceFed founder Philip DeFranco, referring to him as a mentor. In 2017, after Discovery Communications sold its DDN portfolio to Group Nine Media, SourceFedNerd was briefly rebranded as NowThis Nerd. Scully voiced staunch criticism of the rebrand.

In 2018, Scully criticized Logan Paul in the wake of his suicide forest video. Following this, Scully received racist messages and cyberbullying from some of Paul's audience.

Later that February, Scully was brought on by digital studio Life Noggin to host Play Noggin Game Night. The series was streamed on Twitch and featured Scully and her guests playing video games and posing trivia questions related to those titles.

In November 2019, the YouTube channel First We Feast launched Gochi Gang, a series hosted by Scully featuring her discuss Japanese culture, with a heavy focus on Japanese cuisine. Guests on the series have included DeFranco, Claire Saffitz, Sean Evans, Denzel Curry, and Asuka. Scully appeared on Pizza Wars, another series distributed by First We Feast, in 2021.

In April 2025, she co-hosted Star Wars Celebration live from Japan.

== Translating career and work in anime ==
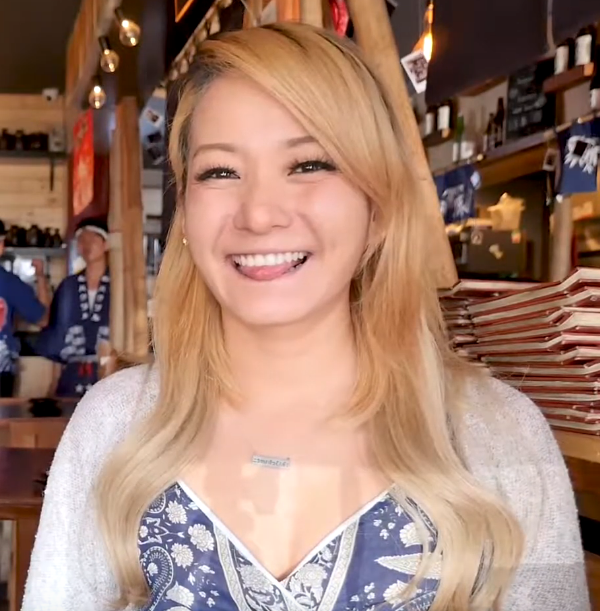
Reina Scully in 2018

Scully is also known for her translating career, which she stated began in high school: "I've been translating and interpreting professionally since high school for a myriad of different companies so I was already well trained in that job field and wanted to gear it towards entertainment, which is when I started laser focusing on translating Japanese dramas and anime [for English audiences]." Her translating credits include Akame ga Kill! and Baby Steps.

Her translating skills led her to a career working with Crunchyroll. She appeared on the company's "Anime Academy" panel at Anime Expo 2018. Scully has also been noted for being a personality on Crunchyroll's YouTube channel and podcast.

In addition to her career on YouTube and in translating, Scully has also provided the voices for characters in RWBY and Urahara.

In May 2019, Scully produced Mecha-Ude, a Kickstarter-funded anime series and temporarily released the pilot episode onto her YouTube channel. In September 2022, Pony Canyon announced that an anime television series adaptation has been green-lit.
