= Domio =

US apartment-hotel rental service

- Website type: Privately held company
- Founded: June 22, 2016; 10 years ago
- Headquarters: New York City
- Area served: United States
- Founders: Jay Roberts; Adrian Lam
- Key people: Jim Mrha, CEO; Calvin Anderson, CCO; Leslie Pchola, COO; Brian Quinn, CDO
- Industry: Lodging
- Website: www.staydomio.com

Domio was an apartment-hotel rental service catering to group travelers. It is headquartered in New York City and has locations in several cities in the United States. The company leased parts of residential buildings, furnished the units, and then rented them to travelers.

The name "Domio" is a portmanteau of "dom" from domicile, meaning home, and "mio", to signal personalization.

After failing to raise $10 million in additional capital, Domio shut down operations in November 2020 and sold its assets through an assignment for the benefit of creditors, with Sherwood Partners overseeing the sale.

== History ==
Domio was founded in June 2016 and launched in August 2016 by Jay Roberts and Adrian Lam, both former real estate investment bankers at BofA Securities.

In October 2018, Domio raised a $12 million Series A round from Tribeca Venture Partners and SoftBank Capital. In September 2018, Upper90 invested $50 million into a joint venture with Domio.

In May 2019, the company opened its first location in New Orleans in a joint venture with Upper90. In August 2019, the company raised $100 million, including $50 million of debt from Upper90 and $50 million of equity in a Series B round.

In November 2019, the company leased a 175-room development in Wynwood in Miami, Florida.

== Controversies ==
=== Permits, Lawsuits and Airbnb ===
Domio has come under scrutiny for its business practices in Boston, San Diego, Nashville and other cities. In Boston, Domio set up a fake Airbnb host named "Anthony" and rented out 88 units under the pseudonym.

In June 2019, Domio revenue manager Juan Miguel Rivera Pecunia and marketing director Umer Usman were sent a notice by Metro Nashville Government in Davidson County Circuit Court and received an injunction to stop renting out their North Nashville condominium.

In August 2020, Domio was the subject of an investigative piece where The Information reported alleged business practices inside of the company meant to deceive regulators. Two days before the article was published, Airbnb suspended all Domio properties and accounts for over a month.
