= Animalist =

- Network: YouTube

Programming
- Language: English

Ownership
- Owner: Discovery Digital Networks

History
- Launched: September 10, 2013; 12 years ago
- Closed: June 9, 2016; 9 years ago

Animalist was one of the networks under Discovery Digital Networks based upon animal-themed video content. Launched in Fall of 2013, Animalist, along with Revision3, TestTube, and the Defranco Network make-up the web-original video arm for Discovery Communications. The channel is also famous for previously owning "Brave Wilderness" YouTube Channel hosted by Coyote Peterson that later became independent of the network.

== Shows ==
- Animalist News
- Animal Takedowns with Tay Zonday
- Animals With Low Self Esteem
- Before it Was Cool With Hamilton The Hipster Cat
- Big Cat Rescue
- Cat Mojo with Jackson Galaxy
- Cole & Marmalade
- Discovery World Safari
- Furrocious with Mike Falzone
- Lil BUB's Big Show
- Petsami
- Pudge It Yourself
- Truther Cats
- Weird, Gross and Beautiful with Catie Wayne

=== Past Shows ===
- "Brave Wilderness" - became independent, now owned by Wilderness Production LLC
