= Boxxy =

American Internet celebrity, vlogger and voice actress

- Born: Catherine Wayne; April 28, 1992 (age 34); San Diego, California, U.S.
- Known for: Viral videos

YouTube information
- Channels: boxxybabee; ANewHopeee; bodaciousboxxy
- Years active: 2008–2017
- Genres: Comedy; vlogs
- Subscribers: 370 thousand (boxxybabee); 307 thousand (ANewHopeee); 33.4 thousand (bodaciousboxxy)
- Views: 52.7 million (boxxybabee); 24 million (ANewHopeee); 1.9 million (bodaciousboxxy)
- Last updated: February 26, 2026
- Website: www.catiewayne.com

Catherine Wayne (born April 28, 1992), better known for her character Boxxy in her highly energetic vlogs, is an American Internet celebrity, vlogger and voice actress. Her rise in popularity began in late 2008 and early 2009.

== Career ==
=== Online work ===
In January 2008, Boxxy recorded two videos addressing her friends on Gaia Online and uploaded them to YouTube under the alias boxxybabee. They were reposted to the site i-am-bored.com later in the year and then eventually appeared on 4chan. Wayne responded to the popularity of her initial videos in a third video that was uploaded to her new YouTube channel, boxxybabee, in January 2009. The videos depict Boxxy in heavy eyeliner rambling in an excitable stream-of-consciousness style about various topics and experiences.

The presence of the videos was divisive on 4chan, with factions claiming to either support or oppose Boxxy, leading to various flame wars and hacking incidents. This led to a denial-of-service attack on 4chan itself, shutting the site down for several hours. Participants went elsewhere, launching a "Twitter bomb" that May. On YouTube, the popular Boxxy channel was hacked and the source's identity outed. A number of spoofs, parody videos and remixes were posted throughout the web.

In March 2010, Urlesque named Boxxy number 104 on its list of "The 100 Most Iconic Internet Videos." She was left out of the top 100 list because her videos were relatively new at the time. In late 2010, Boxxy began selling Boxxy items on eBay. On November 25, 2010, she uploaded an edited clip from the film Star Wars: Episode IV – A New Hope under the alias ANewHopeee. The original clip contained Princess Leia's holographic message to Obi-Wan Kenobi. Boxxy replaced Princess Leia's speech with her own request for her fans' help in regaining access to her old account, boxxybabee.

On January 10, 2011, Boxxy posted a new, more introspective video onto a new YouTube account (ANewHopeee) in which she explains that Boxxy started as an exaggerated internet persona representative of her personality and interests at the time of the first recordings but eventually grew into a tongue-in-cheek parody of her younger self in later videos. This video caused some discussions as to its authenticity. On January 19, 2011, Boxxy was mentioned in a local Fox 11 report on Internet trolls.

On June 17, 2011, Boxxy made a third YouTube account (Bodaciousboxxy) and uploaded a single video of herself. In this video, she claims that the Boxxy in the video from January 2011 is not the real Boxxy but a girl who looks like her and was supposedly hacked by a character named "Svetlana."

=== Other work ===
Between December 2013 and December 2014, Boxxy was a host for the Animalist streaming series for Discovery Digital Networks.

In 2017, Boxxy voiced the character Marsha for Disney XD's Billy Dilley's Super-Duper Subterranean Summer.

In 2018, Boxxy lent her voice to BoxxyQuest: The Gathering Storm, an indie role-playing game satirizing various aspects of internet culture. She is credited with both conceptualization and voice-over work as the game's protagonist.

== Personal life ==
Boxxy is of Greek descent.
