= XLR8R =

Web magazine

- Founded: 1993
- Final issue: 2011 (print)
- Company: Buzz Media
- Country: United States
- Based in: San Francisco, California
- Website: www.xlr8r.com
- ISSN: 1526-4246
- OCLC: 42250168

XLR8R (pronounced "accelerator") is a website that covers music, culture, style, and technology. It was originally also a print magazine.

== History and profile ==
XLR8R was founded as a newsprint zine in 1993 by publisher Andrew Smith in Seattle. It has offices in San Francisco and New York City. While XLR8R's initial focus was on electronic music, it has widened its scope to include indie rock, hip-hop, and reggae/dancehall music as well as related trends in style, art, fashion, and technology.

XLR8R was published 10 times per year and distributed internationally. Special issues included a Music Technology issue, a year-end "Best Of" issue, and an entire issue devoted to the music scene of a particular city (Berlin, San Francisco, Los Angeles, Chicago, New York City, etc.). Subscribers receive Incite, a free monthly CD of tracks hand-picked by the magazine's editors.

Standout features of the publication include "Audiofile," a collection of short pieces on up-and-coming musicians; "Machines," a section devoted to technology (reviews, recording techniques of various artists, etc.); "Vis-Ed," a showcase of emerging illustrators, photographers, and designers; and "Bitter Bastard," a curmudgeonly rant on various frustrating topics within the music world. Each issue traditionally has hundreds of reviews of various albums, singles, compilations, books, and DVDs.

XLR8R's website features breaking music and culture news, high-resolution music videos and free weekly MP3 downloads and podcasts. Additionally, back issues of the print magazine are accessible from 2003 to the present as freely downloadable PDFs.

In March 2007, XLR8R launched XLR8R TV, an internet TV show hosted by Revision3, with a new episode appearing every Tuesday. The show features musicians, artists and scenes covered in the pages of XLR8R magazine.

In 2011, XLR8R ceased publication of their print magazine and became a web only publication.

In 2012, XLR8R was acquired by Buzz Media.

In December 2024, XLR8R announced a "pause" in the creation of new content due to a lack of financial resources.
