= Kerry Lauerman =

American journalist

Kerry Lauerman is an American journalist. He is executive editor at Forbes. He has been the top editor at Mic and Salon, a senior editor at The Washington Post and Mother Jones and co-founder of the animal-focused site The Dodo.

== Education ==
He attended Indiana University Bloomington for a bachelor's degree in journalism.
