= Mic (media company) =

American internet and media company

- Website type: News
- Available in: English
- Founded: 2011; 15 years ago (as PolicyMic)
- Headquarters: New York City, New York, {{{location_country}}}
- Owner: Bustle Digital Group
- Founders: Chris Altchek; Jake Horowitz
- Website: mic.com
- Registration: Optional
- Current status: Active

Mic is an American internet and media company based in New York City that caters to millennials.

Originally known as PolicyMic, it rose to prominence after its on-the-ground coverage of the Tunisian Revolution in 2011. In April 2014, the company reached 19 million unique monthly visitors.

On November 29, 2018, Mic laid off the majority of their staff—60 to 70 people—after Facebook canceled a deal to publish a news video series.

== History ==
Mic was co-founded in 2011 as PolicyMic by Chris Altchek and Jake Horowitz, two high school friends from New York. In January 2014, the two were named to the annual list of Forbes 30 Under 30.

In 2014, the company announced it would re-brand their organization to target millennials, renaming themselves as "Mic". The company purchased the domain name for a reported $500,000 and explained the name change as the company reflecting its "expanded focus and bold vision." Later in 2014, Chris Miles, the managing editor of news, was fired over allegations of plagiarism.

Mic's news director, Jared Keller, was fired in February 2015 after the blog website Gawker found various levels of plagiarism in 20 different passages of his work. In March 2016, Mic acquired curated video app Hyper as well its developer, AntiHero.

Past advisors to the company include David Shipley, executive editor of Bloomberg View and former op-ed page editor at The New York Times, and Jacob Lewis, the former managing editor of The New Yorker. Allison Goldberg, senior vice president of Time Warner Investments, joined Mic's board of directors in April 2017.

Mic senior reporter Jack Smith IV was fired in September 2018 after several sexual misconduct accusations against him were published on Jezebel.

On November 29, 2018, a majority of the staff were laid off after Facebook canceled a video deal with the company. Altchek notified staff during an all-hands meeting, saying that "Facebook caught us by surprise at a really bad time" and that "The majority of the teams including people, finance, HR, productions, video, editorial, marketing, revenue and executive team will be departing, effective today." The same day, Mic was sold to Bustle Media Group for less than $5 million, which was a fraction of the "hundreds of millions" that Altchek said the site was worth in 2017.

== Content ==
Since 2018, Mic has produced video content covering social justice and progressive issues, described as "serious issues important to young people", distributed through the Mic website and through social media. This content is supplemented with advertorial videos produced for clients.

Writing for Forbes in 2014, Abe Brown described PolicyMic's style as hyperbolic, with a mix of serious analysis of issues and attention-seeking listicles. Brown grouped the site with Upworthy, BuzzFeed, and Business Insider as opposed to more conventional news media such as The New York Times and The Washington Post. In an effort to improve Mic's editorial quality, the company recruited Cory Haik as publisher, and Kerry Lauerman as executive editor, both from The Post.

The site sometimes enlists politician and celebrity contributors; these have included Senator Rand Paul, former Secretary of State Condoleezza Rice, Senator Kirsten Gillibrand and radio host Daisy Rosario. In December 2013, the White House worked with Mic on what was called an "Open Mic" competition to "make health care work for our generation".

== Funding and revenue ==
Mic generates revenue through advertising known as "branded content". Digiday.com reported in November 2014 that "brands like Microsoft, Cole Haan, Cadillac and most recently GE have all tapped Mic in the last few months in the hopes of using its millennial expertise to reach the site's audience of educated 20-somethings".

The New York Observer positively reacted to the company's financial practices in 2014, saying that Mic had not made a profit and "is in the increasingly rare habit of actually paying each one of its contributors".

As of April 2017, the company had raised $52 million in funding from investors, including Lightspeed Venture Partners, Lerer Ventures, Advancit Capital, Red Swan Ventures, The John S. and James L. Knight Foundation, Time Warner Investments, Kyu Collective and You & Mr Jones. The company has not disclosed its valuation, though The Wall Street Journal reported in April 2017 that it was "in the range of the 'mid hundreds of millions' of dollars."

The company laid off several employees in late 2017, as did other digital media companies. Inconsistencies in tracking viewer numbers, changes in Facebook's algorithms and advertising rates, and an overemphasis on search-friendly text stories were all cited as partial reasons. The company shifted business models, with less content being produced overall in favor of longer-form video journalism covering social justice and progressive causes. Business Insider cited the company's strategy as an example of the "pivot to video" idea common among digital media companies during that time.

== See also ==
- Mashable
