= Billy Dilley's Super-Duper Subterranean Summer =

American animated television series

- Also known as: Billy Dilley
- Genre: Comedy; Adventure; Science fantasy; Slapstick
- Created by: Aaron Springer
- Voices of: Aaron Springer; Tom Kenny; Catherine Wayne
- Theme music composer: Jeremy Fisher
- Opening theme: "Billy Dilley" (performed by Jeremy Fisher)
- Ending theme: "Catch Me If You Can" (performed by Jeremy Fisher)
- Composer: David Ricard
- Country of origin: United States
- Original language: English
- No. of seasons: 1
- No. of episodes: 13 (25 segments)

Production
- Executive producer: Aaron Springer
- Animator: Rough Draft Korea
- Running time: 22 minutes
- Production company: Disney Television Animation

Original release
- Network: Disney XD
- Release: June 3 – June 15, 2017

Billy Dilley's Super-Duper Subterranean Summer is an American animated television series created by Aaron Springer, who previously worked on the Nickelodeon animated series SpongeBob SquarePants from seasons 1 to 8. The series lasted for one season and aired on Disney XD from June 3 to June 15, 2017.

== Plot ==
The show follows the adventures of Billy Dilley (Aaron Springer), a 7th grader who loves science, and his lab partners, Zeke (Tom Kenny) and Marsha (Catherine Wayne), and his pet rat, Anaximander, who on summer vacation find themselves trapped in Subterranea-Tania, a strange world located in the Earth's core after a test ride in Billy's science fair project The Cheeserator, a giant drilling machine designed for cutting holes in enormous Swiss cheese, goes horribly wrong.

== Characters ==
- Billy Dilley (voiced by Aaron Springer) is an eccentric science-obsessed 12-year old boy who is more observant and often willing to explore much of the creatures in Subterranea-Tania. He is often described as silly, weird, trouble-prone, and overall optimistic.
- Zeke (voiced by Tom Kenny) is a long-haired slacker who was assigned to work with Billy. He often tries to appear cool and aloof, but in reality, can get emotional quite easily. He is considered the voice of reason and usually makes sarcastic remarks. Zeke also tends to be a talented chef, often making calzones and pancakes.
- Marsha (voiced by Boxxy) is a wannabe social butterfly and budding journalist who was assigned to work with Billy. She is very impressionable and lively, if somewhat spacey at times.
- Anaximander is Billy's silent pet rat who spends much of the episodes lazing around.
- Judy (voiced by Sarah-Nicole Robles) is a female swamp monster that Billy befriends, and later becomes his love interest.
- Count Raymond Wretcher (voiced by James Arnold Taylor) is a green-skinned tyrant who dreams of covering the surface with sludge. He pretends to be friendly towards Billy as an attempt to steal the Cheeserator to bring up to the surface.
- Mrs. Wretcher (voiced by Kerri Kenney-Silver) is Count Wretcher's overbearing mother, who often complains to her son about spreading sludge outside the castle grounds. She is never physically seen as she only appears as a portrait with a speaker below to communicate with others.
- Big Doug (voiced by Brian Doyle-Murray) is a mammoth farmer and owner of "Big Doug's Wonderful World of Wigs".
- Hag Witch (voiced by Susanne Blakeslee) is a witch who has a massive crush on Count Wretcher. Billy works for her as her apprentice.
- The Troggies are primitive gorilla-like creatures in Subterranea-Tania.
  - Yucky (voiced by Richard Steven Horvitz) is a young Troggie who is friends with Billy. His vocabulary consists almost entirely of his own name. While he can be naïve and mischievous, Yucky tends to be very intelligent.
- Tony (voiced by Kenny Pittenger) is a talking snail who was formerly an apprentice to the Hag Witch and a friend to Billy.
- The Gorks are a tribe of lizard man who have a hatred for surface-dwellers. In "Lab Friends… Forever?", they were convinced that Billy, Zeke, and Marsha were the ultra-rare Wormasaurus Rex.
  - Gorkager (voiced by Brian Posehn) is the wise leader of the Gorks. While he is intelligent, he tends to be aggressive at times.
  - Chancellor Gork (voiced by Aaron Springer) is the second-in-command to Gorkager. He only appears in the first episode, mistaking Billy for an entertainer.
  - The Great Gork in the Celing (voiced by Kevin Michael Richardson) is the god of the Gorks who lives in the clouds of Subterranea-Tania.
- Gregory P. Zartran (voiced by Travis Willingham) is a golden-haired Conan the Barbarian-like figure who is actually a homeless conman desperately trying to look for a good home and food.
- Francis, also known as Gumbrump, (voiced by Kevin Michael Richardson), is a hairy, brown cyclops who is said to be Zartran's archenemy, but is actually his best friend.
- Thurston (voiced by Tom Kenny) is the servant to Count Wretcher and Mrs. Wretcher.
- The Orangutanasaurs are orangutan-like creatures who are similar to the Troggies, but they speak better.
- The Mushroom Prince (voiced by Aaron Springer) is the ruler of Subterranea-Tania's mushroom patch. He appears in the episode "The Mushroom Prince".
- Aunt Agnes (voiced by Mary Jo Catlett) is an elderly lizard woman who is secretly a member of the Subterranea-Tania police. She appears in the episode "Billy/Willie".
- Ogre Chef (voiced by Fred Tatasciore) is a muscular, pink-skinned ogre who lives in a cave. He appears in the episode "Calzones".
- Hag Sisters (voiced by Tom Kenny and Boxxy) are the Hag Witch's two sisters who are said to be beauticians. They appear in the episode "Silly Spheres".
- Jared (voiced by Andy Milonakis) is a carnivorous jellyfish-like monster that ended suffering from amnesia and befriending Zeke and Marsha.
- Sluggy (vocal effects by Fred Tatasciore) is a slug who Billy befriends as a pet after feeling ignored by Anaximander. He appears in the episode "Sluggy".
- Mud Men are slimy creatures who live in Subterranea-Tania. In "The Date", Billy and Zeke disguised a Mud Man as Marsha's summer love, Greg Hastings.

== Episodes ==
The series consists of 13 half-hour episodes, with most of them containing 2 11-minute segments, with the final episode being a full-length episode. The series was originally greenlit for 20 episodes, but was cut down during production.

No.	Title	Timing directed by	Written by	Storyboard by	Original release date	Prod. code	U.S. viewers (millions)
1a	"Lab Friends... Forever?"	George S. Chialtas	Merriwether Williams, Sam Cherington, Zeus Cervas, Kenny Pittenger, Aaron Springer and Clay Morrow	Zeus Cervas, Kenny Pittenger, Aaron Springer and Clay Morrow	June 3, 2017	BD101	0.19
When Billy Dilley's science fair project the Cheeserator gets struck by lightning and goes haywire, Billy, his lab partners Zeke and Marsha, and his pet rat Anaximander, find themselves stuck in a strange underground land called Subterranea-Tania.
1b	"Surviving Billy"	Helen Roh	Merriwether Williams, Sam Cherington, Charlotte Jackson, Aaron Springer and Clay Morrow	Charlotte Jackson, Ryan Jouas, Aaron Springer, Clay Morrow and Chuck Klein	June 3, 2017	BD102	0.19
On their second day in Subterranea-Tania, Billy, Zeke, and Marsha find their way back to the Cheeserator after getting kidnapped by a vicious Pterosaur. After getting back to the Cheeserator, the trio builds a house made out of extra parts for safety.
2a	"Hey Judy"	Helen Roh	Zeus Cervas, Sam Cherington, Damon Jones, Kenny Pittenger, Clay Morrow, Aaron Springer and Merriwether Williams	Zeus Cervas and Kenny Pittenger	June 7, 2017	BD103	0.10
A cute female swamp creature called Judy falls head over heels with Billy, who is too busy dealing with a crush of his own, a common earthworm who he names "Lisa".
2b	"Count Wretcher"	George S. Chialtas	Merriwether Williams, Damon Jones, Andy Gonsalves, Kenny Pittenger, Chong Suk Lee, Clay Morrow and Aaron Springer	Andy Gonsalves, Kenny Pittenger, Chong Suk Lee, Clay Morrow and Aaron Springer	June 6, 2017	BD104	0.10
Billy strikes up a friendship with the sludge-obsessed Count Wretcher, who offers to help fix the Cheeserator for his own nefarious plans.
3a	"Calzones"	Helen Roh	Drew Applegate, Sam Cherington, Damon Jones, Dennis Messner, Andrew Overtoom, Aaron Springer, Clay Morrow and Merriwether Williams	Drew Applegate, Dennis Messner, Clay Morrow, Andrew Overtoom and Aaron Springer	June 4, 2017	BD106	0.17
Zeke, the "King of Calzones", must defend his title when a rival chef enters the picture.
3b	"Crab Hands"	George S. Chialtas	Sam Cherington, Derek Drymon, Andy Gonsalves, Chong Suk Lee, Clay Morrow, Andrew Overtoom, Aaron Springer, Dave Tennant and Merriwether Williams	Andy Gonsalves and Chong Suk Lee	June 4, 2017	BD105	0.17
Billy invents a grafting machine and starts adding different creature parts to his body, but the creatures are off to get him.
4a	"The Date"	Helen Roh	Clay Morrow and Aaron Springer	Aaron Springer	June 5, 2017	BD108	0.08
When Marsha learns she has missed her date with her summer camp crush Greg Hastings, Billy and Zeke attempt to cheer her up by fixing her up with a subterranean replacement.
4b	"The Troggies Next Door"	George S. Chialtas	Casey Alexander, Drew Applegate, Derek Iversen, Damon Jones, Dennis Messner, Clay Morrow, Andrew Overtoom, Aaron Springer and Merriwether Williams	Casey Alexander, Drew Applegate, Dennis Messner, Clay Morrow and Aaron Springer	June 5, 2017	BD107	0.08
Zeke feels intimidated by a primitive tribe called the Troggies, who can do everything better than he does.
5a	"The Mushroom Prince"	Helen Roh	Merriwether Williams, Damon Jones, Luke Brookshier, Charlotte Jackson, Aaron Springer and Clay Morrow	Luke Brookshier and Charlotte Jackson	June 6, 2017	BD109	0.10
Marsha starts a newsletter about Subterranea-Tania and Billy is desperate to know what she's written about him.
5b	"Welcome to the Hag House"	George S. Chialtas	Zeus Cervas, Sam Cherington, Derek Iversen, Damon Jones, Clay Morrow, Andrew Overtoom, Kenny Pittenger, Aaron Springer and Merriwether Williams	Zeus Cervas, Clay Morrow, Kenny Pittenger and Aaron Springer	June 7, 2017	BD110	0.10
When Billy becomes the new apprentice to Subterranea-Tania's resident sorceress Hag Witch, the two concoct a love potion to try on Count Wretcher.
6a	"Beastie Billy"	Jungja Kim-Wolf	Luke Brookshier, Charlotte Jackson, Derek Iversen, Damon Jones, Clay Morrow, Andrew Overtoom, Aaron Springer and Merriwether Williams	Luke Brookshier, Charlotte Jackson, Clay Morrow and Aaron Springer	June 8, 2017	BD111	0.07
Marsha is convinced that Billy has been cursed after he takes a rock from a sacred patch for scientific analysis.
6b	"Zartran"	Tom Pope	Zeus Cervas, Derek Iversen, Damon Jones, Clay Morrow, Andrew Overtoom, Kenny Pittenger, Aaron Springer and Merriwether Williams	Zeus Cervas, Clay Morrow, Kenny Pittenger and Aaron Springer	June 8, 2017	BD112	0.07
A barbarian named Zartran moves in with Billy and friends, and entertains them with stories of his epic battle with the Gumbrump, but he turns out to be a fraud as he tricks the trio into leaving their home..
7a	"'K' is for Klutz"	Tom Pope	Wolf Rudiger-Bloss, Luke Brookshier, Zeus Cervas, Sam Cherington, Clay Morrow, Andrew Overtoom, Kenny Pittenger, Aaron Springer and Merriwether Williams	Wolf Rudiger-Bloss, Luke Brookshier, Zeus Cervas, Clay Morrow, Kenny Pittenger and Aaron Springer	June 9, 2017	BD113	0.14
When Marsha suddenly becomes extremely klutzy, Billy goes through great lengths to keep her away from his ant farm.
7b	"Tommy X"	George S. Chialtas	Ben Adams, Derek Iversen, Damon Jones, Clay Morrow, Andrew Overtoom, Aaron Springer, Jonny Van Orman and Merriwether Williams	Ben Adams, Clay Morrow, Aaron Springer and Jonny Van Orman	June 9, 2017	BD120	0.14
Zeke tries to impress his extreme sports hero Tommy X when he pays a visit to Subterranea-Tania, but he seems to hang out with Billy more. Guest Star: Steve-O as Tommy X
8a	"Billy/Willie"	Tom Pope	Drew Applegate, Derek Iversen, Dennis Messner, Kyle More, Clay Morrow, Andrew Overtoom, Aaron Springer and Merriwether Williams	Casey Alexander (storyboard director) Drew Applegate, Dennis Messner, Clay Morrow and Aaron Springer	June 10, 2017	BD124	0.09
Zartran returns to swindle Aunt Agnes out of her treasure by getting Billy to pose as her long-lost nephew Willie.
8b	"The Telltale Wart"	Helen Roh	Ben Adams, Casey Alexander, Mike Bertino, Sam Cherington, Clay Morrow, Andrew Overtoom, Aaron Springer and Merriwether Williams	Casey Alexander (storyboard director) Ben Adams, Casey Alexander, Mike Bertino, Clay Morrow and Aaron Springer	June 10, 2017	BD116	0.09
Billy becomes obsessed with his Troggie friend Yucky's wart, and decides to transfer it onto his body without Yucky's permission, but guilt starts to kicks in.
9a	"Ol' MacBilly"	George S. Chialtas	Drew Applegate, Mike Bertino, Derek Iversen, Dennis Messner, Kyle More, Clay Morrow, Sarah Oleksyk, Andrew Overtoom, Aaron Springer and Merriwether Williams	Kenny Pittenger (storyboard director) Drew Applegate, Mike Bertino, Dennis Messner, Clay Morrow, Sarah Oleksyk, Andrew Overtoom and Aaron Springer	June 11, 2017	BD117	0.01
Teased by a gang of lizard youths for his hair, Billy decides to save up for a wig by looking after Big Doug's prized mammoth.
9b	"Silly Spheres"	Tom Pope	Ben Adams, Clay Morrow, Andrew Overtoom, Kenny Pittenger, Aaron Springer and Merriwether Williams	Kenny Pittenger (storyboard director) Ben Adams, Clay Morrow, Kenny Pittenger and Aaron Springer	June 11, 2017	BD130	0.01
Billy, Tony and Yucky guard Hag Witch's house while she's out, but they can't resist breaking into her spells cabinet.
10a	"Wretcherous Treachery"	Helen Roh	Zeus Cervas, Derek Iversen, Kyle More, Clay Morrow, Andrew Overtoom, Aaron Springer, Jonny Van Orman and Merriwether Williams	Zeus Cervas (storyboard director) Zeus Cervas, Clay Morrow, Aaron Springer and Jonny Van Orman	June 12, 2017	BD136	0.10
Tired of being castle-bound by his domineering mother, Count Wretcher breaks loose and tries to convince Billy and friends to continue fixing the Cheeserator.
10b	"Jared"	Tom Pope	Sam Cherington, Clay Morrow, Andrew Overtoom, Kenny Pittenger, Chris Reccardi, Aaron Springer and Merriwether Williams	Clay Morrow, Kenny Pittenger, Chris Reccardi and Aaron Springer	June 12, 2017	BD128	0.10
Billy grows jealous when Zeke and Marsha befriend a strange creature called Jared, who eventually turns out to be a hideous flesh-eater who suffered from amnesia.
11a	"Sluggy"	Helen Roh	Luke Brookshier, Derek Iversen, Charlotte Jackson, Damon Jones, Clay Morrow, Andrew Overtoom, Aaron Springer and Merriwether Williams	Luke Brookshier, Charlotte Jackson, Clay Morrow and Aaron Springer	June 13, 2017	BD126	0.13
Feeling ignored by Anaximander, Billy decides to take in a new pet, a slug called Sluggy.
11b	"Double Bubble"	George S. Chialtas	Luke Brookshier, Derek Iversen, Charlotte Jackson, Kyle More, Clay Morrow, Andrew Overtoom, Aaron Springer and Merriwether Williams	Luke Brookshier, Charlotte Jackson, Clay Morrow and Aaron Springer	June 13, 2017	BD132	0.13
When Zeke starts avoiding his chores by throwing his trash on the roof, he and Billy end up dealing with a large-scale garbage problem on their hands.
12a	"The Glorp of the Gorks"	Jungja Kim-Wolf	Zeus Cervas, Derek Iversen, Damon Jones, Kyle More, Clay Morrow, Andrew Overtoom, Kenny Pittenger, Aaron Springer and Merriwether Williams	Zeus Cervas, Clay Morrow, Kenny Pittenger and Aaron Springer	June 14, 2017	BD121	0.10
When the Gorks' sacred slime is tampered with, Billy is enlisted to help find the culprit.
12b	"Rat's Entertainment!"	Tom Pope	Drew Applegate, Zeus Cervas, Derek Iversen, Dennis Messner, Kyle More, Clay Morrow, Andrew Overtoom, Kenny Pittenger, Aaron Springer and Merriwether Williams	Drew Applegate, Zeus Cervas, Dennis Messner, Clay Morrow, Kenny Pittenger and Aaron Springer	June 14, 2017	BD138	0.10
When Anaximander starts molting his fur, the people of Subterranea-Tania decide to put on a show to make him feel better.
13	"The Battle for Subterranea-Tania"	Helen Roh, George S. Chialtas, Jungja Kim-Wolf, and Tom Pope	Casey Alexander, Mike Bertino, Derek Iversen, Kyle More, Clay Morrow, Andrew Overtoom, Aaron Springer, and Merriwether Williams Zeus Cervas, Derek Iversen, Kyle More, Clay Morrow, Andrew Overtoom, Kenny Pittenger, Aaron Springer, and Merriwether Williams	Casey Alexander (storyboard director) Casey Alexander, Mike Bertino, Clay Morrow and Aaron Springer Zeus Cervas and Kenny Pittenger (storyboard directors) Zeus Cervas, Clay Morrow, Andrew Overtoom, Kenny Pittenger and Aaron Springer	June 15, 2017	BD139–140	0.14
As Billy, Zeke and Marsha prepare to leave Subterranea-Tania by throwing a "farewell party", Billy accidentally causes a robot-alien invasion led by an evil clone of Billy. The people of Subterranea-Tania then turn against Billy and it's up to the trio to try to stop the invasion once and for all.

== Production ==
The show was first announced in 2014 as a potential pilot. In March 2016, it was confirmed that Disney XD has greenlit the show for a full series along with Country Club (which later became Big City Greens).

In 2015, Merriwether Williams was confirmed in a Twitter post by Vincent Waller as one of the show's writers, whilst character designer Robertryan Cory announced on his Tumblr page he has been working on the series since December 2014, just over a year before the pickup was officially announced.

Jessica McKenna was originally chosen to be the voice of Billy Dilley. However, creator Aaron Springer was ultimately chosen in that role.

== Broadcast ==
=== Release ===
Billy Dilley's Super-Duper Subterranean Summer aired on Disney XD in Canada on June 5. In Germany, Disney XD aired the series on July 7. In the United Kingdom and Ireland, the show aired on Disney XD on September 18, 2017. In Australia and New Zealand, the series aired on Disney XD in October 2017.

=== Streaming services ===
All episodes from Billy Dilley's Super-Duper Subterranean Summer are available on Google Play, Apple TV, Prime Video, iTunes Store and Disney+.

== Reception ==
Emily Ashby of Common Sense Media gave the series 3 out of 5 stars; saying "This new world of Billy's appeals to kids' sense of imagination, even if it does so with more nonsense than anything else. The show is visually pleasing, boasts a talented voice cast, and is filled with nonstop action and laughs."
