= Eric Hippeau =

French-born American businessman

- Born: August 16, 1951; Paris, France
- Education: Lycee Francais de Londres
- Occupations: Investor, businessperson

Eric Hippeau is a partner at Lerer Hippeau Ventures in New York City.

== Early life and education ==
Hippeau graduated from the Lycee Francais de Londres and attended the Sorbonne University in Paris.

== Career ==
Hippeau joined Ziff-Davis in 1989 as publisher of PC Magazine. He became president in 1991 and chairman and CEO in 1993. In 1995, SoftBank acquired Ziff-Davis, and Hippeau continued in the role of CEO until 2000, when the company was sold.

Hippeau joined SoftBank Capital in 2000 after leaving Ziff-Davis, Inc., where he was chairman and CEO. He was also a managing partner at SoftBank Capital.

Hippeau was President of SoftBank International Ventures, where he established SoftBank's international private equity funds and expanded them into Europe, Latin America and Asia. He was also SB Capital's board representative for its direct investments in companies, such as Yahoo!, GeoCities and CNET.

Hippeau was also responsible for founding ZDTV, a cable channel dedicated to technology and the Internet.

Hippeau was the CEO of HuffPost, which he joined in June 2009, after investing through SoftBank Capital and taking a board seat in 2006. Hippeau is a co-founder of NowThis News.

In 2011, Hippeau became a partner at Lerer Hippeau Ventures in New York City.

== Boards and committees ==
Hippeau serves on the boards of several public and private companies including Resorts Worldwide, BuddyMedia, and BuzzFeed. He served on Yahoo!'s board of directors. He is also on the investment committee for the SB Asia Infrastructure Fund.

== Personal life ==
Hippeau lives in New York City with his wife, Barbara; they have four children and two grandchildren.
