= Salary Transparent Street =

American digital media franchise

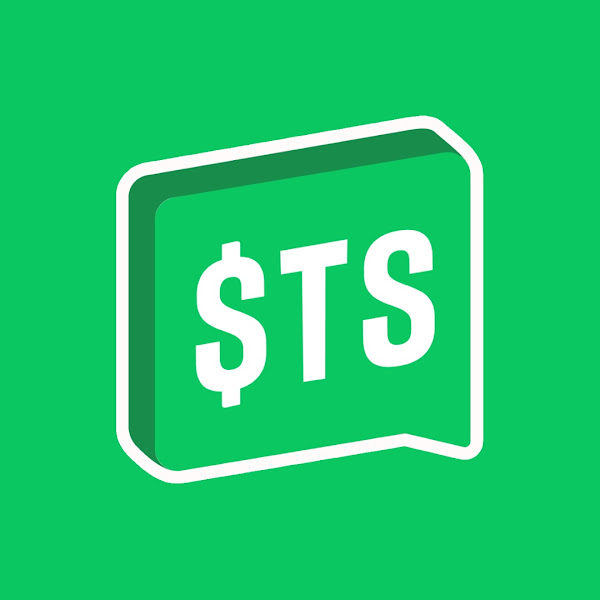

Salary Transparent Street is an American digital media franchise created by Hannah Williams in April 2022. The series features street interviews in which Williams asks strangers two questions: "What do you do?" and "How much do you make?" The franchise promotes pay transparency and advocates for closing wage gaps affecting women, people of color, workers with disabilities, and LGBTQ+ individuals.The franchise was acquired by NowThis in January 2026.

== Background ==
Williams, a Georgetown University graduate (class of 2019) and former data analyst, was inspired to create the series after discovering she was being underpaid at her job. After job-hopping through five positions in three years and increasing her salary from $40,000 to $115,000, Williams began posting about her career journey on TikTok in early 2022. The first Salary Transparent Street videos were filmed on the streets of Washington, D.C., and quickly went viral.

Williams and her husband and business partner, James Daniels, quit their six-figure jobs within months to focus on the venture full-time. Daniels serves as the company's videographer. The company generated over $458,000 in its first eight months of operation in 2022 and brought in just over $1 million in revenue in 2023, with 97% coming from brand partnerships with companies including Indeed, Capital One, and The Knot.

Prior to its acquisition by NowThis in 2026, Salary Transparent Street operated as a two-person team with Williams and Daniels handling all production and business operations.

== Content ==
The series maintains accounts on TikTok, Instagram, YouTube, Facebook, and LinkedIn. Each video follows a consistent format: Williams approaches strangers in cities across the United States and asks them to share their occupation and salary. Interviewees have included a wide range of professions and income levels. Williams also periodically turns the lens on herself, sharing her own business earnings and salary to maintain the transparency she advocates for.

== NowThis Acquisition ==
In January 2026, digital media company NowThis announced its acquisition of Salary Transparent Street. Williams indicated plans to revamp a previously shelved video podcast into an educational finance show and to expand the brand into long-form video, live events, and merchandise.

Williams cited the limitations of operating as a two-person team as a factor in the acquisition, stating that NowThis' resources and distribution expertise would help the franchise reach new audiences while maintaining its "authentic, people-first storytelling."

== Recognition ==
Williams was named to the Forbes 30 Under 30 list in 2024 and selected as a TIME100 Creator in 2025.

== Advocacy ==
Williams has testified before the Washington, D.C. Council in support of the D.C. Pay Range Act, which requires employers to list salary ranges on job postings. D.C. Mayor Muriel Bowser signed the wage transparency legislation in January 2024. In her testimony, Williams provided examples of how the videos had helped local workers, including a government contractor in Arlington, Virginia, whose colleague realized he was underpaid after watching a video and subsequently found a new job paying $25,000 more.
