= Thrillist =

American media company

- Website type: Private
- Founded: 2004; 22 years ago
- Headquarters: New York City, {{{location_country}}}
- Owners: Thrillist Media Group, Inc. (2004–2016); Group Nine Media, Inc. (2016–2022); Vox Media Inc. (2022–2026); PMX Global, LLC (since 2026)
- Founders: Ben Lerer; Adam Rich
- Key people: Meghan Kirsch (chief content officer); Helen Hollyman (editor-in-chief)
- Employees: 300+
- Parent: Vox Media, LLC
- Website: thrillist.com

Thrillist is an online media website covering travel. Thrillist was founded in 2004 by Ben Lerer and Adam Rich. In October 2016, Thrillist merged with internet brands The Dodo, NowThis, and Seeker to form the digital media holding company Group Nine Media, which was acquired by Vox Media in 2022. In June 2026, Penske Media Corporation, the largest shareholder of Vox Media, agreed to acquire a number of the company's brands, consolidating its existing publishing portfolio into a new subsidiary, PMX, which encompasses over 25 publications, and thereby strengthening its position as the largest digital media publisher. Thrillist covers national and international travel and experiences, spanning service guides and news, and, as of 2023, 18 cities across the United States.

== Description and history ==
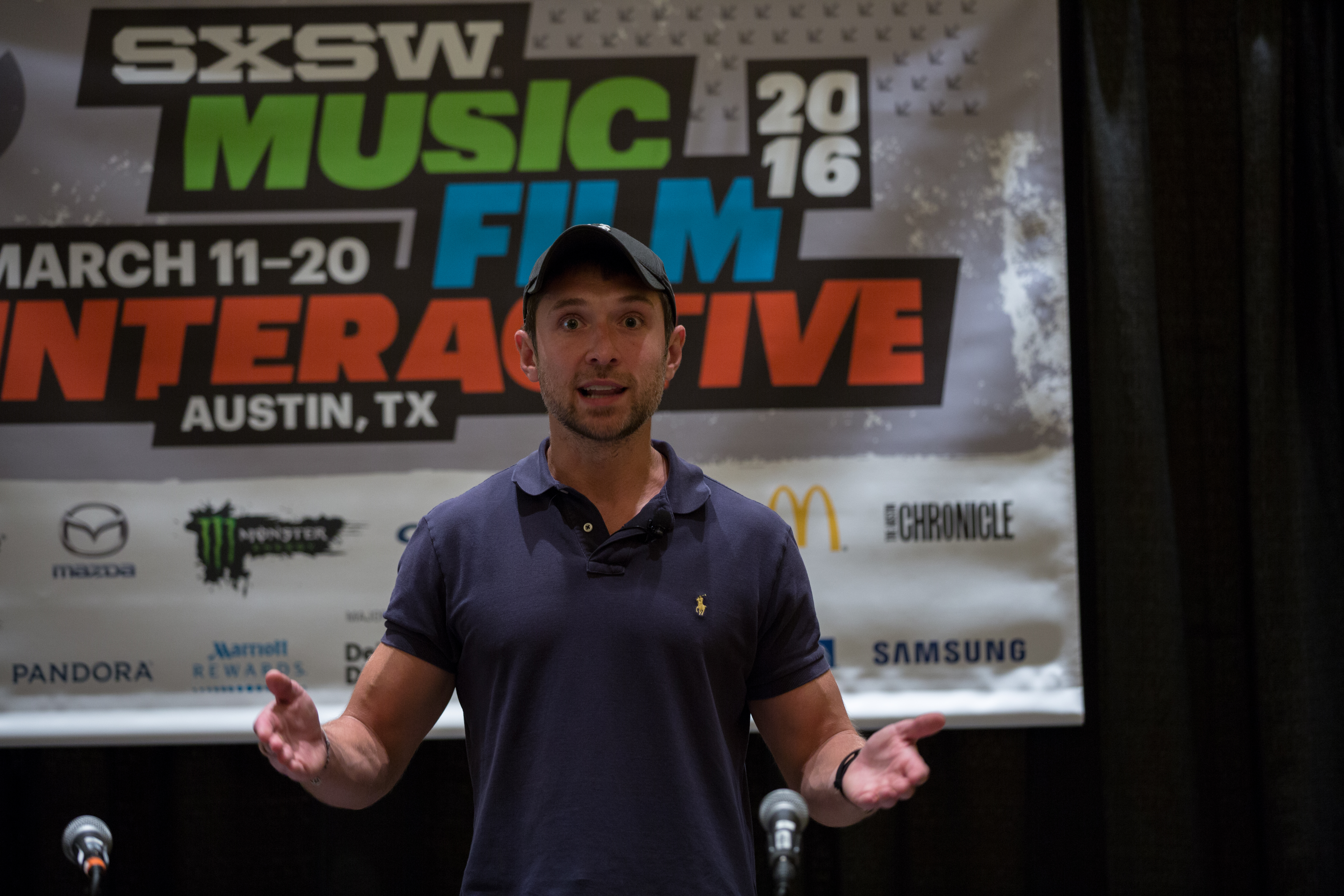
Founder Ben Lerer (2016)

Thrillist was founded in 2004 by Ben Lerer, son of media executive Kenneth Lerer; and Adam Rich, his friend from college. They graduated from the University of Pennsylvania in 2003 and moved to New York City. Rich initially was president, and Ben Robinson was the Chief Creative Officer. Lerer and Rich sent the first Thrillist email newsletter in 2005 to 600 friends.

In May 2010, Thrillist acquired online men's fashion retailer JackThreads.

In March 2011, TMG hired Eric Ashman as chief financial officer from The Huffington Post. In 2012, Ashman was charged with committing accounting fraud by the SEC while working as CFO at The Street and was "barred from acting as a director or officer of a public company for three years."

In February 2012, Lerer announced the creation of the Thrillist Media Group (TMG), which combined Thrillist, deal site Thrillist Rewards, and JackThreads. In August 2012, the media group led a $13 million fundraising round, from OAK, the Pilot Group, and Lerer Ventures.

In March 2013, TMG discontinued Thrillist Rewards, citing slow growth, and also launched The Crosby Press, a site designed to market JackThreads products by providing content aimed at a target audience of men in their late teens to early twenties. By May 2015, The Crosby Press had been closed by TMG. In October 2013, TMG launched the tech site Supercompressor, which focused on gear and gadgets for a young male audience. Supercompressor was discontinued as a site in September 2015.

In September 2015, TMG announced it raised $54 million in total from European publisher Axel Springer, Oak Investment Partners and SBNY. As part of the transaction, Thrillist separated its businesses, with Thrillist Media group operating the media site, Thrillist, while the e-commerce company operated JackThreads.

In October 2016, TMG merged with The Dodo, NowThis News and Seeker to form Group Nine Media. The newly formed holding company received a $100 million strategic investment from Discovery, Inc.

In February 2017, JackThreads laid off most of its staff in preparation to "cease operations as an independent company." A number of customers subsequently experienced problems with returns, canceled orders, and items that never shipped.

Following the layoffs of more than 25 employees, the Thrillist editorial, video, and distribution staffs announced plans to unionize with the Writers Guild of America East.

In July 2017, Thrillist hired entertainment industry veteran and former MTV and GoPro executive Ocean MacAdams to lead the digital brand.

In late September 2018, after more than a year at the bargaining table and a staff walkout, the Thrillist Union and management reached a collective bargaining agreement. The deal included a guaranteed 8.5% raise for all employees in its first year, as well as a salary floor of $50,000/year. "This represents a victory not just for the editorial employees of Thrillist, but for our entire industry," the Thrillist Union's bargaining committee said of the contract. "Through collective action we've made our workplace better and helped set a standard we hope other digital media shops can follow."

In 2022, Vox Media acquired Group Nine Media, bringing Thrillist into the Vox Media portfolio.

== Leadership and editorial staff ==
In 2019, Thrillist hired Meghan Kirsch, formerly Vice Media's senior vice president of marketing and creative, as its chief content officer. That same year, the media brand named Helen Hollyman, founding editor of Vice's Munchies, its new editor-in-chief.

After Group Nine Media's merger with Vox Media, Thrillist became a part of Vox Media's Lifestyle "pod," comprising Thrillist, Eater, POPSUGAR, and Punch. Later that year, Amanda Kludt, former editor-in-chief of Eater, was named group publisher of the Lifestyle sites.

In 2023, Lindsay Schrupp, formerly of VICE Media's Broadly, was named the Editor-in-Chief of Thrillist.

== Reception ==
Thrillist maintains a presence across several social media platforms, including Instagram, TikTok, Twitter, and Facebook, with a reported monthly digital reach of over 12 million users.

Thrillist is the recipient of four James Beard Foundation media awards.
