= Mechanical Arms =

Japanese anime series

- Key visual for the anime series

メカウデ (Mecha-Ude)
- Genre: Sci-Fi, Mecha, Action
- Created by: Sae Okamoto
- Original net animation
- Directed by: Sae Okamoto
- Written by: Hiroshi Matsuyama
- Music by: Narasaki
- Studio: TriF Studio
- Released: May 10, 2019
- Runtime: 25 minutes
- Manga
- Illustrated by: Yoshino Koyoka
- Published by: LY Corporation
- English publisher: Azuki (digitial); Scholastic (print)
- Magazine: Line Manga
- Original run: September 15, 2022 – August 29, 2024
- Volumes: 10
- Anime television series
- Directed by: Sae Okamoto
- Written by: Yasuhiro Nakanishi; TriF Studio
- Music by: Hiroyuki Sawano; Kohta Yamamoto; Daiki
- Studio: TriF Studio
- Licensed by: Crunchyroll (streaming); SEA: Plus Media Networks Asia
- Original network: Tokyo MX, TNC, BS Asahi, Kansai TV
- Original run: October 4, 2024 – December 20, 2024
- Episodes: 12
- icon

Mechanical Arms (Japanese: メカウデ, Hepburn: Mecha-Ude), also known as Mecha-Ude: Mechanical Arms (メカウデ MECHANICAL ARMS, Mecha-Ude Mekanikaru Āmu), is an original anime television series created and directed by Sae Okamoto. It was originally a Kickstarter-backed project launched by Okamoto in October 2016. The project met its goal and a 25-minute pilot was released on YouTube in May 2019. The series aired from October to December 2024.

== Summary ==
In the near future, unknown mechanical beings descend on Earth, randomly fusing with humans in order to survive. These beings are commonly called "Mecha-Ude", due to their resemblance to mechanized limbs and appendages. While most of them were harmless, some were often violent and would be used for nefarious purposes by equal-minded individuals, with the resistance group known as "ARMS" having to assess the situation before taking care of it themselves with their own Mecha-Ude.

Hikaru Amatsuga, an average middle-school student, ends up forced to cooperate with Alma, an extremely rare yet amnesiac Mecha-Ude bonded to his hoodie. Reluctantly tasked by ARMS into an all-out war to protect this strange Mecha-Ude from various factions seeking to claim Alma for its unparalleled power as the "Trigger Arm", Hikaru will have to fight his way with his new mechanical ally and several other Mecha-Ude users to prevent another faction known as the "Kagami Group" from reclaiming Alma for their plans against the Mecha-Ude and Earth itself.

== Characters ==
Hikaru Amatsuga
Voiced by: Toshiyuki Toyonaga (Japanese); Rayner Garranchan (English)
Alma
Voiced by: Tomokazu Sugita (Japanese); Phil Du Bois (English)
Aki Murasame
Voiced by: Yū Shimamura (Japanese); Reina Scully (English)
Shinisu and Dekisu
Voiced by: Kaito Ishikawa
Jun Kagami
Voiced by: Romi Park (Japanese); Christian Vandepas (English)
Fist
Voiced by: Yuichi Nakamura
Tohdoh
Voiced by: Amatsuki
Yoh Shirono
Voiced by: Eve
Aljis
Voiced by: Hiroki Tōchi
Fubuki
Voiced by: Aoi Yūki
Amaryllis
Voiced by: Yoko Hikasa
Yakumo
Voiced by: Kappei Yamaguchi

== Media ==
=== Anime ===
The anime began as a Kickstarter-backed project launched by Okamoto in October 2016. It ran until November 2016, when it reached its stretch goal of $60,000. A 25-minute pilot was produced and was released on YouTube with English subtitles on May 10, 2019. An English dub version was released on Reina Scully's YouTube channel the following day.

A full-fledged anime project was launched by Pony Canyon on September 15, 2022. It features the staff and cast returning to reprise their roles, produced by TriF Studio and directed by Okamoto, with scripts written by Yasuhiro Nakanishi, character designs by Terumi Nishi and Yoko Uchida (with mecha designs by Nurikabe), and music composed by Hiroyuki Sawano, Kohta Yamamoto, and AWSM's Daiki. While the first episode premiered at the 28th Fantasia International Film Festival on July 20, 2024, the series aired from October 3 to December 20, 2024, on Tokyo MX and other networks. (Note: Tokyo MX lists the series premiere on October 3, 2024, at 24:30, which is effectively October 4 at 12:30 a.m. JST.) The opening theme song is "VORTEX", while the ending theme song is "karma", both performed by Setsuko of Kuhaku Gokko.

Crunchyroll streamed the series under the title Mecha-Ude: Mechanical Arms. Plus Media Networks Asia licensed the series in Southeast Asia for simulcasting on Aniplus Asia.

==== Episodes ====
No.	Title	Written by	Storyboarded by	Original release date
1	"Mecha-Ude User"; Transliteration: "Mecha-Ude Tsukai" (Japanese: メカウデ使い)	Yasuhiro Nakanishi & TriF Studio	Sae Okamoto	October 4, 2024
2	"We Live in Completely Different Worlds"; Transliteration: "Ikiteru Sekai ga Chigai Sugi" (Japanese: 生きてる世界が違いすぎ)	Ayumu Hosaka & TriF Studio	Sae Okamoto	October 11, 2024
3	"It Was Your Will That Reached Out"; Transliteration: "Te o Nobashita no wa Kimi no Ishi" (Japanese: 手を伸ばしたのは君の意志)	Kazuyoshi Yamamoto & TriF Studio	Sae Okamoto	October 18, 2024
4	"It's Supposed to be Important"; Transliteration: "Daijina Koto no Hazunanoni" (Japanese: 大事な事のはずなのに)	Ayumu Hosaka & TriF Studio	Terumi Nishii	October 25, 2024
5	"Are You Hiding Something?"; Transliteration: "Nanka Kakushitenai?" (Japanese: なんか隠してない？)	Kazuyoshi Yamamoto & TriF Studio	Makoto Matsuo	November 1, 2024
6	"Friends Are, Um..."; Transliteration: "Tomodachi tte iu no wa Tsumari Sono…" (Japanese: 友達っていうのはつまりその…)	Yuuta Suzuki & TriF Studio	Saori Nakashiki	November 8, 2024
7	"You Just Met Me..."; Transliteration: "Watashi to Deatta Bakkari ni…" (Japanese: 私と出会ったばっかりに…)	TriF Studio	Sae Okamoto	November 15, 2024
8	"Your Legs Are Too Slow"; Transliteration: "Omae no Ashi ja Ososugiru" (Japanese: お前の脚じゃ遅過ぎる)	TriF Studio	Sae Okamoto	November 22, 2024
9	"You're Pretty Awesome!"; Transliteration: "Omae Saikyō Janē Ka!" (Japanese: お前最強じゃねえか！)	TriF Studio	Makoto Matsuo	November 29, 2024
10	"Remember, Brother"; Transliteration: "Omoidase, Otōtoyo" (Japanese: 思い出せ、弟よ)	TriF Studio & Tsutsumi Shinya	Sae Okamoto	December 6, 2024
11	"Don't Stop Here!"; Transliteration: "Konna Tokoro de Tomannayo!" (Japanese: こんな所で止まんなよ！)	TriF Studio & Tsutsumi Shinya	Sae Okamoto	December 13, 2024
12	"Even Then, We Continue Onward"; Transliteration: "Soredemo Mae ni Susumitsuzukeru" (Japanese: それでも前に進み続ける)	TriF Studio & Tsutsumi Shinya	Sae Okamoto	December 20, 2024

=== Manga ===
A manga adaptation illustrated by Yoshino Koyoka was serialized on the Line Manga website from September 15, 2022, to August 29, 2024. The manga was licensed by Azuki and serialized online thorough their website and app on July 2, 2023. On August 23, 2024, Scholastic announced that it would collaborate with Azuki to publish a physical edition in Spring 2025 under their Grafix imprint, with the first volume being released on April 15, 2025.
