= The Dodo (website) =

American media group and website

- Available in: English
- Creators: Kerry Lauerman, Izzie Lerer
- Parent: The Dodo.com, Inc. (2014–2016); Group Nine Media, Inc. (2016–2022); Vox Media, Inc. (2022–2026); PMX Global, LLC (since 2026)
- Website: www.thedodo.com
- Launched: January 2014; 12 years ago
- Current status: Active

The Dodo is an American online publisher focused on animals. The website was launched in 2014 by Izzie Lerer, the daughter of media executive Kenneth Lerer, and journalist Kerry Lauerman. The Dodo quickly became one of the most popular viral media publishers, thanks to its heavy focus on social media. It is headquartered in New York City.

The company—named after the first recorded species of animals that humans drove to extinction (Dodo)—was founded by Lerer out of "a personal passion for the subject manner". Lerer has a PhD in animal studies with a focus on animal ethics and human relationships from Columbia University, launching the website after noticing the viral success of animal videos online but seeing no one "really owned the space."

== History ==
The Dodo was launched in January 2014 by Izzie Lerer, the daughter of media executive Kenneth Lerer. Former Salon editor-in-chief Kerry Lauerman briefly served as CEO. Early investors included Discovery, Softbank, SBNY, Berggruen Holdings, Lerer Hippeau Ventures, Greycroft Partners and David Stern. Arianna Huffington was also listed as an advisor.

By November 2015, it had 30 employees, 15 million monthly unique visitors, and nearly 100 million monthly video views across social platforms, including Facebook and YouTube.

In October 2016, The Dodo, along with Thrillist, NowThis Media, and Seeker, combined to create a holding company called Group Nine Media. Lerer remained in charge of The Dodo, while her brother Ben, the founder of Thrillist, was named CEO of the combined company. In November, the brand garnered 1 billion monthly video views on social media. In December, it launched on Snapchat Discover.

In 2017, The Dodo's "Comeback Kids: Animal Edition" show amassed 130 million views on Facebook Watch, making it the most watched series on the platform.

The Dodo's editorial and video production staff unionized with the Writers Guild of America East in April 2018. In June, the brand partnered with Animal Planet to develop a show for linear TV. "Dodo Heroes" focuses on rescue animals and the humans who care for them.

In 2019, The Dodo launched its "You Know Me...Now Meet My Pet" series for IGTV as well as the Dodo Kids vertical and YouTube channel to focus on children's programming. In 2020, The Dodo released All the Feels for Quibi and Izzy's Koala World for Netflix.

In December 2021, it was announced that Vox Media would acquire Group Nine, including The Dodo. The deal was completed in February 2022.

In June 2026, it was announced that The Dodo, along with the remaining brands of Vox Media not sold to James Murdoch, would be sold to Penske Media Corporation.

== Other endeavors ==
The Dodo has branched out beyond social video programming over the years.

In 2019, The Dodo began working with Airbnb to create animal-based travel experiences based on the media brand's shows.

It expanded into pet insurance in the 2020s after Group Nine took a minority stake in Petplan. The company changed its name to Fetch by The Dodo to reflect its connection to the brand.
