= Kenneth Lerer =

American businessman

- Born: United States
- Occupations: Businessman, media executive
- Known for: Venture capital, HuffPost co-founder
- Spouse: Katherine Sailer
- Children: 2

Kenneth Lerer is an American businessman and a media executive. He was the chairman and co-founder of HuffPost, an American news website acquired by AOL in 2011. He is also a managing director of Lerer Hippeau, and chairman of Betaworks and BuzzFeed.

== Career ==
Lerer is a past executive vice president of AOL Time Warner and was a founding partner of corporate communications firm Robinson, Lerer, and Montgomery which is based in New York. In January 2010, Lerer and his son began a seed stage venture capital fund, Lerer Hippeau Ventures.

Lerer has taught at the Columbia University Graduate School of Journalism, the University of Pennsylvania, and New York University, where he lectured on the media and American corporations. He was Chairman of the Public Theater in New York for 10 years, and is now its Chairman Emeritus.

In June 2019, he announced he would step down as chairman of BuzzFeed after 10 years at the company.

== Personal life ==
Lerer is married to interior designer Katherine Sailer. He is Jewish.

Ken Lerer has two children. His son, Benjamin, started Thrillist, an online men's lifestyle website; Benjamin is also a managing director at Lerer Hippeau. His daughter, Izzie, is founder and CEO of The Dodo, a digital media company focused on animals. Ken Lerer is one of the minority owners of the New York Mets, holding a 4% stake in the baseball team.

== Politics ==
In 2013, Lerer launched StoptheNRA.com to advocate for the continuation of the assault weapons ban as a federal law. He later donated the website to the Brady Campaign to Prevent Gun Violence.
