= Seeker (media company) =

American digital media network and content publisher

- Industry: Digital media
- Founded: March 3, 2015; 11 years ago
- Headquarters: San Francisco, California, U.S.
- Key people: Caroline Smith (Chief Creative Officer); Ben Lerer
- Number of employees: 70 (2016)
- Parent: Vox Media (2022-present)
- Website: www.seeker.com

Seeker (stylized See<er) was an American digital media network and content publisher based in San Francisco, California. The network was established in 2015 within a former independent division of Discovery Communications known as Discovery Digital Networks. Seeker produced online video and editorial content for the digital media landscape, with an emphasis on social platforms and YouTube.

== History ==
Seeker was relaunched in May 2016 in an effort by Discovery Digital Networks to reach millennial audiences looking to satisfy their curiosity by immersing themselves in science, technology and culture. The network was initially launched in March 2015, with a focus on exploration and adventure.

In October 2016, Seeker was acquired by the newly founded Group Nine Media, along with Thrillist Media Group, NowThis News, The Dodo and SourceFed Studios. This new media group earned a $100 Million investment from Discovery Communications, and was under the leadership of former Thrillist CEO Ben Lerer. In February 2022, Group Nine Media was acquired by Vox Media, prompting Seeker's operations to be integrated into The Verge.

== Properties ==
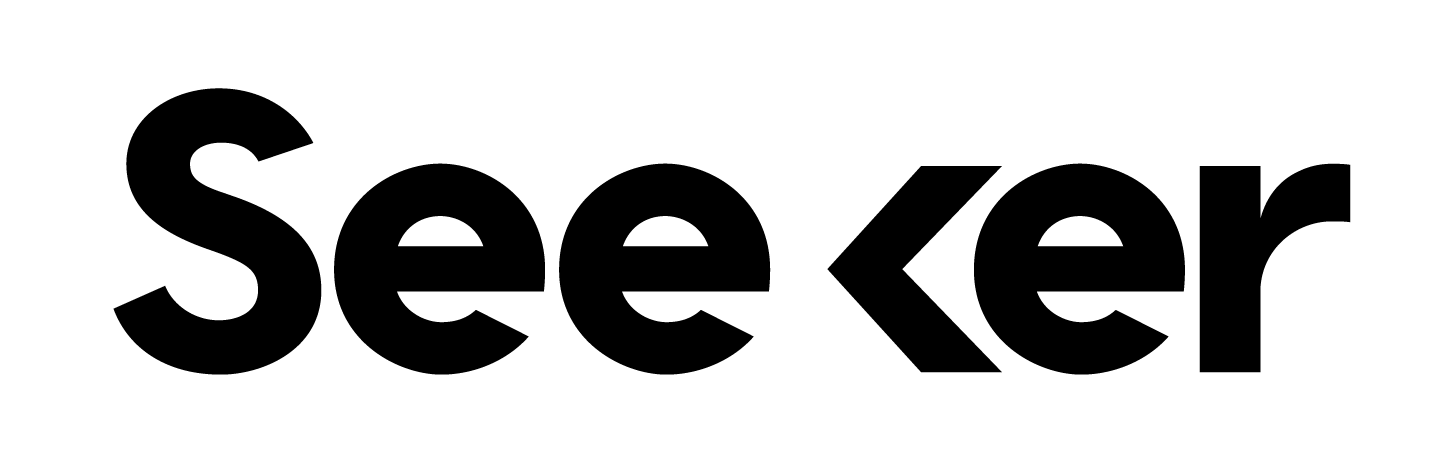
Logo from 2016 to 2021

Seeker's YouTube Channel (also called Seeker; formerly DNews) surpassed more than 4 million YouTube subscribers in August 2019.

In 2015, Seeker's program Rituals, with Laura Ling, was nominated for an Emmy. A Seeker Stories documentary co-produced with the ONE Campaign about energy poverty in Sub-Saharan Africa was honored with a Shorty Award in 2016. Seeker Daily, a short-form news show, partnered with YouTube to cover the 2016 Republican & Democratic Party national conventions in Cleveland and Philadelphia.

In 2016, Seeker began producing content for virtual reality headsets. Seeker VR content is also distributed on YouTube. and the DiscoveryVR app. Addison O'Dea was among the first to create original films for them, including explorations into the origins of voodoo in West Africa and explorations into the Sahara to find ancient Koranic libraries.

In May 2018, Seeker launched a new vertical, "Seeker Universe". The channel is dedicated to outer-space content and intended for a millennial audience.

In June 2018, Seeker partnered with Discovery to launch "The Swim", a multi-platform franchise following Ben Lecomte's 5,000-mile-long swim across the Pacific Ocean from Tokyo to San Francisco in an effort to gain awareness on the state of ocean health from pollution. His six-month journey was available to viewers across multiple platforms, a mid-form video series on Seeker's channels and Discovery GO, short-form social videos, weekly Instagram Stories, weekly TV Swim updates on Discovery channel, and the project culminates with a feature-length documentary later in 2019.

In April 2019, Seeker released its new YouTube series "SICK", which looks at how diseases work in the human body. Each episode covers a different disease and brings in researchers and doctors to explain them.

In July 2019, Seeker partnered with Discovery on a one-hour television special, Confessions from Space, in celebration of the 50th anniversary of the Apollo 11 Moon landing.

== Legacy properties ==
=== TestTube and DNews ===
On September 12, 2012, DNews launched on YouTube with three hosts: Trace Dominguez, Anthony Carboni, and Laci Green. On April 19, 2014, it was announced that Tara Long would be joining as a host. Three videos were uploaded every day. The show was rebranded to Seeker on March 1, 2017.

In May 2013, Discovery Digital Networks launched the TestTube network, which became the home of DNews, Laci Green's Sex+ Channel, and Blow it Up! hosted by Tory Belleci from MythBusters.

In March 2015, Discovery Digital Networks launched Seeker Network, which became the home of Seeker Daily, Seeker Stories, and several affiliate shows that centered around adventure and human interest stories.

On May 25, 2016, Discovery Digital Networks rolled out changes to its network lineup. The TestTube channel – which had since been renamed to TestTube News – rebranded to Seeker Daily, a show that previously ran on the primary Seeker channel. The overall format of the TestTube News was preserved, but the TestTube brand was phased out of existence.

On March 2, 2017, DNews' YouTube channel was rebranded to Seeker.

On March 17, 2017, the Seeker Daily channel was rebranded with a new format and new team as NowThis (part of Group Nine Media; along with Seeker).
