= Group Nine Media =

American digital media holding company

Group Nine Media, Inc.
- Type: Privately held company
- Predecessor: Discovery Digital Networks
- Founded: October 2016; 10 years ago
- Founder: Ben Lerer
- Defunct: February 22, 2022; 4 years ago
- Fate: Acquired by and folded into Vox Media
- Successor: Vox Media
- Headquarters: New York City, U.S.
- Key people: Ben Lerer (CEO); Brian Sugar (President)
- Number of employees: 415+ (2016)
- Subsidiaries: The Dodo; JASH; NowThis; PopSugar; Seeker; Thrillist
- Website: www.groupninemedia.com

Group Nine Media was an American digital media holding company based in New York City. The company comprises Thrillist, NowThis, The Dodo, and Seeker. The four brands, and former brand SourceFed, merged to form Group Nine Media in October 2016. In October 2019, Group Nine Media acquired PopSugar. In December 2020, Group Nine formed its own corporate SPAC to use the public funding for the purpose of effecting a merger, capital stock exchange, asset acquisition, stock purchase, reorganization or similar business combination. In December 2021, Vox Media announced its intention to acquire Group Nine. The transaction was completed in February 2022, and Group Nine was folded into Vox Media.

== Ownership ==
At the time of the 2016 merger, Discovery Communications announced a $100 million minority investment in the collective organization, becoming the biggest shareholder before Axel Springer. Discovery also acquired the right to obtain a majority stake later if it so chooses. In 2017, Discovery led a $40 million funding round in the "digital media company. Group Nine Media raised $50 million in new funding in 2019, led by its lead investor Discovery along with participation from German publishing firm Axel Springer.

Ben Lerer, founder of Thrillist and managing director of Lerer Hippeau Ventures, is CEO of Group Nine Media.

On 13 December 2021, it was announced that Vox Media would acquire Group Nine Media. The acquisition was completed on 22 February 2022.
