= Meg Turney =

American adult model, internet personality, and cosplayer (born 1987)

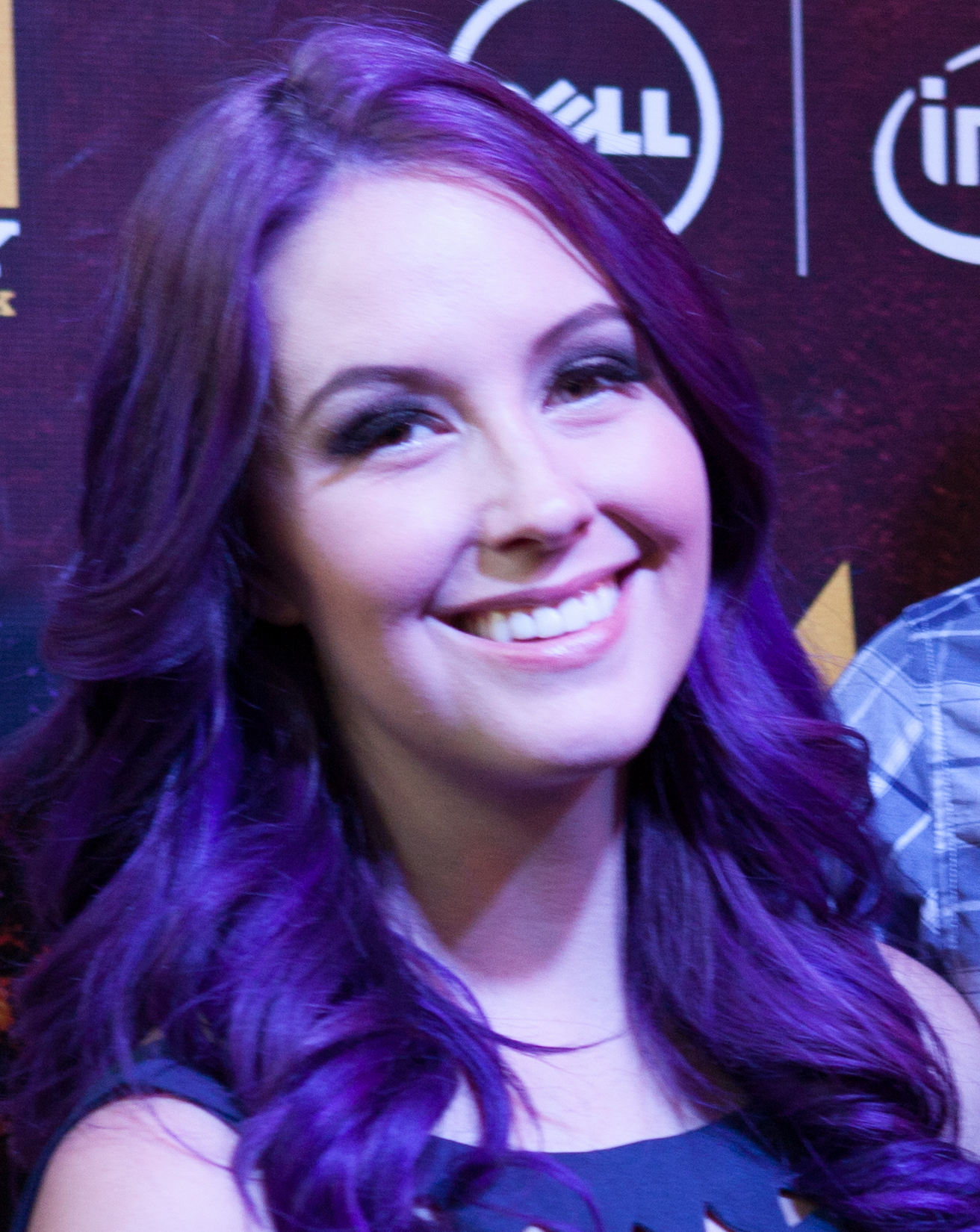
- Turney at the 2015 Fantastic Fest
- Born: Megan LeeAnn Turney; March 12, 1987 (age 39); Austin, Texas, U.S.
- Occupations: Streamer; Internet personality; cosplayer; model; vlogger
- Spouse: Gavin Free (m. 2024)

Twitch information
- Channel: MegTurney
- Followers: 117 thousand

YouTube information
- Channel: M T
- Years active: 2012–present
- Genres: Vlog; gaming
- Subscribers: 282 thousand
- Views: 27.9 million
- Last updated: April 4, 2026

Megan LeeAnn Turney (born March 12, 1987) is an American cosplayer, YouTuber, Twitch streamer, and model. Regarding the latter, she often models in glamour or cosplay shoots, and maintains an OnlyFans account. She became an internet personality through her hosting work, formerly with SourceFed, as well as Rooster Teeth's The Know. She also maintains a personal YouTube channel where she posts vlogs and Let's Play videos and live streams.

== Cosplay modeling ==
Through a friend's invitation to Ushicon 1, Turney was introduced to cosplaying and anime conventions in 2002. Turney's first cosplay was of Sailor Heavy Metal Papillon from the anime, Sailor Moon. On her first cosplay, Turney recalled, "I failed terribly. I couldn’t make half the costume, it was incredibly difficult, but I was as happy as a clam." Since then, Turney became recognized for her cosplaying and was able to generate a following large enough to turn cosplaying into her full-time career. The Vancouver Sun wrote that "Turney is an internet mainstay. She has her own YouTube channel and her Patreon fan site is an earner." When she began to receive cover in online publications, Turney's Faye Valentine, Princess Leia, and Psycho cosplays were particularly recognized. Turney's notability as a cosplayer led her to appear on the Syfy series Heroes of Cosplay and a commercial for Guild Wars 2. She hosted a cosplay contest in 2013 at SXSW. Turney was also a special guest at the 2016 edition of Fan Expo Vancouver.

Her cosplaying has been noted by various media publications to be racy and erotic. Turney's online content majorly includes images of her cosplaying and modeling, with Inquisitr writing that "she has a tendency to upload photos that push the boundaries of Instagram's community guidelines regarding nudity." On sexuality in cosplay, Turney has stated, "I think there is an element of sexuality for cosplay and for some people there is no sexuality whatsoever. I think it is all about how you approach it. I think that is true of any community really." Turney also maintains that there is more work involved in her cosplaying than showing off her body, such as costume designing, and stated "I think some people just go, 'She [fellow cosplayer Jessica Nigri] has boobs, that's why she's popular.' But that's not really the case." In January 2015, Playboy ranked Turney at number 10 on its "25 Hottest YouTube Stars" listing. In April 2015, FHM placed Turney at number 20 on its annual "100 Sexiest Women in the World" list.

Having worked with various photographers, Turney also has experience modeling outside of cosplay. In June 2015, Playboy conducted a photoshoot with Turney.

One of her cosplays was of her boyfriend Gavin's character from Rooster Teeth's show X-Ray and Vav, with Ashley Jenkins joining her as X-Ray at RTX 2014. Ray and Gavin themselves had attended the Achievement Hunter panel of the previous year's RTX in costume as the duo, which had originally started out as an intro flub on Gavin's part for a Halo 4 achievement guide.

Gallery

Meg Turney's cosplay
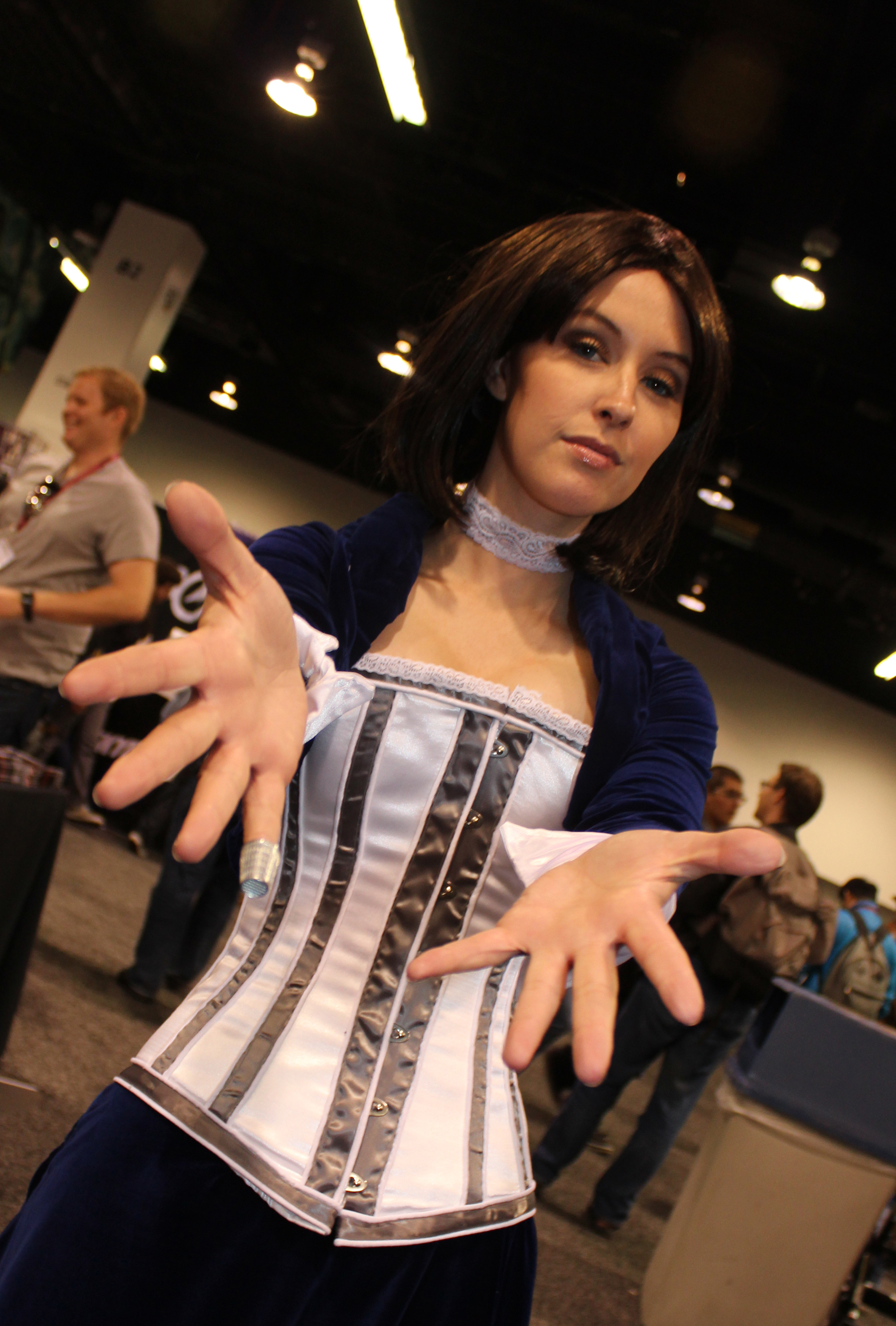
Cosplay of Elizabeth from BioShock Infinite

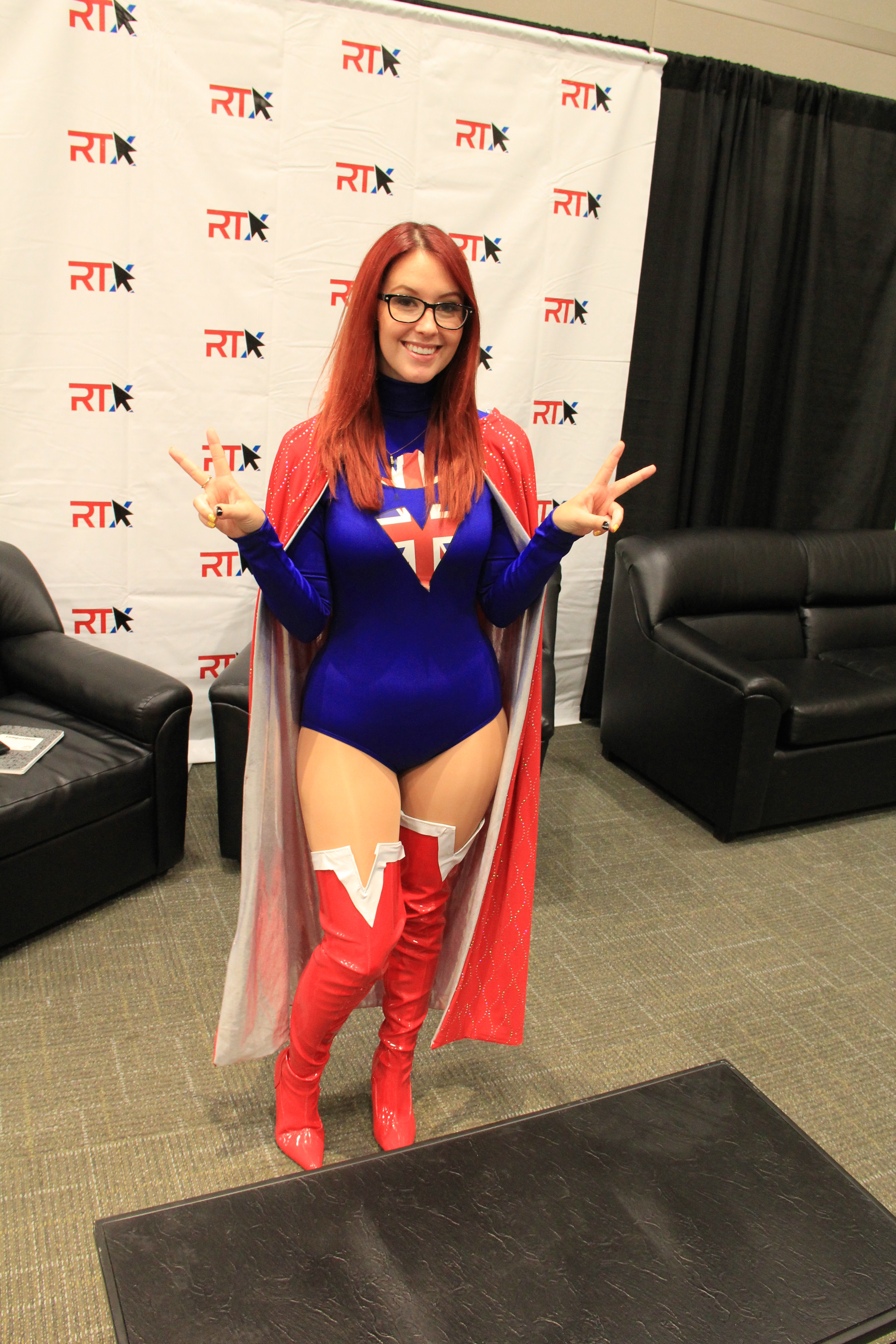
Cosplay of Vav from X-Ray and Vav

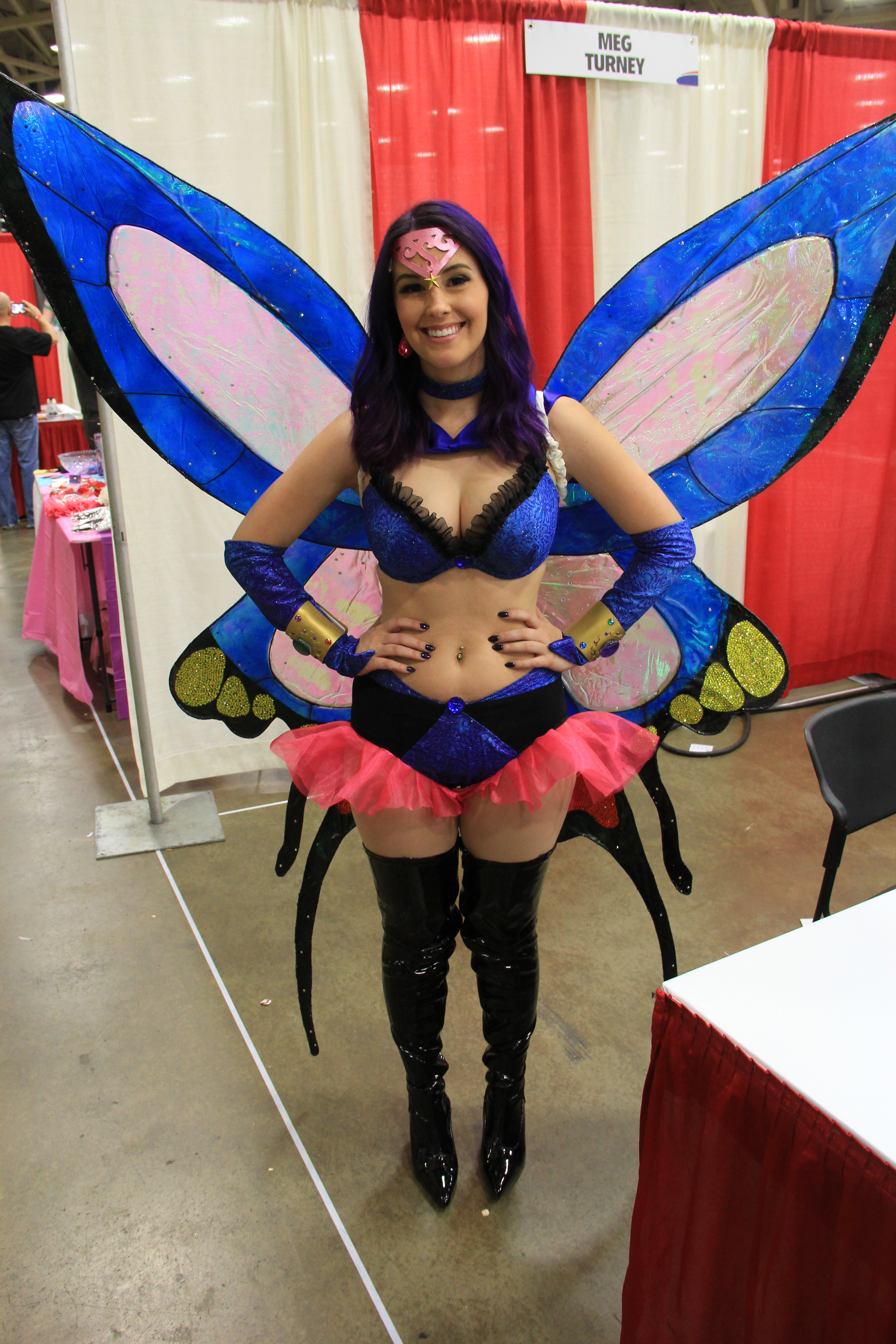
Cosplay of Sailor Heavy Metal Papillon from Sailor Moon

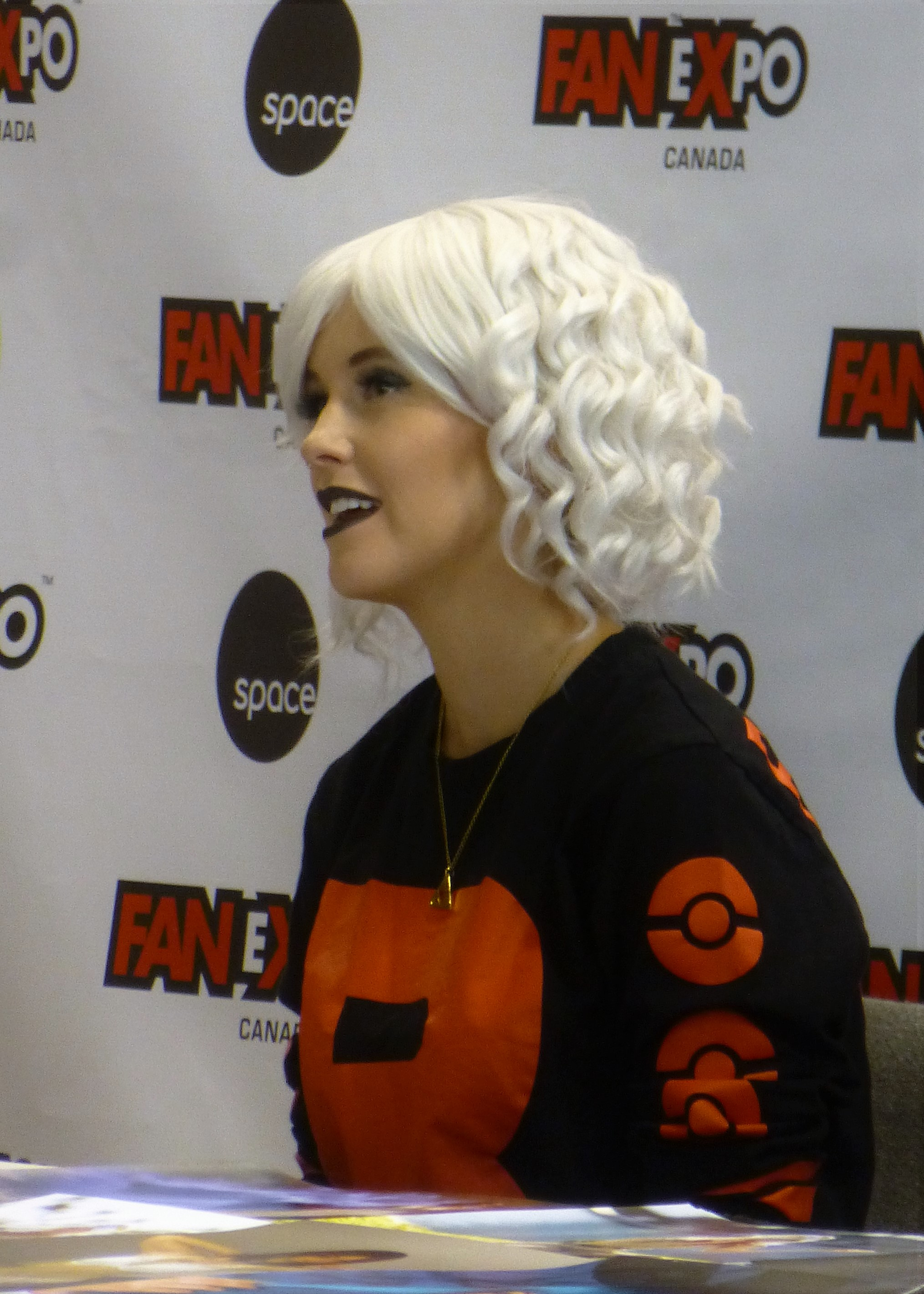
Cosplay of a member of Team Rocket from Pokémon
Photos taken at (from left to right): WonderCon 2013, RTX 2014, Fan Expo Dallas 2015, and Fan Expo Canada 2016

== Online media career ==
=== Career beginnings and SourceFed (2012–2014) ===
Turney registered her YouTube channel in November 2009 but began posting vlogs in 2012. During the early years of her online media career, Turney hosted event coverage for deviantART and appeared as a featured host on CraveOnline's TechKnow show. In July 2012, Turney would break through as an online media host, making her debut appearance on SourceFed, alongside Steve Zaragoza, in which the two discussed Star Wars, Comic-Con, and cosplaying. Later that year Turney was alongside Elliott Morgan and Philip DeFranco during SourceFed's videos for YouTube's "Election Hub." In February 2013, Turney and her SourceFed co-hosts won an Audience Choice Streamy Award for Series of the Year. Along with being a co-host of the channel, Turney was also a writer for the SourceFed website. Turney would remain a host of the channel, as well as its Nerd spinoff, until April 2014, when she announced she would be leaving SourceFed.

During her time with SourceFed, Turney appeared as a host of other series including the AMA's On Demand, as well as Nerdist News. Additionally, in August 2013, Turney discussed Hollywood portrayals about life on Mars, alongside Bobak Ferdowsi, Matt Mira, and Kevin Lieber.

=== Work with Rooster Teeth (2014–2016) ===
After departing from SourceFed, Turney was announced as a new host for Rooster Teeth's news channel, The Know, on May 30, 2014. On joining Rooster Teeth, Turney claimed, "They have been pioneers in the industry for many years, and their level of originality and just plain fun in their content is unmatched in the space." On June 1, 2014, Turney made her first appearance on The Know. In July 2014, Rooster Teeth distributed the music video for "Did I Say That Out Loud?" by Barenaked Ladies, in which Turney portrays the exasperated girlfriend of Gavin Free's character. In August 2014, Turney began co-hosting The Know It All: Leaderboard, a collaborative series between Rooster Teeth and The Daily Dot. Turney also voiced Neon Katt in the animated series RWBY, and was a regular host on The Patch, Rooster Teeth's weekly gaming podcast. On June 27, 2016, Turney announced that she had left Rooster Teeth on good terms.

=== Twitch streaming and gaming (2016–present) ===
In October 2014, Turney was involved in a controversy when live streaming video website Twitch updated its rules of conduct telling users to not shoot videos in "lingerie, swimsuits, pasties, and undergarments". Some news websites reported that Turney was the first user banned for violating the updated rules of conduct. Turney clarified on Twitter, stating, "Dear everyone writing articles saying I was banned from Twitch, I wasn't. I've never been banned. I was told to change my picture," adding "while we're on the subject I've never done any 'sexy broadcasts'. I've never even streamed from that account." Additionally, Turney also provided her opinion that the rule was not unfair to women, but just unfair in general, stating, "If someone has a big push-up bra and a low-cut shirt while they play [League of Legends] or a guy streams shirtless, who cares?"

In June 2016, Turney began streaming on Twitch. In the years since leaving SourceFed and Rooster Teeth, Turney has continued to upload video game commentaries and streams, as well as cosplay-related vlogs on her personal YouTube channel.

In April 2019, Turney signed with talent agency Abrams Artists, joining its gaming roster. In June 2020, Turney moved from Abrams to TalentX Gaming, where she is currently represented. In October, she participated in a Dead by Daylight tournament hosted by Twitch Rivals. She streamed a variety of other games and marked five years of her Twitch partnership in June 2021. Turney's YouTube channel also became primarily used as a selection of highlights from her Twitch streams.

=== OnlyFans (2020–present) ===
In March 2020, Turney created an OnlyFans account to supplement her Patreon account. At the time, Patreon was her primary venue for releasing her modeling work while OnlyFans was there primarily to share older photosets that were no longer available on Patreon, but in October 2020, Turney announced on her Twitter that she was moving all of her content to OnlyFans and that the site would be her new primary content hub. After releasing her book of topless photos on her personal website, she began creating boudoir content full time on her OnlyFans. Turney still releases cosplay photosets on her OnlyFans, but most of her content is boudoir photography.

== Personal life ==
Turney has openly spoken about her bisexuality with her audience. In a video interview with the YouTube channel VlogBrothers, she further discussed being bisexual, and spoke about how she was teased for her sexual orientation. At VidCon 2013, Turney spoke during the convention's "Being LGBT on YouTube" panel.

She has been in a relationship with Gavin Free since 2013. In September 2024, she announced the two were married.

=== Home invasion ===
On January 26, 2018, a man armed with a handgun broke into Turney's and Free's home, breaking a window to enter and firing one round as he did. Turney and Free hid in a closet and called police. When the man could not find the couple, he left but was confronted by police outside. The suspect fired one shot and police returned fire; when officers approached the suspect's vehicle, they found him dead. Turney and Free were physically unharmed during the incident. It has been assessed the suspect was a fan who had developed an obsession with Turney and Free, and he was attempting to cause harm to Free, against whom he felt resentment. Turney ceased updating her YouTube channel for nearly half a year following the incident, citing concern for her safety in sharing her life with an audience.

== Filmography ==
=== Web series ===
Year	Title	Role	Notes
2014	Under the Table	Herself	
2014	Ten Little Roosters	Herself	Episode: "And Then There Were Nine"
2014–2016	The Know	Herself, co-host	
2014–2016	On the Spot	Herself, contestant	
2015	X-Ray and Vav	Woman	Voice, episode: "The Dawn of Mogar"
2015	Immersion	Meg the Raider	Episode: "Fallout 4 in Real Life"
2015	Buff Buddies	Herself	
2015-Present	RWBY	Neon Katt	Voice, 4 episodes
2015–2016	Free Play	Herself, co-host	
2016	Crunch Time	Ava Fontaine	2 episodes
2017	Sugar Pine 7	Meg	

=== Film ===
Year	Title	Role	Notes
2015	Lazer Team	Ruby Lakes cheerleader	Uncredited cameo

=== Music video ===
Year	Title	Artist	Role
2014	"Dumb for You"	Hoodie Allen	Girl In Car
2014	"Did I Say That Out Loud?"	Barenaked Ladies	Love Interest
