= SoftBank Capital =

American venture capital company

- Company type: Limited liability company
- Industry: Venture capital
- Founded: 1995
- Headquarters: Newton, Massachusetts, United States
- Products: Investments
- Parent: Softbank Holdings
- Website: www.softbank.com

SoftBank Capital is a venture capital group in the United States, focusing on technology and telecom early stage businesses. It was founded by SoftBank. Since 2015 it does not actively make investments, but it continues to oversee its prior portfolio.

== History ==
The investment branch of the Japanese telecom company, SoftBank Corp.

SoftBank Capital was established in 1995 and initially led by four partners: Ron Fisher, Eric Hippeau, Steve Murray, and Michael Perlis.

The company is a member of National Venture Capital Association.

In November 2011, Mike Perlis stepped down as general partner at SoftBank Capital to become CEO of Forbes Media.

In 2013, it created a $250 million growth fund for companies such as Alibaba and MediaTek.

SoftBank Capital was closed by SoftBank in 2015. Although not making active investments, as of late 2017 it continued to oversee its prior portfolio.

== See also ==
- List of venture capital firms
- Private equity in the 2000s
