= Discovery Digital Networks =

American media organization

- Company type: Subsidiary
- Industry: Technology
- Founded: June 5, 2013; 13 years ago San Francisco, California, U.S.
- Defunct: December 2016; 9 years ago
- Successor: Group Nine Media
- Headquarters: San Francisco, California, U.S.
- Key people: Jim Louderback (Former CEO); Philip DeFranco (Senior Vice President)
- Number of employees: 75
- Parent: Discovery Communications
- Website: www.discoverydn.com

Discovery Digital Networks was a San Francisco based multi-channel Internet television and digital cable network that created, produced and distributed streaming television shows on niche topics. It was sold by Discovery Communications into Group Nine Media in December 2016 and, as such, no longer exists.

Discovery Digital Networks operated the online video arm of Discovery Communications from its acquisition in May 2012 until the sale to Group Nine Media. It operated as the provider for six distinct "networks:" Revision3, TestTube, Animalist, Seeker, the DeFranco Network and Rev3Games.

== History ==
On May 3, 2012, Discovery Communications announced that it had entered into an agreement to acquire Revision3. The transaction closed on June 1, 2012. On December 5, 2012, Discovery launched DNews, with current stories about science and technology drawn from the Discovery website Discovery News.

On May 23, 2013, Discovery launched a sister site to itself called TestTube. It separates documentary-type shows from the main site, including the long-running Scam School, to better market to the existing Discovery Channel audience. On May 30, 2013, Discovery acquired the company set up by Philip DeFranco, DeFranco Creative. A new subsidiary was formed under Revision3 called Phil DeFranco Networks and Merchandise, which he will now completely operate under as Senior VP.

On October 4, 2013, Discovery launched an animal-based sister-site called Animalist. It produces original shows about animals, aimed at viewers of Discovery's Animal Planet.

=== Production and distribution ===
Many of the shows are produced and owned by Discovery Digital Networks however some of DDN's shows are produced independently. DDN handles the distribution and marketing aspects of these external shows, but does not produce the content. In February 2008 DDN completed work on its own studio where their own shows are recorded.

The shows have been distributed through a wide range of platforms and distribution partners, including Virgin America's in-flight entertainment system, CNET TV, iTunes, Discovery.com, BitTorrent, YouTube, PyroTV, Miro, TiVo, Zune, Apple devices, Android and Xbox. The shows have also been distributed in wide variety of formats, including QuickTime, Windows Media Video, Theora, WebM and Xvid. An embeddable Flash/HTML5 player is also available. In September 2011, Revision3 programming began to air on cable television on the rebranded YouToo TV, the former American Life Network, which ended after the sale to Discovery Communications. In September 2012, DDN partnered with YouTube to create TechFeed, an original channel about technology made by DDN, featuring existing hosts. In March 2013, the company launched an official DDN Xbox 360 app for Xbox Live Gold members.

== Networks ==
=== Revision3 ===
Revision3 is the consumer review and miscellaneous network launched in 2005, as well as being the company name from 2005 to 2013. The network has primarily technology-based shows hosted and produced by Patrick Norton, and gaming shows hosted and produced by Adam Sessler. The network is known for creating personalities which consumers can trust buying advice from. The network also creates and hosts comedic, political, DIY and movie-related content. The name refers to the revisioning of video programming, according to founders Jay Adelson, Kevin Rose and David Prager. The first revision was cable television, adding general interest channels, catering to the “most common denominator”. The second revision was PC-based Internet video, independent films, no business model, no loyalty, no audience. The third revision or Revision3 is TV and Internet converged. iPods, TiVo, mobile, broadband enable mass, loyal audience to shift to on-demand, niche content.

=== DeFranco Networks ===
In 2013, DDN acquired the company set up by Philip DeFranco, DeFranco Creative. A new subsidiary was formed under DDN called DeFranco Networks and Merchandise, which he will now completely operate under as Senior VP. This set up 2 individual subsidiaries of under DeFranco Networks: SourceFed, a daily pop-culture news and comedy show, and For Human Peoples, DeFranco's storefront turned feel-good channel with unique content. These networks are all hosted under DDN.

=== TestTube ===
TestTube is the education and documentary network launched in 2013. The network was created to appeal to fans of Discovery Channel properties, even including their own talent and formats. It is most well known for its short science-based shows such as DNews, based on the Discovery News website, How Stuff Works content and Hard Science, the experimental education show. The network also produces documentary and inspirational content.

=== Animalist ===
Animalist is an animal-based network that launched in late 2013. The network handles shows for famous animals such as Lil Bub, produces educational shows on animals and also produces helpful content for pet owners. It closely mirrors programming formats on Discovery's Animal Planet. Their daily show, Animalist News, is hosted by Amberly Gochoel, Catie Wayne, and Alex Farnham.

=== Rev3Games ===
Rev3Games is a Revision3 streaming television channel with shows about video games. The channel launched on March 13, 2012. Adam Sessler was the editor-in-chief and executive producer of Rev3Games until April 2014.

=== Seeker ===
Seeker is a digital network dedicated to the spirit of adventure and pursuit of wonder. It has a channel called Seeker Daily that uploads a new video every day, 5 days a week, about information related to our world. The network launched on March 3, 2014.

== See also ==
- Digg
- TechTV
- TWiT.tv
- Multi Channel Network
- List of YouTube personalities
