= NowThis =

American progressive news media website

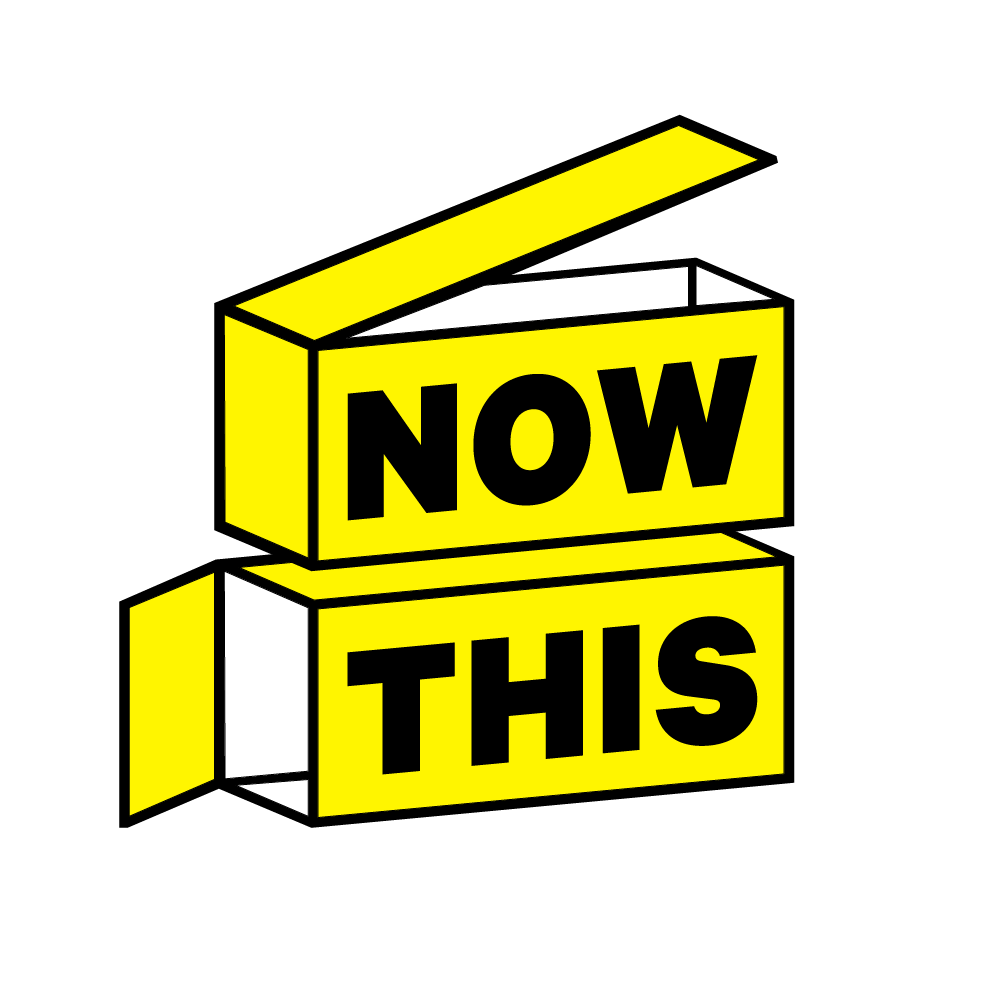
- Founded: September 2012; 14 years ago
- Founders: Kenneth Lerer; Eric Hippeau; Brian Bedol; Fred Harman
- Headquarters: New York City, New York, U.S.
- Key people: Sharon Mussalli (CEO)
- Parent: Group Nine Media (2016–2022); Vox Media (2022–2023); Accelerate Change (2023–2024); NowMedia Networks (2024-present)
- Subsidiaries: NowThis Impact; Salary Transparent Street
- Website: NowMedia Network

NowThis Media is an American progressive social media-focused media organization founded in 2012. The company specializes in creating short-form videos. Their target audience are Gen Z and millennials.

== History ==
NowThis was founded by HuffPost co-founder and former chairman Kenneth Lerer and former Huffington Post CEO Eric Hippeau in September 2012. NowThis originally focused exclusively on social-media platforms, such as Facebook, having announced in 2015 that it would not have a homepage. By 2018, it had changed this position.

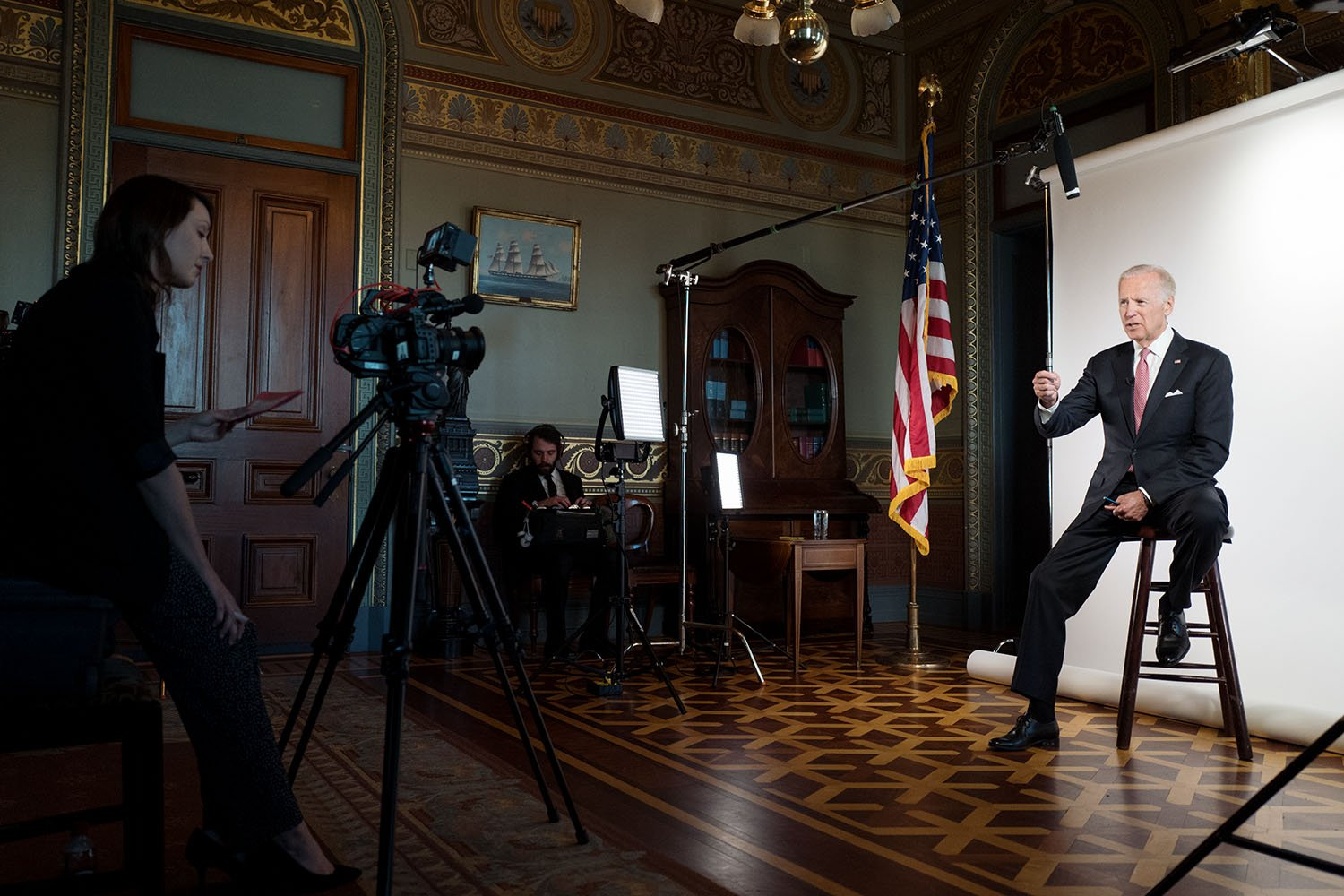
Behind the scenes of Joe Biden being interviewed on NowThis in 2016

On December 8, 2015, NowThis raised $16.2m in Series D funding. By this time, the company said that 68% of its audience were millennials between the ages of 18 and 34. It was announced that this funding would be used to launch more focused channels. Between 2012 and 2014, the editor-in-chief was Edward O'Keefe, who previously was the executive producer at ABC News Digital. As of 2013, NowThis produced about 50 segments per day and received about 15–20 million views per month.

In 2016, NowThis joined with The Dodo, Thrillist, and Seeker to form Group Nine Media, which was acquired by Vox Media in February 2022.

In April 2023, it was announced that NowThis would be spun off as a separate company from Vox Media. The deal was backed by Accelerate Change, a nonprofit dedicated to increasing civic engagement among underrepresented groups. In December of the same year, Sharon Mussalli was appointed as the first female CEO of the company. In March 2024, Adweek reported on the creation of NowMedia Networks, an identity driven media network reaching 190 million people that is the combination of publishers NowThis, PushBlack, Pulso, ParentsTogether, Feminist, and PlusMas.

In February 2024, it was announced that NowThis had laid off roughly 50% of its workforce. The organization said that the staff layoffs were part of a “broader initiative to realign our resources and structure to ensure a long-term sustainable business in the evolving media landscape.” A second round of layoffs followed in November 2024, predominantly affecting unionized employees.

In September 5, 2024, NowThis hired Michael Vito Valentino as Editor-In-Chief. He will oversee all creative, development, and talent across the NowThis portfolio, to attract young audiences to the platform.

In October 2024, NowThis announced their inaugural Advisory Board. The Advisory Board is made up of business leaders in occupations that relate to GenZ, in an effort to better understand and connect with a Gen Z audience.

In 2024, NowThis more than doubled its revenues and achieved profitability for the first time as an independent company.

== Content ==
NowThis pioneered "social video"—found footage recut for maximum shareability on social media, often featuring text-on-screen captions. The company's breakthrough came with "audio agnostic content"—subtitled videos that viewers could watch without headphones. According to a Nielsen study commissioned by NowThis, the company's videos reach 70 percent of all Americans in their twenties every month.

=== Are You Okay? ===
Are You Okay? is a digital comedy interview series launched in 2024, hosted by Brianna "Bri" Morales. The series features a mix of celebrity interviews and man-on-the-street-style content, with guests including Lizzo, Julia Louis-Dreyfus, Nick Jonas, and Joe Jonas. The show was created under Editor-in-Chief Michael Vito Valentino as part of NowThis's rebrand toward Gen Z-focused original programming. In 2025, the franchise expanded with Are You Okay? Live!, a touring live show with performances at venues including the Laugh Factory in Chicago and Los Angeles. As of 2026, the show's TikTok account has over 568,000 followers and 35.7 million likes.

=== Salary Transparent Street ===
In January 2026, NowThis acquired Salary Transparent Street, a viral social media franchise created by Hannah Williams in 2022. The series features street interviews in which Williams asks strangers about their occupations and salaries to promote pay transparency and close wage gaps. Williams, a former data analyst and Forbes 30 Under 30 honoree, created the series after discovering she was being underpaid at her job. Prior to the acquisition, Salary Transparent Street operated as a two-person team run by Williams and her husband James Daniels, generating over $1 million in revenue in 2023 primarily through brand partnerships. CEO Sharon Mussalli stated that the company plans to scale the franchise across NowThis' 92-million-follower network and expand into long-form video, live events, and merchandise.

=== NowThis Impact ===
NowThis Impact, formerly known as NowThis Politics, is the company's issue-driven brand focusing on politics, policy, civil rights, and social justice. The brand produces socially-conscious news content designed to educate audiences on issues that matter to them, distinguishing it from NowThis's entertainment-focused programming.

NowThis's political coverage gained national prominence during the 2016 election cycle. In September 2015, the company conducted what it described as the first-ever cross-platform interview of a presidential candidate with Bernie Sanders, tailoring content for Facebook, Tumblr, Snapchat, Twitter, Vine, and Instagram, garnering 15 million views in 10 days. During the 2016 presidential campaign, NowThis interviewed President Barack Obama and Vice President Joe Biden; an Obama interview released days before the election, in which he criticized FBI Director James Comey's handling of the Hillary Clinton email investigation, generated widespread news coverage. In 2018, a NowThis video of Texas Senate candidate Beto O'Rourke defending NFL players who knelt during the national anthem went viral, elevating O'Rourke to national prominence. Representative Alexandria Ocasio-Cortez sat down for an interview with NowThis weeks before her 2018 upset primary victory.

NowThis's content is targeted at left-leaning Millennials and GenZ. NowThis has more than 8.5m followers for its news and politics accounts, ranked as the top news publisher in the United States in 2022 by the Reuters Institute. An analysis from BuzzFeed News found that NowThis was the most popular left-leaning site on Facebook between 2015 and 2017; along with Occupy Democrats, it accounted for half of the 50 top posts on Facebook. According to the Reuters Institute for the Study of Journalism NowThis' videos are primarily emotion-driven in order to generate views and shares and the group has been accused of making partisan content.

== Business ==
According to CEO Sharon Mussalli, the company generated $20 million in revenue and an adjusted profit of $4.6 million. Mussalli credited the 2024 U.S. presidential election and a new editorial strategy for the momentum.

NowThis generates revenue through three streams: producing branded content, selling advertising, and licensing deals for its content. As of 2019, the company posted approximately 20 videos per day on its main Facebook page and attracted around 2.5 billion views monthly across all platforms.

== Awards and recognition ==
In 2018, NowThis won an Edward R. Murrow Award for Excellence in Video for its coverage of Hurricane Maria and its aftermath in Puerto Rico. That same year, the company received a Silver Cannes Lion for Content Marketing - Social Video for its "Unframed" campaign with Samsung Gear 360.

In 2019, NowThis won a Shorty Social Good Award in the Racial Equality category for "NowThis Reports: School Inequality in the Deep South," an investigative report on school segregation in Catahoula Parish, Louisiana.

In 2020, NowThis received a Webby People's Voice Award for Social News & Politics for its "20 Questions for 2020" interview series with presidential candidates.

In 2020, NowThis served as a production company on Two Distant Strangers, a short film written by Travon Free and directed by Free and Martin Desmond Roe. The film, which examines the deaths of Black Americans during encounters with police through the story of a man trapped in a time loop, won the Academy Award for Best Live Action Short Film at the 93rd Academy Awards in April 2021.

In 2023, NowThis won a Webby Award in the Social Events & Livestreams category for the NowThis Presidential Forum with Joe Biden.

== Controversies and errors ==
In 2015, NowThis published a conspiracy theory that claimed CNN deleted a poll of Facebook users asserting that most participants thought that Bernie Sanders beat Hillary Clinton in the first 2016 Democratic Party presidential debate. NowThis created a video titled "It looks like CNN is trying to help Hillary look good, even if that means deleting polls." PolitiFact found that CNN did not delete the poll in question and in fact displayed the results of the poll during its broadcast and also published the poll on its Facebook page. The claim was rated as "Pants on Fire" false by PolitiFact.

After Donald Trump was elected president in 2016, NowThis posted a clip of CNN commentator Van Jones giving a speech about the election results on their social media. The posted clip generated over 23 million views on Facebook, and NowThis included its own logo in the upper corner, not CNN's. CNN accused NowThis of violating their intellectual property rights and stated that video "was used without attribution or permission", and they were "exploring [their] options with regards to NowThis, Facebook and Twitter." NowThis removed the clip from their Facebook, while it remained on their Twitter.

During the 2016 United States presidential election, NowThis repeatedly claimed that Trump lied about Bill Clinton signing the North American Free Trade Agreement (NAFTA) using videos posted on Facebook and YouTube. PolitiFact found that Bill Clinton signed the final version of the NAFTA as Trump had stated, and rated the claim false.

In September 2019, NowThis tweeted out that "Republicans in North Carolina used a 9/11 memorial to trick Democrats into missing a key vote", which was later shared by Senator Elizabeth Warren. PolitiFact rated the claim false and discovered only one Democrat was at a 9/11 memorial during the time North Carolina Republicans held a controversial budget vote. NowThis did not correct their claim.

In January 2020, NowThis removed a segment of a video they posted where a George Washington University student falsely claimed that Holocaust diarist Anne Frank did not die in a concentration camp. Frank died in the Bergen-Belsen concentration camp in either February or March 1945.

In June 2020, numerous accusations of sexual misconduct were levied at NowThis associate producer Jackson Davis after Alexandria Ocasio-Cortez quote-tweeted a graphic he created. NowThis suspended Davis. Following an external investigation, he was removed from the company.
