= List of Movie Fights episodes =

This is a list of Movie Fights episodes which have been published on YouTube by Screen Junkies.

== Episodes ==
=== 2014 ===
No.	Title	Host/Judge	Contestants (winner in bold)	Fact checker	Original release date
1	"Should They Reboot Ghostbusters?"	Andy Signore	**Hal Rudnick**; Spencer Gilbert; Nick Mundy (Note: originally declared a three-way tie (even though Hal actually only scored 4 points to Spencer's and Nick's 5 each), Hal was declared winner after winning episode 52)	N/A	October 12, 2014
2	"Captain America vs. Iron Man"	Andy Signore	Erin Robinson; **Dan Murrell**; Nick Mundy	N/A	October 19, 2014
3	"Age of Ultron Trailer Debate"	Andy Signore	Hal Rudnick; **Dan Murrell**; Spencer Gilbert	N/A	October 26, 2014
4	"Best Marvel Phase 3 Movie"	Andy Signore	Hal Rudnick; Michael Barryte; **Mike Carlson**	N/A	November 2, 2014
5	"Does Interstellar Suck?"	Andy Signore	**Spencer Gilbert**; Roger Barr; Nick Mundy	Dan Murrell	November 9, 2014
6	"Best Quentin Tarantino Movie"	Dan Murrell	Hal Rudnick; **Mike Carlson**; Nick Mundy	Jason Inman	November 16, 2014
7	"Which Superhero Wins The Hunger Games?"	Andy Signore	**Spencer Gilbert**; Roger Barr; Mark Ellis	Dan Murrell	November 23, 2014
8	"Star Wars VS Star Trek"	Andy Signore	Hal Rudnick; Mike Carlson; **Jason Inman**	Dan Murrell	November 30, 2014
9	"New Star Wars Lightsaber - Awesome or Useless?"	Andy Signore	Alison Haislip; **Dan Murrell**; Kassem G	Jason Inman	December 7, 2014
10	"Should Marvel Fire Andrew Garfield as Spider-Man?"	Andy Signore	Kristian Harloff; **Mark Ellis**; Hal Rudnick	Dan Murrell	December 14, 2014
11	"Magneto vs. Gandalf - Best Ian McKellen Movie"	Andy Signore	Jovenshire; Roger Barr; **Nick Mundy**	Dan Murrell	December 21, 2014
12	"Best & Worst of 2014"	Dan Murrell	Hal Rudnick; Andy Signore; **Nick Mundy**	Jason Inman	December 28, 2014

=== 2015 ===
No.	Title	Host/Judge	Contestants (winner in bold)	Fact checker	Original release date
13	"What's the Best Year in Movies EVER!?"	Andy Signore	Spencer Gilbert; **Dan Murrell**; Mike Carlson	Jason Inman	January 11, 2015
14	"Oscar Snubs 2015: Who Got Screwed?! (Note: Title Belt Fight)"	Andy Signore	Jason Inman; Mark Ellis; **Dan Murrell**	Brianne Chandler	January 18, 2015
15	"Should Star Wars Ditch George Lucas?"	Andy Signore	Trisha Hershberger; **Comic Book Girl 19**; Nick Mundy	Dan Murrell	January 25, 2015
16	"Should Indiana Jones be Rebooted w/ Chris Pratt?"	Andy Signore	Spencer Gilbert; **Alicia Malone**; Roger Barr	Dan Murrell	February 1, 2015
17	"Does The Hobbit Suck?"	Dan Murrell	Jeremy Jahns & Kristian Harloff; **Screen Junkies** (Note: Screen Junkies were represented by Andy Signore, Spencer Gilbert, Hal Rudnick & Nick Mundy)	Jason Inman	February 8, 2015
18	"Who Should Marvel's Spider-Man Fight Next?"	Andy Signore	Comic Book Girl 19; Alicia Malone; **Dan Murrell**	Spencer Gilbert	February 15, 2015
19	"Zack Snyder's Aquaman - Awesome or Awful?"	Andy Signore	Hal Rudnick; Tiffany Smith; **Mike Carlson**	Dan Murrell	February 22, 2015
20 (Note: First fight on Screen Junkies' new set, previous episodes were recorded on the Popcorn Talk Network set)	"Which Kids' Franchise Needs a Gritty Reboot?"	Andy Signore	Matt Raub; Steve Zaragoza; **Marc Andreyko**	Dan Murrell	March 1, 2015
21	"Avengers: Age of Ultron End Credits Scenes!"	Andy Signore	Mike Carlson; Marc Andreyko; **Spencer Gilbert**	Dan Murrell	March 8, 2015
22	"Star Wars Spinoffs - Good Idea or Bad Idea?"	Andy Signore	Jason Inman; **Roger Barr**; Erin Robinson	Dan Murrell	March 15, 2015
23	"Iron Man VS Darth Vader"	Andy Signore	**Alicia Malone**; Kristian Harloff; Scott Mantz	Dan Murrell	March 22, 2015
24	"Better Franchise: Mission Impossible or Fast & Furious?"	Andy Signore	Alicia Malone; Roger Barr; **Nick Mundy**	Dan Murrell	March 29, 2015
25	"Who Should Be the Next Wolverine?"	Andy Signore	Mika Valleau; **Bryan Chambers**; Tony Tubes Zerr	(Note: Special fan episode with Spencer Gilbert, Dan Murrell & Nick Mundy acting as coaches; Dan stepped in for one fight on behalf of Bryan, but he did not win)	April 5, 2015
26	"Ultimate Game of Thrones Spin-off Movie?"	Andy Signore	Spencer Gilbert; Nick Mundy; **Dan Murrell**	Scott Mantz	April 12, 2015
27	"Batman v. Superman Trailer - Awesome or Awful?"	Andy Signore	**Hal Rudnick**; Jason Inman; Trisha Hershberger	Dan Murrell	April 19, 2015
28	"Will Jurassic World Suck?"	Nick Mundy	Roger Barr; **Dan Murrell**; Andy Signore	Jason Inman (Note: Special guest Dennis Mundy)	April 26, 2015
29	"Age of Ultron - Overhyped?"	Andy Signore	Mike Carlson; **Amy Nicholson**; Kristian Harloff	Dan Murrell	May 3, 2015
30	"Who Should Play the Punisher?"	Andy Signore	Pat Healy; **Chris Stuckmann**; Nick Mundy	Dan Murrell	May 10, 2015
31	"Best Pixar Movie (CinemaSins vs. Honest Trailers)"	Kristian Harloff	CinemaSins (Note: CinemaSins were represented by Jeremy Scott & Chris Atkinson); **Screen Junkies** (Note: Screen Junkies were represented by Andy Signore & Dan Murrell)	Brit Fofana	May 17, 2015
32	"McConaughey in the Marvel Universe?!"	Andy Signore	Miri Jedeikin; Mark Ellis; **Alicia Malone**	Dan Murrell	May 24, 2015
33	"Which Disney Character Needs a Spin-Off?"	Andy Signore	Andre Meadows; **Germain Lussier**; Spencer Gilbert	Dan Murrell	May 31, 2015
34	"Dream Superhero Movie Director"	Andy Signore	**Davis**; Michael Barryte; Hal Rudnick	Dan Murrell	June 7, 2015
35	"Jurassic World - Fun or Failure?"	Spencer Gilbert	Dan Murrell; **Mike Carlson**; Andy Signore	Jason Inman	June 14, 2015
36	"Most Traumatizing Kid's Movie?"	Andy Signore	John Rocha; Jon Schnepp; **Nick Mundy**	Dan Murrell (Note: Special guest Steve Signore)	June 21, 2015
37	"Who Should Play Green Lantern?"	Andy Signore	Doug Walker; **Amy Nicholson**; Dan Murrell	Spencer Gilbert	June 28, 2015
38	"Worst Terminator Sequel?"	Andy Signore	Nick Mundy; Mark Ellis; **Kristian Harloff**	Dan Murrell	July 5, 2015
39	"Justice League vs. Avengers (Note: Special Episode Recorded at San Diego Comic-Con 2015)"	Andy Signore	(Note: Mark Ellis, Jeremy Jahns, Chris Stuckmann, Spencer Gilbert, Dan Murrell, Alicia Malone, Mike Carlson & Nick Mundy)	Hal Rudnick	July 12, 2015
40	"Batman v Superman v Wonder Woman: Who Wins?"	Andy Signore	Mark Reilly; Marc Andreyko; **Jason Inman**	Dan Murrell	July 19, 2015
41	"Who Should Play Young Han Solo?"	Andy Signore	Alison Haislip; Jon Bailey; **Hal Rudnick**	Dan Murrell	July 26, 2015
42	"What Should Wolverine's Last Movie Be About?"	Andy Signore	Trisha Hershberger; Chloe Dykstra; **Alicia Malone**	Brianne Chandler	August 2, 2015
43	"What Franchise Should Die Forever?!"	Andy Signore	Brett Weiner; Tiffany Smith; **Spencer Gilbert**	Dan Murrell	August 9, 2015
44	"Disney World's Star Wars Land: Dream Ride!? (Note: Live Recorded Episode. Title Belt Fight)"	Andy Signore	**Dan Murrell**; Amy Nicholson; Mike Carlson	Alicia Malone; Spencer Gilbert (Note: Special guests Jan, Vanessa & Margot Signore)	August 16, 2015
45	"How To Fix The Fantastic Four"	Nick Mundy	**Scott Mantz**; Kristian Harloff; Hal Rudnick	Jason Inman (Note: Special guest Dilara Mundy)	August 23, 2015
46	"Han Solo vs Indiana Jones (Note: Special Episode Recorded at Wizard World Comic-Con 2015)"	Andy Signore	(Note: Dan Murrell, Doug Walker, John Flickinger, Chris Stuckmann, Jared McMorrow, Joe Armenta, April O'Donnell & Joe Simpson)	Andre Meadows	August 30, 2015
47	"Man of Steel 2 Pitches Featuring Max Landis"	Andy Signore	Alicia Malone; Spencer Gilbert; **Max Landis**	Dan Murrell (Note: Special guest April O'Donnell)	September 6, 2015
48	"Best Lord of the Rings Movie with Elijah Wood"	Andy Signore	Nick Mundy; Dan Murrell; **Elijah Wood**	Alicia Malone	September 13, 2015
49	"Who Should Play Robin in the Next Batman Movie?"	Andy Signore	Kim Horcher; John Rocha; **Scott Mantz**	Dan Murrell	September 20, 2015
50	"Pacific Rim 2: Pitch the Dream Sequel"	Andy Signore	**Kofi Outlaw**; Trisha Hershberger; Roger Barr	Dan Murrell	September 27, 2015
51	"Dream Avengers Phase 4 Lineup"	Andy Signore	Roxy Striar; **Andre Meadows**; Brett Weiner	Dan Murrell	October 4, 2015
52	"Best Movie Fight! - Movie Fights 1 Year Epic Battle!"	Andy Signore	**Hal Rudnick**; Nick Mundy; Spencer Gilbert	Dan Murrell (Note: Special guests Alicia Malone, Jeremy Jahns, Mike Carlson, Kristian Harloff & Chris Stuckmann)	October 11, 2015
53	"Dream Back to the Future Sequel"	Dan Murrell	Miri Jedeikin; **Mike Carlson**; Adam Johnston	Spencer Gilbert	October 18, 2015
54	"Luke Skywalker: Good or Evil?"	Alicia Malone	Scott Mantz; Grae Drake; **Dan Murrell**	Spencer Gilbert (Note: Special guest Stacey Howard)	October 26, 2015
55	"Wes Anderson: Horror Director?"	Andy Signore	Marc Andreyko; Ben Begley; **Mark Ellis**	Dan Murrell (Note: Special guest Meredith Loftus)	November 1, 2015
56	"Casting Shazam! opposite The Rock plus HUGE SJ NEWS!!"	Hal Rudnick	Spencer Gilbert; Nick Mundy; **Andy Signore**	Roxy Striar	November 8, 2015
57	"Best Stoner Movie? with Doug Benson!"	Andy Signore	Scott Mantz; Chloe Dykstra; **Doug Benson**	Dan Murrell	November 15, 2015
58	"What Star Wars Character Would Win The Hunger Games? (Note: Fifth Title Belt Fight; Dan defends against those who have beaten him at Cons.)"	Andy Signore	Chris Stuckmann; Spencer Gilbert; **Dan Murrell**	Ken Napzok (Note: Special guest Samantha Stuckmann)	November 21, 2015
59	"Jessica Jones and MCU Team Up?"	Andy Signore	Marc Andreyko; **Mike Carlson**; Roger Barr	Dan Murrell	November 28, 2015
60	"Best Moment in the Batman v Superman Trailer?"	Dan Murrell	Umberto Gonzalez; Andy Signore; **Kim Horcher**	Mark Reilly	December 5, 2015
61	"Pitch a Solo Batman Movie with Kevin Smith"	Andy Signore	Mike Carlson; **Kevin Smith**; Dan Murrell	Alicia Malone (Note: Special guest Ben Goddard)	December 12, 2015
62	"Star Trek Beyond Trailer: Good or Bad?"	Andy Signore	John Rocha; Doug Benson; **JTE**	Dan Murrell	December 19, 2015
63	"Is The Force Awakens The Best Star Wars Movie?"	Andy Signore	Hector Navarro; Yancy Berns; **Ken Napzok**	Roxy Striar	December 26, 2015

=== 2016 ===
No.	Title	Host/Judge	Contestants (winner in bold)	Fact checker	Original release date
64	"Pitch a Matrix Sequel!"	Alicia Malone	Dan Murrell; Spencer Gilbert; **Andy Signore**	Ken Napzok	January 2, 2016
65	"Best Movie of 2015?"	Andy Signore	Alison Haislip; **Ben Begley**; Cody Decker	Dan Murrell	January 9, 2016
66	"Biggest Oscar Snub?"	Andy Signore	Alicia Malone; Amirose Eisenbach; **Dan Murrell**	Ken Napzok	January 16, 2016
67	"Best Suicide Squad Trailer Moment?"	Andy Signore	**Marc Andreyko**; Erin Robinson; Mark Reilly	Dan Murrell	January 23, 2016
68	"Best Animated Sequel?"	Andy Signore	Brett Erlich; Adam Hlavac; **Hal Rudnick**	Dan Murrell	January 30, 2016
69	"Pitch The Next Big Fast & Furious Action Sequence!"	Andy Signore	Mike Carlson (Note: Dan Murrell played for Carlson for first 4 rounds; after Carlson arrived, Dan took over as fact checker from Ken); Rob Fee; **Max Landis**	Dan Murrell; Ken Napzok (Note: Special guest James Connery)	February 6, 2016
70	"Will Batman v Superman Be Great?"	Andy Signore	Kristian Harloff; Mark Ellis; **JTE**	Dan Murrell (Note: Special guest Jeannine Brice)	February 13, 2016
71	"Pitch a Deadpool Sequel with Kevin Smith"	Andy Signore	Marc Andreyko; **Kevin Smith**; Spencer Gilbert	Dan Murrell	February 20, 2016
72	"Who Should Join the Justice League?"	Andy Signore	**Jason Inman**; Trisha Hershberger; Ryan Right	Dan Murrell	February 27, 2016
73	"New Ghostbusters Trailer: Should We Be Worried? (Note: featuring a question from Gerard Butler)"	Andy Signore	Jeremy Jahns; Scott Mantz; **John Rocha**	Dan Murrell	March 5, 2016
74	"Could Captain America: Civil War Suck?"	Andy Signore	**Hal Rudnick**; Roger Barr; Nick Mundy	Dan Murrell	March 12, 2016
75	"Pitch Indiana Jones 5!"	Andy Signore	Chris Stuckmann; Brett Erlich; **John Flickinger**	Dan Murrell (Note: Special guest Galen & Eli White)	March 19, 2016
76	"Which Superhero Would You Want To Be? (Note: Last Fighter Standing)"	Andy Signore	(Note: Dan Murrell, Alicia Malone, Mike Carlson, Hal Rudnick, Spencer Gilbert, JTE, Scott Mantz & Marc Andreyko)	Joe Starr	March 26, 2016
77	"Batman v Superman: Fun or Failure?"	Andy Signore	**John Campea & Marc Andreyko**; Dan Murrell & Harley Morenstein	Trisha Hershberger	April 2, 2016
78	"Best "Star Wars: Rogue One" Trailer Moment?"	Andy Signore	Trisha Hershberger; **Jon Schnepp**; Stephen Glickman	Dan Murrell (Note: Special guest Karin Kirchner)	April 9, 2016
79	"Pitch the Plot To Spider-Man: Homecoming!"	Alicia Malone	Maude Garrett; Roth Cornet; **Clarke Wolfe**	Meg McCarthy	April 16, 2016
80	"Best Movie Character Prom Date?"	Andy Signore	Jen Yamato; **Amy Nicholson**; Kara Warner	Dan Murrell (Note: Special guest Troy Loxton)	April 23, 2016
81	"What will be the best Live Action Disney Film?"	Andy Signore	John Rocha; Jeff Cannata; **Hector Navarro**	Joe Starr	April 30, 2016
82	"Worst MCU Villain To Date? (Note: Drunk Movie Fights)"	Andy Signore	Spencer Gilbert; **Ken Napzok**; Dan Murrell	Joe Starr	May 7, 2016
83	"Where Does Civil War Rank in the MCU? (w/ Kevin Smith)"	Andy Signore	Kevin Smith; Zack Stentz; **Hal Rudnick**	Joe Starr (Note: Special guest Sarah Tolley)	May 14, 2016
84	"Who Should Play Female Wolverine (X-23)?"	Andy Signore	Germain Lussier; Kim Horcher; **Samm Levine**	Dan Murrell (Note: Special guest CJ Lindsey)	May 21, 2016
85	"Pitch Austin Powers 4?"	Andy Signore	Cody Decker; Sasha Perl-Raver; **Coy Jandreau**	Dan Murrell (Note: Special guest Zac Roberts)	May 28, 2016
86	"Dream Ninja Turtles Movie Crossovers!"	Andy Signore	Doug Jones; Brett Erlich; **Matt Raub**	Dan Murrell	June 4, 2016
87	"Who Should Join Black Panther?"	Andy Signore	Matt Stagmer; Erik Davis; **Roth Cornet**	Dan Murrell (Note: Special guest Will Strange)	June 11, 2016
88	"Pitch the 1990s Avengers!"	Andy Signore	**Mike Carlson**; Nick Mundy; Joe Starr	Dan Murrell (Note: Special guest Pete Samoylo)	June 18, 2016
89	"How will Darth Vader return in Rogue One?"	Andy Signore	Marc Andreyko; **Alicia Malone**; Hal Rudnick	Dan Murrell	June 25, 2016
90	"What Is The Worst Part of Independence Day: Resurgence?"	Andy Signore	Doug Benson; **Mark Ellis**; Stephen Glickman	Dan Murrell (Note: Special guest Christopher Spencer)	July 2, 2016
91	"What Is The Best Movie Of 2016 (So Far)?"	Dan Murrell	**Coy Jandreau**; JTE; Jon Schnepp	Joe Starr	July 9, 2016
92	"What Is The Most Influential Film?"	Alicia Malone	Amy Nicholson; **Alonso Duralde**; Scott Mantz	Ken Napzok	July 16, 2016
93	"All Star Movie Fights! Feat. Kevin Smith (Note: Special Live Episode Recorded at San Diego Comic-Con 2016)"	Kevin Smith (Note: Max Landis filled in for Smith as judge for first 2 rounds)	**Hal Rudnick**; Dan Murrell; Andy Signore	Alicia Malone	July 22, 2016
94	"Best Star Trek Captain?"	Andy Signore	Dan Murrell; Mark A. Altman; **Brannon Braga**	Alicia Malone	July 22, 2016
95	"Best Part of the Wonder Woman Trailer?"	Andy Signore	Dan Casey; Roth Cornet; **Dan Murrell**	Joe Starr	July 30, 2016
96	"Best Movie Sex Scene! (w/ Seth Rogen)"	Andy Signore	**Seth Rogen**; Joe Starr; Spencer Gilbert	Dan Murrell	August 6, 2016
97	"Suicide Squad: Rotten or Fresh?"	Spencer Gilbert	Andy Signore; Hal Rudnick; **Dan Murrell**	Joe Starr	August 13, 2016
98	"Who Will Be The Stand Out Character From Rogue One?"	Andy Signore	Coy Jandreau; **Alicia Malone**; Brett Erlich	Dan Murrell (Note: Special guest Chris Clinton)	August 20, 2016
99	"Cast The Justice League Dark Movie!"	Andy Signore	Marc Andreyko; Hector Navarro; **Tony Revolori**	Dan Murrell (Note: Special guest Bret Pendleton)	August 27, 2016
100	"Best Comic Book Movie of All-Time? SDCC 2016! (Note: Special Episode Recorded at San Diego Comic-Con 2016)"	Andy Signore	(Note: Mike Carlson, Nick Mundy, Alicia Malone, Zack Stentz, Max Landis, Doug Benson, Dan Murrell & Spencer Gilbert)	N/A	September 3, 2016
101	"Most Disappointing Movie of Summer 2016!"	Andy Signore	Max Landis; **Dan Murrell**	Joe Starr (Note: Special guest Donald Davis)	September 10, 2016
102	"Which Pixar Movie Deserves a Live-Action Reboot?"	Andy Signore	**Mike Carlson**; Cody Decker; Samm Levine	Dan Murrell	September 17, 2016
103	"Ghost in the Shell – Will It Work?"	Andy Signore	Joe Starr; **Sasha Perl-Raver**; Jay Washington	Dan Murrell (Note: Special guest Ian Candish)	September 24, 2016
104	"Lion King Remake Must Haves?"	Andy Signore	Steve Zaragoza; **Trisha Hershberger**; Lon Harris	Dan Murrell (Note: Special guest Jeff Kang)	October 1, 2016
105	"How To Fix Pirates of the Caribbean"	Andy Signore	John Rocha; Graham Elwood; **JTE**	Dan Murrell	October 8, 2016
106	"Cast Aladdin’s Live Action Genie!"	Marc Andreyko	**Andy Signore**; Roth Cornet; Joe Starr	Spencer Gilbert (Note: Special guest Danny Petruska)	October 15, 2016
107	"Best Zombie Movie w/ Robert Kirkman"	Andy Signore	**Max Landis**; David Alpert; Robert Kirkman	Dan Murrell	October 22, 2016
108	"Deadliest Horror Villain?"	Clarke Wolfe	Roger Barr; Josh Robert Thompson; **Ben Begley**	Lon Harris	October 29, 2016
109	"What Franchise Should Wonder Woman Join?"	Andy Signore	Stephen Glickman; **Coy Jandreau**; Scott Mantz	Dan Murrell (Note: Special guests Lindsey Pankhurst & Abe Saldana)	November 5, 2016
110	"What is the Best Movie Alien?"	Andy Signore	Brett Erlich; Lon Harris; **Jacqueline Coley**	Dan Murrell (Note: Special guest Alina Lewis)	November 12, 2016
111	"What is the Best Harry Potter Movie?"	Andy Signore	Trisha Hershberger; **Gina Ippolito**; Spencer Gilbert	Roth Cornet; Erika Ishii	November 19, 2016
112	"Dumbest Movie Premise of All Time? (Note: Last Fighter Standing II)"	Andy Signore	(Note: Mike Carlson, Spencer Gilbert, Joe Starr, Marc Andreyko, Coy Jandreau, JTE, Sasha Perl-Raver & Scott Mantz)	Dan Murrell (Note: Special guest Tybee Diskin)	November 26, 2016
113	"Worst Comic Book Movie? (TRICK QUESTION)"	Andy Signore	Hal Rudnick; Coy Jandreau; **Dan Murrell**	Joe Starr	December 3, 2016
114	"Greatest Lightsaber Fighter - Star Wars: MOVIE FIGHTS!"	Andy Signore	**Kristian Harloff**; Dan Casey; Emma Fyffe	Dan Murrell (Note: Special guest Jared Haibon)	December 10, 2016
115	"Rogue One: Did We Need It!? (Note: Drunk Movie Fights Title Belt Fight)"	Dan Murrell	Alicia Malone; **Ken Napzok**; Andy Signore	Joe Starr; Marc Andreyko	December 17, 2016
116	"Best Movie Decade of All Time?"	Alicia Malone	Roth Cornet; **Leonard Maltin**; Sasha Perl-Raver	Jessie Maltin	December 24, 2016
117	"What Is The Best Movie of 1994?"	Joe Starr	Andy Signore; Spencer Gilbert; **Dan Murrell**	Lon Harris	December 31, 2016

=== 2017 ===
No.	Title	Host/Judge	Contestants (winner in bold)	Fact checker	Original release date
118	"Best Movie of 2016"	Andy Signore	**Marc Andreyko**; Roth Cornet; Scott Mantz	Dan Murrell (Note: Special guests Jack Shipley, Maggie Baine & Jonathan Youngblood)	January 7, 2017
119	"Best SNL Movie Star"	Andy Signore	Ian Hecox; Jack Henry Robbins; **Joe Starr**	Dan Murrell (Note: Special guests Jorel Blu & Dan Hernandez)	January 14, 2017
120	"Ultimate G.I. Joe / Transformers Crossover"	Andy Signore	Matt Iseman; Andre Meadows; **John Flickinger**	Dan Murrell (Note: Special guest Dylan Berry)	January 21, 2017
121	"Fan Fights: Worst Performance of 2016"	Andy Signore	Jonathan Youngblood; Adry Sotolongo; **Dan Hernandez**	Dan Murrell (Note: Special guest Randall Sans)	January 28, 2017
122	"Who Should Direct the Batman?"	Doug Benson	Andy Signore & Horatio Sanz; **Dan Murrell & Greg Proops**	Joe Starr; Lon Harris	February 4, 2017
123	"Who Should Get Their Own LEGO Movie?"	Andy Signore	**JTE**; Lon Harris; Billy Business	Dan Murrell	February 11, 2017
124	"What Schwarzenegger Character Would Win in a Battle Royale?"	Andy Signore	**Mike Carlson**; Evan Susser; Van Robichaux	Dan Murrell (Note: Special guest Shane Schlosser)	February 18, 2017
125	"Improve a Movie By Adding Predator!"	Andy Signore	**Grae Drake**; Hal Rudnick; Jackie Kashian	Dan Murrell (Note: Special guest Patrick Cummings)	February 25, 2017
126	"Star Wars vs. Star Trek!"	Andy Signore	**Scott Mantz**; John Rocha	Dan Murrell (Note: Special guests Jake Celestin, Brie Chapman, Antonio Marqueda-Wiltz, Matthew Joseph & Simone FB)	March 4, 2017
127	"What Superhero Should Return When They're Old?"	Andy Signore	**Paul Scheer**; Kumail Nanjiani; Spencer Gilbert	Dan Murrell (Note: Special guest Michael Sugarman)	March 11, 2017
128	"Aladdin vs. The Little Mermaid vs. The Lion King!"	Andy Signore; Leonard Maltin	**Sarah Sterling**; Jenny Nicholson; Andre Meadows	Dan Murrell	March 18, 2017
129	"What Superhero Movie Performance Deserves an Oscar?"	Andy Signore	Coy Jandreau; **JTE**; Hal Rudnick	Dan Murrell (Note: Special guests Casey Erin & Connor Kinney)	March 25, 2017
130	"Who Should Play Joss Whedon's Batgirl? (Note: Special Episode Collider All Stars Last Fighter Standing)"	Andy Signore	(Note: Perri Nemiroff, Josh Macuga, Mark Reilly, Kristian Harloff, Wendy Lee, Jon Schnepp, Dennis Tzeng & Ken Napzok)	Dan Murrell	April 1, 2017
131	"Biggest Summer Blockbuster of 2017?!"	Andy Signore	**William Bibbiani**; Brett Erlich; Adi Shankar	Lon Harris (Note: Special guest Travis Wladkowski)	April 8, 2017
132	"Who is the Greatest Director of The 1970s?!"	Alicia Malone	Dave Karger; Hal Rudnick; **Dan Murrell**	Lon Harris (Note: Special guest Adam Horton)	April 15, 2017
133	"What Avengers Actor Is the Most Replaceable?"	Andy Signore	**Tony Revolori**; Gina Ippolito; Baron Vaughn	Dan Murrell	April 22, 2017
134	"Who Is The Best Car from Cars? (Note: Debut Deathmatch)"	Andy Signore	(Note: D.J. Wooldridge, Danielle Radford, Ed Greer, Victor Torres, Markeia McCarty, Charley Feldman, Max Song, Eric Goldman & Stacy Howard)	Dan Murrell (Note: Special guest Frankie Giannetto)	April 29, 2017
135	"Pitch the 1980s Guardians of the Galaxy!"	Andy Signore	Mike Carlson; Joe Starr; **Scott Aukerman**	Dan Murrell	May 6, 2017
136	"Who's The Best Guardian of The Galaxy?"	Andy Signore	Coy Jandreau; Markeia McCarty; **Matthew Key**	Dan Murrell	May 13, 2017
137	"Best Nicolas Cage Performance?!"	Andy Signore	John Flickinger; Charley Feldman; **Mark Ellis**	Dan Murrell (Note: Special guest "Nicolas Cage" (Brock Baker))	May 20, 2017
138	"Worst Movie of the Alien Franchise?"	Andy Signore	**Mike Carlson**; Coy Jandreau; John Rocha	Dan Murrell	May 27, 2017
139	"Best DC Movie?"	Andy Signore	**Marc Andreyko**; Ashley V. Robinson; D.J. Wooldridge	Dan Murrell (Note: Special guests Mike & Sammy Cappetto)	June 3, 2017
140	"What Monster Movie Could Save The Mummy’s Dark Universe? (Note: Winner faces Dan Murrell for the Movie Fights Championship)"	Andy Signore	JTE; **Mike Carlson**; Scott Mantz	Dan Murrell (Note: Special guest Andrew DiLuzio)	June 10, 2017
141	"Who is The Best Pixar Character?"	Dan Murrell	Ed Greer; Perri Nemiroff; **Jon Negroni**	Lon Harris (Note: Special guest Richard Higinbotham)	June 17, 2017
142	"Is Star Wars in Trouble?"	Andy Signore	Roger Barr; **Sasha Perl-Raver**; Jay Washington	Dan Murrell	June 24, 2017
143	"Cast A Live-Action Minions Movie (w/ Rob Corddry!)"	Andy Signore	Hal Rudnick; Dan Murrell; **Rob Corddry**	Lon Harris	July 1, 2017
144	"Best Spider-Man Performance?"	Andy Signore	**Alicia Malone**; Tony Revolori; Jenny Nicholson	Dan Murrell (Note: Special guests Tom Zambeno & DeVaughn Taylor)	July 8, 2017
145	"MOVIE FIGHTS CHAMPIONSHIP! - E.T. vs Jaws"	Andy Signore	Mike Carlson; **Dan Murrell**	Lon Harris (Note: Special guest Michael Bietz)	July 13, 2017
146	"Kevin Smith vs Elijah Wood! (Note: Special Episode Recorded at San Diego Comic-Con 2017)"	Andy Signore	Dan Murrell; **Kevin Smith**; Elijah Wood	Alicia Malone	July 27, 2017
147	"What's Worse Than The Emoji Movie?"	Dan Murrell	Coy Jandreau; Charley Feldman; **Spencer Gilbert**	Lon Harris	August 3, 2017
148	"The Force vs The Hulk!"	Andy Signore	(Note: Mike Carlson, Alicia Malone, Mark Ellis, Samm Levine, Tony Revolori, Doug Benson, Dan Murrell & Spencer Gilbert)	Hal Rudnick	August 10, 2017
149	"What Movie Character Would Have the Best Instagram Account?"	Hal Rudnick	**D.J. Wooldridge**; Brett Erlich; Darien Sills-Evans	Lon Harris (Note: Special guest Alex from Irvine)	August 17, 2017
150	"Who Should Play The Joker?"	Andy Signore	Joe Starr; Hal Rudnick; **Graham Elwood**	Dan Murrell	August 24, 2017
151	"Worst Movie of Summer 2017?!"	Andy Signore	**Dan Murrell**; Danielle Radford; Marc Andreyko	Lon Harris (Note: Special guests Will & Issac Robinson Smith)	August 31, 2017
152	"Who Should Direct Star Wars: Episode 9?"	Andy Signore	Ben Begley; Trisha Hershberger; **James Clement**	Dan Murrell	September 7, 2017
153	"Which Franchise Would Be Most Improved By Adding Pennywise?"	Andy Signore	(Note: Mary Risk, Matt Knost, Brett Register, Meg McCarthy, Dave Child, Michelle Nguyen, Yael Tygiel, Ace Cabrera & Eben McGarr)	Dan Murrell (Note: Special guest Adam Theer)	September 14, 2017
154	"Marvel Phase 4 Movies We Want to See Most (w/ Max Landis)"	Andy Signore	Max Landis; Roth Cornet; **Spencer Gilbert**	Lon Harris (Note: Special guests Nico Lucero and Ian Candish)	September 21, 2017
155	"Best Movie of the 80's!! - 80'S MOVIE FIGHTS!!"	Alicia Malone	Sasha Perl-Raver; **Marc Andreyko**; Brianne Chandler	Jack Hind (Note: Special guest Candace Smith)	September 28, 2017
156	"Best Harrison Ford Performance?!"	Andy Signore	**Dan Murrell**; D.J. Wooldridge; JTE	Joe Starr (Note: Special guest Jared Diamond)	October 5, 2017
157	"Best Superhero Movie of 2017?!"	Hal Rudnick	**Dan Murrell**; Spencer Gilbert	Roth Cornet; Danielle Radford	December 14, 2017

=== 2018 ===
No.	Title	Host/Judge	Contestants (winner in bold)	Fact checker	Original release date
158	"Best/Worst Movies of 2017!"	Hal Rudnick	Joe Starr; **Danielle Radford**	Dan Murrell; Roxy Striar	January 11, 2018
159	"How to Kill Movies Forever?"	Hal Rudnick	Mark Ellis; **Mike Carlson**	Dan Murrell; Danielle Radford	January 18, 2018
160	"The LAST Last Jedi Debate!"	Hal Rudnick	Scott Mantz; **Jenny Nicholson**	Dan Murrell; Danielle Radford	January 25, 2018
161	"What Marvel Villain Needs to Return for a Sequel?"	Hal Rudnick	Coy Jandreau; **Ed Greer**	Dan Murrell; Danielle Radford	February 1, 2018
162	"The Craziest Star Wars Directors Picks!"	Hal Rudnick	**Dan Murrell**; Rachel Cushing	Lon Harris; Danielle Radford	February 8, 2018
163	"What is the Best Comic Book Origin Movie?"	Hal Rudnick	**D.J. Wooldridge**; Markeia McCarty	Dan Murrell; Danielle Radford	February 15, 2018
164	"What’s the Best Sci-Fi Movie of the 21st Century?"	Hal Rudnick	Stacy Howard; **Brianne Chandler**	Lon Harris; Danielle Radford	February 22, 2018
165	"Should Disney Stop Making Star Wars Movies?"	Hal Rudnick	Ken Napzok; **Spencer Gilbert**	Dan Murrell; Billy Business	March 1, 2018
166	"What is the Most Badass Movie Scene Of All Time?"	Hal Rudnick	JTE; **Jay Washington**	Lon Harris; Danielle Radford	March 8, 2018
167	"Is the "Fantastic Beasts" Series A Bad Idea?"	Hal Rudnick	Lon Harris; **William Bibbiani**	Dan Murrell; Danielle Radford	March 15, 2018
168	"Which Director Will Be The Next Spielberg?"	Hal Rudnick	Josh Macuga; Joe Starr; **Ed Greer**	Dan Murrell; Danielle Radford	March 29, 2018
169	"Best Science Fiction Movie Of All Time?"	Hal Rudnick	**Marc Andreyko**; Mike Carlson; Danielle Radford	Dan Murrell; Roth Cornet	April 5, 2018
170	"The Ultimate Star Wars Spinoff!"	Hal Rudnick	Spencer Gilbert; Yael Tygiel; **Marc Bernardin**	Dan Murrell; Danielle Radford	April 12, 2018
171	"What Will Be the Best Movie of Summer 2018?"	Hal Rudnick	Ken Napzok; Erika Ishii; **Dan Murrell**	Lon Harris; Danielle Radford	April 19, 2018
172	"Recast the MCU Avengers!"	Hal Rudnick	Coy Jandreau; **Ify Nwadiwe**; Amy Cassandra	Joe Starr; Danielle Radford	April 26, 2018
173	"MOVIE FIGHTS EXTRAVAGANZA!! (50+ All Star Fighters)"	Hal Rudnick (Fights 1–2, 4, 8, 11); Roxy Striar (Fights 3, 6–7); Roth Cornet (Fight 5); Grae Drake (Fight 9); Matt Raub (Fight 10); Doug Benson (Fight 12)	Spencer Gilbert; **Joe Starr**; Dan Murrell (Note: Honest Trailer Fights) First Gauntlet Fights (Note: Brianne Chandler, Tony Revolori, Ed Greer, Riley Silverman, Jay Washington & Marc Andreyko) **Emma Fyffe**; Erika Ishii (Note: Anime Fights) **Hector Navarro**; Jacqueline Coley; Dan Casey (Note: Hyper Heroes Fights) Alicia Malone; **Leonard Maltin**; Jessie Maltin (Note: Classic Movie Fights) Second Gauntlet Fights (Note: Ify Nwadiwe, Matt Key, Wendy Lee Szany, Markeia McCarty, Amy Dallen, Lon Harris & Coy Jandreau) Yael Tygiel; Stacy Howard; **Michele Boyd** (Note: TV Fights) Mark Ellis; **Perri Nemiroff**; John Rocha (Note: Collider Fights) Jacqueline Coley; **Roth Cornet**; Amy Nicholson (Note: Critic Fights) **Greg Miller**; Sonja Reid; Pamela Horton (Note: Gamer Fights) **Cucumber**; Chunk; Mike Carlson (Note: Felted Fights: Title Belt Fight) Marc Bernardin; **Clarke Wolfe**; Samm Levine (Note: Doug Loves Movies Fights)	Dan Murrell (Fights 4–5, 11–12); Danielle Radford (Fights 1, 4, 9, 11–12); Roth Cornet (Fight 1); Max Song (Fight 3); Joe Starr (Fight 3); Ken Napzok (Fight 7); Billy Business (Fight 7); Kristian Harloff (Fight 8); Wendy Lee Szany (Fight 8); Jen Yamato (Fight 9); Nikole Z (Fight 10); Spencer Gilbert (Fight 10)	May 3, 2018
174	"Who's The Infinity War MVP?"	Hal Rudnick	Scott Mantz; Emma Fyffe; **D.J. Wooldridge**	Dan Murrell; Danielle Radford	May 10, 2018
175	"Most Disappointing Superhero Sequel Ever?"	Hal Rudnick	**William Bibbiani**; Ace Cabrera; Alana Jordan	Dan Murrell; Danielle Radford	May 17, 2018
176	"Who Should Play Boba Fett in the New Star Wars Spinoff?"	Hal Rudnick	**Matt Knost**; Jay Washington; Joelle Monique	Dan Murrell; Danielle Radford	May 24, 2018
177	"What Should Disney Do with Star Wars Now?"	Hal Rudnick	Josh Macuga; Yael Tygiel; **Greg Alba**	Dan Murrell; Billy Business	May 31, 2018
178	"Honest Trailer Movie Fights!"	Hal Rudnick	Spencer Gilbert; Joe Starr; **Dan Murrell**	Lon Harris; Danielle Radford	June 7, 2018
179	"Worst Children's Show Host!"	Hal Rudnick	Rob Corddry; Brian Huskey; **Seth Morris**	Lon Harris; Danielle Radford	June 14, 2018
180	"Worst Movie That Critics Loved!"	Hal Rudnick	**Tony Hinchcliffe**; Brian Redban; Jeremiah Watkins	Dan Murrell; Danielle Radford	June 21, 2018
181	"Recasting The Watchmen!"	Hal Rudnick	Mike Carlson; **Sasha Perl-Raver**; Jordan Morris	Dan Murrell; Danielle Radford	June 28, 2018
182	"The Great American Movie Fights!!"	Hal Rudnick	Joe Starr; Ify Nwadiwe; **Mark Ellis**	Dan Murrell; Danielle Radford	July 5, 2018
183	"Which Batman Villain Should Get Their Own Movie?! (Note: Winner faces Cucumber for the Movie Fights Championship)"	Hal Rudnick	Coy Jandreau; Ed Greer; **Dan Murrell**	Lon Harris; Danielle Radford	July 12, 2018
184	"Mission: Impossible vs. Fast and the Furious! (Note: Special Episode Recorded at San Diego Comic-Con 2018)"	Hal Rudnick; Joe Starr	(Note: Spencer Gilbert, Clarke Wolfe, Danielle Radford, Ken Napzok, Coy Jandreau, Dan Murrell, Ed Greer, Emma Fyffe, Mike Carlson, Roth Cornet, Perri Nemiroff and Ify Nwadiwe)	N/A	July 26, 2018
185	"Who Should Direct Guardians of the Galaxy 3?"	Joe Starr	Hal Rudnick; Ed Greer; **Clarke Wolfe**	Dan Murrell; Danielle Radford	August 2, 2018
186	"Who Should Play Supergirl?"	Hal Rudnick	**Marc Andreyko**; Greg Alba; Ken Napzok	Dan Murrell; Lon Harris	August 9, 2018
187	"Who Is The Best Hollywood Chris?"	Hal Rudnick	Cucumber; **Joe Starr**; Erika Ishii	Dan Murrell; Danielle Radford	August 16, 2018
188	"Cast A Famous Animal As James Bond!"	Hal Rudnick	Nick Mundy; **Mike Carlson**; Emma Fyffe	Dan Murrell; Danielle Radford (Note: Special guest Jenn Sterger)	August 23, 2018
189	"Worst Movie of Summer 2018?!"	Hal Rudnick	Spencer Gilbert; Joe Starr; **Lon Harris**	Dan Murrell; Danielle Radford	August 30, 2018
190	"Greatest All Ages Film?!"	Hal Rudnick	Cucumber; Ed Greer; **Dan Murrell**	Lon Harris; Danielle Radford	September 6, 2018
191	"The Best & Worst of DC Movies!"	Hal Rudnick	**Dan Casey**; Clarke Wolfe; Ace Cabrera	Dan Murrell; Danielle Radford	September 13, 2018
192	"Which Marvel Hero Deserves a Streaming Show?"	Hal Rudnick	Sasha Perl-Raver; **Greg Alba**; Stacy Howard	Lon Harris; Danielle Radford	September 20, 2018
193	"Best & Worst of Fall 2018 Predictions!"	Hal Rudnick	**Perri Nemiroff**; Josh Macuga; D.J. Wooldridge	Dan Murrell; Ryan O'Toole	September 27, 2018
194	"2018 Movies To Remember Come Oscar Time!"	Spencer Gilbert	(Note: Mara Knopic, Erik Barnes, Klee Wiggins, Julia Prescott, Cameron Rice, Keely Flaherty, Max Dionne, Andrew Ghai and Vanessa Gritton)	Lon Harris; Danielle Radford	October 4, 2018
195	"How James Gunn Could Fix Suicide Squad?"	Hal Rudnick	**Coy Jandreau**; Erika Ishii; Lon Harris	Dan Murrell; Danielle Radford	October 11, 2018
196	"How Should DC Move Justice League Forward?"	Hal Rudnick	William Bibbiani; **Marc Andreyko**; Ed Greer	Dan Murrell; Danielle Radford	October 18, 2018
197	"The Best of Horror!"	Hal Rudnick	**Clarke Wolfe**; Cameron Rice; Emma Fyffe	Dan Murrell; Vanessa Gritton	October 25, 2018
198	"Who Should Make the Red Dead Redemption Movie?"	Hal Rudnick	**Joe Starr**; Trisha Hershberger; Julia Prescott	Dan Murrell; Danielle Radford	November 1, 2018
199	"What 2018 Movie Will Win Best Picture?"	Joe Starr	Hal Rudnick; Billy Business; **Dan Murrell**	Lon Harris; Danielle Radford	November 8, 2018
200	"Who's The Best Harry Potter Character?"	Hal Rudnick	Ed Greer; Joe Starr; **Vanessa Gritton**	Billy Business; Danielle Radford	November 15, 2018
201	"Honest Trailer Movie Fights Round 2!"	Hal Rudnick	Joe Starr; Spencer Gilbert; **Dan Murrell**	Lon Harris; Danielle Radford	November 22, 2018
202	"Best Action Hero Ever?"	Hal Rudnick	Marc Andreyko; Clarke Wolfe; **Greg Alba**	Lon Harris; Danielle Radford	November 29, 2018
203	"Should Avengers 4 Even Have a Trailer?"	Hal Rudnick	Sasha Perl-Raver; Cameron Rice; **Spencer Gilbert**	Dan Murrell; Danielle Radford	December 6, 2018
204	"Spider-Verse Movie Fights!"	Hal Rudnick	Coy Jandreau; Ed Greer; **Markeia McCarty**	Billy Business; Danielle Radford	December 13, 2018
205	"What Movie Should Aquaman Join?"	Hal Rudnick	Mike Carlson; **Joe Starr**; Julia Prescott	Dan Murrell; Danielle Radford	December 20, 2018
206	"Star Wars vs Marvel vs Lord of the Rings!! (FRANCHISE FIGHTS!)"	Hal Rudnick	**Cucumber** (Note: Representing Lord of The Rings); Ken Napzok (Note: Representing Star Wars); Billy Business (Note: Representing Marvel)	Dan Murrell; Danielle Radford	December 27, 2018

=== 2019 ===
No.	Title	Host/Judge	Contestants (winner in bold)	Fact checker	Original release date
207	"What Will Be The Best Movie Of 2019?"	Hal Rudnick	JTE; **Lon Harris**; Cameron Rice	Max Dionne; Danielle Radford	January 3, 2019
208	"Who Should Control Sony's "Venom" Franchise?"	Hal Rudnick	Ken Napzok; Joe Starr; **Dan Murrell**	Lon Harris; Danielle Radford	January 10, 2019
209	"What is the WORST M. Night Shyamalan movie?"	Hal Rudnick	**Cucumber**; Sasha Perl-Raver; Joe Starr	Dan Murrell; Danielle Radford	January 17, 2019
210	"MOVIE FIGHTS CHAMPIONSHIP!"	Hal Rudnick	Greg Alba; **Dan Murrell**	Lon Harris; Danielle Radford	January 24, 2019
211	"Who Should Be Cast As The Next Batman?"	Hal Rudnick	Cameron Rice; Ace Cabrera; **Billy Business**	Dan Murrell; Danielle Radford	January 31, 2019
212	"Who Should Be Wolverine?"	Dan Murrell	Joe Starr; **Julia Prescott**; Cameron Rice	Lon Harris; Danielle Radford	February 7, 2019
213	"Worst Rom-Com Ever?"	Hal Rudnick	Hector Navarro; **Trisha Hershberger**; Janet Varney	Dan Murrell; Danielle Radford	February 14, 2019
214	"Oscars 2019 Movie Fights!"	Hal Rudnick	Greg Alba; Ken Napzok; **Clarke Wolfe**	Dan Murrell; Danielle Radford	February 21, 2019
215	"2019 Oscars Best Moment!"	Hal Rudnick	Emma Fyffe; Klee Wiggins; **Coy Jandreau**	Dan Murrell; Danielle Radford	February 28, 2019
216	"Which Avenger Should Be a Skrull?"	Hal Rudnick	**Ify Nwadiwe**; Cameron Rice; Markeia McCarty	Dan Murrell; Danielle Radford	March 7, 2019
217	"Who's the Most Powerful Character in the MCU?"	Hal Rudnick	**Dan Murrell**; Kristian Harloff; Billy Business	Ryan O'Toole; Danielle Radford	March 14, 2019
218	"What Horror Movie Should Jordan Peele Remake?"	Hal Rudnick	Greg Alba; Julia Prescott; **Sasha Perl-Raver**	Dan Murrell; Danielle Radford	March 21, 2019
219	"Best Tim Burton Movie?"	Hal Rudnick	**Cucumber**; Ed Greer; Joe Starr	Dan Murrell; Danielle Radford	March 28, 2019
220	"What Was the BEST Movie of 1989?"	Hal Rudnick	**Scott Mantz**; Sam Bashor; Klee Wiggins	Dan Murrell; Danielle Radford	April 4, 2019
221	"Hellboy, Hellfire, & Brimstone!"	Hal Rudnick	Coy Jandreau; Mike Carlson; **Danielle Radford**	Lon Harris; Ryan O'Toole	April 11, 2019
222	"Is the Emperor in Star Wars Episode 9 a Good Idea?"	Hal Rudnick	**JTE**; Sasha Perl-Raver; Scott Mantz	Dan Murrell; Danielle Radford	April 18, 2019
223	"What's the BEST Scene in the MCU?"	Dan Murrell	**Tony Revolori**; Ace Cabrera; Vanessa Gritton	Lon Harris; Danielle Radford	April 25, 2019
224	"Avengers: Endgame Movie Fights!"	Hal Rudnick	Coy Jandreau; Matt Key; **Ed Greer**	Dan Murrell; Lon Harris	May 2, 2019
225	"Worst Movie Character Design?"	Hal Rudnick	**Eric Goldman**; Josh Macuga; Danielle Radford	Dan Murrell; Billy Business	May 9, 2019
226	"Which Character Could Kill John Wick?"	Hal Rudnick	Ken Napzok; Cameron Rice; **Joe Starr**	Dan Murrell; Danielle Radford	May 16, 2019
227	"Greatest Animated Disney Musical of All-Time?"	Hal Rudnick	**Emma Fyffe**; Julia Prescott	Dan Murrell; Danielle Radford	May 23, 2019
228	"Godzilla vs. Stranger Things?!"	Hal Rudnick	Markeia McCarty; Trisha Hershberger; **Greg Alba**	Dan Murrell; Danielle Radford	May 30, 2019
229	"Best Performance in Any X-Men?"	Hal Rudnick	Lon Harris; Danielle Radford; **Dan Murrell**	Ken Napzok; Billy Business	June 6, 2019
230	"Honest Trailer Movie Fights Round 3!"	Hal Rudnick	Spencer Gilbert; Joe Starr; **Dan Murrell**	Lon Harris; Danielle Radford	June 13, 2019
231	"Sinbad in Batman?!"	Hal Rudnick	Mike Carlson; Nick Mundy; **Dan Murrell**	Lon Harris; Danielle Radford	June 20, 2019
232	"Best Performance in a Spider-Man Movie?"	Spencer Gilbert	Greg Alba; Ed Greer; **Dan Murrell**	Lon Harris; Danielle Radford	June 27, 2019
233	"Movie Fights Last Fighter Standing!"	Hal Rudnick	(Note: Ace Cabrera, Scott Mantz, Coy Jandreau, Lon Harris, D.J. Wooldridge, Tony Revolori, Greg Alba, Dan Murrell, Cameron Rice, JTE and Sasha Perl-Raver)	Lon Harris; Danielle Radford; Ed Greer (Note: When Lon Harris Competed in Last Fighter Standing.)	July 4, 2019
234	"COMIC-CON MOVIE FIGHTS 2019: Best Batman Movie + The Snyder Cut (Note: Special Episode Recorded at San Diego Comic-Con 2019)"	Hal Rudnick; Roxy Striar	(Note: Ed Greer, Dan Murrell, Eric Goldman, Kim Taylor-Foster, Joe Starr, Roth Cornet, Emma Fyffe, Ify Nwadiwe, Cameron Rice, Dorina Arellano, Spencer Gilbert and Coy Jandreau)	N/A	August 3, 2019
235	"Best Movie of Summer 2019?!"	Hal Rudnick; Joe Starr (Note: Starr filled in for Rudnick for 1st round.)	Mark Ellis; Spencer Gilbert; **Dan Murrell**	Lon Harris; Danielle Radford	September 7, 2019
236	"Best Joker Performance?"	Hal Rudnick	**Greg Alba**; Ed Greer; Dorina Arellano	Dan Murrell; Danielle Radford	October 12, 2019
237	"Best Animated Disney Villain?"	Hal Rudnick	Eric Goldman; **Vanessa Gritton**; Scott Mantz	Dan Murrell; Danielle Radford	November 21, 2019

=== 2020 ===
No.	Title	Host/Judge	Contestants (winner in bold)	Fact checker	Original release date
238	"2020 Oscars Movie Fights!"	Hal Rudnick	Spencer Gilbert; Roth Cornet; **Dan Murrell**	Lon Harris; Danielle Radford	February 10, 2020

=== 2026 ===
No.	Title	Host/Judge	Contestants (winner in bold)	Fact checker	Original release date
239	"We’re Back!"	Hal Rudnick	Spencer Gilbert; Mike Carlson; **Dan Murrell**	Emma Fyffe	February 13, 2026
240	"The REAL Best Picture"	Hal Rudnick	Scott Mantz; **Mark Ellis**; Lizzie Bennet	Emma Fyffe	March 16, 2026
241	"Project Hail Mary"	Hal Rudnick	**Coy Jandreau**; Eric Goldman; John Rocha	Spencer Gilbert	March 23, 2026
242	"Video Game Movies"	Hal Rudnick	Nick Apostolides; Spencer Gilbert; **Meghan Camarena**	Tiffany Tse	April 6, 2026
243	"The Worst Movie Ever Made?"	Hal Rudnick	Cinema Joe; **Ed Greer**; Nicole Tompkins	Spencer Gilbert	May 4, 2026
244	"How Would You Save Star Wars?"	Hal Rudnick	Ken Napzok; **Perri Nemiroff**; Steele Saunders	Master Fred	May 27, 2026
245	"How Bad Was Supergirl?"	Roxy Striar	**Juju Green**; Matt Ramos; Taya Miller	Spencer Gilbert	June 29, 2026
246	"Pitch a New Lord of the Rings?"	Hal Rudnick	Felicia Day; Joseph Scrimshaw; **Maude Garrett**	Spencer Gilbert	July 13, 2026
247	"Is The Odyssey Nolan’s Best Film?"	Hal Rudnick	Cinema Joe; Roth Cornet; **Dan Mintz**	Spencer Gilbert	July 20, 2026
248	"Dan Murrell Returns!"	Hal Rudnick	Joe Starr; **Dan Murrell**; Spencer Gilbert	Danielle Radford	September 21, 2026
249	"What's The Best Hand-to-Hand Fight Scene?"	Hal Rudnick	Spencer Gilbert; **Dan Murrell**; Juju Green	Danielle Radford	October 30, 2026
250	"What's The Scariest Movie Ever Made?"	Hal Rudnick	Casper Kelly; **James A. Janisse**; Eric Goldman	Rebecca Castaneda	November 6, 2026

== Top contestants ==
No.	Contestant	Wins	Appearances as Fighter	Win percentage	Notes	Total Appearances
1	Dan Murrell	45	63	71.4%	Incumbent Movie Fights Champion; 2-time Movie Fights Champion (successfully defended Belt ten times); Runner-up in the ninth Title Belt Match; 2-time San Diego Comic-Con Movie Fights Champion (2017 & 2018)	211
2	Mike Carlson	13	35	37.1%	Runner-up in the fourth, eighth and tenth Title Belt Matches	36
3	Spencer Gilbert	11	46	23.9%	San Diego Comic-Con Movie Fights Champion (2015); Runner-up in the third and fifth Title Belt Matches; Winner of Last Fighter Standing II; Former Movie Fights Champion	63
4	Marc Andreyko	9	21	42.9%		23
5	Hal Rudnick	8	29	27.6%	Hal retroactively won the first fight (not reflected in win column)	120
6	Coy Jandreau	8	23	34.8%	San Diego Comic-Con Movie Fights Champion (2019)	23
7	Alicia Malone	8	17	47.1%	Runner-up in the second and seventh Title Belt Matches; Winner of Last Fighter Standing	32
8	Joe Starr	6	27	22.2%		42
9	Mark Ellis	6	16	37.5%	Runner-up in the first Title Belt Match	17
10	JTE	6	14	42.9%	Finished Third place in the thirteenth Title Belt Match	14
11	Nick Mundy	5	21	23.8%	Finished Third place in the third Title Belt Match	26
12	Ed Greer	5	18	27.8%	Runner-up in the eleventh Title Belt Match	19
13	Greg Alba (Note: Competed as Ryan Right for one episode)	5	12	41.7%	Runner-up in the twelfth Title Belt Match	12
14	Clarke Wolfe	5	8	62.5%		9
15	Scott Mantz	4	19	21.1%		20
16	Ken Napzok	4	13	30.8%	Drunk Movie Fights Champion	21
17	Sasha Perl-Raver	4	13	30.8%	Runner-up in the thirteenth Title Belt Match	14
18	Cucumber	4	6	66.7%	Former Movie Fights Champion; Finished Third place in the eleventh Title Belt Match	7
19	Max Landis	4	6	66.7%	San Diego Comic-Con Movie Fights Champion (2016); Lost sixth Title Belt Match	7
20	D.J. Wooldridge	3	7	42.9%		7
21	Tony Revolori	3	7	42.9%		7
22	Jason Inman	3	6	50.0%	Finished Third place in the first Title Belt Match	15
23	Perri Nemiroff	3	6	33.3%		6
24	Amy Nicholson	3	6	50.0%	Finished Third place in the fourth Title Belt Match	6
25	Trisha Hershberger	2	11	18.2%		12
26	Lon Harris	2	10	20.0%		47
27	Kristian Harloff	2	10	20.0%		13
28	Emma Fyffe	2	9	22.2%		12
29	Danielle Radford	2	8	25.0%		81
30	Ify Nwadiwe	2	6	33.3%		6
31	Chris Stuckmann	2	5	40.0%	Wizard World Comic-Con Movie Fights Champion (2015); Finished Third place in the fifth Title Belt Match	6

This is the list of contestants with 5 or more appearances who have at least 2 wins among all types of competitions, excluding the episode that aired during the Schmoes Know show between episodes 10 and 11 and the Screen Junkies Plus exclusive fight that aired between episodes 95 and 96. Neither of these fights have statistics recorded, and they do not appear in the list of episodes above.

This list does not count Hal's official win for episode 1. Nor does it count Dan's filling in for four rounds for Mike Carlson (episode 69) or one round for Bryan Chambers (episode 25) as an appearance as a fighter.

Further, the list does not count fighter appearances for episode 110 for Alicia and Dan, who competed in a Speed Round after Alicia activated the Show Stopper.

== Title belt match history ==
Match No.	Winner	Runner-up	Third place	Notes	Final score
1	Dan Murrell	Mark Ellis	Jason Inman		6–5–1
2	Dan Murrell	Alicia Malone	Comic Book Girl 19		6–3–2
3	Dan Murrell	Spencer Gilbert	Nick Mundy	Spencer defeated Nick in a tiebreaker to advance to the speed round. This was not counted in the match's score.	6–2–2
4	Dan Murrell	Mike Carlson	Amy Nicholson	Live Recorded Episode	6–4–1
5	Dan Murrell	Spencer Gilbert	Chris Stuckmann	Dan defends against those who have beaten him at Cons. Chris was eliminated as part of a three-way tiebreaker to determine who went to the speed round.	5–2–2
6	Dan Murrell	Max Landis	N/A	Max conceded 1 point	6–3
7	Dan Murrell	Alicia Malone	N/A	Alicia activated the Show Stopper before the Speed Round of episode 110	3–2
8	Dan Murrell	Mike Carlson	N/A		6–2
9	Spencer Gilbert	Dan Murrell	N/A	Spencer activated the Show Stopper after Dan successfully defended the title against Mike on episode 144. Spencer defeated Dan to become new champion. This victory was controversial because Spencer was allowed to fight using Star Wars: Episode VI – Return of the Jedi for the question "Best movie with 6 words in the title" despite protests from the studio audience and Murrell himself.	3–2
10	Cucumber	Chunk	Mike Carlson	Cucumber won the vacant title during the Movie Fights Extravaganza.	1–0–0
11	Dan Murrell	Ed Greer	Cucumber		4–2–0
12	Dan Murrell	Greg Alba	N/A		4–1
13	Dan Murrell	Sasha Perl-Raver	JTE		3–1–0
