= Totally Killer =

2023 film by Nahnatchka Khan

- Release poster
- Directed by: Nahnatchka Khan
- Screenplay by: David Matalon; Sasha Perl-Raver; Jen D'Angelo
- Story by: David Matalon; Sasha Perl-Raver
- Produced by: Jason Blum; Adam Hendricks; Greg Gilreath
- Starring: Kiernan Shipka; Olivia Holt; Lochlyn Munro; Julie Bowen
- Cinematography: Judd Overton
- Edited by: Jeremy Cohen
- Music by: Michael Andrews
- Production companies: Amazon MGM Studios; Blumhouse Television; Divide/Conquer
- Distributed by: Amazon Prime Video
- Release dates: September 28, 2023 (Fantastic Fest); October 6, 2023 (United States)
- Running time: 106 minutes
- Country: United States
- Language: English

Totally Killer is a 2023 American science-fiction slasher comedy film directed by Nahnatchka Khan from a screenplay by David Matalon, Sasha Perl-Raver, and Jen D'Angelo, and a screen story by Matalon and Perl-Raver. Produced by Jason Blum, under his Blumhouse Television banner, and Adam Hendricks and Greg Gilreath under their Divide/Conquer banner, it stars Kiernan Shipka, Olivia Holt, Lochlyn Munro, and Julie Bowen. The story follows Jamie (Shipka) who, after her mother is murdered by the same Sweet 16 Killer who went on a murder spree over 30 years earlier, travels back in time to 1987, where she pairs up with her mother to catch the killer during his original spree and return to her timeline before she is trapped in the past forever.

Totally Killer premiered at Fantastic Fest on September 28, 2023, and was released on Amazon Prime Video on October 6, 2023. The film received generally positive reviews from critics.

== Plot ==
In the small town of Vernon, on October 27, 29, and 31, 1987, teenage girls Tiffany, Marisa, and Heather were killed by the Sweet 16 Killer, each having been stabbed 16 times on the nights of their 16th birthdays.

In the present day of 2023, teenager Jamie Hughes goes to a concert with her friend Amelia on Halloween night while her mother, Pam, stays at home. Pam used to be friends with the three victims of the Sweet 16 Killer, and while handing out candy, she is attacked by the killer, who stabs her to death. As Jamie grieves Pam's death, she helps Amelia put the finishing touches on a time machine she created, using ideas from her mother, Lauren's, high school notebook. Jamie is approached by reporter Chris Dubasage, who tells her that 1987 Pam had received a note from the killer that she kept secret: "You're next, one day."

That night, Jamie is chased by the killer and hides in the time machine, which activates and sends her to 1987. She realizes that if she stops the Sweet 16 Killer's original spree, she can save Pam's life. Masquerading as an exchange student from Canada, she discovers that Pam and her friends are despised by everyone in the town for being cruel bullies. Jamie gets help from two students – Amelia's mother, Lauren, who believes her part in Jamie's time travel, and Doug, her school's present-day principal. Jamie infiltrates a party hosted by Tiffany, but is unable to stop her murder. Jamie bonds with Pam by saying she's a psychic who sees the upcoming murders, later sharing this with the group. Jamie convinces them to leave town for the weekend, but Marisa drives them to the cabin where Marisa was killed. As Jamie works to protect Marisa, Heather is murdered instead, changing the timeline.

On Halloween night, the group reconvenes at the amusement park while Lauren works on turning a popular attraction into a makeshift time machine for Jamie to return home. In 2023, Chris helps Amelia build another time machine as they realize the timeline is changing. The 1987 group lure the Sweet 16 Killer into a haunted house where he attacks them, only to be impaled by Kara, the future town sheriff, with a scythe. Doug is revealed as the killer, seeking revenge on the group for bullying to death his girlfriend, Trish. While Marisa, Tiffany, and Heather got Trish drunk then let her drive away, Pam was not present. As Jamie wonders why Pam received the note, a second killer appears and slits Marisa's throat, completing the original murders of Trish's killers.

The second killer chases Jamie, killing Chris' father along the way. They face off in Lauren's time machine as it activates, and the killer is revealed to be 2023 Chris, who used Amelia's second time machine. Chris copycat murdered Pam and forged the note in order to generate more content for his podcast. The two fight and Jamie kicks him into the spinning machine, killing him. Upon returning to 2023, she finds that Pam is still alive. However, Jamie's intervention in the past has resulted in an alternate future in which her parents got together earlier than they had originally, resulting in her having a 34-year-old brother, named Jamie, with her revised name being Colette. Adult Lauren gives her a notebook detailing everything that had changed from her intervention: Lauren and Pam became best friends; her new brother has a husband and a daughter; Randy, her old coach, is now the school principal; Kara became chief of police; Trish's brother, originally the 2023 school groundskeeper, instead started a video game company and an anti-bullying association; and Chris, traumatized by seeing his father murdered, became a monk at a monastery in India.

== Cast ==
- Kiernan Shipka as Jamie Hughes / Colette
- Olivia Holt as teen Pam Miller
  - Julie Bowen as adult Pam Hughes (née Miller)
- Charlie Gillespie as teen Blake Hughes
  - Lochlyn Munro as adult Blake Hughes
- Troy L. Johnson as a teen Lauren Creston
  - Kimberly Huie as adult Lauren Creston
- Liana Liberato as Tiffany Clark
- Kelcey Mawema as Amelia Creston
- Stephi Chin-Salvo as Marisa Song
- Anna Diaz as Heather Hernandez
- Ella Choi as teen Kara Lim
  - Patti Kim as adult Kara Lim
- Jeremy Monn-Djasngar as teen Randy Finkle
  - Tommy Europe as adult Randy Finkle
- Nathaniel Appiah as teen Doug Summers
  - Conrad Coates as adult Doug Summers
- Nicholas Lloyd as teen Chris Dubusage
  - Jonathan Potts as adult Chris Dubusage
- Randall Park as Sheriff Dennis Lim
- Zach Gibson as teen Lurch
  - Brendan O'Brien as adult Lurch
- Andy Thompson as Mr. Parr

== Production ==
In May 2022, Amazon Studios and Blumhouse Television announced Totally Killer which is being directed by Nahnatchka Khan and written by Jen D'Angelo and David Matalon and Sasha Perl-Raver. Kiernan Shipka, Olivia Holt, Julie Bowen, and Randall Park were cast in leading roles. It is produced by Jason Blum, under his Blumhouse Television banner, and Adam Hendricks and Greg Gilreath under their Divide/Conquer banner.

Principal photography took place from May 12 to June 23, 2022, in Vancouver, British Columbia.

== Release ==
Totally Killer premiered at Fantastic Fest on September 28, 2023. It was released on Amazon Prime Video on October 6, 2023.

== Reception ==
=== Critical response ===
On the review aggregator website Rotten Tomatoes, 85% of 110 critics' reviews are positive, with an average rating of 6.5/10. The website's consensus reads: "Totally Killer may not take full advantage of its promising conceit, but this time-traveling horror/sci-fi mashup is still enjoyable overall." Metacritic, which uses a weighted average, assigned the film a score of 62 out of 100, based on 17 critics, indicating "generally favorable" reviews.

Christy Lemire, writing for RogerEbert.com, gave the film 3 out of 4 stars. She called it "a fish-out-of-water comedy filled with amusing one-liners combined with time-travel sci-fi that actually kinda makes sense." Michael Nordine of Variety wrote, "In trying to break the tension with humor, too many horror movies undercut their emotional stakes by instead being glib, a pitfall Totally Killer mostly manages to avoid." The A.V. Club's Matthew Jackson gave it a B grade, saying the film was "not necessarily a new slasher classic, but it is the kind of film horror devotees can happily kick back and enjoy on a cozy Friday night in October, and that's a particular achievement all its own."

Tatat Bunnag of the Bangkok Post said that director Nahnatchka Khan "successfully captures the vibrant atmosphere and fluorescent colours of the 80s, while also deftly highlighting the problematic attitudes and behaviours of that era when viewed through today's lens."

Benjamin Lee of The Guardian gave the film 2 out of 5 stars, writing, "Its time-travel slasher plot cribs elements from all and relies on enthusiasm over invention to keep us entertained, a gamble that only works in brief bursts." The New York Times' Brandon Yu wrote, "Its '80s throwback setting is short on color and life, and its slasher elements lack the choreographic or cinematic oomph to induce any terror, or even tension." Dominic Baez of The Seattle Times gave it 1.5 out of 4 stars, saying it "wants to make a joke at its source material's expense, but all it ever accomplishes is making you want to watch those classics instead."

== See also ==
- 1980s nostalgia
- List of films set around Halloween
