= Alicia Malone =

Australian–American television host (born 1981)

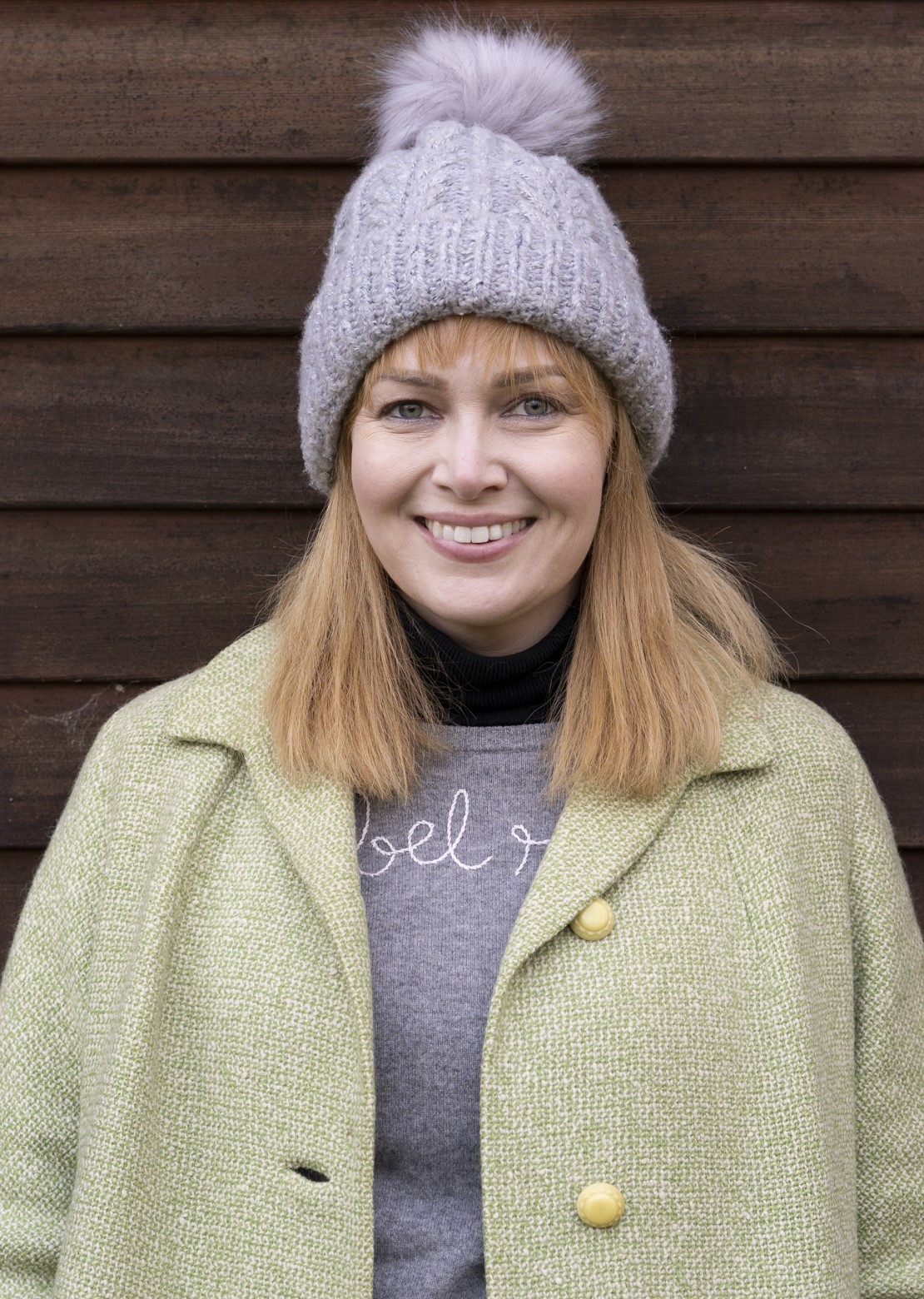
- Malone in 2021
- Born: 4 September 1981 (age 45); Canberra, Australia
- Occupations: Television host; author; film journalist
- Years active: 2000–present
- Employers: Warner Bros. Discovery (2018–2026); Skydance Corporation (2026–present)

Alicia Maree Malone (born 4 September 1981) is an Australian–American author and television host for Turner Classic Movies (TCM).

Born in Canberra, Malone became a cinephile of classic Hollywood films at a young age. After graduating from Canberra Girls Grammar School, she moved to Sydney intending to work in television. In 2000, she was hired by the Channel Seven television station as a teleprompter operator, and later worked in numerous production roles. In 2006, Malone was hired by Movie Network Channels as a producer and editor. With the support of a close friend and colleague, she began hosting film-related programming, and served as a red carpet interviewer at Australian film premieres.

In 2010, Malone moved to Los Angeles to work in American television. She was hired by her native Australian Today show as a press junket journalist, whereby she held media interviews with numerous celebrities. Meanwhile, she hosted several podcasts and wrote two non-fiction books, exploring the involvement of women in film. In 2016, she was hired as a host for the now-defunct streaming service FilmStruck, which led to her hiring as a full-time host for Turner Classic Movies.

== Early life ==
Malone was born in Canberra, Australia. When she was three years old, she watched The NeverEnding Story (1984) in a movie theater with her mother and sisters. During the film, the character Atreyu tries to save his beloved horse Artax, which made her very emotional. She remembered, "I started crying and yelling ... I made so much noise my mum had to take me out of the theater." She has credited the 1953 film Gentlemen Prefer Blondes as her introduction to classic cinema, becoming an avid admirer of Marilyn Monroe. To advance her knowledge into cinema, at a young age, she read editions of Leonard Maltin's Movie Guide and watched films presented on Bill Collins' Golden Years of Hollywood program on Network 10.

While studying at Canberra Girls Grammar School, Malone started a film club, intending to convince her classmates to appreciate classic cinema. After graduating, she chose not to attend a university but instead moved to Sydney, intending to work in television. There, she applied and won a half scholarship to study television at a technical college. Meanwhile, she worked at a Video Ezy rental store, where she was hired on the spot, and advised unsuspecting customers which films they should rent.

== Career ==
=== Australian television (2000–2010) ===
After an acquaintance had suggested her, Malone began working for the Channel Seven television station, which was broadcasting the Sydney 2000 Summer Olympics, as a teleprompter operator. Malone stayed at Channel Seven for six years, working a variety of production roles for Seven News and Sunrise. Then, she was hired as a producer and editor for the premium television station Movie Network Channels, which broadcast Movie One, Movie Extra and Movie Greats. She produced and edited PS and Redspace for Movie One, and Movie Juice, a weekly movie television program on Movie Extra.

While there, Malone reflected: "When I saw the fun tasks the TV hosts got to do on the channel—interviewing filmmakers, reviewing movies—I knew that's what I wanted to do. It was like my film club or video store experiences on a much larger level." She stated her request to Renée Brack, a friend and colleague of hers, who agreed to have Malone do live red carpet events. As the Movie Network's red carpet reporter, she covered Australian film premieres and award shows for the channels. Furthermore, Malone hosted Trailer Park, based on her original pitch, which featured exclusive movie trailers, and was a film reporter for Channel Seven's The Morning Show.

=== Film journalist (2010–present) ===
In 2010, Malone moved to Los Angeles and was permitted an O visa, which allowed her to work only in television. Her first work in the United States was doing press junkets for the Australian Today show. During these events, she became known for hugging the celebrities she had interviewed. She recalled: "...you know, you're not supposed to touch these celebrities, they're kind of the untouchable — some of them you can't even shake hands with. So I thought a hug would be a great way to break the ice, to make it be like, we're both humans ... and then it became kind of a theme." After several years of press junkets, Malone returned to broadcast television, appearing as a "film expert" on American television networks, including CNN, MSNBC, and NBC's Today.

On 20 September 2015, Malone gave her first TEDx Talk titled #GirlsInFilm at TEDxSanJuanIsland. In this talk, she discussed the underrepresentation of women in Hollywood. On 13 May 2017, she gave her second seminar at TEDxBend titled Female Directors in Hollywood & Impact of Movies Made From 1 Perspective. There, she recounted the history of female film directors in Hollywood, and how more than one type of story can be told.

In October 2016, Malone launched and hosted the web series Indie Movie Guide for Fandango. As a Fandango correspondent, she reviewed independent films in limited release and covered numerous film festivals, including the Cannes Film Festival, Sundance, Telluride, and South by Southwest (SXSW). At the 2018 SXSW Conference, Malone moderated an all-female panel discussion titled "The Female Voices of Film Twitter," with film critics Monica Castillo, Jacqueline Coley, Amy Nicholson, and Jen Yamato. At the 2019 SXSW Conference, she moderated another panel discussion inspired by her book The Female Gaze, discussing with three other women-directors about their careers, subverting the male gaze, and whether women-directors are telling authentic stories. In 2019, she began hosting the video series Reel Destinations for Focus Features, exploring the actual locations of their films.

Since the series' premiere in January 2022 on HBO, Malone and Tom Meyers (of The Bowery Boys podcast) have hosted The Official Gilded Age Podcast, with each installment discussing the previously aired episode and sharing exclusive behind-the-scenes interviews with the cast and filmmakers.

=== Turner Classic Movies (2018–present) ===
One night, in 2010, after channel-surfing on cable television, Malone wrote down a particular goal in mind to become a host for Turner Classic Movies (TCM). In 2014, she co-hosted the podcast series Profiles with Malone and Mantz, alongside Scott Mantz for Popcorn Talk Network. There, Keven Undergaro, the co-founder of Popcorn Talk, met privately with Malone, where she mentioned her dream goal. Undergaro knew Darcy Hettrich, who worked as TCM's head of talent. Nervous at the prospect, Malone spent a year sharpening her skills before submitting a showreel of herself discussing classic films. At the time, TCM was partnering with The Criterion Collection on FilmStruck, a film streaming service. In 2016, she was hired to host video introductions for FilmStruck. She also hosted The FilmStruck Podcast interviewing filmmakers whose films were featured on the service. In November 2018, FilmStruck was shut down by WarnerMedia, under the ownership of AT&T, to streamline business operations.

In 2018, Malone was hired as a full-time host for Turner Classic Movies, making her first official appearance on 4 March. She has stated that before filming her segments, she researches and writes her own introductions. Malone further added: "There are fact checkers and producers that review things but they're pretty good at not suppressing what we say." In 2019, she was made the current host of the TCM Imports programming block on late Sunday nights. As of 2026, Malone hosts the afternoon lineup on Sundays and the primetime lineup on Tuesdays.

In the fall of 2020, Malone and her colleague Jacqueline Stewart co-hosted an original limited interview series titled Women Make Film, inspired by Mark Cousins' documentary of the same title. Malone told Entertainment Weekly this was the first time she felt free to professionally discuss women in film to the degree she wanted: "Usually in my previous jobs I've been told, 'Shh, don't talk so much about women. You've got to broaden things out; otherwise, the men won't listen.' I love that at TCM I've been given free rein, and Jacqueline as well, to speak about any subject we like with these special guests." During the summer of 2022, Malone hosted an original limited series Follow the Thread, interviewing fashion and costume designers about men and women's cinematic fashion trends from the 19th to the mid-late 20th century.

=== Author ===
While reading the book Movie-Made America by Robert Sklar, Malone learned that there were more opportunities for women during the first few decades of American cinema than any other industry at the time. She researched the topic and interviewed prominent figures about the historical involvement and underrepresentation of women in the Hollywood film industry. In 2017, Malone published her first book, Backwards and in Heels. She followed up with her second book, The Female Gaze, in response to readers who asked how they could support working female filmmakers.

In 2022, Malone published her third book, Girls on Film, which details her personal history and career and how her love for classic cinema has shaped her worldview. Her fourth book, titled TCM Imports: Timeless Favorites and Hidden Gems of World Cinema, was released on 22 April 2025. The book details fifty international films and arranges them pertaining to the four seasons.

In 2026, Malone published her debut novel, Murder at the Movies, which is expected to be the first installment of a Movie Palace Mystery series. Inspired by her real-life relocation to the East Coast of the United States, the novel centers on amateur sleuth Audrey Sullivan, who inherits her grandmother's bankrupt movie theater where a murder happens during a film screening.

== Personal life ==
Malone lives in Midcoast Maine, having relocated there from Los Angeles during the COVID-19 pandemic. There, she joined the board of directors for the Strand Theatre, a historic movie theatre in Rockland.

== Books ==
- Backwards and in Heels: The Past, Present And Future Of Women Working In Film. Coral Gables, Florida: Mango Publishing. 2017. ISBN 978-1-63353-618-0.
- The Female Gaze: Essential Movies Made by Women. Coral Gables, Florida: Mango Publishing. 2018. ISBN 978-1-63353-837-5.
- Girls on Film: Lessons From a Life of Watching Women in Movies. Coral Gables, Florida: Mango Publishing. 2022. ISBN 978-1-64250-656-3.
- TCM Imports: Timeless Favorites and Hidden Gems of World Cinema. New York: Running Press. 2025. ISBN 978-0-762-48848-3.
- Film Fashion Icons: A Deck and Guidebook of Style Inspiration from Classic Hollywood. New York: Running Press. 2025. ISBN 978-0-762-48850-6.
- Murder at the Movies: A Movie Palace Mystery. New York: Running Press. 2026. ISBN 979-8-894-14360-6.
