= TriStar Pictures =

American film production company

TriStar Pictures, Inc.
- Print logo used since 2015
- Formerly: Nova Pictures (1982–1983); Tri-Star Pictures, Inc. (1983–1991)
- Type: Subsidiary
- Industry: Film
- Founded: March 2, 1982; 44 years ago, Burbank, California, U.S.
- Founders: Victor Kaufman; David Matalon
- Headquarters: 10202 West Washington Boulevard, Culver City, California, U.S.
- Area served: Worldwide
- Key people: Nicole Brown (president)
- Products: Motion pictures
- Owner: Columbia Pictures (1982–1987); CBS (1982–1985); HBO (1982–1985)
- Parent: Sony Pictures (1989–present)
- Subsidiaries: TriStar Productions

TriStar Pictures, Inc., spelled as Tri-Star until 1991, is an American film production company that is part of the Sony Pictures Motion Picture Group, a division of Sony Pictures, which is part of the Japanese conglomerate Sony Group Corporation. The company was founded on March 2, 1982, as Nova Pictures, a joint venture of Columbia Pictures, CBS, and HBO, whose video units handled video, broadcast, and pay cable rights to its products. It was renamed a year later to Tri-Star to avoid confusion with the PBS series Nova.

Among its notable releases are Terminator 2: Judgment Day, Basic Instinct, Rambo: First Blood Part II (all of these movies are produced by Carolco Pictures), and Hollywood’s first Godzilla. The company scored box-office hits with modestly budgeted fare in the 1980s. It also cut fortuitous distribution deals with the Producers Sales Organization, Carolco Pictures and the Taft Entertainment Group; acquired Loews Theatres; and formed a television arm. Among the various hits TriStar scored on its own during the decade were About Last Night, The Muppets Take Manhattan, Real Genius, Nothing in Common, Peggy Sue Got Married, The Principal, Look Who's Talking and Steel Magnolias.

Columbia Pictures bought CBS' stake in the joint venture on November 15, 1985, and HBO's stake in 1986. On December 21, 1987, Tri-Star Pictures was merged with Columbia Pictures Entertainment by the Coca-Cola Company, which owned 80% of CPE. In January 1988, CPE's stocks somewhat fell, and Coca-Cola decreased its shares in CPE to 49%. On April 13, 1988, the Tri-Star Pictures label was revived. On November 8, 1989, Sony Corporation of Japan acquired Columbia Pictures Entertainment for $3.4 billion. On August 7, 1991, under Sony Pictures Entertainment, the hyphen was officially removed from the name of the studio.

During the 1990s, TriStar operated autonomously from Columbia. Although its products were mostly indistinguishable from that of its sister studio, it soon scored a string of hits at the box office with such films as Sleepless in Seattle, Philadelphia, The Mirror Has Two Faces, Jerry Maguire, As Good as It Gets, Bugsy and it also scored a major video hit with Danny DeVito's Matilda. However, in 1998, the company fell on hard times following the box-office disappointment of its production Godzilla. Sony quickly responded by merging the studio with Columbia. The TriStar name was subsequently used by Sony on a very limited basis until 2004, when the company decided to turn the studio into a genre label that specialized in acquisitions.

TriStar Pictures is currently one of the five live-action labels of the Sony Pictures Motion Picture Group, alongside Columbia Pictures, Screen Gems, Sony Pictures Classics, and 3000 Pictures.

TriStar Productions, Inc.
- Type: Joint venture
- Industry: Film; Television
- Founded: August 9, 2013; 13 years ago
- Founder: Thomas Rothman (also chairman and co-owner)
- Headquarters: also 10202 W. Wash. Blvd.
- Key people: Lindsay Sloane (SVP, TV); David Beaubaire (EVP, film); Nicole Brown (SVP, film)
- Products: Motion pictures; Television production

In 2013, Sony formed TriStar Productions, Inc. (TSP), an American film and television production company, a division of TriStar Pictures and a joint venture between Sony Pictures Entertainment (SPE) and former 20th Century Fox chairman Tom Rothman. TriStar Pictures is currently being used as a vehicle for distribution of films from that new entity and others from Sony Pictures.

Founded on August 9, 2013, the company shares its name and logo with the current TriStar Pictures distribution label of Sony Pictures, under which TriStar Productions' films will be released joining the other titles released from Sony Pictures Worldwide Acquisitions. The television programming, however, will be produced for Sony Pictures Television. The TriStar name was selected as Rothman considers himself a film buff, giving the company its historical name, and counting on the good will of the Hollywood creative types to give the unit an edge.

== History ==
=== Early era (1982–1987) ===
The concept for Tri-Star Pictures can be traced to Victor Kaufman, a senior executive of Columbia Pictures (then a subsidiary of the Coca-Cola Company), who convinced Columbia, Time Inc.’s HBO, and CBS to share resources and split the ever-growing costs of making movies, leading to the creation of a new joint venture on March 2, 1982. On May 16, 1983, it was given the name Tri-Star Pictures (when the new company was formed and did not have an official name, the press used the code-name "Nova", but the name could not be obtained as it was being used as the title for the PBS science series). Tri-Star embarked on a 12 to 18 feature film slate per year, with a combined budget of $70 to $80 million and signed producer Walter Colbenz as vice president of the Tri-Star feature film studio, and signed initial development deals with director John Schlesinger and producers Jeffrey Walker and Michael Walker. Tri-Star's first project to roll out was The Muppets Take Manhattan.

On May 11, 1984, Tri-Star's first produced film was released, The Natural starring Robert Redford. Tri-Star's first release, however, was the film, Where the Boys Are '84; a 1984 remake of the 1960 Metro-Goldwyn-Mayer (MGM) picture, Where the Boys Are that was co-distributed on behalf of ITC Entertainment after Universal rejected it; the film was a commercial flop.

Many of Tri-Star's productions were released on VHS by RCA/Columbia Pictures Home Video, HBO/Cannon Video, or CBS/Fox Video. In addition, HBO owned exclusive cable distribution rights to the films, with broadcast television licenses going to CBS.

On May 8, 1984, Tri-Star Pictures secured North American distribution rights for the film Supergirl from Warner Bros., which enabled the film to be ready for distribution by Christmas 1984. On May 15, 1984, the studio hit big through its association with Carolco Pictures, with the release of Rambo: First Blood Part II, which eventually became a smash hit for the studio the following year. The company also partnered with Producers Sales Organization to handle theatrical distribution of the PSO titles, while both Tri-Star and Columbia struck a deal for film financing with Delphi Film Associates.

CBS dropped out of the Tri-Star venture in November 1985. HBO also dropped out of the venture and sold half of its shares to Columbia Pictures following a month. Despite the changes in majority ownership, Tri-Star continued ambition-laden expansion plans. Chief among these plans was an expansion of their successful relationship with Carolco; a new extension of their pre-existing deal included Tri-Star gaining theatrical distribution rights to various Carolco projects, including Rambo III and Air America; Carolco retained all foreign, cable, television and videocassette rights. Taft/Barish Productions, a joint venture of Taft Broadcasting and Keith Barish Productions, signed a $200 million domestic distribution deal with Tri-Star (much like Carolco, Taft/Barish retained non-theatrical and ancillary distribution rights). Of the four films to emerge from this pact, only The Running Man would become a major success.

Another avenue of expansion was acquiring the storied Loews Theaters chain of cineplexes in October 1986 for $300 million, after a deal to purchase United Artists Theaters from Tele-Communications, Inc. did not come to fruition. At the time, Loews had 260 theaters in six states.

1987 was another ambitious year for Tri-Star; plans were in place to take Tri-Star from a relatively new, untested film company into a major film studio. Components of these plans included the formation of TriStar Television, and joining forces with Stephen J. Cannell Productions and Witt/Thomas/Harris Productions to create a television distribution company known as TeleVentures; they also proposed forming their own home video label, Tri-Star Video, taking over from the trio of distributors (RCA/Columbia, CBS/Fox and HBO/Cannon). A full-on international distribution arm was also in the planning stages. Another distribution deal was signed by Tri-Star and Hemdale Film Corporation in September 1987, but only one film, High Tide, would result from that deal.

=== Columbia Pictures Entertainment era (1987–1989) ===
The Coca-Cola Company boosted its stake in Tri-Star to 29.3% that September. That December, following several high-profile flops (including Ishtar), Coca-Cola began a plan to get out of the media industry; Tri-Star Pictures, Inc. was renamed as Columbia Pictures Entertainment, Inc., and Coca-Cola sold its entertainment business to Tri-Star for $3.1 billion. Coca-Cola then planned to reduce its holdings in the new company to 49%. Both studios continued to produce and distribute films under their separate names.

As a result, Tri-Star's television division was consolidated into a single operating entity with Columbia/Embassy Television and Coca-Cola Television to form a new incarnation of Columbia Pictures Television. Merv Griffin Enterprises would continue to operate separately. Similarly, Tri-Star's nascent video division was absorbed into RCA/Columbia Pictures Home Video.

=== Sony era (1989–present) ===
In 1989, Columbia Pictures Entertainment, Inc. was acquired by Japanese conglomerate Sony Corporation, which merged Columbia and Tri-Star, but continued to use the separate labels. On July 11, 1990, Tri-Star Pictures dissolved and sold its venture in TeleVentures to Stephen J. Cannell Productions and TeleVentures became Cannell Distribution Co. Most of the series and the Tri-Star film packages that were distributed by TeleVentures were transferred to Columbia Pictures Television Distribution. Sony Pictures Entertainment later revived TriStar Television as a television production banner in 1991 (by way of acquiring rights to shows from New World Television) and merged with its sister television studio Columbia Pictures Television (CPT) to form Columbia TriStar Television (CTT) on February 21, 1994. Both studios continued to operate separately under the CTT umbrella until TriStar Television folded in 1999 and CPT folded in 2001.

In addition to its own slate, TriStar Pictures was the theatrical distributor for many films produced by Carolco Pictures (the rights to only one of its films, Cliffhanger, has been retained by TriStar). TriStar Pictures also theatrically distributed some FilmDistrict films. In 1992, TriStar Pictures, along with Japan Satellite Broadcasting signed an agreement with The IndieProd Company to distribute movies produced by IndieProd in order to fill the void left by Carolco, whose deal with TriStar Pictures was on the verge of expiring amid financial troubles.

Around summer 1998, SPE merged Columbia and TriStar to form the Columbia TriStar Motion Picture Group, but just like Columbia Pictures Entertainment, both divisions continued producing and distributing films under their own names. Some of the movies slated to be released by TriStar Pictures, including Stepmom would go to Sony's flagship label Columbia Pictures following the merger.

TriStar was relaunched on May 13, 2004, as a marketing and acquisitions unit that had a "particular emphasis on genre films". Screen Gems' executive vice president Valerie Van Galder was tapped to run the revived studio after being dormant. However, the release of its 2013 film Elysium represented the label's first big-budget release since The Mask of Zorro in 1998.

The same year (2013), former 20th Century Fox co-chairman Tom Rothman joined Sony Pictures and created TriStar Productions as a joint venture with existing Sony Pictures executives. The new TriStar would develop, finance and produce up to four films per year, as well as television programming and acquisitions, starting on September 1. It was jointly announced on August 1, 2013, by Rothman, Michael Lynton, the CEO of Sony Entertainment and co-chairman and CEO of SPE, and Amy Pascal, co-chairwoman of SPE. Rothman would hold an equity share in the venture with the ability to bring in other outside investments. TriStar Productions' first deal was for the autobiography To Walk the Clouds, which is about Philippe Petit, a French high wire walker who walked between the Twin Towers in 1974 adapted into the 2015 film The Walk. Sony's TriStar Pictures unit is currently being retained for "other product, including titles from Sony Pictures Worldwide Acquisitions", and is distributing product from TriStar Productions.

In February 2015, it was announced that Rothman would replace Amy Pascal as chairman of Sony Pictures's Motion Picture Group. Rothman would continue to oversee the properties he greenlit at TriStar.

== Logo ==
Original Tri-Star logo used from 1984 until 1993 with the release of Cliffhanger.

The TriStar logo was used from 1993 to 2015. This logo (in its 2014 form) has an intentionally similar backdrop and wordmark to that of sister company Columbia Pictures.

TriStar's logo features the winged horse Pegasus (either stationary or flying across the screen). The idea came from executive Victor Kaufman and his family's interest in riding horses. The original logo was created with the assistance of Sydney Pollack, who was an adviser at Tri-Star. The horse in the original filmed logo was the same one used in Pollack's film The Electric Horseman.

== Filmography ==
=== Highest-grossing films ===
Rank	Title	Year	Worldwide gross
1	Terminator 2: Judgment Day	1991	$520,881,154
2	Resident Evil	2026	$416,330,024
3	Godzilla	1998	$379,014,294
4	Basic Instinct	1992	$352,927,224
5	As Good as It Gets	1997	$314,178,011
6	Hook	1991	$300,854,823
7	Rambo: First Blood Part II	1985	$300,400,432
8	My Best Friend's Wedding	1997	$299,288,605
9	Look Who's Talking	1989	$296,999,813
10	Elysium	2013	$286,140,700
11	Jerry Maguire	1996	$273,552,592
12	Jumanji	1995	$262,821,940
13	Total Recall	1990	$261,317,921
14	Cliffhanger	1993	$255,000,211
15	The Mask of Zorro	1998	$250,288,523
16	Sleepless in Seattle	1993	$227,799,884
17	Baby Driver	2017	$226,945,087
18	District 9	2009	$210,888,950
19	Philadelphia	1993	$206,678,440
20	Rambo III	1988	$189,015,611
21	Looper	2012	$176,506,819
22	Legends of the Fall	1994	$160,638,883
23	Starship Troopers	1997	$121,099,956
24	Pompeii	2014	$117,831,631
25	Mary Shelley's Frankenstein	1994	$112,006,296

=== Released by TriStar Productions ===
Film	Release date	Co-production	Box office	Distributor
Ricki and the Flash	August 7, 2015	Marc Platt Productions Badwill Entertainment and LStar Capital	$41 million	Sony Pictures Releasing
The Walk	September 30, 2015	ImageMovers	$61 million	Sony Pictures Releasing
The Lady in the Van	November 13, 2015	BBC Films and Sony Pictures Classics	$41 million	Sony Pictures Releasing
Billy Lynn's Long Halftime Walk	November 11, 2016	Studio 8, LStar Capital, Film4 Productions, Bona Film Group, The Ink Factory and Marc Platt Productions	$30 million	Sony Pictures Releasing
Happiest Season	November 25, 2020	eOne and Temple Hill Entertainment	$10 million	Sony Pictures Releasing

== See also ==
- Affirm Films
- Columbia Pictures
- Screen Gems
- Sony Pictures Classics
- Triumph Films
- Destination Films
