= Cody Decker =

American baseball player (born 1987)

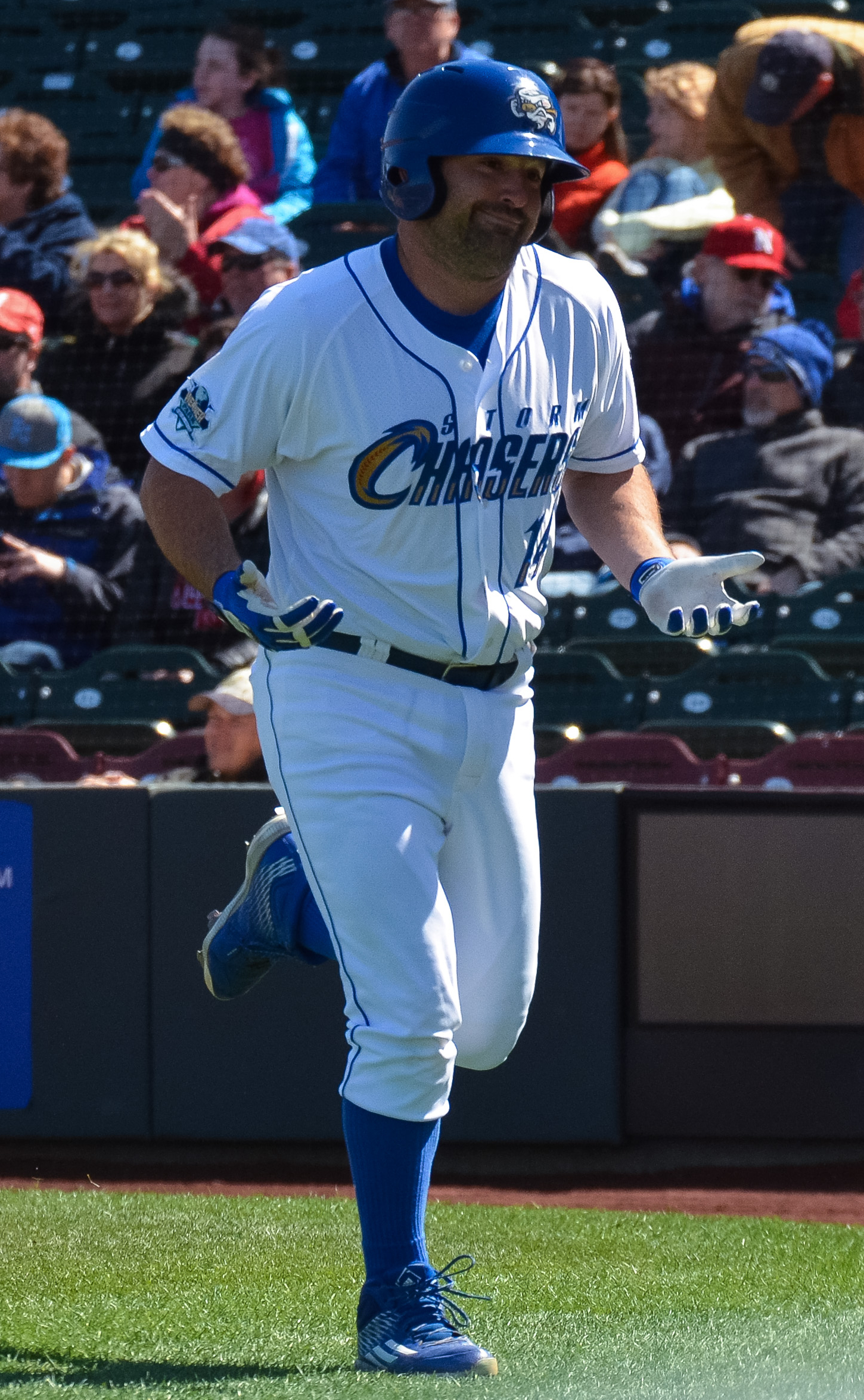
- Decker with the Omaha Storm Chasers in 2016
- First baseman / Outfielder
- Born: January 17, 1987 (age 39); Santa Monica, California, U.S.
- Batted: Right Threw: Right

MLB debut
- September 14, 2015, for the San Diego Padres

Last MLB appearance
- October 4, 2015, for the San Diego Padres

MLB statistics
- Batting average: .000
- Home runs: 0
- Runs batted in: 1
- Stats at Baseball Reference

Teams
- San Diego Padres (2015)

Cody Marshall Decker (born January 17, 1987) is an American former MiLB professional baseball outfielder. He had 11 at bats in Major League Baseball (MLB) for the San Diego Padres in 2015. A right-handed power hitter, he played first base, third base, left field, and could catch.

Playing for Santa Monica High School in California, Decker batted .490 and was Ocean League MVP his senior year. Playing college baseball for UCLA, he led the Pac-10 in home runs with 21 during his senior year in 2009, was a two-time All-Pac-10 selection, and ended his college career tied for 7th on UCLA's all-time home run list with 47.

Decker was drafted by the San Diego Padres in the 22nd round of the 2009 Major League Baseball draft. That summer he batted .354 and led the Arizona League (AZL) in home runs, RBIs (63, an AZL record), total bases (142, an AZL record), and slugging percentage (.717), and had the best fielding percentage for a first baseman. He was named the AZL Most Valuable Player and a Topps Post-Season All Star. In 2010, he was fourth in the California League in home runs (28) and seventh in RBIs (90). He was named an MiLB.com San Diego Organization All Star and MiLB.com Short-Season Best Hitter of the Year. In 2012, he was second in the Texas League in home runs (25) and third in slugging percentage (.540).

That fall, he played for the Israel national baseball team in the qualifying rounds of the 2013 World Baseball Classic. In 2014, Decker tied for fourth in the Pacific Coast League (PCL) in home runs (27), led all Padres minor leaguers in homers, and tied for third among Padres minor leaguers in RBIs (79). He was named a 2014 MiLB.com San Diego Organization All Star. In 2015, he was a PCL mid-season all-star, and an MiLB.com San Diego Organization All Star.

Decker made his major-league debut on September 14, 2015, after 2,566 at bats in 761 games over seven seasons in the minor leagues. At the time, his 154 home runs in the minors were the most by any MLB-affiliated minor-league player since he was drafted in 2009. He played for Team Israel at the 2017 World Baseball Classic.

Decker is currently the co-host of 'The Regulars' podcast on YouTube with sports journalist Tanya Ray Fox.

== Early life ==
Decker was born in Santa Monica, California, and is Jewish. His parents are Jay and Terri Decker, and he has an older brother (Jesse) and an older sister (Jenifer).

He attended Santa Monica High School in Santa Monica, California. There, playing first base, third base, and catcher he batted .490 over three seasons, and was a three-time All Bay League pick. In 2005, Decker was Ocean League MVP, Division IV Southern Section All-CIF first-team, and named to the Los Angeles Times All-South Bay/Westside Region team.

== College ==
Decker then attended UCLA on a baseball scholarship, where he majored in history, minored in film, and was a designated hitter, first baseman, and left fielder for the UCLA baseball team. In his sophomore year in 2007, he was third in the Pac-10 in home runs with 14. He led the Pac-10 in home runs with 21 during his senior year in 2009, and was third in walks (46), fifth in runs (55), and sixth in RBIs (53). Decker was the first hitter since Eric Byrnes with at least five homers in each of his four college seasons, and ended his college career tied with Ryan McGuire for seventh on UCLA's all-time home run list with 47. He was a two-time All-Pac-10 selection, in 2007 and 2009.

== Professional career ==
=== San Diego Padres ===
The San Diego Padres selected Decker in the 22nd round of the 2009 Major League Baseball draft. He said his after-tax signing bonus was $638.

In 2009, Decker batted .354 (third in the league) and led the Arizona League in home runs (15), RBIs (63-an Arizona League record), doubles (21), extra-base hits (39), total bases (142-an Arizona League record), slugging percentage (.717), and OPS (1.138), was second in hits (70), fourth in runs (46), and on-base percentage (.421), and had the best fielding percentage for a first baseman while playing for the Arizona League Padres. Decker was named the AZL Most Valuable Player (beating out Mike Trout), a Topps Short-Season/Rookie All Star, and Topps Post-Season All Star.

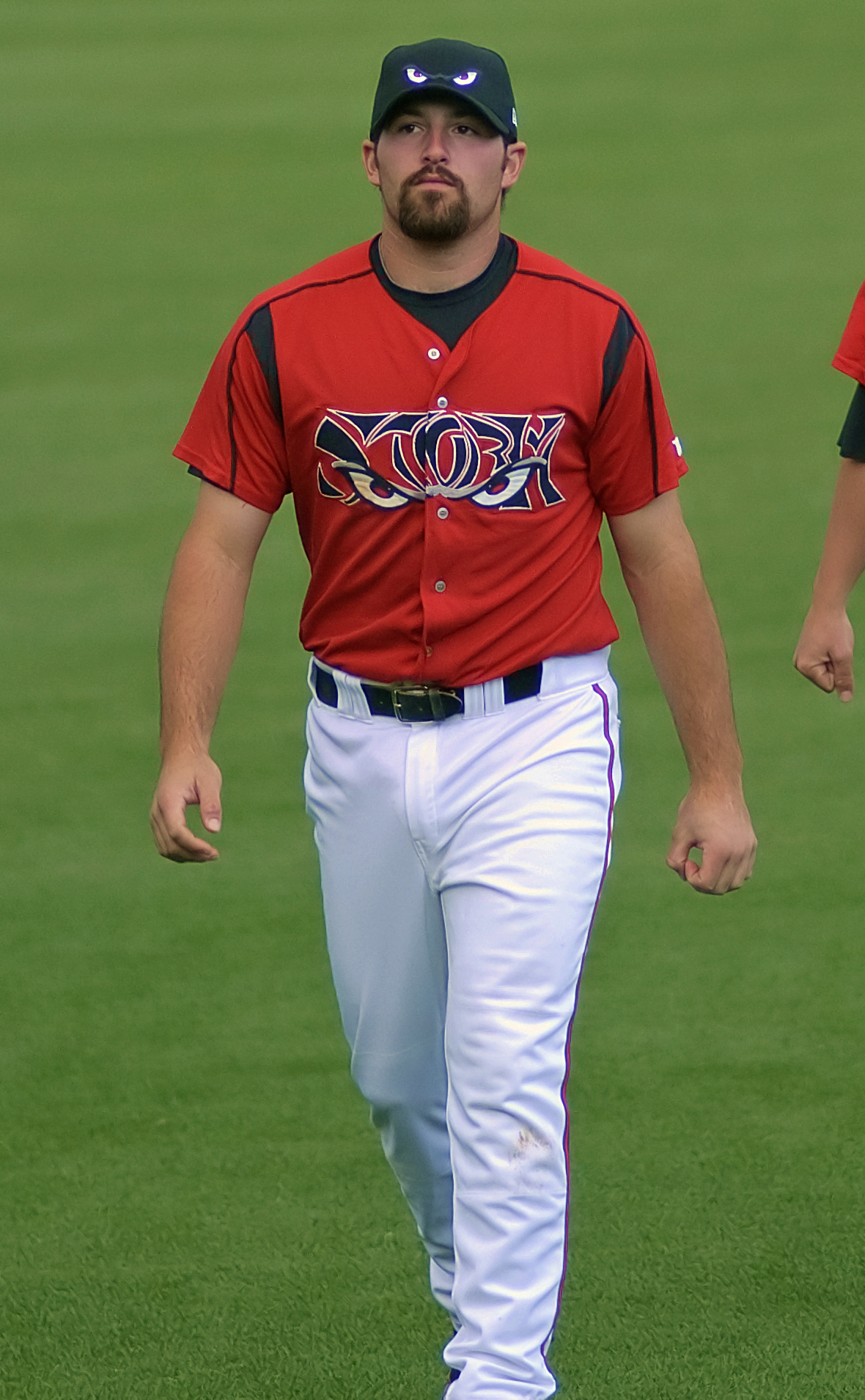
Decker with the Lake Elsinore Storm in 2010

In 2010, Decker was fourth in the California League in home runs (28; tied for the lead among Padres minor leaguers), sixth in doubles (35), seventh in RBIs (90; second-best among Padres minor leaguers), and ninth in walks (60), with the High-A Lake Elsinore Storm. He then was named an MiLB.com San Diego Organization All Star and MiLB.com Short-Season Best Hitter of the Year with the Arizona League Padres, and voted California League Player of the Week on August 30, 2010, with the Storm.

Decker missed nearly three months of the 2011 season with a severe third-degree right ankle sprain, though he hit 15 home runs in 59 games, 13 of them in Double–A.

In 2012, Decker finished second in the Texas League in home runs (25), third in slugging percentage (.540), and 10th in RBIs (68) with the AA San Antonio Missions. He was twice named Texas League Player of the Week, on May 7 and May 14.

Decker split the 2013 season between San Antonio and Tucson, hitting 19 home runs (second among Padres minor leaguers) with 70 RBIs. He was third in the Pacific Coast League in slugging percentage (.534).

In 2014, Decker tied for fourth in the Pacific Coast League (PCL) in home runs with 27 for the Triple–A El Paso Chihuahuas, and led all Padres minor leaguers in homers. He also tied for third among Padres minor leaguers in RBI, with 79. He was named a 2014 MiLB.com San Diego Organization All Star.

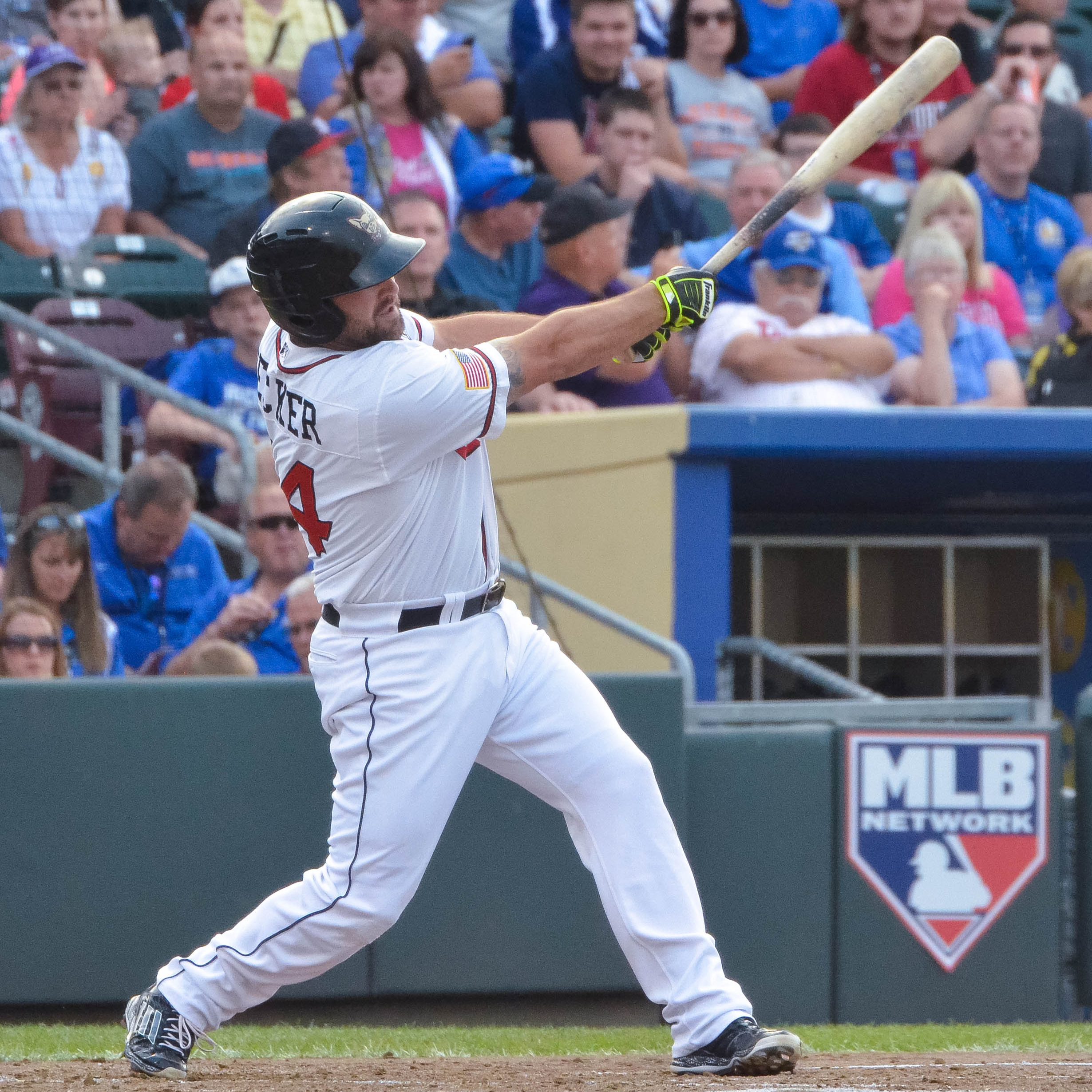
Decker at the 2015 Triple-A All-Star Game

In 2015, he was a PCL mid-season All Star with El Paso, and an MiLB.com San Diego Organization All Star. Decker had the fourth-best home run/at bat ratio in the league, with a homer every 17.78 at bats. On May 11, 2015, he was voted PCL Player of the Week. Through 2015, he was the all-time minor league home run leader for the Padres, with 154. Sam Geaney, the Padres' director of player development, described him as "big-time right-handed power." Afterwards, newspaper El Paso Times called him "the most popular player during the El Paso Chihuahuas' first two seasons." Announcer Tim Hagerty said he had not ever seen a ballplayer connect with a team's fan base as Decker did with El Paso.

Decker made his major-league debut with the Padres on September 14, 2015, after 2,566 at bats in 761 games over seven seasons in the minor leagues. At the time, his 154 home runs in the minors were the most by any MLB-affiliated minor-league player since he was drafted in 2009, and the most by a Padres minor leaguer. Decker went hitless with an RBI in 11 at bats, and became a free agent after his debut season.

=== Kansas City Royals ===
Decker signed a minor-league contract with the Kansas City Royals on December 3, 2015. In seven games for the Triple–A Omaha Storm Chasers, he went 5-for-18 (.278) with three home runs and five RBI.

=== Colorado Rockies ===
Decker was traded to the Colorado Rockies on April 20, 2016. He played 14 games for the Triple–A Albuquerque Isotopes, batting .208/.246/.377 with two home runs and four RBI. Decker was released by the Rockies organization on May 17.

=== Boston Red Sox ===
On June 13, 2016, Decker signed a minor-league contract with the Boston Red Sox, who assigned him to the Portland Sea Dogs in the Double-A Eastern League. In 63 games for Portland, he slashed .232/.284/.481 with 14 home runs and 37 RBI. Decker elected free agency following the season on November 7.

=== Milwaukee Brewers ===
On January 8, 2017, Decker signed a minor-league contract with the Milwaukee Brewers. Decker was to convert full-time to catcher. Decker had been managed by Pat Murphy, the Brewers bench coach, when both of them were in the San Diego Padres system. The Brewers released him on March 27.

=== New York Mets ===
On April 12, 2017, the New York Mets signed Decker to a minor-league deal. He was the leading active career minor league home run hitter at the time, with 173. He initially played for the Binghamton Rumble Ponies, of the Double–A Eastern League, for whom he batted .257/.351/.522 with 7 home runs and 24 RBIs in 113 at bats. In June, he was promoted to the Las Vegas 51s of the Triple–A Pacific Coast League, for whom he batted .238/.304/.460 with 8 home runs and 21 RBIs in 126 at bats. Decker elected free agency following the season.

=== Arizona Diamondbacks ===
Decker signed a minor-league contract with the Arizona Diamondbacks on February 1, 2018. He spent nearly the entire season playing for the Reno Aces in the Pacific Coast League, batting .268/.363/.516, with nine home runs and 28 RBI in 153 at bats. He finished the season with 197 career home runs in the minor leagues.

In October 2018, the Diamondbacks re-signed Decker and again assigned him to the Triple–A Reno Aces. In 2019 for Reno, he batted .240/.348/.521, with seven home runs and 21 RBI in 96 at-bats.

On July 7, 2019, Decker announced his retirement from professional baseball.

== Team Israel ==
In 2012, by virtue of his Jewish heritage, Decker played for the Israel national baseball team in the qualifying rounds of the 2013 World Baseball Classic. He was 1-10 in three games, and had two RBIs. During the opening game, Decker was the starting left fielder and batted fourth, going 0-for-4 with a strikeout. During the second game, Decker again started in left field while batting clean up, going 0-for-4 with a strikeout. In the third and final game Decker went 1-for-2 with two walks (one intentional), two RBIs and a strikeout.

Decker played for Israel at the 2017 World Baseball Classic qualifier. Decker was the starting third baseman during all three of Israel's games, batted fifth. During the opening game Decker went 1-for-3 with a double, an RBI on a sacrifice fly, and a run scored, with one strikeout, before being replaced defensively by Mitch Glasser. Against Brazil in the second game, Decker with 1-for-2, while picking up the game's only RBI on a sacrifice fly, before again being replaced defensively by Glasser. During the third and final game of the qualifier, Decker went 1-for-3, with a solo home run and a walk.

Decker played for Team Israel at the 2017 World Baseball Classic main tournament, in March 2017.

Decker brought the team's mascot with him to Asia from the United States for the WBC. The mascot is "Mensch on the Bench", a five-foot-tall plush stuffed toy that looks a bit like a rabbi or Hasidic Jew with a long beard and mustache who is wearing a tallis and holding a candle. "Mensch", in Yiddish, means a person of integrity or honor. Decker said he "tried getting him a first-class ticket. But that didn’t fly, so he was put in a duffel bag and checked." The mascot proved to be a big hit, and the team took him everywhere. The mascot had his own locker, sat on Team Israel's bench in the dugout during every game, and sat alongside Decker at a press conference in South Korea. Decker said:

"He’s a mascot, he’s a friend, he’s a teammate, he’s a borderline deity to our team.... He brings a lot to the table.... Every team needs their Jobu. He was ours. He had his own locker, and we even gave him offerings: Manischewitz, gelt, and gefilte fish... He is everywhere and nowhere all at once. His actual location is irrelevant because he exists in higher metaphysical planes. But he’s always near."

== Accolades ==
Decker was inducted into the Southern California Jewish Sports Hall of Fame in 2020.

== Personal life ==
Decker has earned his Screen Actors Guild card, and had a cameo in the NBC espionage thriller State of Affairs. He also produces his own short films on the side.

Decker is known for his pranks. In 2014, while playing with the El Paso Chihuahuas in Triple-A, for the first month of the season he convinced veteran outfielder Jeff Francoeur that their teammate, pitcher Jorge Reyes, was deaf. Reyes cooperated with the prank, maintaining the appearance of being deaf by not speaking or listening to music. Decker filmed and produced a seven-minute documentary, "On Jeff Ears," revealing the truth to Francoeur. The prank documentary went viral, getting over 1.5 million hits on YouTube. Sportswriter Peter Gammons called Decker "My new favorite person." Decker raises money for the deaf and for animal rescue through charitable events. The following year, after his Chihuahuas teammate Tommy Medica was featured as the love interest in a music video for a song by R&B artist Princess Eze, Decker recut the music video as the trailer for a thriller film dubbed "Tank Top Tommy."

The San Diego Union-Tribune called him "One of the most colorful characters in professional baseball." Decker is also known for having over 23,000 followers on Twitter. In the off-season, he has worked as a bartender, a bouncer, and trivia night host. He has also appeared in several videos for the YouTube channel Screen Junkies, most notably the debate series Movie Fights.

On December 23, 2016, Decker became engaged to model and sports journalist Jenn Sterger, whom he met on Twitter. On January 19, 2018, Decker married Sterger. They divorced in 2023.

== See also ==
- List of Jewish Major League Baseball players
