= Jenn Sterger =

American internet personality (born 1983)

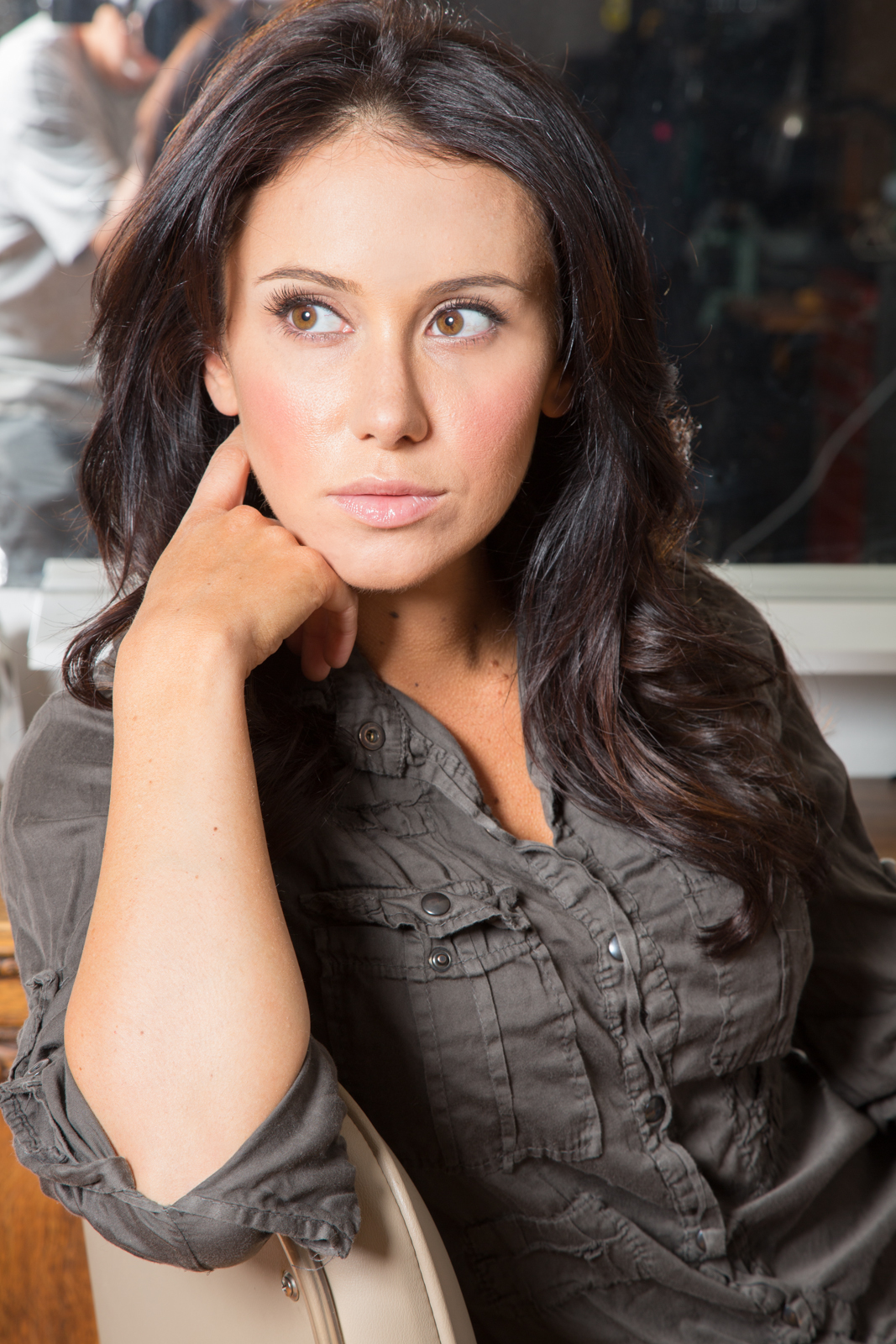
- Sterger in 2013
- Born: Jennifer Lynette Sterger; November 29, 1983 (age 42); Miami, Florida, U.S.
- Education: Florida State University
- Occupations: Comedian; Model; Television personality
- Title: Backstage interviewer
- Spouse: Cody Decker (m. 2018; div. 2023)

Jennifer Lynette Sterger (born November 29, 1983) is an American comedian, model, and television personality. She was an online columnist for Sports Illustrated. She has worked as the "Gameday Host" for the New York Jets and was a co-host of the Versus sports news show The Daily Line. She has worked for All Elite Wrestling (AEW) as a backstage interviewer.

== Career ==
=== Beginnings ===
Sterger was born in Miami and attended Gaither High School in Tampa before attending Florida State University (FSU). Sterger and CJ Perry, who later gained fame in WWE under the ringname Lana, were among a group of friends called the FSU Cowgirls. Sterger first came to attention on September 5, 2005, when she was shown during the Florida State Seminoles versus Miami Hurricanes football game televised on ABC. Upon seeing Sterger on camera, announcer Brent Musburger commented on-air that "1,500 red-blooded Americans just decided to apply to Florida State."

=== Modeling ===
Sterger has posed in Maxim and Playboy magazines and was a spokesperson for Dr Pepper and Sprint. Sterger was featured on the E!: Entertainment Television show Byte Me: 20 Hottest Women of the Web that originally aired in March 2008, where she was #19 on their list.

In 2009, Sterger had her breast implants removed, stating that they had served their purpose for her career, and that she was tired of being stereotyped.

=== Sports journalism ===
After contributing two articles to Sports Illustrated, Sterger wrote a Wednesday feature on SI.com's "Scorecard Daily." In August 2008, the New York Jets hired her to be the "Gameday Host" for the team.

Sterger was a regular segment host on the ABC show Race to March Madness. The nationally televised weekly show highlighted the best teams in NCAA men's basketball and how the season was shaping up prior to the tournament. She hosted a weekly segment where she visited a top school's campus and interviewed players, coaches and fans of the respective teams.

After seven months on the air, Versus cancelled The Daily Line, a show she co-hosted, as of November 4, 2010. In 2011, Sterger worked as a reporter on specials for Fuel TV. In 2012 she moved to Los Angeles to pursue an acting career.

As of 2019, she has begun working at All Elite Wrestling (AEW) as an on-air personality conducting event updates and pre- and post-fight interviews with wrestlers.

== Allegations against Brett Favre ==
In October 2010, reports surfaced on the website Deadspin that during the 2008 NFL season, quarterback Brett Favre was alleged to have sent Sterger suggestive text messages and voicemails asking her to come to his hotel room, and explicit photos of himself. At this time, he was the quarterback for the New York Jets while she was the in game stadium host for the team. The league said its sole focus was on whether Favre violated workplace conduct policy, not to "make judgments about the appropriateness of personal relationships." Favre admitted to sending voicemails, but not images to Sterger. He was later fined $50,000 for "failure to cooperate" with the investigation. The NFL stated that it "could not conclude" that Favre had violated the personal conduct policy, and that there was not sufficient evidence to establish if Favre had sent the photos.

== Personal life ==
On December 23, 2016, Sterger became engaged to baseball player Cody Decker. In March 2018, Sterger married Decker. They divorced in 2023.
