= Jen Yamato =

American film critic and podcast host

- Born: San Francisco, California, U.S.
- Education: University of California, Berkeley (B.A.)
- Occupations: Film critic; podcast host; entertainment reporter
- Years active: 1998–present
- Employer(s): Rotten Tomatoes (1998–2010); Deadline Hollywood (2012–2014); The Daily Beast (2015–2017); Los Angeles Times (2017–2024); The Washington Post (2024–present)

Jen Yamato is an American film critic for The Washington Post. She also hosted the podcast series Asian Enough. Yamato is a 2024 recipient of the International Cinematographers Guild (ICG) Publicists Press Award.

== Early life and education ==
Yamato was born in San Francisco Bay Area, California. She graduated from the University of California, Berkeley.

== Career ==
After she graduated, Yamato was hired as an editor for the then-fledging entertainment website Rotten Tomatoes. At the time, the workforce was over a dozen employees, with a majority of them being of Asian descent. Yamato then became the website's West Coast editor. In 2010, she left Rotten Tomatoes. Within the next year, she worked as a contributor for Movieline and was hired as the West Coast editor.

Yamato next joined Deadline Hollywood as a film reporter, where she reported such stories, including the Midnight Rider on-set accident, in which Sarah Jones, a second assistant camerawoman, was struck dead by a CSX freight train. In January 2015, she was hired as an entertainment reporter for The Daily Beast. She told Anne Thompson upon her hiring: "I'm excited to go back to the consumer side of writing: interviews, news and features, digging into Hollywood coverage. There's a lot going on in L.A." In January 2017, Yamato began working for the Los Angeles Times as a film reporter. She told the publication she was expecting to "shine a light on the business and magic of making movies from the place where they all began."

By 2020, Yamato and her Los Angeles Times colleague Frank Shyong launched the Asian Enough podcast on March 17, in which they interviewed guests of Asian-American descent to reflect on their careers and dealing with their racial identity. Shyong explained the podcast in an op-ed: "When you can't be Asian enough and you'll never be American enough to fit into any other racial category, what remains is this nagging feeling of alienation and inadequacy. And you start to blame yourself rather than the impossible quandaries you're presented with." Guests have included directors Jon M. Chu and Lulu Wang, actors Dante Basco, John Cho and Sung Kang, chef Niki Nakayama, journalist Mina Kimes, novelist Viet Thanh Nguyen, and comedian Margaret Cho. The podcast was nominated at the 2020 Online Journalist Awards for Excellence in Audio Digital Storytelling, Ongoing Series.

In January 2024, Yamato stated via Instagram she had been laid off from the Los Angeles Times, with her last article covering the 2024 Sundance Film Festival. She has since served as a film critic for The Washington Post.

== Awards and honors ==
In 2024, she was the recipient of the International Cinematographers Guild (ICG) Publicists Press Award.
