= David Matalon =

American film producer (1943–2025)

- Born: July 5, 1943; Dallas, Texas, U.S.
- Died: December 2, 2025 (aged 82); Beverly Hills, California, U.S.
- Occupations: Film producer, studio executive
- Notable work: What's Eating Gilbert Grape

David Matalon (July 5, 1943 – December 2, 2025) was an American film producer and studio executive. He was the co-founder of TriStar Pictures.

== Early life and career ==
Matalon was born on July 5, 1943. He spent his early career at Columbia Pictures, where he eventually served as executive vice president until co-founding TriStar in 1982. Films he produced included What's Eating Gilbert Grape and Color of Night. In 1995, he joined Regency Enterprises, serving as its CEO for the next thirteen years. Notable films produced by Regency during his tenure included Heat, L.A. Confidential, Fight Club, and Mr. and Mrs. Smith. He retired after executive producing Bunraku (2010).

== Personal life and death ==
Matalon had two daughters. He died at his home in Beverly Hills, California, on December 2, 2025, at the age of 82.
