= Trisha Hershberger =

American YouTuber, vlogger, and television host (born 1982)

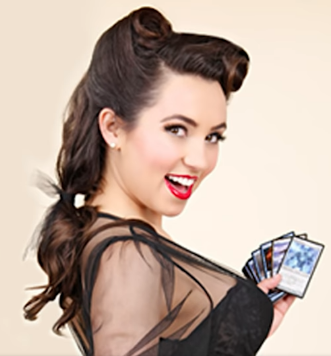
- Born: Trisha Lyn Hershberger; September 15, 1982 (age 44); Schwenksville, Pennsylvania, U.S.
- Occupations: YouTuber; Twitch streamer; host

YouTube information
- Channel: Trisha Hershberger
- Years active: 2010–present
- Genres: Gaming; Technology; DIY; Vlog
- Subscribers: 147 thousand
- Views: 5.8 million
- Last updated: August 30, 2024

Trisha Lyn Hershberger (born September 15, 1982) is an American YouTuber, vlogger, and television host.

Her online career has seen her appear on various YouTube channels and websites, particularly those in the nerd culture niche. Often times in a hosting role, she often discusses video gaming, technology, and tabletop gaming-related topics.

== Early and personal life ==
Hershberger was born on September 15, 1982, and grew up in Schwenksville, Pennsylvania. While growing up, she developed an interest in video games, technology, and DIY. After her parents banned her from using consoles, she taught herself to modify her family's home PC so that she could play video games.

She won the Miss Pennsylvania Coed Pageant in 2002. A theater major, Hershberger expressed she went to school for entertainment, stating that "I liked performing. I knew that I liked being public-facing."

Hershberger has also been noted to enjoy cosplaying and pin-up modelling.

== Hosting and YouTube career ==
Hershberger blended her enthusiasm for technology and background in theater after she "got out to Los Angeles and tripped and fell into YouTube." She created her YouTube channel in August 2010. In 2011, while in Los Angeles, she appeared on stage.

Originally named "nerdychick5", her YouTube channel is now eponymously named. On it, she uploads vlogging and gaming content. Many of her vlogs are part of her series The Naked Truth, no longer in production, in which she vlogged while seemingly nude, with no makeup, filters or editing. In addition to creating content on YouTube and Facebook, Hershberger is also a streamer on Twitch. Hershberger owns and operates her own production company, which has created content for clients such as TwitchGaming and Amazon.

=== 2012–2015: SourceFed and SourceFed Nerd ===
In 2012, Hershberger became a host on SourceFed, a YouTube channel discussing news and pop culture topics. The channel found early success, reaching one million subscribers the following year. During her tenure on SourceFed, the channel also won multiple Streamy Awards, including an Audience Choice for Series of the Year in 2013.

Hershberger was also one of the founding members and host on its sister channel, SourceFed Nerd. Launched in May 2013, the channel covered news and topics related to gaming and technology, as opposed to general news, politics, and pop culture covered on the main SourceFed channel. When gaming and technology industry conventions were held, the Nerd channel sent some of its hosting personalities to cover news from the convention. Hershberger was a frequent on-field reporter, as well as generally associated with discussing tech news.

In 2014, she covered Discovery's FinFest 2014 event for SourceFed Nerd during Shark Week. Later in the year, she made an appearance on Hot Pepper Gaming, a YouTube channel, in which she reviewed Neverending Nightmares. In March 2015, FHM noted Hershberger among a few "nerdy" personalities as representing a change in voting behavior on their 100 Sexiest Women in the World list.

Also in March, Hershberger announced on her YouTube channel that she would be leaving SourceFed. In March 2017, Hershberger made an appearance on SourceFed's final episode of Table Talk, prior to the channel being made defunct.

=== 2015–present: Various hosting roles ===
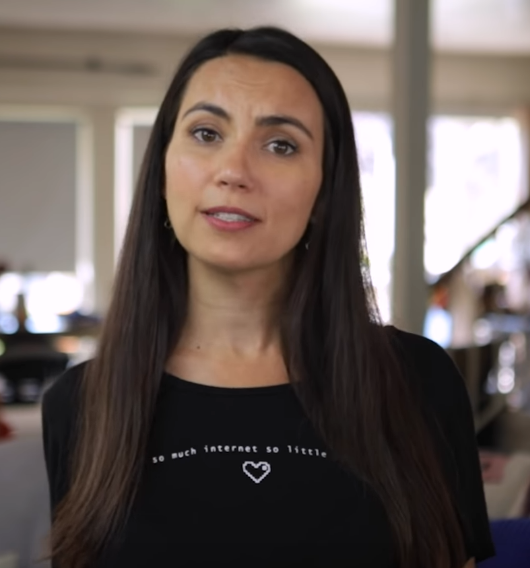
Hershberger in 2019

Following her departure from SourceFed, Hershberger found work as a host and content creator for various channels, shows, and websites. In April 2015, she guest hosted an episode of DC All Access. Later that year, she began working for The Escapist, a video game magazine and website, as an on-camera personality. While working with the magazine, she hosted Take My Money, a series hosted on their website. Also in 2015, Hershberger appeared on Beat the Clock, a game series uploaded by the Buzzr YouTube channel and hosted by her former SourceFed colleague Elliott Morgan. In June, Hershberger interviewed many YouTube personalities who attended VidCon.

In 2016, she made an appearance on IGN's web talk show, Up at Noon Live!

Hershberger was a participant on HyperRPG's four-part tabletop role-playing game series based on The Banner Saga, which streamed on Twitch in 2018.

In 2019, Hershberger noted that she was hosting shows for Kingston Technology, Newegg, Geek & Sundry, and Nerdist. During the year, she hosted an episode of You Know That Scene, a series produced by Focus Features for distribution on Facebook.

In 2021, she spoke with WGVU-FM and WAFF about tech products.

Nintendo partnered with Hershberger and other Twitch streamers in October 2021 to promote their Metroid Dread title. In 2022, Amazon Prime partnered with IGN to live stream a Q&A watch party for The Boys Presents: Diabolical, which Hershberger hosted. In 2023, Radio Times launched One More Life, a gaming podcast; Hershberger appeared as a guest on its first episode.
