= Comic Book Girl 19 =

Internet celebrity

- Born: Danika Lee Massey
- Occupation: YouTube personality

YouTube information
- Channel: Comic Book Girl 19
- Years active: 2012-present
- Subscribers: 475 thousand
- Views: 61 million
- Last updated: 14 October 2025

Danika Lee Massey, also known as Comic Book Girl 19, (Note: CBG19 has said her pseudonym is connected to the 19th card of the Major Arcana of the Tarot, which is The Sun. Interviewed by HelloGiggles in 2014, Massey said that her use of the number is related to Stephen King's The Dark Tower. Tarot symbolism is referenced in King's The Dark Tower series.) CBG19, or DanikaXIX, is a YouTube personality and adult model known for her commentaries on comics, films, books, and television shows. She has a degree in sequential art from the Savannah College of Art and Design.

== Career ==
Comic Book Girl 19 had been working as a tattoo artist for five years when she and Tyson Wheeler began producing YouTube videos in 2012. She remained a full-time tattoo artist during the first year of the show, and quit to promote a 2013 Kickstarter crowdfunding campaign to finance the production of more episodes. The campaign raised over $57K when it ended in May 2013.

In 2014, the CBG19 videos were directed and edited by Tyson Wheeler, and the creative partnership was called "Team 19" or "Team 19 Productions".

Late 2013, she was featured on Gizmodo for winning "Best in Show" for her RoboCop costume at Dragon Con.

In 2016, she was featured in AOL's "YouShouldKnow" series, highlighting her influence in the comic book industry and online media.

In 2024, she launched a second Kickstarter crowdfunding campaign, this time to finance the production of a documentary about the 1988 film Akira, which raised over $53K.
