= Sasha Perl-Raver =

American writer and actress

- Born: Sara Perlmutter; August 22, 1978 (age 47)
- Occupations: Writer, actress, film critic, TV personality
- Spouse: Jason Richard Fox

Sasha Perl-Raver (born Sara Perlmutter; August 22, 1978) is an American writer, actress, film critic, and TV personality who grew up in New York City and Oakland, California.

== Career ==
=== Writer ===
She co-wrote the screenplay for Totally Killer, directed by Nahnatchka Khan and starring Kiernan Shipka, Julie Bowen, and Randall Park.

In 2018, she was one of six women selected for the prestigious Black List/Women in Film Episodic Lab.

=== Critic ===
From 2010 to 2013, she appeared as the primary film critic and entertainment reporter for KNBC and, on January 10, 2014, she began co-hosting the FX's FX Movie Download.

She has interviewed numerous celebrities, including Matthew McConaughey, Jared Leto, Robert Redford, Robin Williams, Robert De Niro, Barbra Streisand, Vince Vaughn, and Jennifer Garner while reviewing films.

Since November 2016, she has been one of the hosts on Screen Junkies spin-off YouTube channel Screen Junkies News. Prior to that, she regularly appeared as a co-host of the Collider YouTube series Collider TV Talk and was a regular guest on the Schmoes Know Movie Show.

=== Chef ===
In 2009, Perl-Raver was a chef on Private Chefs of Beverly Hills. She began cooking to earn money at the age of 16 after finishing high school in three years. Since then, she has worked as a private chef for a number of celebrities.

Her recipes have been published in four books.

=== Actress ===
She has had bit parts in a dozen television series and films, including The Muse, and starred as herself in five series.

=== Other ventures ===
She was crowned Miss San Francisco in 1999.

== Personal life ==
Her mother is Miki Raver, who is an author, former talent agent, motivational religious speaker and former production company owner.

She graduated from the University of Southern California.

She married actor Jason Richard Fox in August 2014. The couple had their first child, Luna Pearl, in February 2018.
