= Scott Mantz =

American film critic, writer, and producer

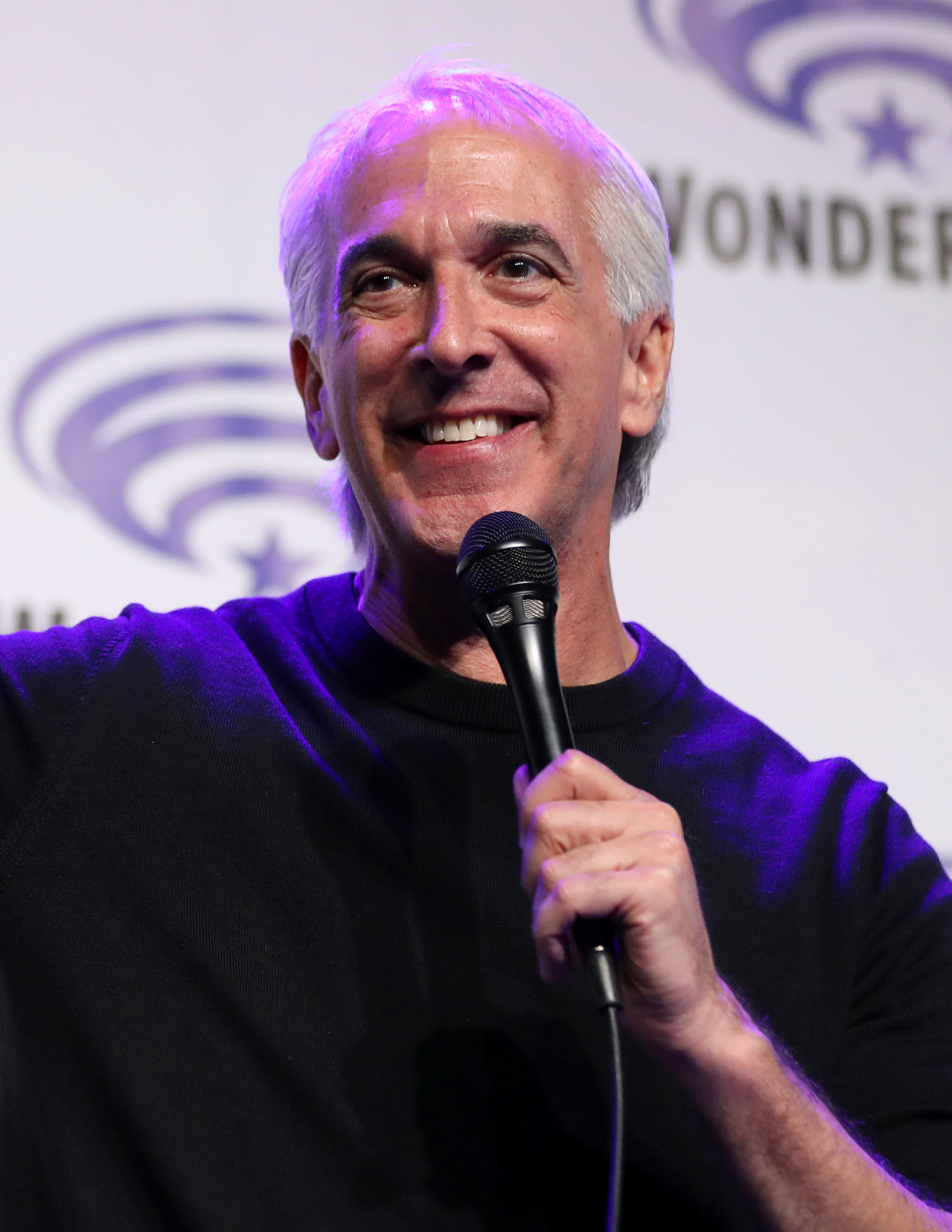
- Mantz at the 2024 WonderCon
- Born: Scott Alan Mantz; 1968 (age 57–58); Philadelphia, Pennsylvania, U.S.
- Occupations: Film critic, writer, producer
- Spouse: Andrea Ronni Sabesin (div.)

Scott Alan Mantz (born 1968) is an American film critic, writer, producer and event moderator. In 2014, Mantz was the recipient of the Press Award (honoring Outstanding Entertainment Journalism) from the ICG Publicists Guild.

From October 2000 to January 2018, Mantz was the resident film critic and film segment producer for Access Hollywood. He was also previously employed at Collider, where he hosted or served as a panelist for the film shows For Your Consideration, Movie Review Talk and Collider Movie Talk. He is currently a regular on-camera film critic for KTLA Channel 5 in Los Angeles.

Mantz donated a kidney to his brother in 2015.

In 2016, Scott Mantz, Menzel and Ashley Menzel founded the Hollywood Critics Association (previously called the Los Angeles Online Film Critics Society).

In 2018, he joined the board of directors at the San Diego International Film Festival, which he has also hosted or co-hosted with Jeffrey Lyons since 2015.

Mantz is a co-host of the Star Trek TOS podcast "Enterprise Incidents".

In August 2022, Mantz and the HCA were the subjects of an article in The Hollywood Reporter after numerous members resigned, including the group's president, amid a social conflict that occurred with a member. In the THR article, Mantz volunteered that he was terminated by Access Hollywood, after 17 years of employment, for not disclosing that he had embarked on this side venture."
