= List of MyMusic characters =

This is list of characters from the YouTube web series MyMusic.

== Overview ==
Character	Portrayed by	First appearance	Last appearance	Seasons	
Character	Portrayed by	First appearance	Last appearance	1	2
Main characters
Indie	Adam Busch	"It Begins Again"	"The Wedding & The Baby!"	Main	Main
Idol	Grace Helbig	"It Begins Again"	"Saying Goodbye :("	Main	Main
Metal	Jarrett Sleeper	"It Begins Again"	"The Wedding & The Baby!"	Main	Main
Hip Hop / Nerdcore	Mychal Thompson	"It Begins Again"	"The Wedding & The Baby!"	Main	Main
Techno	Tania Gunadi	"It Begins Again"	"The Wedding & The Baby!"	Main	Main
Dubstep	Chris Clowers	"It Begins Again"	"The Wedding & The Baby!"	Main	Main
Scene	Lainey Lipson	"It Begins Again"	"The Wedding & The Baby!"	Main	Main
Intern 2 / Flowchart	Jack Douglass	"It Begins Again"	"The Wedding & The Baby!"	Main	Main
Country	Lee Newton	"Finally Reunited!"	"The Wedding & The Baby!"		Main

== Main characters ==
=== Indie ===
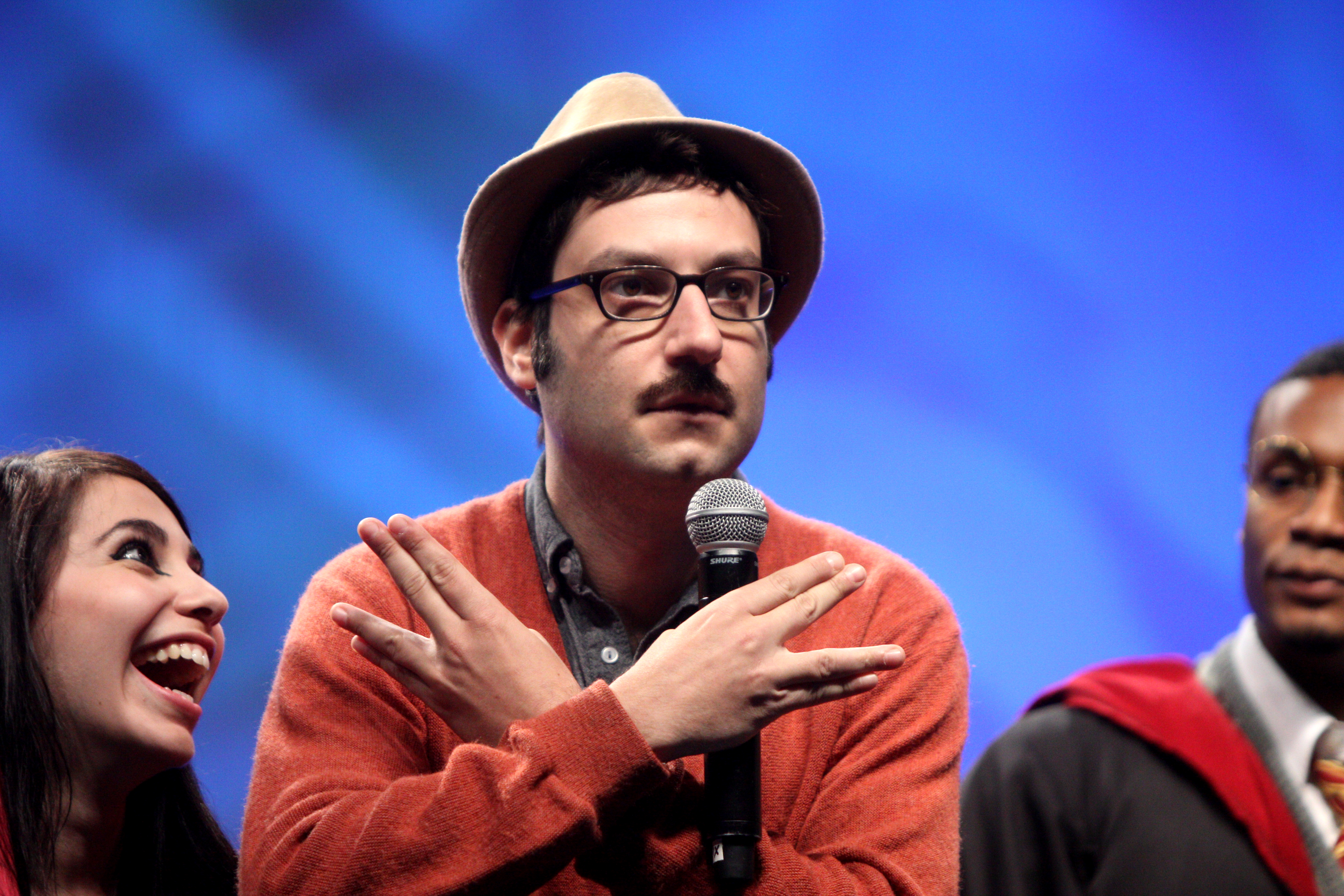
Indie (center)

Jeb Indie, referred to as Indie in the series, (played by Adam Busch) is a modern-day hipster and the CEO of MyMusic. Indie nicknames his employees by the genre of music they most enjoy, with the exception of Intern 2. Indie founded MyMusic, which was originally a blog, which was made to be as "unmainstream" as possible.

After the company didn't find success as a blog, he hired Idol, the company's social media guru, to expose the company to the masses. To ensure the success of the company, he hired Techno & Dubstep, the company's talent booking team. However, the MyMusic website went bankrupt before long. After the company's building burned down at the end of the first season, Indie wanted to return the company back to its roots by relaunching the blog. According to Indie, he comes from an indie bloodline of ancestors, which includes his father, Mr. Indie. A running joke on the series is everyone having magical powers which they can use every ten years. Indie's power is being able to transform people in to giant rats, which he displayed on Loco Uno, a character which he was in a relationship in towards the end of the first season. He is always seen dressed in "hipster" or indie clothing.

=== Idol ===
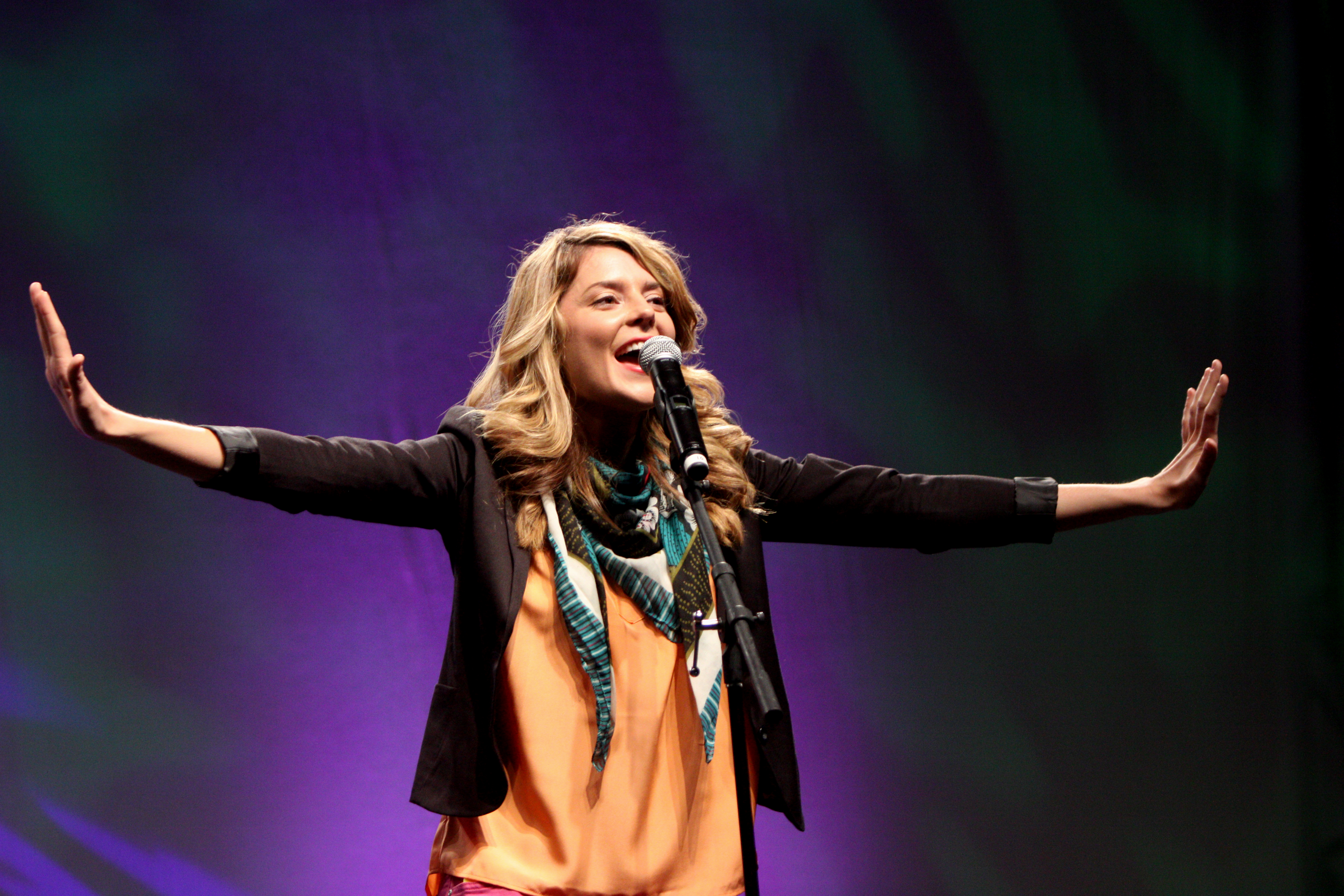
Idol

Jamie Woods, referred to as Idol in the series, (played by Grace Helbig) is the Social Media Guru of MyMusic, and is, as her company title implies, the head of social media and obsessed with social media websites. Idol was hired by Indie to expand the company and expose it to the mainstream which Idol's behavior embodies. Idol often sings, to the point where other characters cringe, and engages in social media activities throughout the series.

Idol claims that she was originally a nerd with frizzy hair, in high school, until when she quickly became popular when the "cool kids" at her school made a bet to turn her into a prom queen. The "cool kids" smoothed out her hair, and getting her to wear contacts instead of her glasses. Idol claims that her grandmother was a queen, who gave her etiquette lessons as a solution to her clumsiness. Adding to her exaggerated story, she would turn into a werewolf when she was made too angry, until the aforementioned "cool kids" aided her in controlling her anger through anger management classes. Idol finishes her backstory claims stating a film, that went directly to Redbox was made about her. Idol, then started to embody mainstream characteristics, having sent audition tapes to several reality shows, and claiming to be the inventor of the "duck face". In the second season, it is revealed that she has a cousin, nicknamed Country. She last appeared in the seventh episode of the second season, in which she leaves MyMusic after getting an offer by Country to be on a reality show.

=== Metal ===
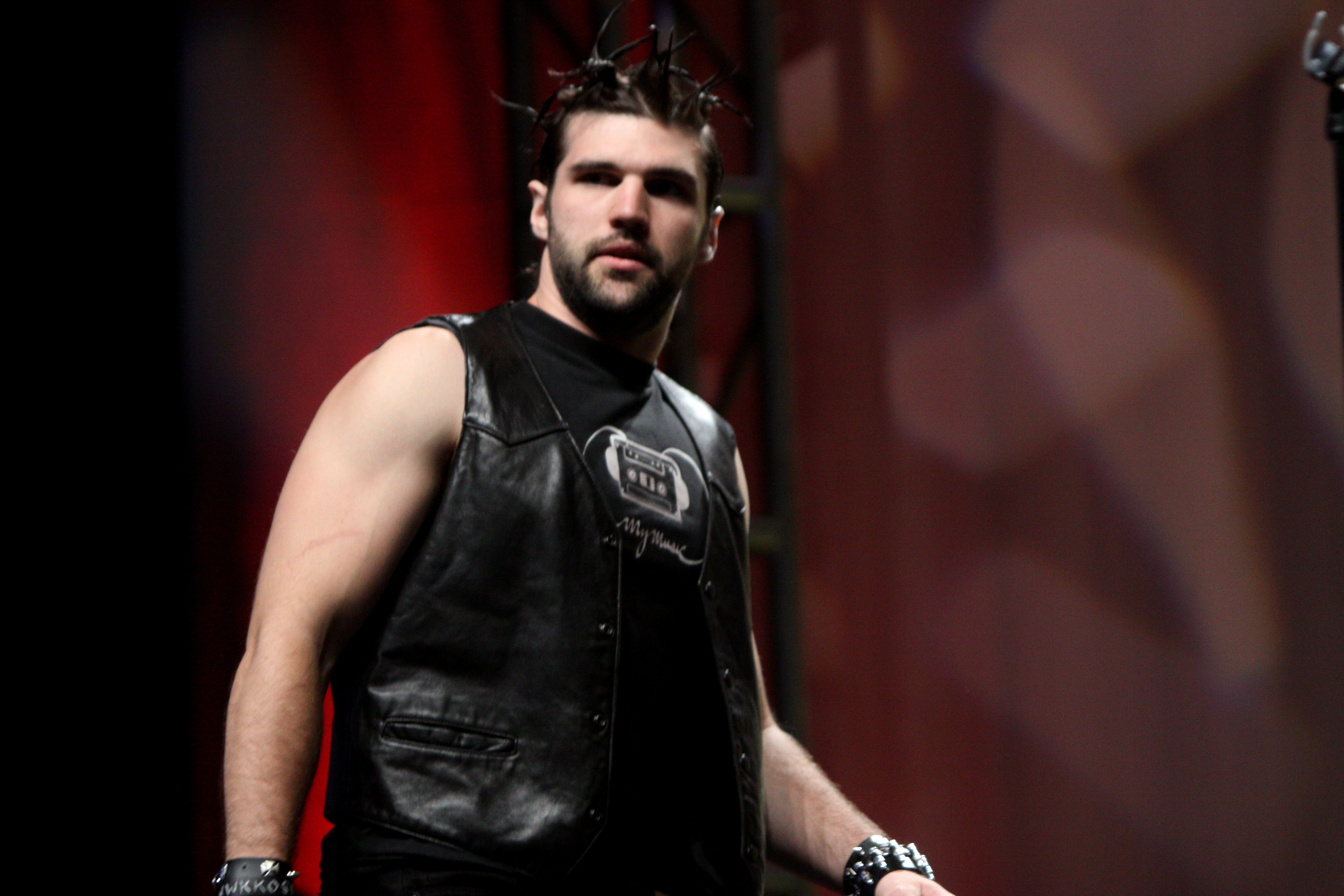
Metal

Emmet Allan Klaga, referred to as Metal in the series, (played by Jarrett Sleeper) is the Head of Production at MyMusic. At the age of 12, at the 1996 Ozzfest, he met a girl named Tina, and had "no idea what the heck happened", and had a child which they named Rayna.

Metal is not associated with MyMusic's early history, as it is revealed, in the pilot episode, he had been hired by Indie as a new employee. He arrived late to work on the first day, much to Indie's dismay. He was shortly appointed the head of production, with his production team consisting of the two interns of MyMusic, Scene and Intern 2. He revealed his frustration about his inexperienced production team, and states he has a case of anger-management issues.

It is revealed that he was not the first MyMusic employee to be nicknamed, Metal, as a previous employee was revealed to be a poseur. The character's hairstyle and characteristics is inspired by Rafi Fine's, one of the show's creators, own hairstyle and experiences in high school.

=== Hip Hop/Nerdcore ===
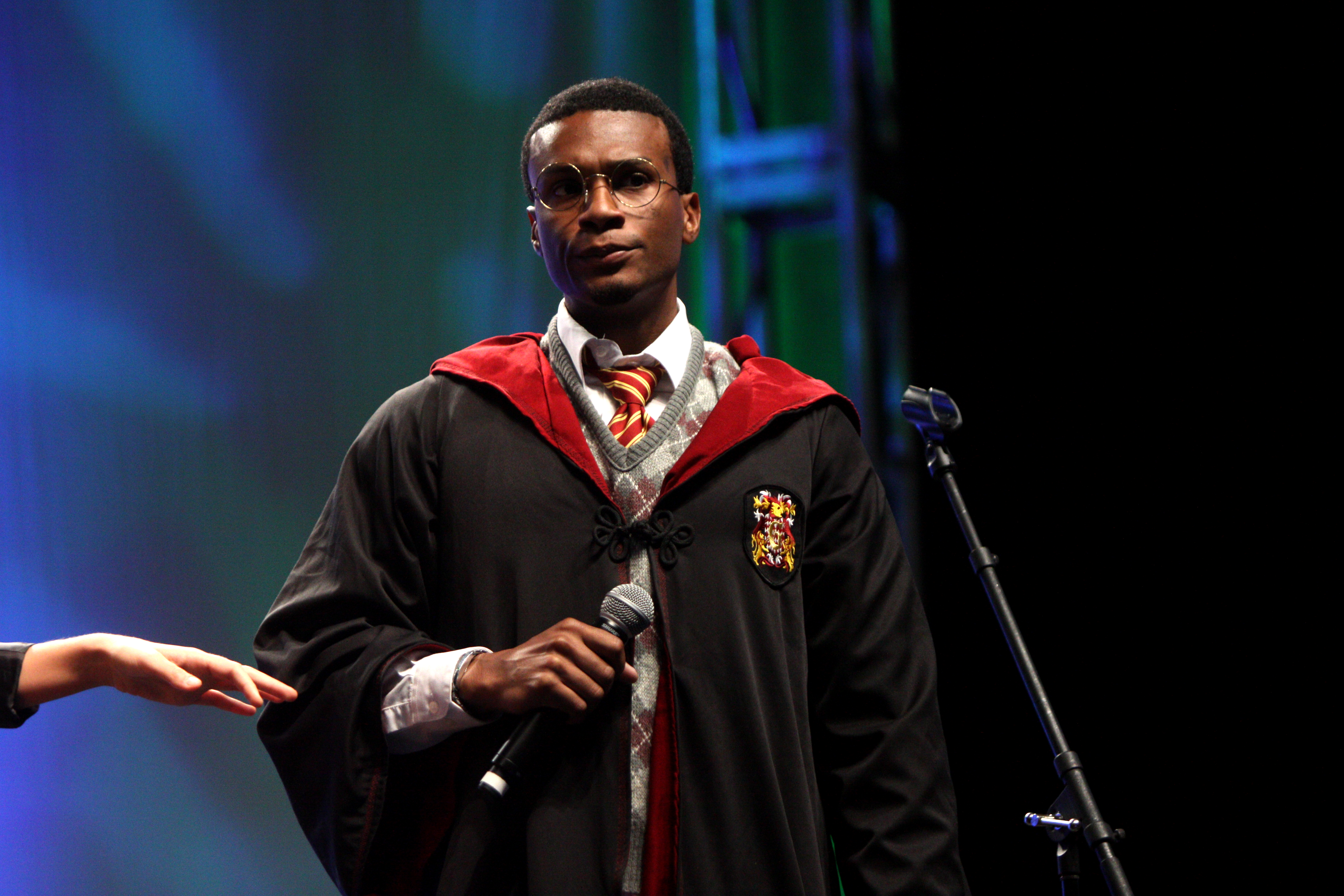
Nerdcore

Curtis Armstrong, referred to as Hip Hop in the series, (played by Mychal Thompson) is the Head of Marketing of the MyMusic company. On the seventh episode of the second season, Hip Hop is rehired by the MyMusic company, under the new name Nerdcore.

Initially presented as a street life-stylized character, who would speak like a stereotypical urban gangster, it was later revealed that Hip Hop struggles to live a secret, double life as a nerd. Intern 2 was the first co-worker that Hip Hop confessed to about his nerdy activities. Lunch, a member of the fictional band ROTFL:BRBTTYL:), revealed that Hip Hop was once a cello teacher. Hip Hop was once an intern at the butterfly sanctuary at a national history museum. After Loco Uno coerced Indie to fire the entire MyMusic staff, Hip Hop admits to being a nerd. Following this event, he openly embraces his nerdy lifestyle. Consequentially, in the second episode of season two, Indie is agitated at Hip Hop's nerd-like antics, and clears Hip Hop's desk, giving it to Metal. Indie offers Hip Hop his desk back, by essentially coercing him to return to his hip hop ways. Following this, Hip Hop has to struggle between balancing his nerdy tendencies and his hip hop label. Hip Hop is shortly after, fired from MyMusic, by Indie. However, after being visited by ghosts in the style of A Christmas Carol, he rehires Hip Hop, and places the new moniker of "Nerdcore" upon him.

=== Techno & Dubstep ===
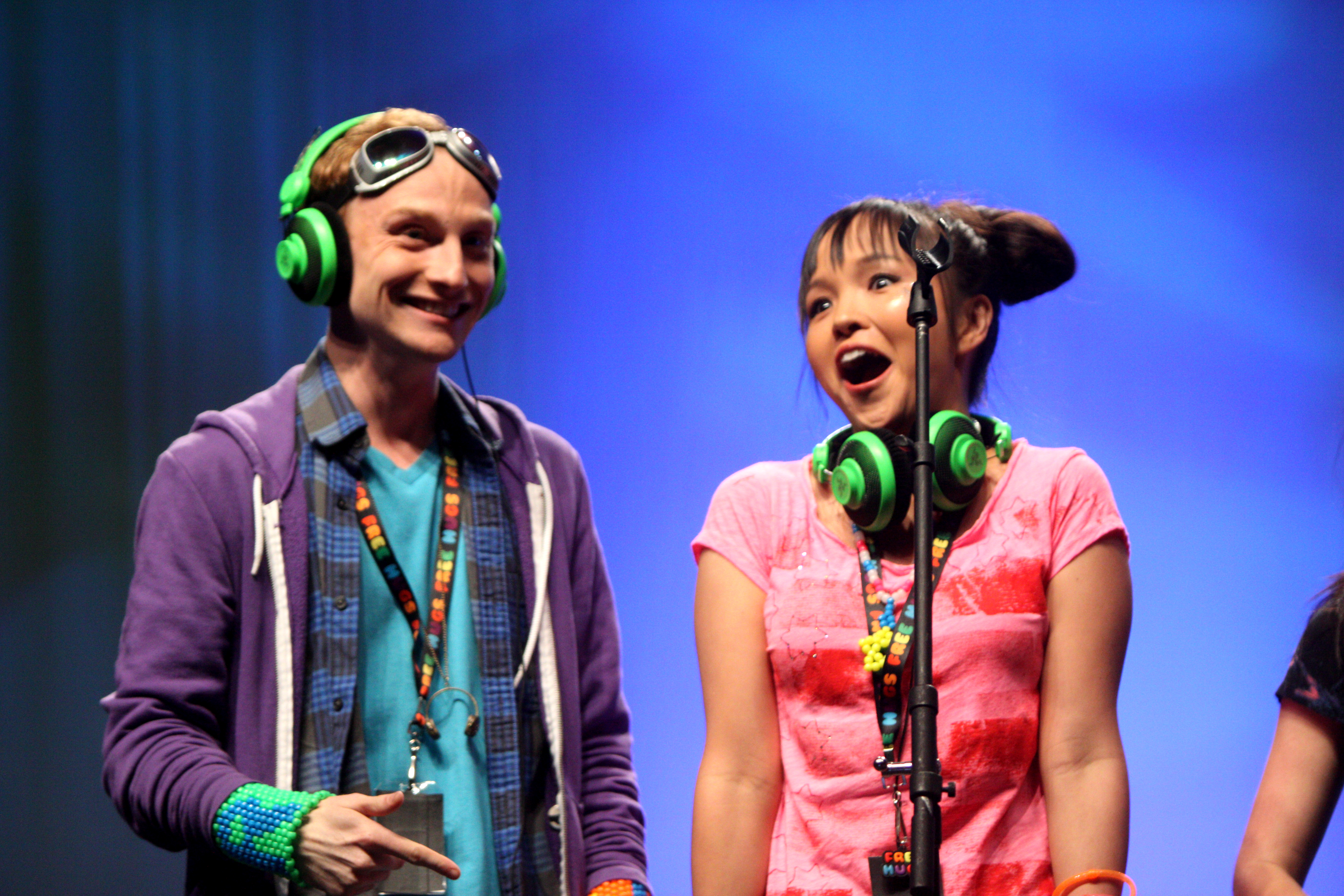
Dubstep (left) and Techno (right)

Sakti Dion, referred to as Techno, (played by Tania Gunadi) is one-half of the Talent Booking Team of MyMusic. Techno is a raver who follows the PLUR philosophy. Techno states that not only can she understand Dubstep, but can also speak in his language. Techno is often seen raving with Dubstep through the series.

Xander, referred to as Dubstep, (played by Chris Clowers) is one-half of the Talent Booking Team of MyMusic. Dubstep is a raver in the PLUR community. Dubstep only speaks in a "wubbing", or beatboxing language. Only Techno is able to understand his speech, which she usually translates to the other MyMusic employees.

=== Scene ===
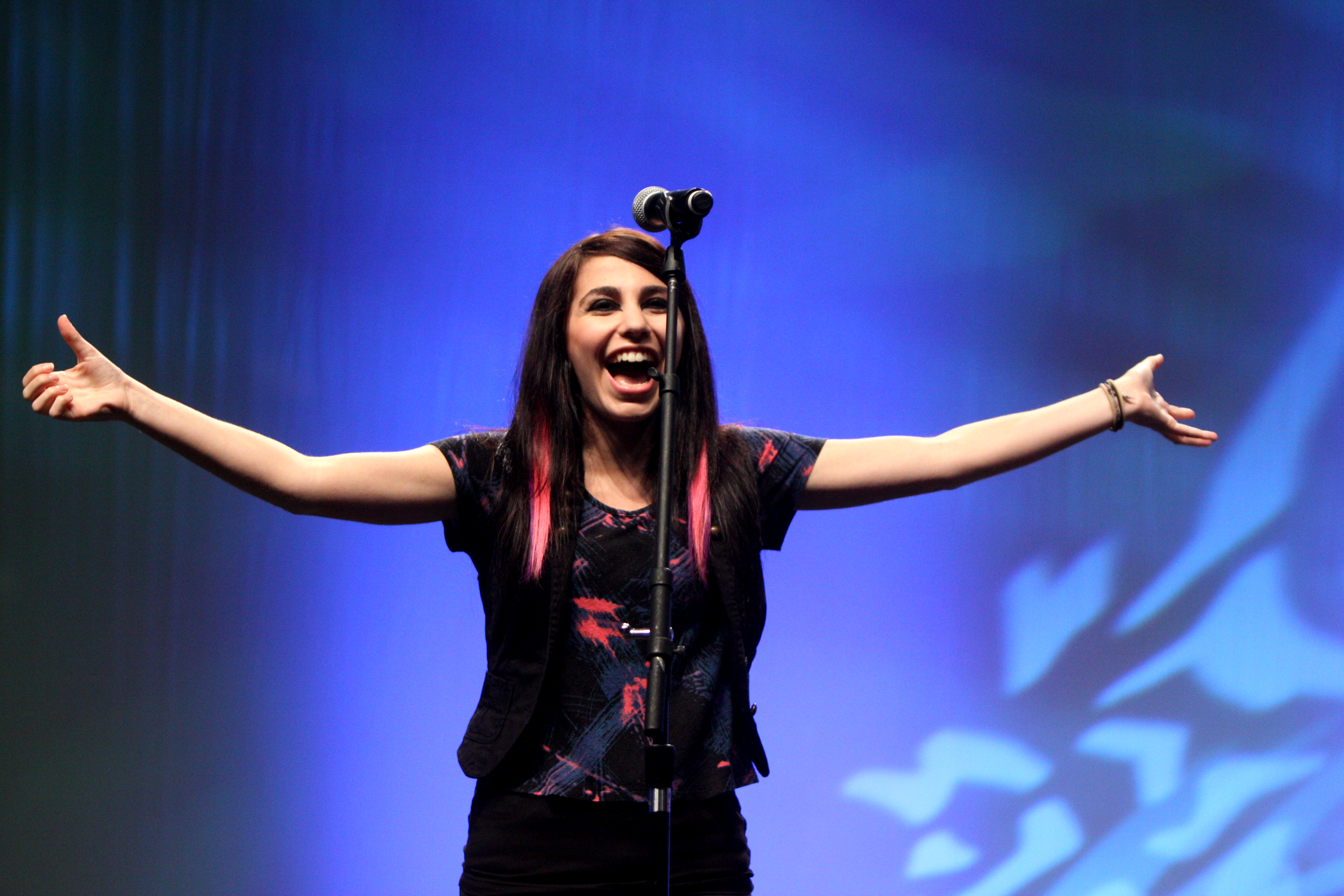
Scene

Norma Haish, referred to as Scene in the series, (played by Lainey Lipson) is an intern at MyMusic. She was the first intern hired. Throughout the show, she has been called "emo", which she refutes by explicitly stating she is not emo. Instead, she is part of the scene subculture. When hired by MyMusic, she immediately falls in love with Indie, who for the most part is oblivious to her crush on him. Inside the MyMusic universe, she is seen hosting MyMusic News, which transfers over into its own weekly show that is uploaded on the MyMusicShow YouTube channel. During a period on the series, she loses her "scene" attitude and characteristic, which exploited by some of her co-workers. In the first season, Scene explains that the MyMusic crew is like a family to her, because her parents are deceased. In the second season, Scene reveals she dropped out of school.

=== Intern 2/Flowchart ===
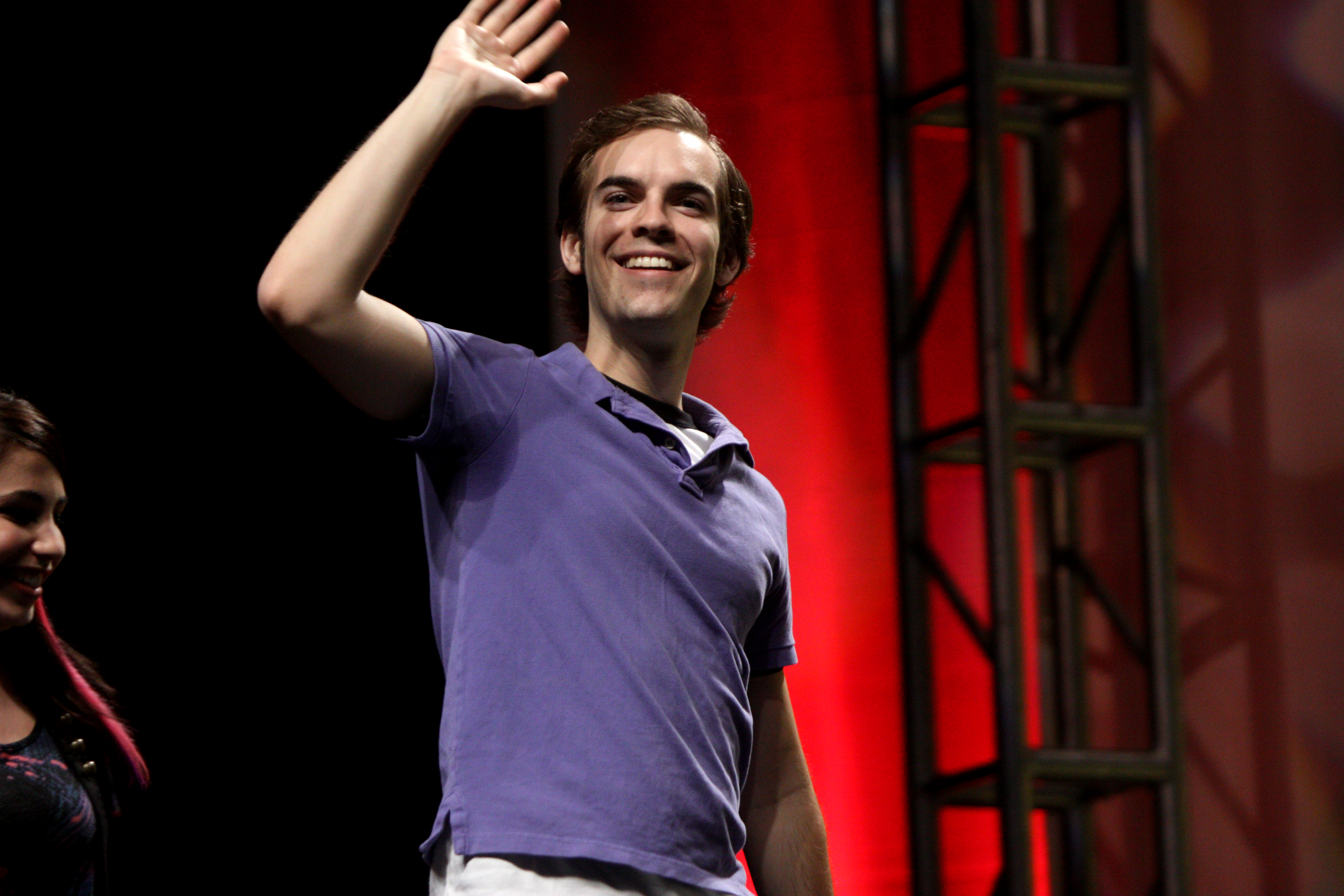
Intern 2

Melvin Munson, referred to as Intern 2 (Flowchart in season 2) in the series, (played by Jack Douglass) is an intern at MyMusic. As his name suggests, he was the second intern hired by the company. He behaves in a white-collar manner, and is often seen concentrating on his work. He is physically abused and verbally maligned by his co-workers, especially Indie, who often uses him as a footstool. Indie constantly yells at Intern 2, telling him to shut up, which has become a running gag on the series. Intern 2 is the only main character to not be nicknamed after a music genre, as he states he does not listen to any particular genre of music more than the other, if he listens to music at all. Intern 2, like Scene, is unpaid for his internship duties. Throughout the series, Intern 2 displays his unusual affection for flowcharts, to the point of fetish-type obsession with them. In the episode "Someone Quits", Intern 2 announces that he is leaving MyMusic to work in an acid factory making flowcharts. It is announced in the episode "Kiss and Tell" that he is to be replaced by Scene's boyfriend, Jeff, as the new intern. Within the episode "Wedding Plans", Intern 2 is seen getting promoted on the spot at his new job at the Acid Factory, rapidly gaining the nickname "Flowchart" within the office. On the series finale of MyMusic, Intern 2 is seen kissing Scene at the end.

=== Country ===
Carrie Chapin Yearwood, referred to as Country in the series, (played by Lee Newton) is the Social Media Expert at MyMusic. She first appears in the second season and receives the title after Idol leaves the company to embark on a fictional reality television show. She and Idol refer to each other as "identical cousins" throughout the series. Country's real name is reminiscent of country singer Carrie Underwood's. Country used the money she won from the fictional reality TV series, Amazing Survival Bachelorette Millionaire, to spread her "3 C's (Christianity, celibacy, and country) lifestyle" across the nation. After watching a film, she lost her "America's sweetheart" image, started sinning, and became homeless. She later turned to religion, but decided to repent in seven different religions, to make up for all seven sins she committed. According to the podcast, Country was abandoned by her father and she's had many torrid love affairs in her past. Newton stated in an interview about the character, "For me as an actor, it was one of the most fun roles I’ve ever done because I just got to play."
