= A New Low =

A New Low or New Low may refer to:

- "A New Low" (Miranda), a 2010 television episode
- "A New Low" (The Real Housewives of New York City), a 2017 television episode
- New Low, a 2010 film
- "New Low" (song)
