= You're Fired (disambiguation) =

You're Fired is a 1919 American silent film.

You're Fired may also refer to:

- "You're fired", a catchphrase from The Apprentice television franchise
- "You're Fired", a 1999 episode of CatDog
- "You're Fired", a 2005 episode of Second Time Around (TV series)
- "You're Fired", a 2011 episode of Mobbed
- "You're Fired", a 2012 episode of MyMusic
- "You're Fired", a 2013 episode of Teen Titans Go!

== See also ==
- "You Are Fired (Take This Job, Ah, Fuck It)", a song from Anti-Flag's 2009 album, The People or the Gun
- Dismissal (employment)
