= MyMusic season 2 =

MyMusic
- Season 2
- Starring: Adam Busch; Jarrett Sleeper; Jack Douglass; Lainey Lipson; Mychal Thompson; Tania Gunadi; Chris Clowers; Lee Newton; Grace Helbig

Release
- Original network: YouTube, Revision3
- Original release: August 20, 2013 – January 28, 2014

Season chronology
- ← Previous; Season 1

The second season of The Fine Brothers' web series MyMusic premiered on Tuesday, August 20, 2013. Unlike with the first season, which had its episodes uploaded to the MyMusicShow YouTube channel, the second season was uploaded to the TheFineBros channel.

== Plot ==
Following the burning of the MyMusic building at the conclusion of the first season, Indie has the MyMusic team returning to its roots. Indie also has the MyMusic crew focusing more on social media and the MyMusic blog.

== Announcement and production ==
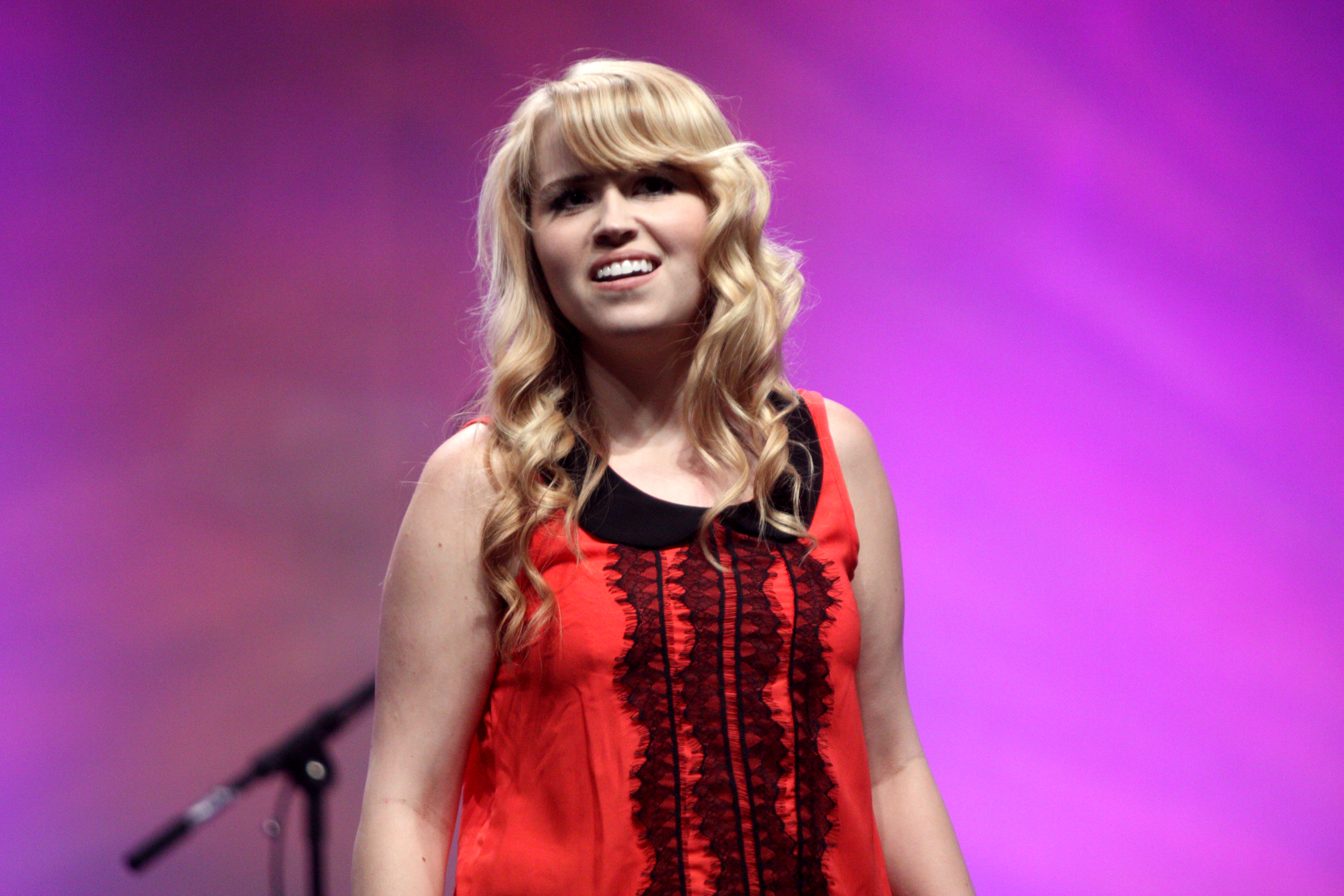
Lee Newton

In May 2013, the Fine Brothers announced the second season of MyMusic, having released an announcement video on the MyMusicShow channel.

The Fine Brothers were cited saying "We had an overwhelming fan response in Season 1 and we definitely couldn’t have made it to a second season without their viewership and participation."

The production of the second season began on May 14, 2013, with filming taking place at YouTube Space LA.

The Fine Brothers have also been releasing several photos, daily, of production. Videos, or "Production Diaries", have also been released on TheFineBros2, weekly.

The second season saw Lee Newton and Paul Butcher join the MyMusic cast. Toby Turner was also announced to reprise his role as Satan. A production diary video was uploaded featuring Lee Newton as Country, confirming reports that she would be joining the cast, as well as featuring Harley Morenstein as Jesus.

The extended trailer for Season 2, posted on TheFineBros YouTube channel on July 30, revealed the season would begin on August 20.

The budget for MyMusic is "nothing close to a TV size budget."

There will be sitcom versions of the arc episodes after all the webisodes air. The Fine Brothers confirmed this in their vlog, Fine Time.

== Cast ==
=== Main cast ===
The main cast from the first season were announced to have reprised their roles.

- Adam Busch as Indie
- Jarrett Sleeper as Metal
- Jack Douglass as Intern 2/Flowchart
- Lainey Lipson as Scene
- Mychal Thompson as Hip Hop/Nerdcore
- Tania Gunadi as Techno
- Chris Clowers as Dubstep
- Lee Newton as Country
- Grace Helbig as Idol

=== Recurring ===
- Toby Turner as Satan
- Lia Marie Johnson as Rayna
- Lisa Schwartz as Tina
- Paul Butcher as Jeff Pookie

=== Notable guest appearances ===
- Freddie Wong as DJ Elephant ("Ghosts!!!")
- Harley Morenstein as Jesus ("Saying Goodbye :(")
- Janet Varney as Nancy Spackman ("I Can't See!!!")
- Joey Graceffa as Vampire Temp ("I Can't See!!!, "Attention & Affection", "Stand Up for Yourself!", "Someone's Quitting!", "Insane Wife!", and "Wedding Plans!")
- Colleen Ballinger as Receptionist ("Wedding Plans!")

== Episodes ==
No. overall	No. in season	Title	Original release date
35	1	"Finally Reunited!"	August 20, 2013
What has the staff and company been doing since we saw them last? Idol gives you a tour of the new office, and welcomes back the documentary crew!
36	2	"Nerdophobia?"	August 27, 2013
Hip Hop's nerd side is finally embraced. However, one staff member has a completely different opinion.
37	3	"Hot and Cold!"	September 3, 2013
Idol continues to struggle to get work done due to Techno & Dubstep's music because her office is next door to theirs. Hip Hop's office is moved to a cold closet.
38	4	"Raver Madness!"	September 10, 2013
Idol sports a new look, Intern 2 & Scene plan to help Hip Hop while things get a little out of control with Metal at the poker game.
39	5	"I Quit!!!"	September 17, 2013
Idol returns from raving with Techno and Dubstep, Scene discusses her education plans with Intern 2 and Hip Hop makes an important decision and struggles with Indie to embrace the real Hip Hop.
40	6	"Ghosts!!!"	September 24, 2013
In this episode, we see how Indie is coping with Hip Hop's resignation, DJ Elephant stops by the office and Metal takes on a new role in the office!
41	7	"Saying Goodbye :("	October 1, 2013
Hip Hop returns to the office, Country finally reveals her secret to Idol, and we say goodbye to Idol.
42	8	"Origins"	October 8, 2013
Scene wants to go back to school and Country reveals her backstory.
43	9	"Team Building"	October 15, 2013
Indie lets the staff come up with their own Team Building exercises, Country is still trying to improve her Karma, and Dubstep surprises the staff with his hidden talents.
44	10	"Sleep Working"	October 22, 2013
Indie hires a professional team builder, Scene is still trying to keep up with her classes at college and work at MyMusic at the same time!, and someone is sleeping on the job!
45	11	"I Can't See!!!"	October 29, 2013
The staff rebels against the Teambuilder, Intern 2 still can't stay awake, and Indie questions Scene's commitment to the office.
46	12	"Attention & Affection"	November 5, 2013
Indie hires a familiar face to help out Intern 2, Scene spends more time with Jeff at school, and the rest of the office works on self improvement.
47	13	"Stand Up For Yourself!"	November 12, 2013
Intern 2 finally stands up to Indie, Rayna goes to Nerdcore for help, and Scene must make a difficult decision.
48	14	"Challenges & Charity!"	November 19, 2013
Country continues to work on her karma, Jeff asks Scene an important question, and the staff starts a charity drive!
49	15	"Healing & Dealing"	November 26, 2013
Jeff visits Scene at work and Dubstep and Techno reveal a secret to Country!
50	16	"Someone Quits!"	December 3, 2013
Rayna finally gets her dad to notice her, Scene makes a decision, and Intern 2 reveals news about his future at the company.
51	17	"Insane Wife!"	December 10, 2013
Indie tries to find a replacement for Intern 2 and Metal is going crazy trying to cope with his pregnant wife's mood swings!
52	18	"Kiss & Tell!"	December 17, 2013
Scene seeks out Country's advice on taking the next step with Jeff and Indie finds a replacement for Intern 2!
53	19	"Family Breakdown!"	December 24, 2013
Intern 2 says his goodbyes to the staff, Scene begins to work with Jeff at MyMusic, and Metal gets his band back together.
54	20	"Fired"	December 31, 2013
Indie fires Intern 2 and Metal gets ready for the tour with his band, Jars of Vomit.
55	21	"Divorce?!"	January 7, 2014
Scene experiences relationship trouble with Straight Edge so she turns to Techno and Dubstep for advice.
56	22	"Breaking Up?!"	January 14, 2014
Scene gets the idea from Country that Straight Edge wants to break up with her; Intern 2's Aunt Beverly comes over for a fun day...?
57	23	"Wedding Plans!"	January 21, 2014
Intern 2 starts his new job at the Acid Factory, Tina seeks advice from Country about her marriage and Rayna tries to talk Metal out of going on tour.
58	24	"The Wedding & The Baby!"	January 28, 2014
Nerdcore discovers something about Straight Edge that throws a wrench into the wedding. Metal discovers something about being a father. Intern 2 discovers something new about two of the My Music staff members.
