= MyMusic season 1 =

Season of YouTube series

MyMusic
- Season 1
- Starring: Adam Busch; Grace Helbig; Jarrett Sleeper; Tania Gunadi; Chris Clowers; Mychal Thompson; Lainey Lipson; Jack Douglass
- No. of episodes: 34

Release
- Original network: YouTube, Revision3
- Original release: April 15, 2012 – January 6, 2013

Season chronology
- Next → Season 2

The first season of The Fine Brothers' web series, MyMusic premiered on April 15, 2012 and ended on January 6, 2013. The series is based on a concept that the Fine Brothers originally developed for a television airing. Sometime afterwards, the concept was adapted for YouTube. MyMusic was the main show on the MyMusicShow YouTube channel, which was one of the first 100 original channels.

== Plot ==
The first season of MyMusic, a mockumentary, documented the antics of MyMusic, a transmedia production company. The staff members refer to each other by music genres which they associate each other with, rather than their real names. CEO and founder Indie heads the team. The company claims to have been given the YouTube original channel, and has a documentary crew filming them day to day. The first season's events and plot were recapped by the Fine Brothers, prior to the second season.

== Cast ==
=== Main cast ===
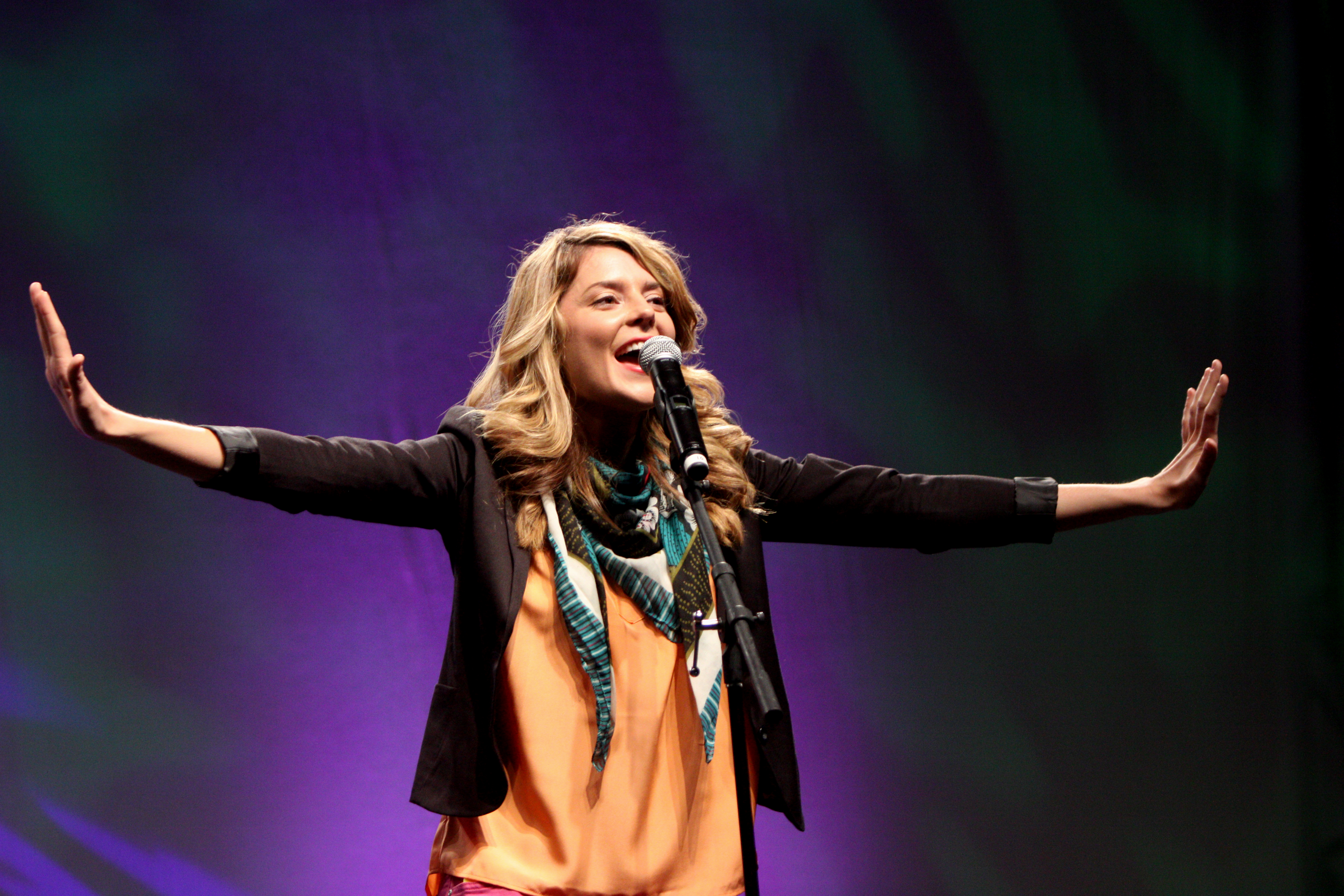
Grace Helbig as Idol

- Adam Busch portrays Jeb Indie, more commonly known as Indie, a modern-day hipster and the CEO of MyMusic.
- Grace Helbig portrays Jamie Woods, known as Idol, the Social Media Guru of MyMusic, who is obsessed with social media.
- Jarrett Sleeper portrays Emmet Allan Klaga, known as Metal, who is a metalhead and the Head of Production of MyMusic.
- Tania Gunadi & Chris Clowers portray Techno & Dubstep, two ravers who make up MyMusic's Talent Booking team. They are often seen together, and Techno is the only staff member who understands Dubstep's language, which consists of "wubbing".
- Mychal Thompson portrays Curtis Armstrong, known as Hip Hop, who is the Head of Marketing of MyMusic, who is built on a "gangster" image, but is truly a nerd who enjoys role-playing games.
- Lainey Lipson portrays Norma Haish, known as Scene, who is an intern at MyMusic, and displays a "scene kid" personality.
- Jack Douglass portrays Melvin Munson, known as Intern 2, an intern at MyMusic, who unlike the other staff members has not been identified with a music genre. He also displays a bland and generic white collar personality.

=== Recurring cast ===
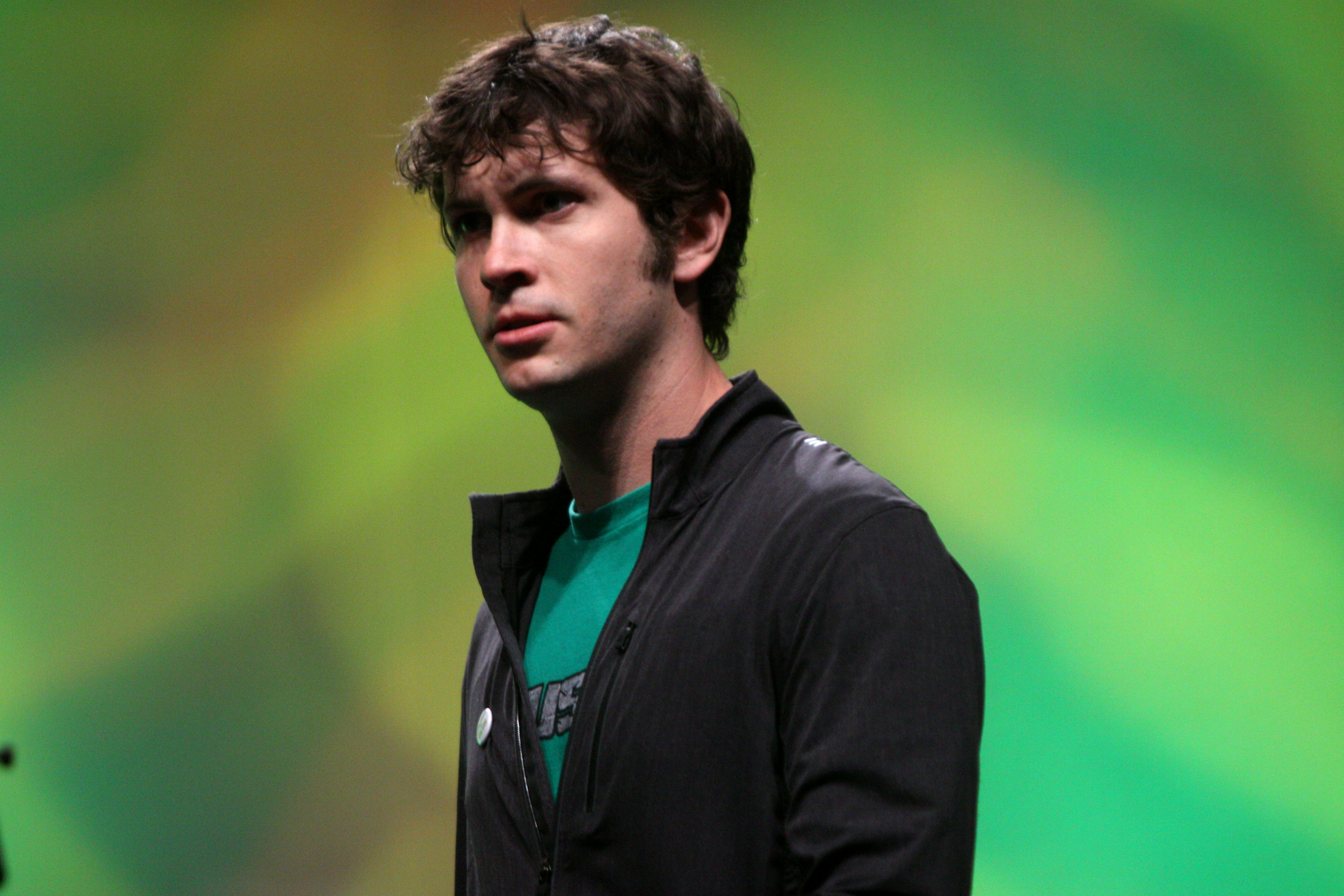
Toby Turner

- Lia Marie Johnson portrays Rayna, who is Metal's daughter
- Lisa Schwartz portrays Tina, who is Metal's wife
- Toby Turner portrays Satan
- Jonathan Green portrays Bigfoot, a silent, mythical beast who resides in the MyMusic office
- Jimmy Wong, Athena Stamakinley, and others portray ROTFL:BRBTTYL:), a music group recruited by Techno & Dubstep
- Rafi Fine portrays the Rat Protector, a man who lives in the basement of the MyMusic office to keep the building's rat infestation under control
- Mike Mitchell portrays The Guess Guy, a man who refuses to provide information, rather demanding that others guess for the information instead
- Vanessa Lengies portrays Loco Uno, Indie's ex-girlfriend, who initially comes off as a sweet hipster, but is later revealed to be a manipulative and evil character
- Akima Castaneda portrays Shaman

=== Notable Guests ===
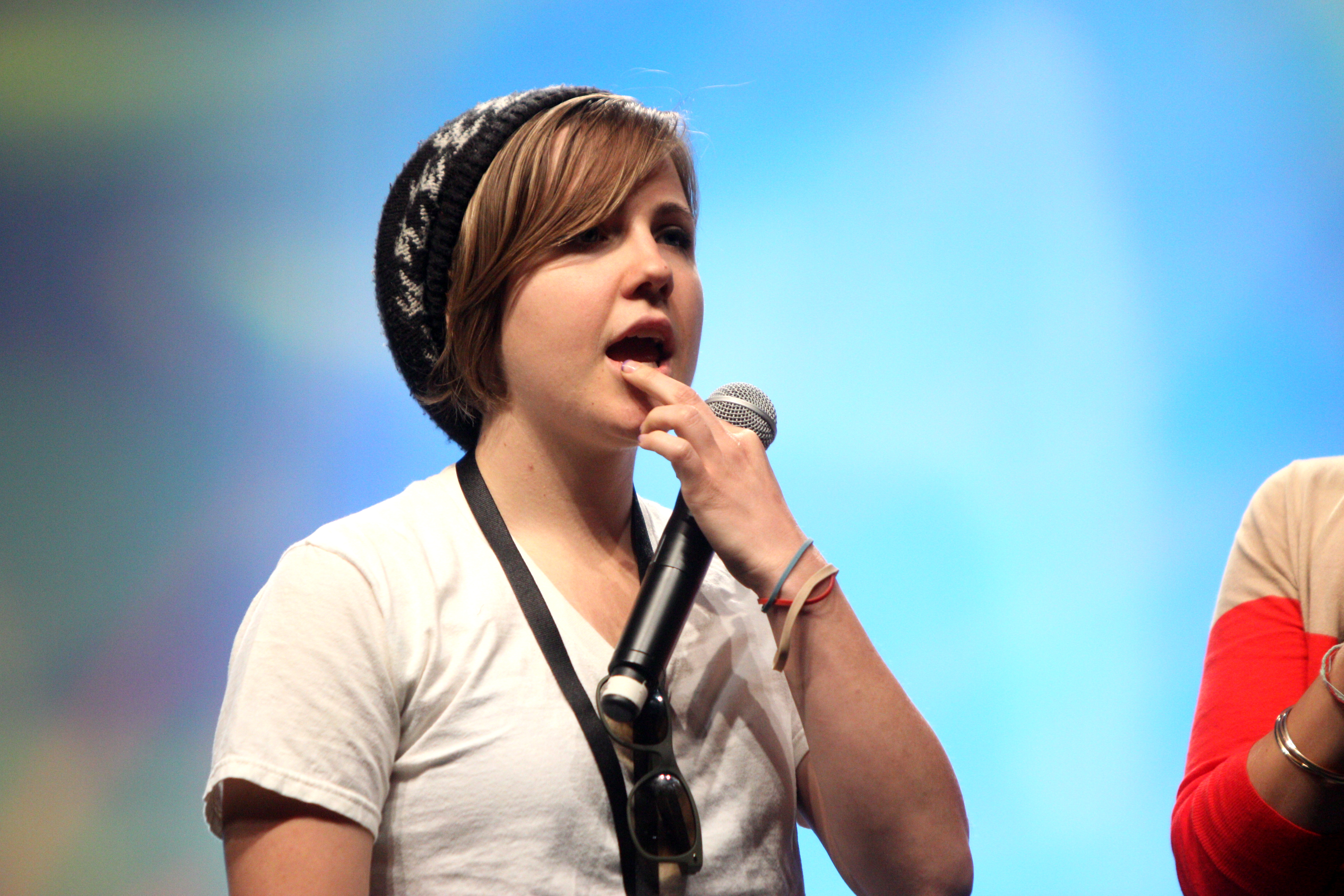
Hannah Hart

- Felicia Day portrays Gorgol, a Norwegian cousin of Indie's who creates black metal music. This guest appearance was nominated for a Streamy award.
- Rebecca Black portrays herself
- Matt Walsh portrays Mr. Indie, Indie's father
- Shane Dawson portrays Chip, a delivery guy who had a brief relationship with Idol
- Steve Greene portrays News Newsman, the news anchor for the fictional Newstime series
- Luke Barats portrays old Metal
- Christy Carlson Romano portrays herself
- Shay Carl portrays Hipster Metal, the replacement for Metal
- iJustine portrays Hipster Idol, the replacement for Idol
- Hannah Hart portrays Hipster Techno, the replacement for Techno
- Benny Fine portrays Hipster Dubstep, the replacement for Dubstep and Lab Tech Boss, the boss of Lab Tech 2, who is a friend of Intern 2
- Michael Gallagher & Lee Newton portray Cop #1 & Cop #2 two police officers who arrest Tina

== Episodes ==
Every five to six episode of the series are split into full-length "sitcom versions" that include extra scenes.

No.	Title	Original release date
1	"It Begins Again"	April 15, 2012
Guest Star: Rafi Fine as Rat Protector
2	"Displaced"	April 22, 2012
Guest Stars: Jonathan Green as Bigfoot, Scarfman as Scarfman
3	"Invisible"	April 29, 2012
Guest Stars: Felicia Day as Gorgol, Jonathan Green as Bigfoot, Creed Rassin as Young Indie, Toby Turner as Satan
4	"Duck Face"	May 6, 2012
Guest Stars: Jonathan Green as Bigfoot, Scarfman as Scarfman
5	"Don't Panic! at the Disco"	May 13, 2012
6	"Back in Black"	May 20, 2012
SV1	"Sitcom Version #1"	May 27, 2012
7	"Secret Lives"	June 3, 2012
8	"Dual Mysteries"	June 10, 2012
9	"Office Dates"	June 17, 2012
10	"Single Ladies"	June 24, 2012
11	"Mystery Solved"	July 1, 2012
12	"They Finally Kiss!"	July 8, 2012
SV2	"Sitcom Version #2"	July 15, 2012
13	"New Business"	July 22, 2012
14	"State of Shock"	July 29, 2012
15	"Family Therapy"	August 5, 2012
16	"Trolling and Jolting"	August 12, 2012
17	"Cover Up"	August 19, 2012
18	"Party Time"	August 26, 2012
SV3	"Sitcom Version #3"	September 2, 2012
19	"One Will Die"	September 9, 2012
20	"The Funeral"	September 16, 2012
21	"Multiple Personalities"	September 23, 2012
22	"New Intern?"	September 30, 2012
23	"You're Fired!"	October 7, 2012
SV4	"Sitcom Version #4"	October 14, 2012
24	"New Boss?"	October 21, 2012
25	"Breaking Up :("	October 28, 2012
26	"Choosing Sides"	November 4, 2012
27	"Sabotage!"	November 11, 2012
28	"Return of the Hipster"	November 18, 2012
SV5	"Sitcom Version #5"	November 25, 2012
29	"Truth and Lies!"	December 2, 2012
30	"Company Picnic!"	December 9, 2012
31	"New Staff?!"	December 16, 2012
32	"Diabolical Plan"	December 23, 2012
33	"Cops And Clues"	December 30, 2012
34	"THE END?!"	January 6, 2013
SV6	"Sitcom Version #6"	January 13, 2013

== Awards and nominations ==
The first season of MyMusic drew ten Streamy award nominations. However, the series did not win any of its nominations.
