= Duck face =

Type of facial expression

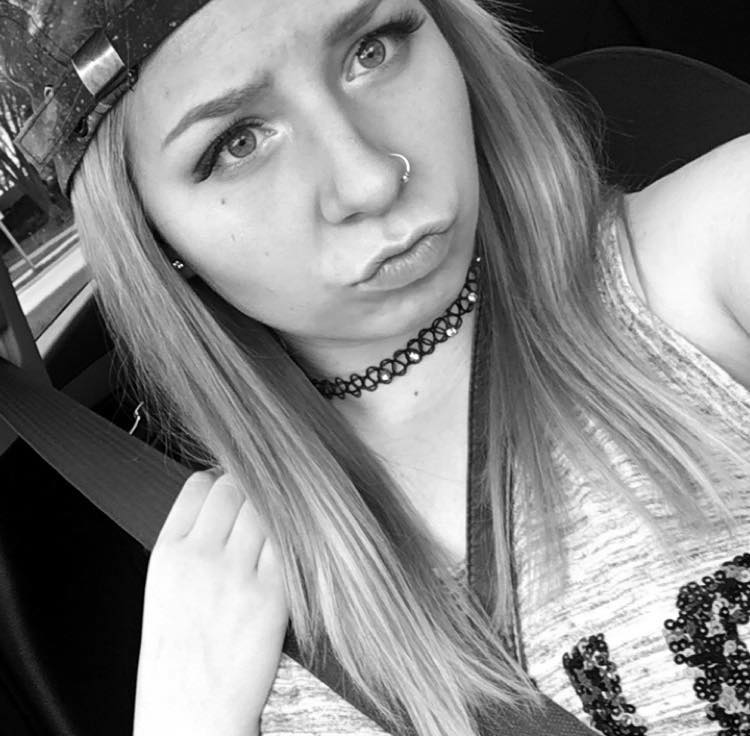
Demonstration of a duck face pose

Duck face or duck lips is a photographic pose that is common on profile pictures in social networks. The lips are pressed together as in a pout and the cheeks are typically also sucked in. The pose is usually seen as an attempt to appear alluring, but it can be ironic or an attempt to hide self-conscious embarrassment.

== History ==
Fashion models frequently use exaggerated pouts, and self-portraits with a pouty face go back to Rembrandt. In the 1994 film Four Weddings and a Funeral, one of the lead characters, Henrietta, played by Anna Chancellor, is nicknamed Duckface for her pouty expressions. Ben Stiller mocked models' pouty expressions in 1996 comedy sketches and the 2001 feature film Zoolander. The silly expressions made by his narcissistic character have retroactively been identified as an example of duck face. As social networks became popular, young women frequently made exaggeratedly pouty expressions. This became a major fad by the 2010s, provoking a strong negative reaction among some viewers.

OxfordDictionaries.com added "duck face" as a new word in 2014 to their list of current and modern words, but it has not been added to the Oxford English Dictionary.

In an animal communication studies of capuchin monkeys, the "duck face" term has been used synonymously with "protruded lip face", which females exhibit in the proceptive phase before mating.

== See also ==
- Duckwalk
- Gurn
- Lip augmentation
