= MyMusic =

- Genre: Transmedia sitcom
- Created by: Fine Brothers
- Starring: Adam Busch; Jack Douglass; Jarrett Sleeper; Mychal Thompson; Lainey Lipson; Grace Helbig; Chris Clowers; Tania Gunadi; Lee Newton
- Theme music composer: Craig Benzine
- Opening theme: "House of 1982, Built Like A Ship" by Driftless Pony Club
- Composer: William Storkson
- Country of origin: United States
- Original language: English
- No. of seasons: 2
- No. of episodes: 58 (Normal Episodes); 12 (Extended TV Length Episodes)

Production
- Running time: Normal Episode: 5–12 minutes Extended TV Length Version: 30–40 minutes
- Production company: Fine Brothers Entertainment

Original release
- Network: YouTube, Revision3
- Release: April 15, 2012 – January 28, 2014

MyMusic is an American transmedia mockumentary sitcom web series created by the Fine Brothers that premiered on April 15, 2012, on the MyMusicShow YouTube channel. The series follows a group of co-workers that are employed under a music production company. MyMusic is the first transmedia sitcom on YouTube. The series was part of YouTube's Original Channel Initiative.

MyMusic episodes were uploaded weekly to the MyMusicShow YouTube channel, with several other shows being uploaded to the channel including The Mosh, a Q&A series with the cast; MyMusic News, a news show focused on current events in the music industry MyMusic LIVE, a live-streamed variety show; MyMusic Presents, a show where MyMusic cast members interview musicians and other artists; Gaming With Metal, a let's play series; Tumblr Tuesday, a subsequent news show replacing MyMusic News; and Sitcommentary, directors commentary from the cast and creators of the show.

== Premise ==
MyMusic was the primary series that aired on the MyMusicShow YouTube channel. It documented the antics of MyMusic, a transmedia production company where, rather than referring to each other by name, the staff go by the varying music genres with which they associate. CEO and founder Indie heads the team, which consists of people following extremely different–and frequently conflicting–tastes and attitudes. The company claims to have been given the YouTube original channel, which brings along with it a documentary crew filming them day to day.

The second season picks up following the burning of the MyMusic building at the conclusion of the first season. After this fire, Indie has the MyMusic team returning to its roots, as well as focus more on social media and the MyMusic blog.

== Cast and characters ==
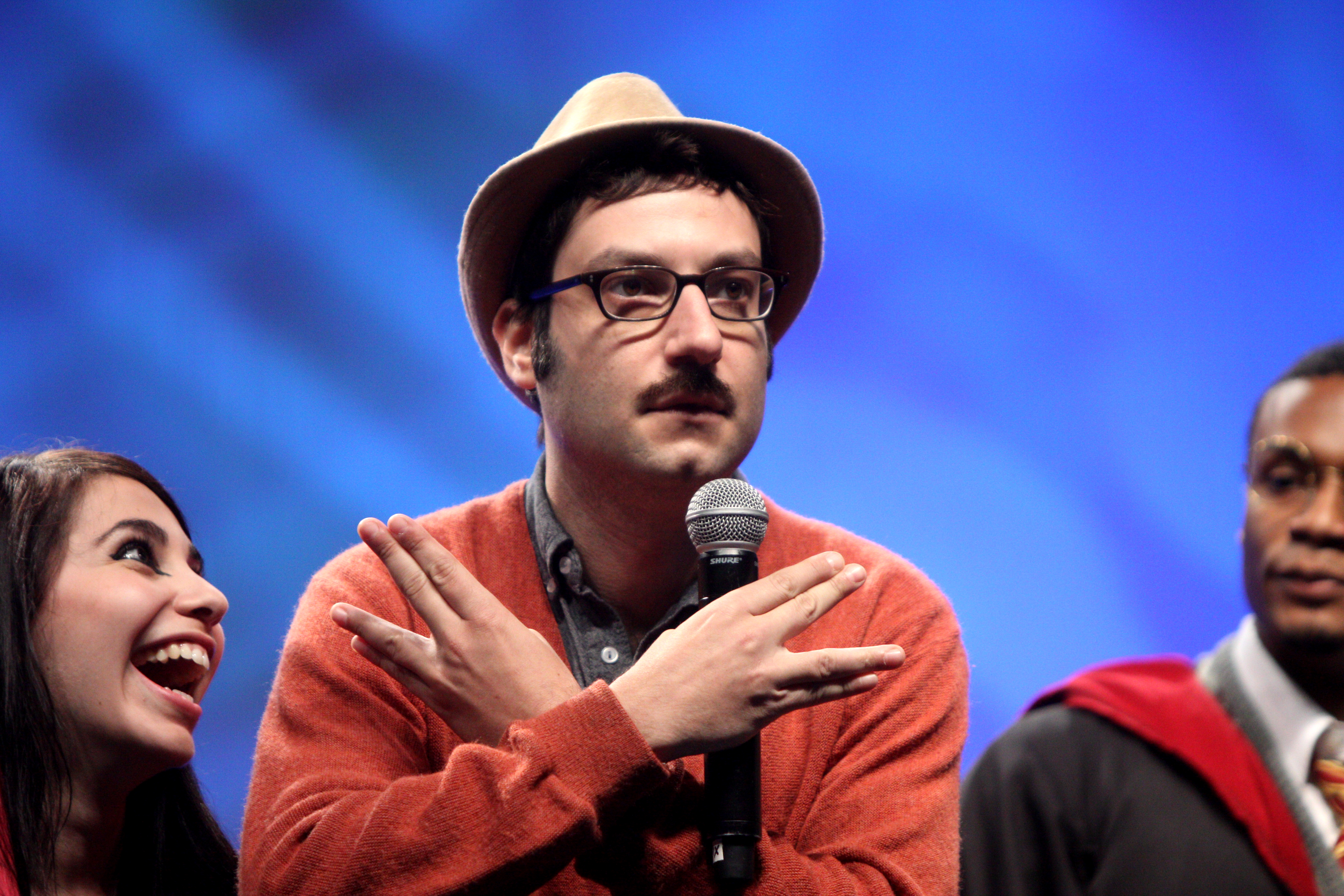
From left to right: Scene, Indie, Hip Hop (Nerdcore)

- Adam Busch as Jeb Indie / Indie: a modern-day hipster and the CEO of MyMusic. According to a quote on the old MyMusic webpage, his real name is Jeb Indie.
- Grace Helbig as Jamie Woods / Idol: a social media addict and the Social Media Guru of MyMusic. She is a big fan of anything mainstream and follows any popular trend. According to the newspaper article glimpsed briefly in the first episode, her real name is Jamie Woods.
- Jarrett Sleeper as Emmet Allan Klaga / Metal: a metalhead and the Head of Production at MyMusic. He has been married to his wife, Tina (played by Lisa Schwartz), since he was 12, and is the father of teenaged Rayna and an infant son. When faced with incompetence, he dreams of taking over MyMusic, and renaming it Metal Town.
- Lainey Lipson as Norma Haish / Scene: a happy-go-lucky scene girl and an intern at MyMusic who has an unrequited obsession with Indie. After neglecting her studies, she begins to split her time between MyMusic and school.
- Jack Douglass as Melvin Munson / Intern 2 / Flowchart: a generic, bland intern at MyMusic who is commonly abused and berated by the other employees, primarily Indie. Fired by Indie, he becomes employed at an acid factory, where he is universally beloved and given the nickname "Flowchart".
- Tania Gunadi as Sakti Dion / Techno: a raver who is part of MyMusic's Talent Booking team. She is the only staff member who can understand Dubstep, and she acts as his translator.
- Chris Clowers as Xander / Dubstep: a raver who can only communicate through "wubbing" and other various noises. Although he can understand everyone else, Techno is the only staff member who can interpret what he is saying. He is part of MyMusic's Talent Booking team.
- Mychal Thompson as Curtis Armstrong / Hip Hop / Nerdcore: the Head of Marketing of MyMusic who, despite his gangster facade, is a nerd who enjoys Japanese culture, playing the cello, and role-playing games.
- Lee Newton as Carrie Chapman Yearwood / Country: Idol's similarly reality show-obsessed "identical cousin", although the two are actually quite dissimilar. Having grown up in the South, she joins the staff to first support, then substitute for Idol after Idol's departure.
- Lia Marie Johnson as Rayna, Metal's daughter who, despite her upbringing, shares a lot of similar interests to Idol. She is obsessed with One Direction and had a brief crush on Intern 2.
- Paul Butcher as Jeff Pookie / Straightedge: Scene's ex-boyfriend and classmate. Jeff becomes Intern 2's replacement, and is given the nickname Straightedge by Indie when he starts working at MyMusic.

== Episodes ==
Each episode follows the antics of the transmedia production company. After each five or six episodes, the preceding episodes were repackaged into a traditional TV sitcom format and length. Additional scenes are also slotted into the "Sitcom Version" of the episode. The first three episodes of the second season were screened in front of a live audience at VidCon 2013 during the "MyMusic panel".

Series overview:

Season	Episodes	First aired	Last aired
1	34 (6 TV sitcom-length)	April 15, 2012	January 6, 2013
2	24 (6 TV sitcom-length)	August 20, 2013	January 28, 2014

== Production ==
=== Development and filming ===
In an interview with New Media Rockstars, Benny Fine stated that MyMusic "was developed first as a television property" and then adapted for the internet. Sometime afterward, YouTube invested money to help the brothers fund and create a premium channel, as part of YouTube's $100 million original channel project, with which the brothers decided to create MyMusic. Benny Fine detailed that MyMusic was considerably influenced by British comedy series, particularly The IT Crowd; the Fines made the MyMusic writing team watch the series.

The MyMusic series premiered on April 15, 2012 on the MyMusicShow YouTube channel, which was registered on December 19, 2009 registration date, predating the series' conception. MyMusicShow was one of the original channels to be renewed by YouTube. The Fine Brothers announced the decision in May 2013, as Benny Fine cited the show's viewership and audience feedback as helping the series get renewed.

The Fine Brothers released daily photos, as well as "production diaries"−weekly videos of the production of the second season−which they uploaded onto Facebook and on their TheFineBros2 channel, respectively. The second season was filmed at YouTube Space LA. Speaking about the second season, Benny Fine stated that the production budget for MyMusic was "nothing close to a TV size budget." The second season premiered on August 20, 2013.

=== Casting ===
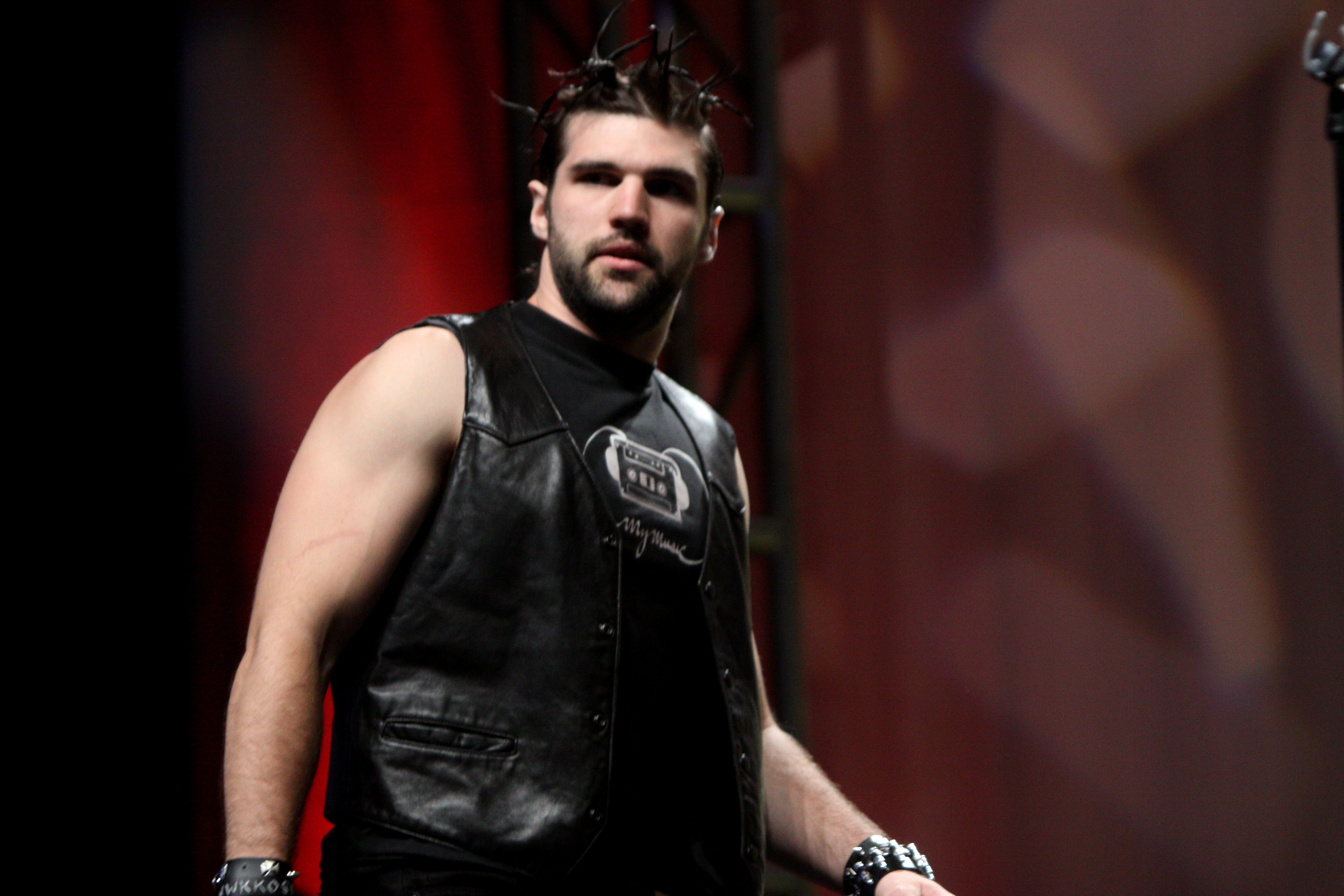
Jarrett Sleeper as Metal

The Fine Brothers uploaded a behind-the-scenes video in February 2013, documenting the auditions of the cast. Hundreds of people came in to read for various roles. Mychal Thompson was not originally cast as the role of Hip Hop. However, for unknown reasons the original actor was unable to play the role of Hip Hop. One of the executive producers of MyMusic called Thompson and asked him to play the role of Hip Hop. Toby Turner was a notable recurring cast member, having portrayed Satan. Additionally, the first season saw the casting of special guests such as Vanessa Lengies, Hannah Hart, as well as Felicia Day, who earned a nomination for her guest role as Gorgol. The second season saw Lee Newton and Paul Butcher join the MyMusic cast.

== Transmedia aspect ==
MyMusic is often billed and promoted as "YouTube's first transmedia sitcom", and several external media were produced to align with the events of the series, helping it establish an interactive social media dynamic. The series blurred the lines of its fiction and reality, as its characters interacted with viewers, responding to their comments and voicemails in real time. Accounts were created for all the characters, including non-main character, across various social media platforms, such as Twitter. As the character's real names were not emphasized in the series, some of these social media accounts, such as Metal's Yelp! and Scene's LinkedIn accounts served as easter eggs for the series' audience. By the end of the series' first season, these fictional accounts accumulated over 250,000 followers.

The second season was planned to be more interactive than the first, with creator Benny Fine stating, "This season we're taking the interactivity up a notch and creating more opportunities for fans to integrate with the MyMusic story universe." One manner in which this was accomplished was through the launching of MyMusicShow.tv, a website which published satirical music news blogs written by the series' characters. Benny Fine described the spin-off news blogs as "one part BuzzFeed, one part The Onion".

The transmedia aspect was able to influence viewers of the series to donate to an Indiegogo project aiming to fund music education.

=== MyMusic Weekly Channel Shows ===
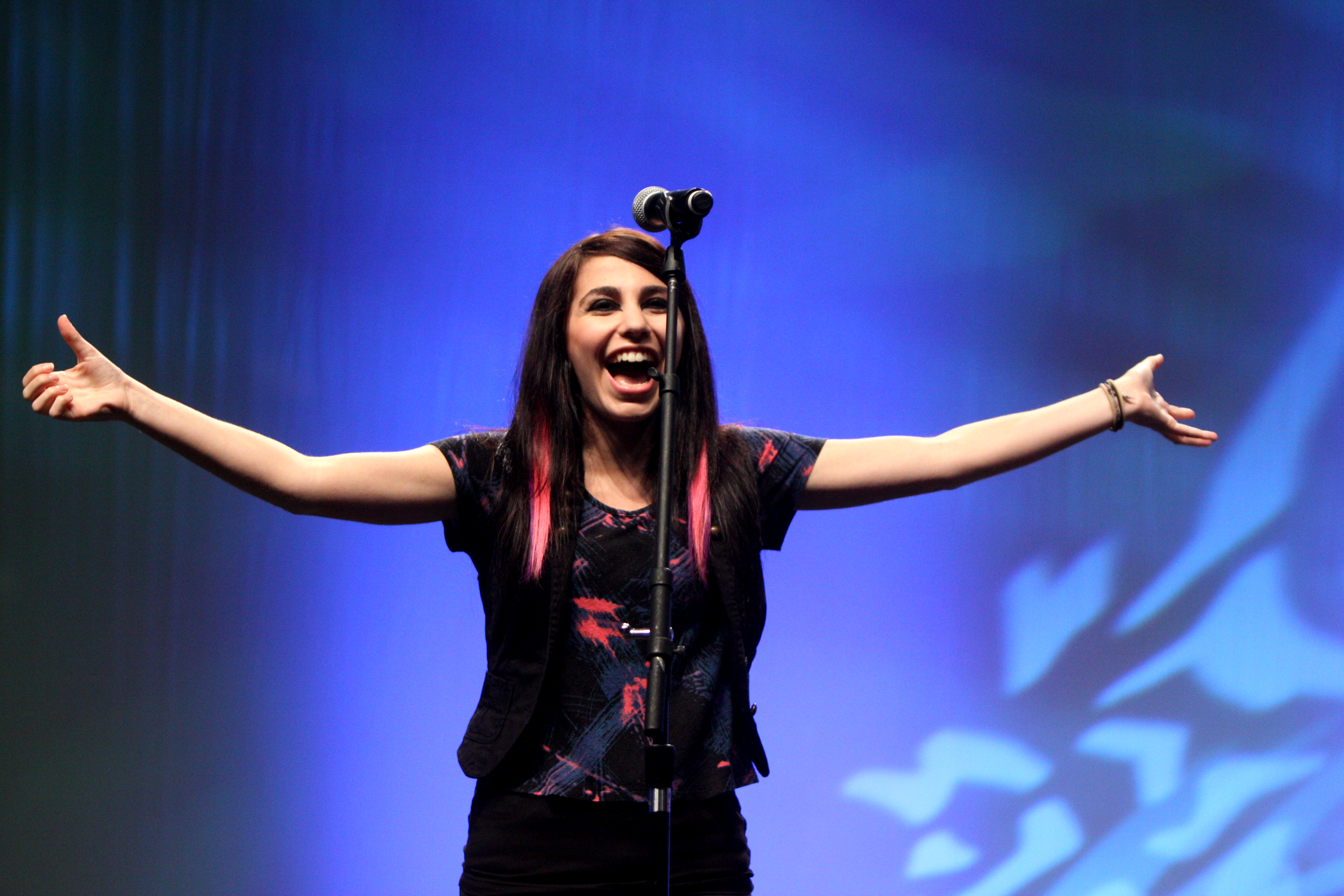
Scene, the host of MyMusic News and Tumblr Tuesday

Throughout the series, characters are seen trying to complete tasks for the company, such as finishing a music news show to later release onto the Internet. These plot occurrences manifested as weekly channel shows uploaded onto the MyMusicShow YouTube channel, which developed continuity with the main series; the additional shows are the finished product of what the characters in the main series are creating. The Mosh, one of the aforementioned weekly shows, features the characters of the main series answering questions they receive on their social media accounts. The channel would continue producing several shows which were not the primary MyMusic sitcom until 2014. (Note: Though two videos were re-uploaded to the channel in 2020, they were originally produced in 2012 and 2013.)

Season 1

- The Mosh: a Q&A series where an assortment of the series' characters responded to comments and questions from various social media websites, asked polls, and took suggestions from the audience to create a custom Spotify playlist. The Mosh was the only show from Season 1 to be continued in the second season, and was the longest running MyMusic show besides the main web series.
- MyMusic LIVE: an hour-long live variety show hosted by the staff of MyMusic each Monday. The live show included interactive conversations with the characters and the viewers at home, as well as performances from bands, comedians, and personalities from outside the in-universe fiction. Guests included Rhett and Link, Hannah Hart, Taryn Southern, Tanya Burr, Driftless Pony Club, and The Fu Music, among others. The show was discontinued after 18 regular episodes and three non-live compilations and replaced with MyMusic Presents. However, the show was brought back as a one-off to accompany the charity story line in season 2.
- MyMusic News: a weekly news show, usually hosted by Scene, that covered several news topics that related to music, musical artists and the Billboard charts. The show was discontinued after 39 episodes.
- MyMusic Presents: a show in which one of the MyMusic staff members interview a musical artist that comes by the MyMusic office. The shows also featured the musical guest performing and answering fan-submitted questions. This show was discontinued after 15 regular episodes, and 2 extra episodes.

Season 2

- Gaming with Metal: a show introduced near the launch of the main show's second season, as the first of a new slate of weekly channel shows on MyMusicShow. As the name implies, the series was revolved around the character Metal, commentating over gameplay.
- MyMusic Podcast: a weekly video podcast show, where multiple characters from the series speak about varying topics. An audio version of the podcast was also released on iTunes, but however, it was removed.
- Tumblr Tuesday (stylized as tumblr. tuesday.): a series that replaced MyMusic News, with Scene's hosting carrying over into the newer series.
- Sitcommentary: a show in which Benny Fine and cast members watched and provided commentary on the second season of the main series' sitcom-length version.

== Reception ==
=== Critical reception ===
Emily Eifler of KQED wrote positively on the series, stating "MyMusic is genuinely hilarious when it focuses on subtle character humor. It has a self-conscious, of-the-moment quality that will surely date quickly in the high-speed evolution of online content, but that's part of its charm. MyMusic is deliciously hypercurrent, an emblem of the times."

Michael Andersen of Wired commented:

The writing and acting rarely strays from its purposefully Vaudevillian excesses, but the characters begin to find themselves, and move beyond their names. In MyMusic's second season, these more nuanced characters are forced to reconcile their work life with their hopes and dreams, leading many characters to seriously consider leaving MyMusic to pursue an education, a new career, or the chance for fame and fortune.

Andersen added, "MyMusic was consciously designed with younger audiences in mind, loading every episode with a healthy dose of sight gags, catchphrases, and risqué punchlines."

=== Viewership ===
The MyMusicShow YouTube channel accumulated over 100,000 subscribers prior to the release of the first episode. By December 2012, the MyMusicShow YouTube channel accumulated over 250,000 subscribers and 20 million video views. The first season generated 26–30 million video views, with individual episodes varying between 200,000 and 1 million views. The final sitcom-length episode of the series was uploaded on March 16, 2014. At the time, the MyMusicShow YouTube account had accumulated over 496,000 subscribers and 41.2 million video views. While the channel's videos continue to receive views, having received over 48.5 million, (Note: As of April 6, 2020) the channel peaked around just under 500,000 subscribers.

=== Awards and nominations ===
In 2013, MyMusic was nominated for 10 Streamy Awards, the most of any show that year, as well as 2 IAWTV Awards.

Year	Ceremony	Category	Nominee(s)	Result	Ref
2013	IAWTV Awards	Best Interactive/Social Media Experience	MyMusic	Nominated	
2013	IAWTV Awards	Best Supplemental Content	MyMusic	Nominated	
2013	Streamy Awards	Best Direction	The Fine Brothers	Nominated	
2013	Streamy Awards	Best Writing: Comedy	Fine Brothers & team	Nominated	
2013	Streamy Awards	Best Editing	Fine Brothers & team	Nominated	
2013	Streamy Awards	Best Guest Appearance	Felicia Day	Nominated	
2013	Streamy Awards	Best Comedy Series	MyMusic	Nominated	
2013	Streamy Awards	Best Production Design	Greg Aronowitz and Alynne Schripsema	Nominated	
2013	Streamy Awards	Best Visual Effects	William Hyler	Nominated	
2013	Streamy Awards	Best Use of Fashion & Design	Cici Andersen and Catherine Elhoffer	Nominated	
2013	Streamy Awards	Best Choreography	Kathryn Burns	Nominated	
2013	Streamy Awards	Audience Choice for Series of the Year	MyMusic	Nominated	
2014	IAWTV Awards	Best Supplemental Content	MyMusic	Nominated	
2014	Streamy Awards	Best Comedy Series	MyMusic	Nominated	
2014	Streamy Awards	Best Ensemble	MyMusic	Nominated	
2014	Streamy Awards	Audience Choice for Series of the Year	MyMusic	Nominated	
