= Jacksfilms =

American YouTuber (born 1988)

- Douglass in 2019
- Born: John Patrick Douglass; June 30, 1988 (age 38); Columbia, Maryland, U.S.
- Education: American University
- Occupations: YouTuber; comedian; musician
- Spouse: Erin Breslin (m. 2018)

Twitch information
- Channel: jacksfilms
- Years active: 2018–present
- Followers: 520 thousand

YouTube information
- Channel: jacksfilms
- Years active: 2006–present
- Genres: Satire; musical comedy; self-deprecation; black comedy
- Subscribers: 4.93 million
- Views: 2.8 billion
- Last updated: 27 October 2026

John Patrick Douglass (born June 30, 1988), better known by his online pseudonym jacksfilms (stylised in all lowercase), is an American YouTuber, videographer, musician, Twitch streamer, and sketch comedian. He is known for his web series Yesterday I Asked You (YIAY), Jackask, and Your Grammar Sucks (YGS). Douglass' career on YouTube spans 20 years.

Born in Columbia, Maryland, Douglass created his main YouTube channel in 2006. His content was initially focused on parodies, music videos, and sketch comedy, or a combination thereof. Douglass has referred to this series of videos as PMS (parody, music, sketch). In 2011, Douglass began the web series Your Grammar Sucks, in which he reads comments with excessive grammatical errors. Douglass created the Jackask series in 2014, where he answers user-submitted questions satirically.

In 2015, Douglass started Yesterday I Asked You, originally a segment within Jackask, where he asks his audience questions and reads humorous responses. Originally intended to be a daily series, new episodes are released semi-frequently. YIAY has adapted into various other formats, including a board game, a YouTube Originals show, a tour, and an online party game with Be Funny Now. Since 2018, Douglass has streamed regularly on Twitch. In 2023, Douglass created a new channel, JJJacksfilms, where he reviews and critiques reaction videos.

Douglass has collaborated with a variety of other YouTubers, including PewDiePie, Markiplier, RoomieOfficial, and h3h3Productions. The hundredth installment of Your Grammar Sucks includes contributions from jacksepticeye, Rhett and Link, Ryan Higa, and Vsauce. He is also known for playing the role of Intern 2 in the sitcom web show MyMusic in 2012.

== Early life ==
John Patrick "Jack" Douglass was born on June 30, 1988 to David Douglass and Donna Douglass. He grew up in Columbia, Maryland, and is primarily of Irish ancestry. During high school he started to develop a love for music, learning to play the French horn and the piano. He was raised Catholic, and attended a Catholic middle school for four years, but has since stated he is not religious, and is agnostic.

In May 2006, during his senior year of high school, he created short video sketches for a school assignment, leading him to decide to create films. The next month, he started using YouTube and uploading videos. After graduating from high school, Douglass attended American University, where he majored in film and minored in music theory.

== Internet career ==
=== 2006–2010: Early career ===
Douglass launched his main YouTube channel jacksfilms in June 2006. He first gained widespread attention after he uploaded the video "The WTF Blanket (Snuggie Parody)" in 2009, which went viral getting media attention, and remains his most-viewed video. Many of Douglass's early videos consisted of sketch comedy, music videos, or parodies, often about infomercials, and Apple or Samsung phones. Douglass has subsequently grouped these videos as part of a series called PMS (parody, music, sketch). In an interview from 2013, Douglass said he puts the "most of [his] effort" into making PMS videos and enjoy making them.

=== 2011–2021: Your Grammar Sucks ===
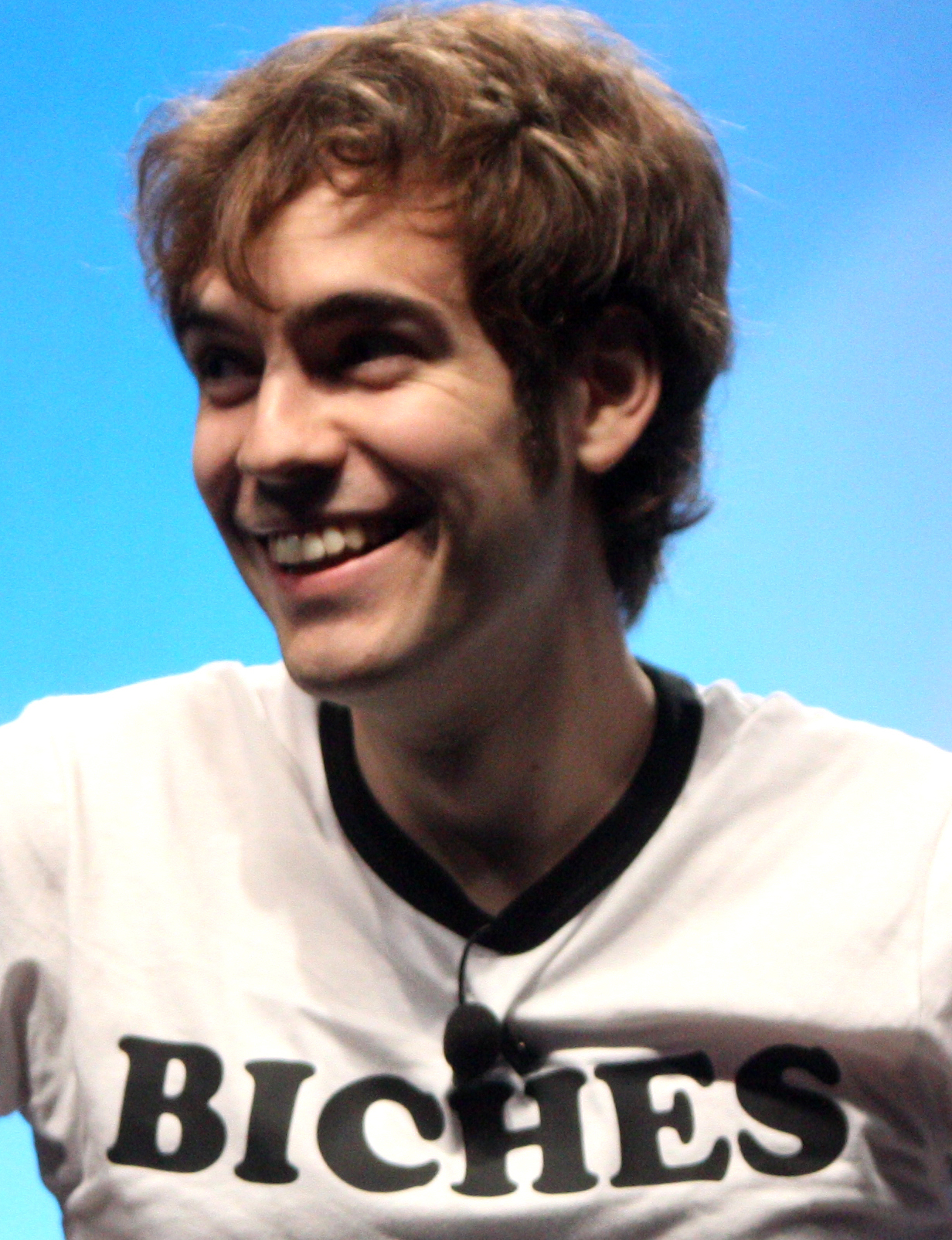
Douglass at VidCon 2012

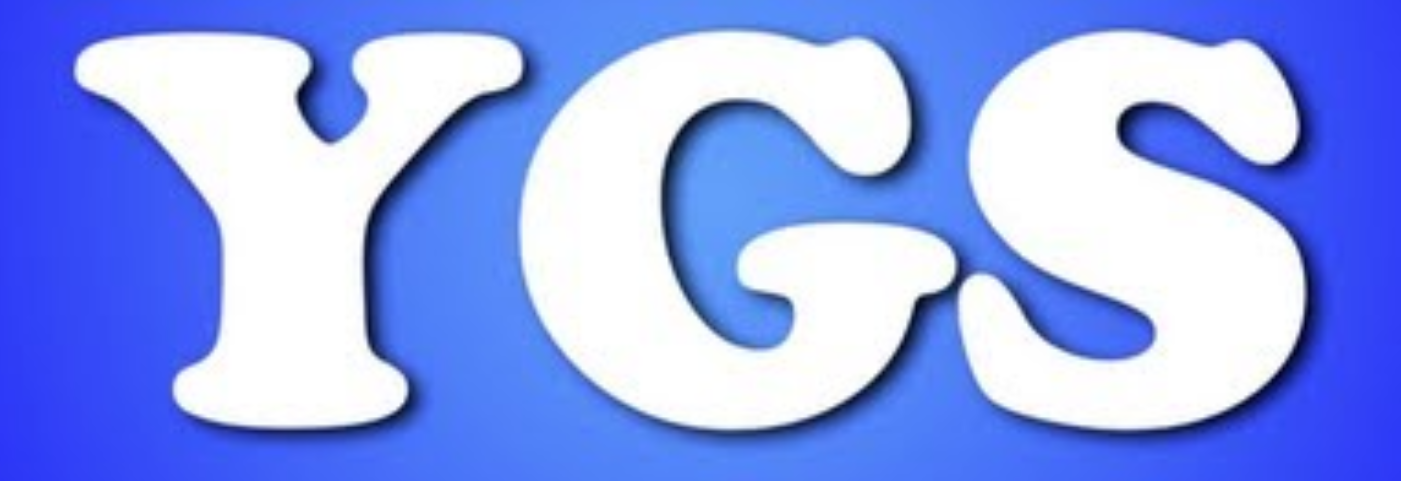
Logo used for the web series YGS since 2011

On June 20, 2011, Douglass began the series Your Grammar Sucks (YGS), mocking internet comments with excessive grammatical and spelling errors. Your Grammar Sucks would ultimately be the catalyst that jumpstarted Douglass's popularity on YouTube, and on June 27, 2013, the jacksfilms channel reached 1 million subscribers; this sits at a combined 6.18 million across his YouTube channels as of March 2024. In 2014, Douglass's channel jacksfilms was listed on NewMediaRockstars's list of the top 100 YouTube channels, ranked at #54.

A typical episode of Your Grammar Sucks is between 2 and 8 minutes long, and consists of Douglass reading the comments aloud word-for-word. Some episodes feature Douglass adapting the grammatically poor comments into a rap, a drinking game, or a sketch.

Around 2017, episodes began to be released less frequently under an inconsistent upload schedule, with plans to end the series due to repetitiveness. On May 8, 2021, Douglass switched over to the blind format where his team picks posts for him to react. On September 18, 2021, episode #145 was released, and the series came to an indefinite halt.

In 2014, Douglass created the Jackask series, where he gives satirical answers to user-submitted questions. Since the introduction of a blind format in 2021, his responses have become more genuine. As of 2024, Jackask has over 100 episodes.

=== 2015–present: Yesterday, I Asked You ===
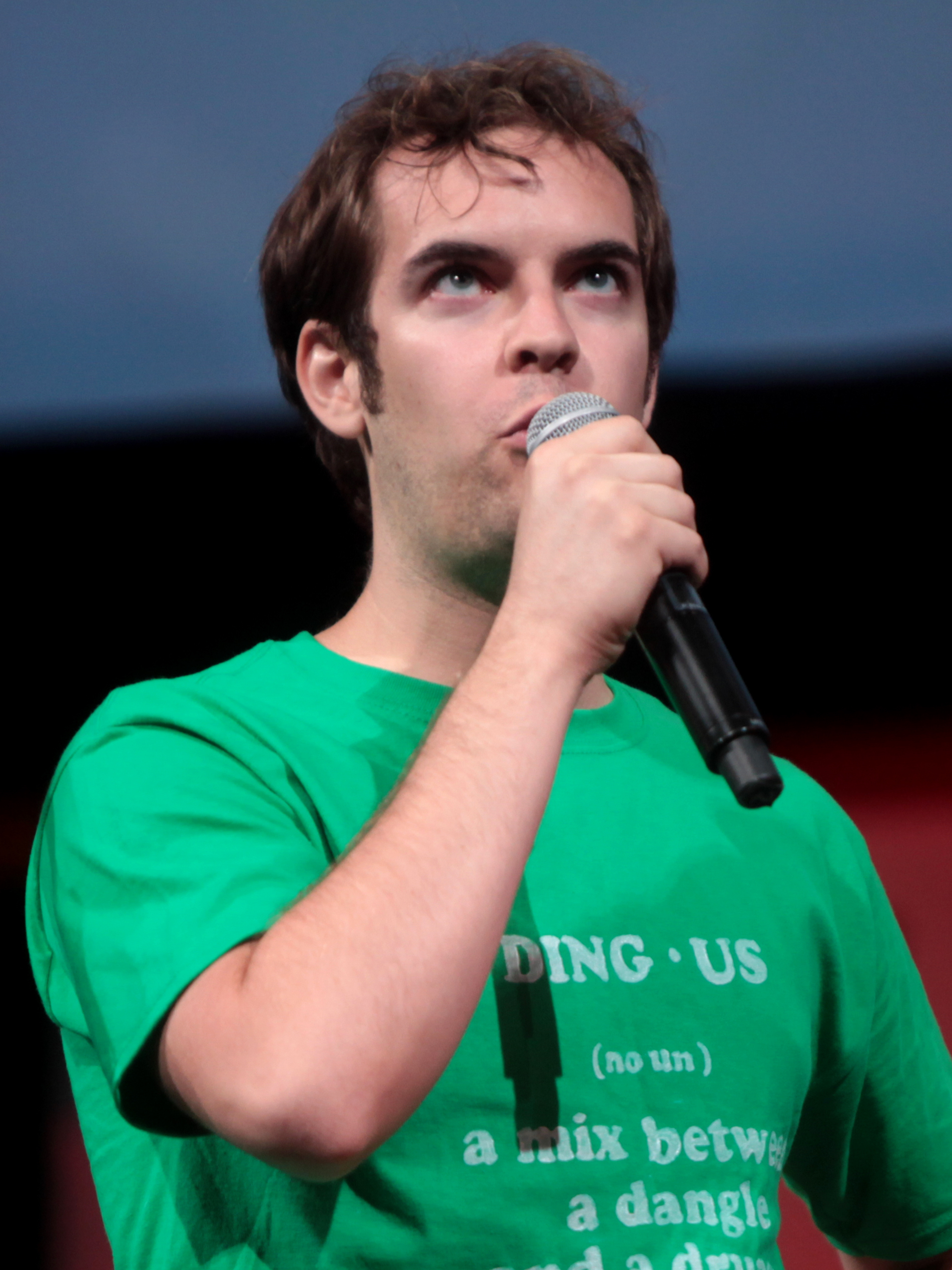
Douglass at VidCon 2014

Logo used for the web series YIAY since 2015

Douglass created the Yesterday, I Asked You (YIAY) series in 2015, which involves him asking various questions to his audience and reading his favorite responses. The series was inspired by a segment on Jackask where the roles between him and the audience were switched. Originally intended to be a daily series, as implied by the title, new episodes are now released every few days. In a typical episode, Douglass reads and reacts to answers submitted by his audience in response to a previous question. At the end of the episode, Douglass proposes a new question.

Throughout 2016 and 2017, Douglass released a series of phone commercial parodies, on the first-generation iPhone SE, Galaxy S8, and iPhone X. These parodies received media attention from CNET and Kotaku. On April 15, 2018, Douglass won the 2018 Shorty Award for YouTuber of the Year.

After Douglass made shitposts poking fun at The Emoji Movie, he received a package from the film's marketing team on July 20, 2017, thanking him for being "the #1 fan of The Emoji Movie". They invited him to the world premiere on July 23, and sent Emoji Movie–related merchandise.

Begin in 2018, Douglass has streamed regularly on Twitch. In 2019 and 2021, Douglass did two live stage tours in the US, titled YIAY Live! Live! It was in the format of the web series but adapted for a live show. Douglass launched a Kickstarter campaign for YIAY: The Board Game on October 28, 2020, transforming the YIAY video formats into a board game which combined the Cards Against Humanity format with YIAY-themed questions.

On January 4, 2021, Douglass announced YIAY TIME: The Game Show, a new YouTube Originals show. It premiered the next day on January 5, 2021, for free on Douglass's YouTube channel. The first episode was poorly received by viewers, with many criticising the sound design and lack of the series' usual adult humour. In response to this criticism, Douglass re-edited the following episodes to be more in line with what fans expect from the series.

On April 24, 2021, Douglass reworked the series to a blind format, where his team picks the answers for him to react on camera. This would be the format that he would use from then on. Following the 624th episode of YIAY, Douglass moved the series to his second channel, jackisanerd, where all subsequent episodes release. On May 17, 2022, Douglass and Galvanic Games released Be Funny Now!, a free-to-play online party game for iOS, Android, and Steam, where players compete to answer prompts in the funniest way possible. Be Funny Now! ended service in 2024.

=== 2022–present: JJJacksfilms ===
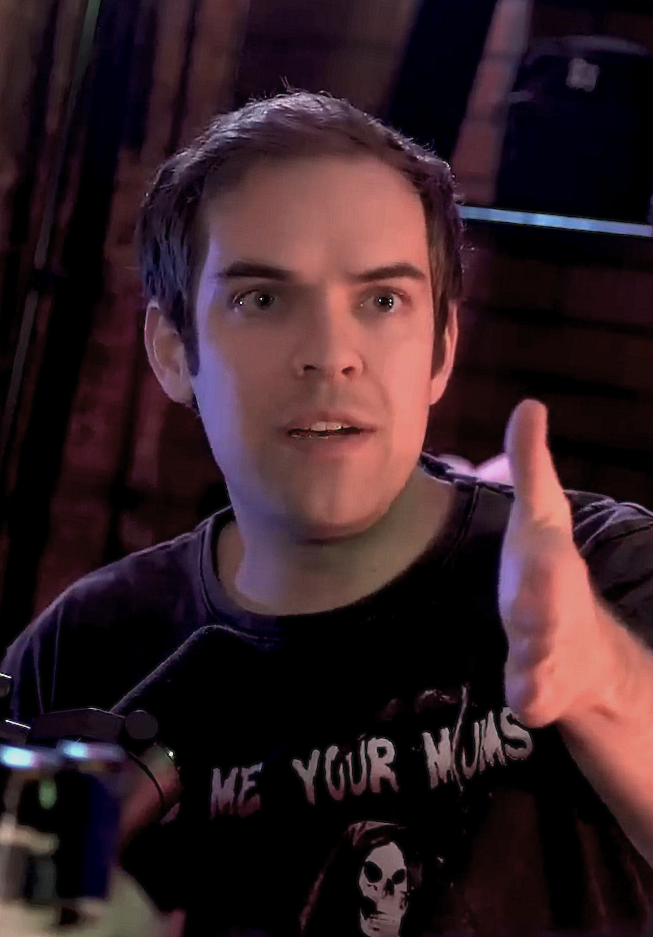
Douglass in 2019

SSSniperWolf in 2022

Since 2022, Douglass has criticized YouTuber Alia "Lia" Shelesh, better known online as SSSniperWolf, over her reaction video content. Douglass' criticisms stemmed from Shelesh's use of viral videos from TikTok without attribution. Douglass also characterized her commentary as "extremely base-level" and not sufficiently transformative to qualify as fair use. Douglass had previously engaged in similar criticisms of reaction channels and created the channel JJJacksfilms, and began uploading videos reacting to Shelesh's content. In response, Shelesh made several social media posts accusing Douglass of sexism and content theft.

On October 14, 2023, Douglass accused Shelesh of stalking and doxing after she posted information about Douglass' residence online, including recording a video of herself outside of his home on Instagram. About a week later, YouTube temporarily demonetized Shelesh's entire channel, writing on Twitter: "off-platform actions that put others' personal safety at risk harm our community & the behavior on both sides isn't what we want on YT. Hoping everyone helps move this convo to a better place." On October 20, 2023, Shelesh issued an apology to Douglass, her fanbase, and to the wider YouTube community, in the form of a Twitter post.

On November 3, 2023, Douglass posted a video to YouTube about the situation. He revealed that he and his wife had been doing "pretty rough to say the least", and said that they were scared to leave their home after the doxing, and were considering moving out. He also thanked his fans for the support after the doxing incident, and revealed his plans on repurposing the JJJacksfilms channel with a new series called Creator Bingo. He stated that viewers could send him content through a Google Form, and that he would react to it, giving constructive criticism and advice in order to better their content, along with marking a Bingo board based on what happened in the video. He continued to stress the importance of crediting the creators, providing links to videos submitted and only reacting to videos he had permission to react to. The company Nine Four Entertainment co-founded with Douglass to make a newsletter entitled Credit the Creators; the newsletter was weekly and gave shout outs to content creators with a lesser following. In 2025, Douglass mocked the AI-generated McDonald's commercial It's the Most Terrible Time of the Year in a tweet.

=== Collaborations ===
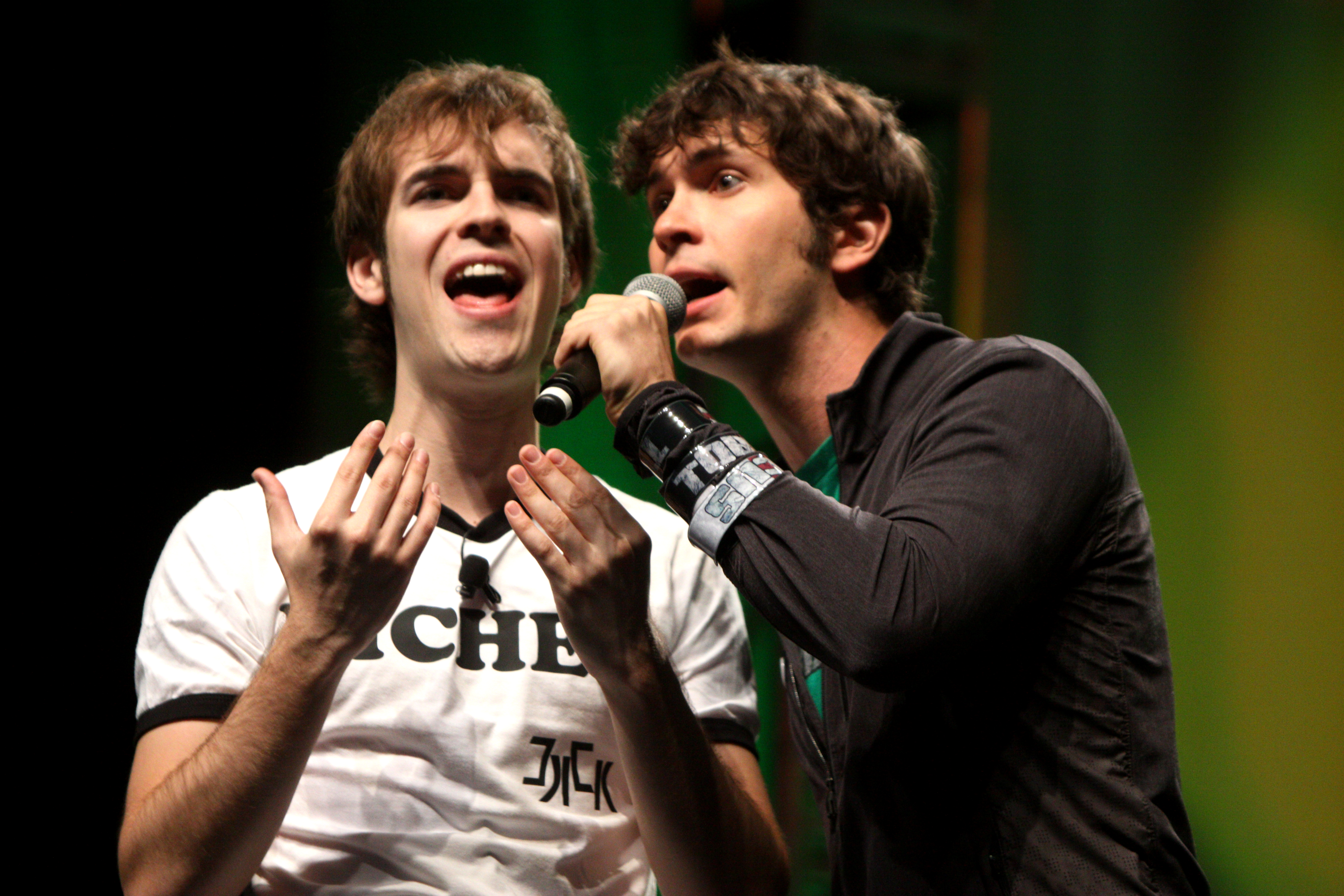
Douglass performing with Toby Turner at VidCon 2012

Though his career, Douglass has collaborated with a variety of other YouTubers. In 2011, Douglass uploaded "Take Off Your Clothes (Like Scarlett Johansson)," which featured Toby Turner and Tay Zonday. On Your Grammar Sucks, the show features many cameo appearances from other YouTubers. The 40th episode includes the Fine Brothers and Brock Baker, and the 50th includes Anthony Padilla and Ian Hecox of Smosh, Grace Helbig, and PewDiePie.

An hour-long special, Your Grammar Sucks #100, premiered on November 20, 2015. It features several other YouTubers, including jacksepticeye, Markiplier, Rhett and Link, Ryan Higa, and Vsauce. As of 2025, it remains the most viewed installment of Your Grammar Sucks to date. Others YouTubers that Douglass has collaborated with include Shane Dawson, RoomieOfficial, and h3h3Productions. (Note: H3 Podcast (July 23, 2017). H3 Podcast #17 - Jacksfilms & Internet Comment Etiquette – via YouTube.)

In 2012, Douglass played the role of Intern 2 in the sitcom web show MyMusic. In October 2015, Douglass portrayed "Pippen" in the film Bob Thunder: Internet Assassin. The film also features cameo appearances from other YouTubers. In 2016, Douglass collaborated with Lenovo to create the video "JACK to the FUTURE" to promote the Lenovo Phab 2 Pro Smartphone. Douglass was featured in the 2024 YouTube video "50 YouTubers Fight for $1,000,000" by MrBeast.

== Personal life ==
Douglass currently resides in Los Angeles, California. On April 21, 2018, Douglass married his long-time partner Erin Breslin. For their honeymoon, Douglass asked his audience on Twitter to edit his honeymoon pictures at Bora Bora for a YIAY episode. The tweets went viral and became a "Twitter Moment". They have three American Eskimo dogs which are named after ice cream snacks: Klondike, Sundae, and Chipwich. In 2021, Douglass and Breslin created a joint podcast series, Erin is the Funny One, where they discuss various topics including pop culture, tech, and celebrity news.

In 2019, Douglass described himself as agnostic, citing Angels & Demons by Dan Brown as the influence that made him question his Christian faith when he was in high school. He stated in 2026 that he was "not a religious person" and confirmed that the book "turned [him] agnostic, if not outright atheist — probably more agnostic."

== Filmography ==
Film
Year	Title	Role	Notes	Ref.
2015	Bob Thunder: Internet Assassin	Pippen		

Web
Year	Title	Role	Notes	Ref.
2011	asdfmovie			
2012–2014	MyMusic	Intern 2	Main role	
2014	16-Bit High	Jimmy Sparton	Main role	
2014	Katie	Himself	Guest	
2016–2017	YouTube Rewind	Himself		
2017	Markiplier	JacksKills	Cameo appearance ; Episode: "Darkiplier vs Antisepticeye"	
2021	Scott the Woz	Hector Andfriends	Cameo appearance; Episode: "Borderline Forever"	
2024	MrBeast	Himself (contestant)	Web special, 50 YouTubers Fight for $1,000,000	
2025	Battle for Dream Island	VR Headset	Cameo appearance; Season 5 Episode 15: "Seasonal Shift"	
TBA	Shrek 2 Retold	TBA		

== Ludography ==
Year	Game	Type	Platforms	Developer	Ref.
2021	YIAY: The Board Game	Comedy	Boardgame	YIAY team, Juniper	
2022	Be Funny Now!		Windows, MacOS, Android, iOS	Galvanic Games, New Beings	

== Awards ==
Year	Nominated	Award	Result	Ref(s)
2018	Shorty Awards	YouTuber of the Year	Won	
2018	Streamy Awards	Overall Comedy	Nominated	
2019	Streamy Awards	Comedy	Won	
