= Toby Turner =

American Internet personality and actor (born 1985)

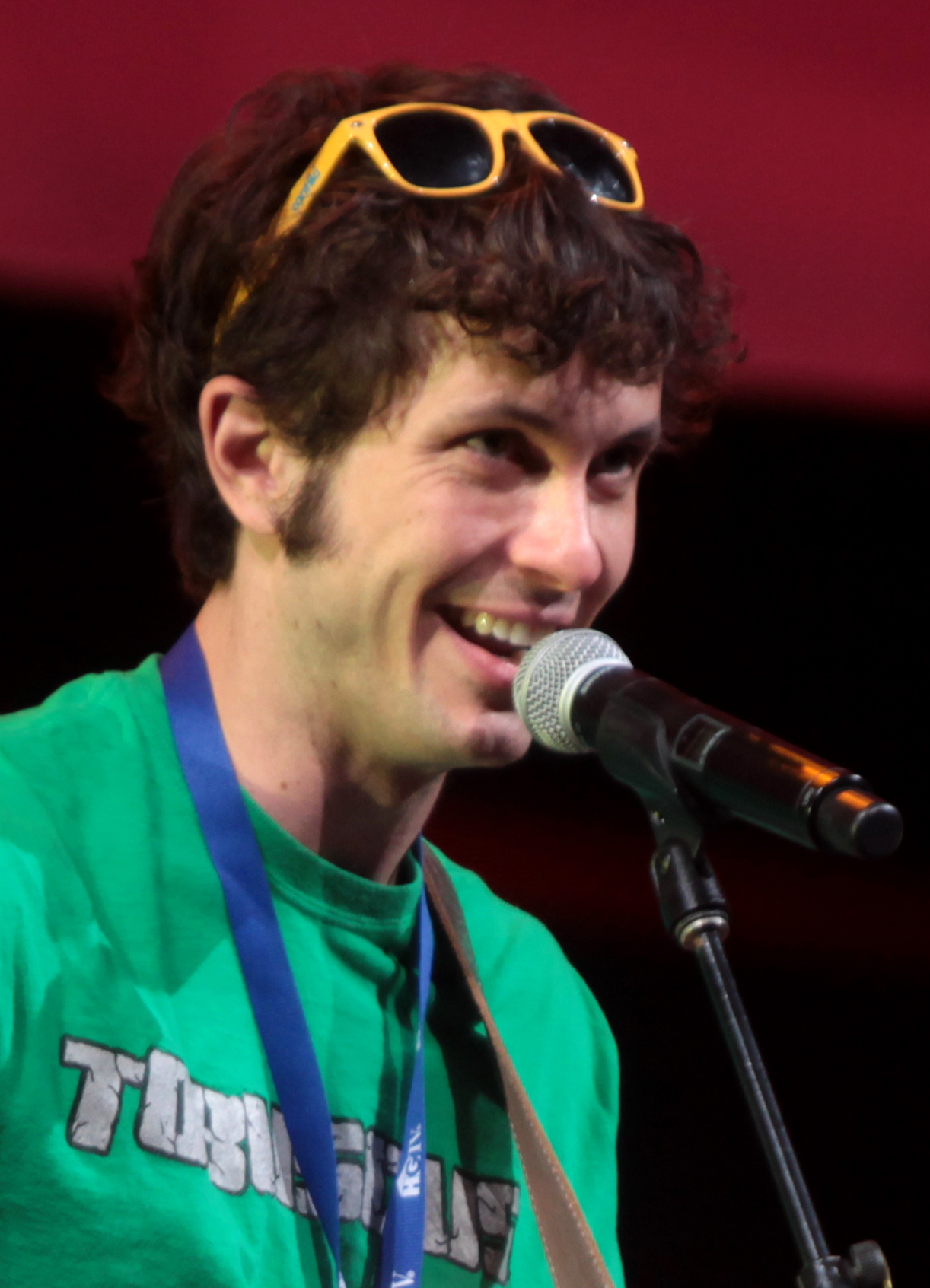
- Turner at VidCon 2014
- Born: Tobias Joseph Turner; March 3, 1985 (age 41); Mississippi, U.S.
- Other names: Tobuscus; TobyGames
- Education: Niceville High School; University of Florida
- Occupations: YouTuber; actor; comedian; musician

YouTube information
- Channels: Tobuscus; TobyGames; TobyTurner
- Years active: 2006–present
- Genres: Comedy; popular culture; vlogging; let's play; animation; music
- Subscribers: 6.06 million (Tobuscus); 6.09 million (TobyGames); 1.75 million (TobyTurner)
- Views: 1.5 billion (Tobuscus); 2.06 billion (TobyGames); 380 million (TobyTurner)
- Last updated: 2 November 2026

Tobias Joseph Turner (born March 3, 1985), also known by his stage name Tobuscus, is an American Internet personality, actor, and musician. He is best known for his YouTube videos including vlogs, Let's Plays and music. As of May 2026, Turner has a total of nearly 14 million subscribers and over 3.94 billion video views over his three YouTube channels. Turner's career has seen him work together with multiple YouTube personalities on different projects.

In 2016, several of Turner's ex-girlfriends accused him of having drugged and cheated on them throughout their relationships. Turner denied these claims, and stated he had never done anything without prior consent. Following the allegations, production of an exclusive YouTube Red series starring Turner was halted and later canceled, and several acquaintances distanced themselves from him. Turner has since voiced right-wing and anti-immigration stances on his X account, leading to mixed reception.

== Early life ==
Tobias Joseph Turner was born on March 3, 1985, in Mississippi, and grew up in Niceville, Florida. He graduated from Niceville High School, where he attended school with former Congressman Matt Gaetz and attended the University of Florida, and having an interest in filmmaking, graduated with a degree in telecommunication production. In a November 2011 vlog, Turner revealed that the name Tobuscus was given to him by one of his high school friends while performing in a play together. Turner's mother later took out a loan and bought him a video camera, an act he appreciated, as it helped begin his YouTube career.

== Career ==
=== YouTube ===
==== Main channel ====
Turner first joined YouTube on May 14, 2006, when he created a channel under the name of "Tobuscus". The first video that remains on the channel is a sketch based on the 2006 film Click. One of Turner's earliest popular videos is "Don't Tase Me, Bro!", a remixed recording of the University of Florida Taser incident in which his classmate Andrew Meyer was stunned with a taser gun by a police officer. Interviewed about the video by MTV, Turner explained that, after watching the clip, "as soon as [he] heard [Andrew] yelling, [he] knew it would fit in a hip-hop song", and that he "wanted to give [Andrew] the profits" from sales of related merchandise. The Tobuscus channel has since continued to focus on comedic skits and animated sketches, achieving recognition for those such as RIAA Gold certified "I Can Swing My Sword", "Safety Torch" and "Nugget In A Biscuit". Turner's Literal Trailers series is also one of his most popular, earning him mainstream recognition from CBS News, who described his rendition of the Dead Island trailer as "amazing" and "hilarious", and Wired, who praised Turner's Literal Trailer of Iron Man 3.

==== Vlogging and gaming channels ====
In April 2009, Turner began using his "TobyTurner" channel to upload daily unedited vlogs detailing his personal life, which he dubbed "lazy vlogs." In July 2010, Turner registered his fourth (third in use) YouTube channel under the name "TobyGames", designating it for a new series of comedic Let's Play videos. The channel has featured playthrough videos of numerous indie and AAA games since its inception, including the long-running Minecraft and Happy Wheels series.

==== Collaborations ====
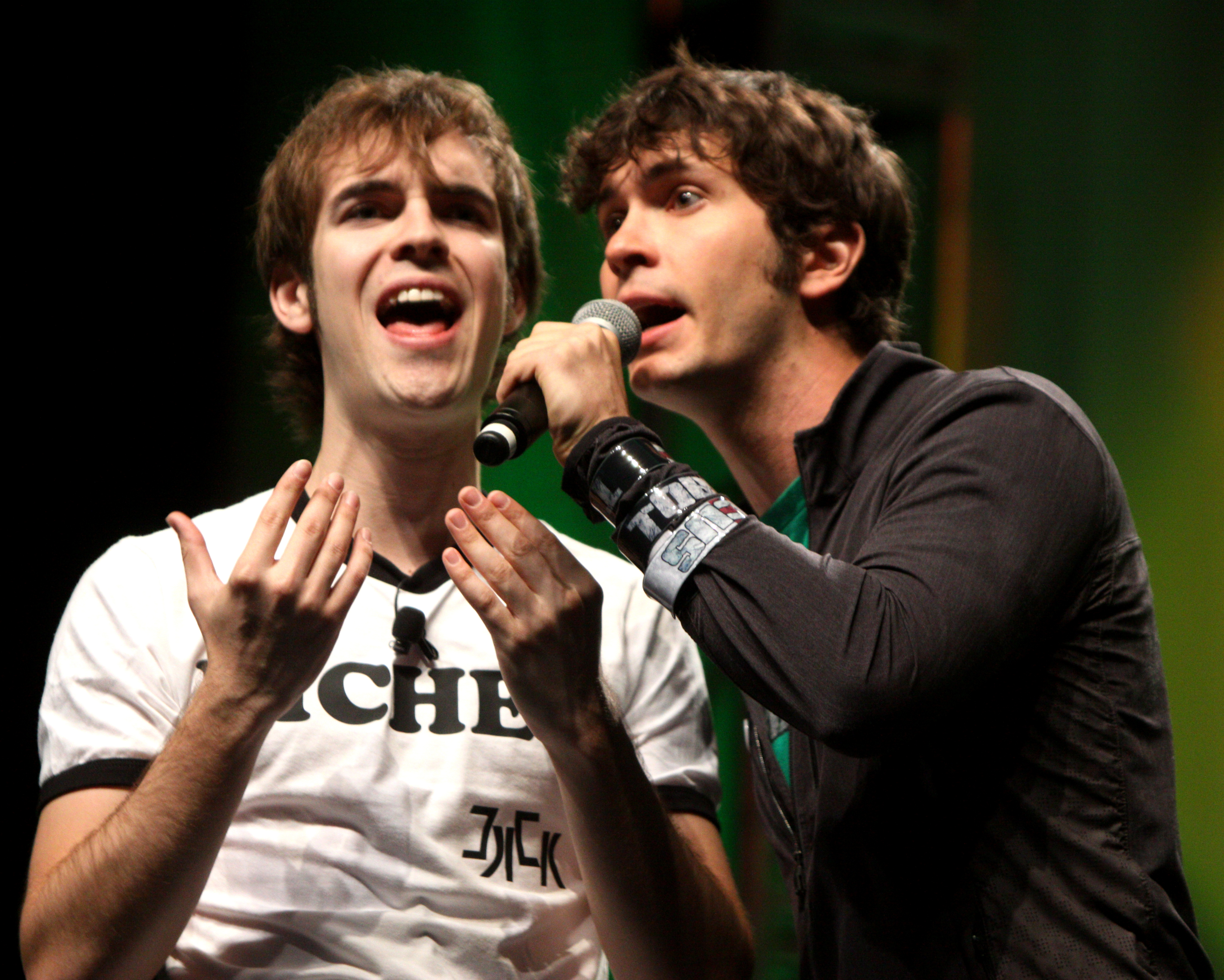
Turner performing with Jack Douglass at VidCon 2012

In addition to producing his own original content over three channels, Turner has worked together with a wide range of other YouTube personalities on various projects. In 2009, he performed a guitar collaboration with Joe Penna (MysteryGuitarMan) using two separate videos played simultaneously; in 2010 he made an appearance on the fifth episode of Annoying Orange, titled "A Cheesy Episode"; in early 2011 he worked with iJustine on a number of LittleBigPlanet 2 Let's Play videos; since 2011 he has worked on many projects with Jack Douglass, including parody "Tobjackscus", sketch "Dubstep Tobuscus", and music videos "Take Off Your Clothes (Like Scarlett Johansson)", "Razors in Your Apple (On Halloween)", and "The Valentine's Day Song"; and in 2012 he starred in a short with Olga Kay entitled Olga Kay Goes Haywire., as well as starring in an episode of the YouTube series, "Retarded Policeman". Tobuscus has also appeared alongside notable celebrities on several occasions, including the music video for the song "Whistle While I Work It", featuring Chester See and Wayne Brady. He also appeared in the three-part YouTube series "Terminator Genisys: The YouTube Chronicles" to promote the film Terminator Genisys alongside Arnold Schwarzenegger and fellow YouTubers Lilly Singh, Olga Kay, Sean Klitzner, Epic Lloyd, The Warp Zone, and Kevin Lieber of Vsauce2.

From 2010 to 2012, Turner presented a web series called CuteWinFail, created by Turner and co-produced with YouTuber Philip DeFranco and his production company FishBowl Worldwide Media. Turner and DeFranco also collaborated together on Like Totally Awesome, produced by the YouTube channel LTA. In 2010, Turner signed with the multi-channel network Machinima, before switching to Maker Studios in July 2013.

Turner also worked as a host on Tagged, a gaming-themed YouTube series produced by NODE Studios, and appeared as Satan in the Fine Brothers web series MyMusic.

In 2023, Turner voiced the character Jerod in Doug TenNapel's web series, Burkle and Spay. In 2025, he voiced a character in Cinemint's web series, Fleur de Lis.

=== Film and television ===
Turner's first feature-length film role came in 2010 romantic comedy film New Low, in which he played stand-up comedian Dave, the best friend of main character Wendell played by writer, producer and director Adam Bowers. The film was premiered at the Sundance Film Festival in January 2010, before it received coverage at the Austin Film Festival in October and at the Glasgow Film Festival the following February, and was later released on DVD in 2012. Later, in 2012, he starred in psychological horror film Smiley, written and directed by Michael Gallagher and starring fellow YouTube partner Shane Dawson. Turner also starred alongside Dawson in the 2015 comedy Bob Thunder: Internet Assassin and played a minor role in the 2015 film The Great Gilly Hopkins.

From 2012 to 2014, Turner starred in the Cartoon Network animated series The High Fructose Adventures of Annoying Orange. Turner played Nerville, the only human character who can interact with the fruits.

Turner landed a deal with YouTube Red in 2015, and began development on an original scripted comedy, I Am Tobuscus, which satirized digital stardom. Production was halted and the series cancelled in 2016 following sexual assault allegations made against Turner.

Turner was set to voice Perry, a character in 2016's The Angry Birds Movie, but his was cut from the final release.

== Other work ==
Aside from video production and other entertainment, Toby Turner has worked with a number of major companies on advertising campaigns, including NBC, Disney, and others. Among his online commercial credits are adverts for Fox crime drama series Lie to Me, footwear manufacturer and retailer Timberland, snack food product Pop-Tarts, and social network aggregation website Ouibox.

Turner has also secured hosting roles for a number of events and series, including reporting on the Toshiba "Set Me Free Tour" for MTV in August 2009 and presenting holiday special web shows for Comedy Central, Spike and VH1. In December 2012, Turner was nominated for the award of Best Host at the 2013 Streamy Awards, although eventually lost out to KassemG.

=== "Tobuscus Adventures" and "Mine the Diamond" ===
In May 2013, Turner set up a fundraising campaign on crowdfunding website Indiegogo for an iOS (and later Android) game based on his Tobuscus Adventures YouTube series, called Tobuscus Adventures: Wizards!. The fundraiser surpassed its goal of $240,000 within two days, reaching more than $644,000. The game features Turner as main character Tobuscus as he fights off hordes of zombies to get to the Wizard of Darkness, and also cameos Gabe Hohreiter as Gabuscus, and Turner's dog Gryphon. The game was released in March 2015 for iOS and later for Android, and in May 2018 for PC, with initial plans to extend it to PlayStation 4, Xbox One, and Nintendo Switch. Before the release of Tobuscus Adventures: Wizards!, Turner also revealed that a second, albeit smaller game, was in development at the same time and based on the popular sandbox game Minecraft, titled "Mine The Diamond", which was later released in June 2015 for iOS.

=== Book deal ===
In May 2014, Turner signed a three-book deal with Tegen Books, an imprint of HarperCollins, to help create an illustrated journal-style series based on Tobuscus Adventures. The first, second, and third books were set to be released in the fall of 2015, summer of 2016, and winter 2017, respectively. However, none of these books were ever published, and in September 2025, Turner finally started work on the first Tobuscus Adventures book, titled "How to Stay Positive (during the Zombie Apocalypse)".

=== "Invader Scum" and X posts ===
In June 2026, Turner published a song titled "Invader Scum" to his YouTube and X accounts, the song advocates for mass deportations of illegal immigrants in the United States, and states "We don’t want your culture, we don’t want your flags here." The song received a positive reception on X, where Turner subsequently published a series of "odd, sexual, and violent" posts following the songs virality, prompting concerns that Turner was going through a mental health crisis. The video was taken off YouTube by Turner in August of the same year.

== Reception ==
Within the first few years of his three channels running concurrently, Turner was considered one of the most popular YouTube personalities, later recognised as a "mainstay", "pioneer", and "one of the site's greatest innovators." Turner has on occasion expressed how his channels have suffered from management issues on YouTube that ultimately restricts how many video views he receives. For example, in an interview with Heavy in 2018 and a video uploaded in 2019 titled Dear Algorithm, he stated that content creators such as himself were occasionally not appearing in subscribers feeds and as a result the majority of his subscribers were not notified when he uploaded new content. Turner has also attempted to reach out to YouTube directly, such as in 2017 tweeting to their administration that neither the subscribe button nor the more recently introduced bell icon, which immediately notified subscribers of new uploads, were working properly at the time.

Harrison Jacobs of Business Insider in 2014, meanwhile, wrote of how Turner had been pursuing various projects outside of YouTube. He found that while he still published frequently to his channels, he seemed particularly devoted to other work in the hope that it could direct him into more "traditional media", citing Turner's first book based on his web series Tobuscus Animated Adventures, as well as his mobile game Tobuscus Adventures: Wizards!. Jacobs noted how the development of the game had run over-budget, despite having received more than double the requested funds, and had been met with a number of delays, which Turner himself ascribed to a lack of experience.

== Personal life ==
Turner began his career in Niceville before moving to Los Angeles in 2008. As of 2026, he resides in Nevada. Turner has speculated that he may have ADHD. In 2024, Turner identified his political views as "liberal and conservative". He expressed support for Donald Trump in the 2020 and 2024 United States presidential elections.

=== Sexual assault allegations ===
On April 8, 2016, April Fletcher, known online as AprilEfff, made several allegations against Turner, including that he was addicted to drugs (including MDMA), that he had cheated on several of his former partners (including Fletcher), and that he drugged and raped her in February 2013. Writing a blog post on Tumblr, Fletcher claimed that she had contemplated suicide following the episodes, and that Turner had likely committed the same acts against other women. Amelia Talon, a YouTuber and ex-girlfriend of Turner, corroborated Fletcher's accounts shortly after, alleging that she had been drugged by Turner as well. On April 9, 2016, Jaclyn Glenn, another of Turner's ex-girlfriends, posted a video on YouTube responding to the allegations. Glenn claimed that Turner had affairs in their relationship, and that while she thought the rape allegations were possible, she personally believed that they were untrue. Former Turner girlfriends Olga Kay and Melanie Murphy both denied that they were ever assaulted by Turner, though Murphy admitted Turner was not faithful to her. While not endorsing the rape allegations, both former Turner girlfriend Tara Babcock and former collaborator with Turner, Philip DeFranco, attested that Turner has a drug problem, is non-monogamous in his relationships and needs mental help.

Turner responded to the accusations on April 11, 2016, in a short video, in which he dubbed Fletcher's claims as false and claimed that he had "never done anything without her consent [and] never tried to trick her into anything". On June 14, 2018, Turner released another video titled "#MeToo ...late?" where he claims he was advised not to say anything when the Tumblr post was published, then proceeds to give his accounts of what happened. In the video, Turner instead claimed that he and Fletcher had never been in a relationship, despite previously stating they had dated. Turner states that one night, he had simply let a friend (Fletcher) sleep over at his house, due to her insisting she was too afraid to return home that late at night. He also claimed that Fletcher wanted a romantic relationship with him, while he wanted only to remain friends. Turner also suggests Fletcher hinted at making a Tumblr post falsely accusing him of rape.

== Filmography ==
Film
Year	Title	Role	Notes
2010	New Low	Dave	Lead role
2012	Smiley	Mark	Supporting role
2015	The Great Gilly Hopkins	Ticket Agent	Supporting role
2015	Bob Thunder: Internet Assassin	Himself	Supporting role
2016	The Angry Birds Movie	Perry	Supporting role, cut from final film
2016	Why Him?	Party Guest	Supporting role
2017	The F*** Happened	Reynolds	Supporting role
Television
Year	Title	Role	Notes
2008	Stranger Things	Father Michael Hutchins	Pilot episode
2008	Stranger Things	Listen	One episode
2012–2014	The High Fructose Adventures of Annoying Orange	Nerville, Mega Suck, Smithins	Series regular
2015	Law & Order: Special Victims Unit	Game host	Episode: "Intimidation Game"
2016	American Dad!	Duncan	Episode: "Portrait of Francine's Genitals"
Web
Year	Title	Role	Notes
2009	Russian Recommendations	Roman	Video shorts
2010	True Stories from My Crappy Childhood	Himself	Video short
2010	Annoying Orange	Cheese, Bread, Eggplant, Russel the Brussel Sprout, Tangerine, Oyster, and Spike the Durian.	Various episodes
2010	BlackBoxTV Presents	Keith	One episode
2012	Olga Kay Goes Haywire	Himself	Video short
2012	MyMusic	Satan	Series regular
2012	FART with Toby Turner – Retarded Policeman #34	Himself	Video short
2013	Dead Island: No Retreat	Sam	Video short
2013	Ear Troll (w/ Tobuscus)	Ear Troll	Video short
2013	Animeme Rap Battles	Courage Wolf (voice)	Music video
2013	Whistle While I Work It	Himself	Music video
2013	Animeme Rap Battles	Courage Wolf (voice)	Music video
2015	Terminator Genisys: The YouTube Chronicles	T-360	Video short
2017	Hyperlinked	Almond Butter Guy	Web series
2023	Burkle and Spay	Jerod	Web series, two episodes
2025	Fleur de Lis	Firefighter	Web series, cameo
Video games
Year	Title	Role	Notes
2015	Tobuscus Adventures: Wizards (Note: Renamed to Wizards: Wand of Epicosity on Steam)	Tobuscus (voice)	Also creator
2015	Mine The Diamond	Tobuscus (voice)	Also creator
