= Lee Newton =

American comedian and YouTuber

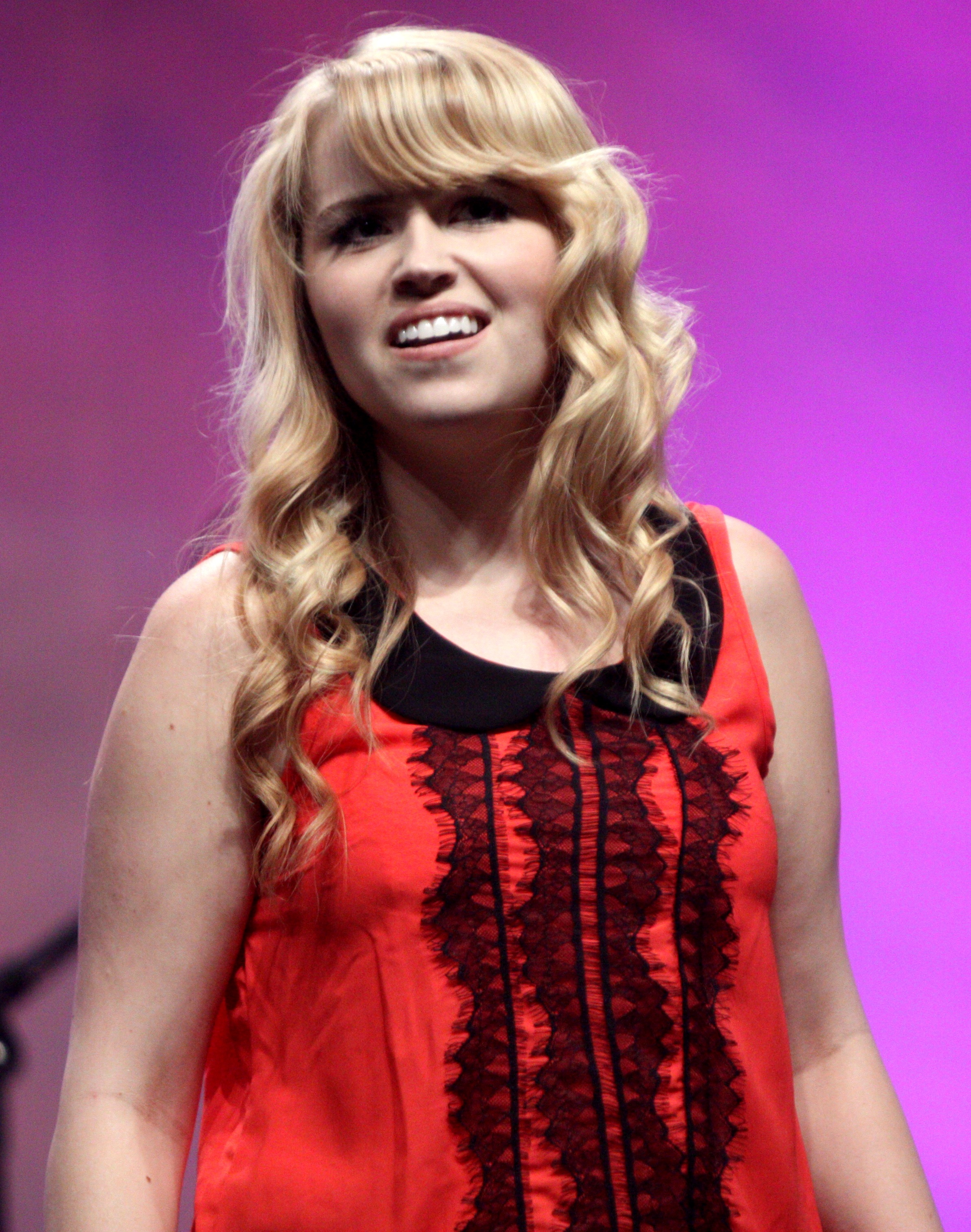
- Newton at VidCon 2012
- Born: Ashley Rose Newton; April 13, 1985 (age 41); Oregon, U.S.
- Occupations: Actress, comedian, web personality
- Years active: 2007–present
- Notable work: SourceFed, The Valleyfolk

YouTube information
- Channel: lee newton
- Genre: Vlog
- Subscribers: 123K
- Views: 2.6 million
- Last updated: April 4, 2026

Ashley Rose Newton (born April 13, 1985), known professionally as Lee Newton, is an American actress, comedian and Web personality. She is a former co-host of the YouTube news channel SourceFed, as well as a regular performer of The Gym Comedy group. Newton studied theatre in college, and is an alumna of The Groundlings Sunday Company. Newton was a founding member of the production company and web-series known as The Valleyfolk, in which she was a co-host alongside fellow former SourceFed hosts Joe Bereta, Elliott Morgan, and Steve Zaragoza.

== Early life ==
Lee Newton was raised in Coarsegold, California. She believes that she is "a blend of her Father's wit and sarcasm and her Mother's absolute absurdity." She also has a brother and a sister. Her brother, Jake, is a musician, and has his own YouTube channel. On March 2, 2012, a video was posted to her brother Jake Newton's YouTube channel of the two singing a song cover of Whitney Houston's "I Wanna Dance With Somebody".

Newton was born with several congenital heart defects, including a ventricular septal defect, an atrial septal defect, transposition of the great vessels, and pulmonic stenosis. She has undergone 4 open heart surgeries between the ages of 14 days and 13 years old. Due to this, Newton has often said that she is an advocate of people donating organs.

Newton studied theatre in college after receiving a theatre directed scholarship.

Newton is a comedian who performed short skits and improv at the Gym Comedy Group. Newton is also known for being an alumna of The Groundlings' Sunday Company.

== Online career ==
=== SourceFed and MyMusic (2012−2015) ===
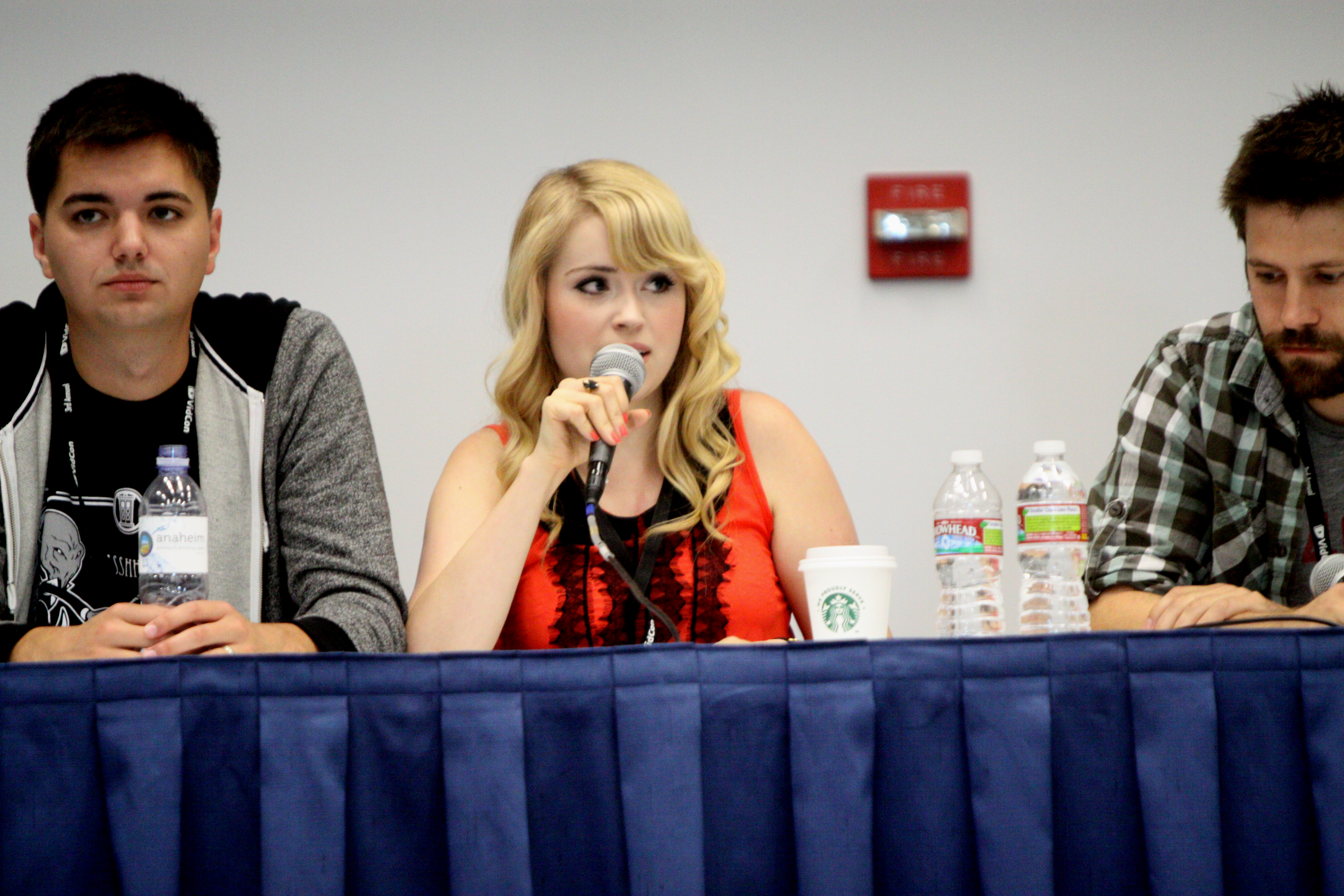
From left to right: Morgan, Newton, and Bereta, the original three hosts of SourceFed

Newton first rose to prominence online as the co-host of SourceFed, a YouTube pop culture & news channel. The channel was one of the first 100 YouTube premium channels.

On February 6, 2012, Lee Newton's fellow co-hosts, Elliott Morgan and Joe Bereta, released a video to the SourceFed YouTube channel, concerning the list of Maxim's Hot 100, which is released every year. Without Lee knowing, her co-hosts encouraged the viewers to vote for her as a 'write-in'. The decision to do this was the overwhelming response from other SourceFed videos; specifically AskMen's Top 99 Most Desirable Women of 2012. The feedback contained comments that thought Newton should be included in these lists. The Maxim voting website added a CAPTCHA after a flood of votes for her. On April 3, Maxim posted a list of the most popular 'write-in' candidates, and included Lee Newton, writing that she had 'list potential'. In result, she reached #57 in Maxim's Hot 100. The following year, Newton received a Maxim profile.

Newton has been interviewed on two occasions by New Media Rockstars, along with her SourceFed co-hosts. In an interview with the online publication, Newton stated "I think we lucked out having a team of hosts that really got along very well and had Phil’s vision, and we’re able to piggyback on that really quickly because he has such a clear vision, and he knew exactly what he wanted and such a concise idea of what he wanted and then having four people who really like each other and who can write really well. It was just energy. It was a collaboration that really started to take off." The statement was in response to the SourceFed YouTube channel reaching 500,000 subscribers.

In March 2013, Newton appeared alongside SourceFed co-host Steve Zaragoza and creator Philip DeFranco in a Taco Bell advertisement. Later, in May, SourceFed launched a spin-off channel, "SourceFed Nerd", on which Newton also appeared.

Also in May 2013, Newton appeared in an episode of the Fine Brothers's YouTubers React, alongside SourceFed co-host, Steve Zaragoza. Newton would again work with the Fine Brothers as she joined the cast of MyMusic for its second season. On the series, Newton played the character of Country, Idol's cousin. Newton also appeared in Toby Turner's Heely Cops video.

Newton made appearances on YouTube channels outside of SourceFed and Fine Brothers-related series; Newton appeared in the ninth episode of Rhett and Link's The Mythical Show, along with Bereta and Morgan. Newton also voice acted as Tanya Burkowitz and Katelynn Zales in the stop-motion animated web series The Most Popular Girls in School, in 2013.

On March 28, 2015, Newton appeared in her last video before her resignation from SourceFed, alongside former SourceFed host Ross Everett.

=== The Valleyfolk (2018−2019) ===
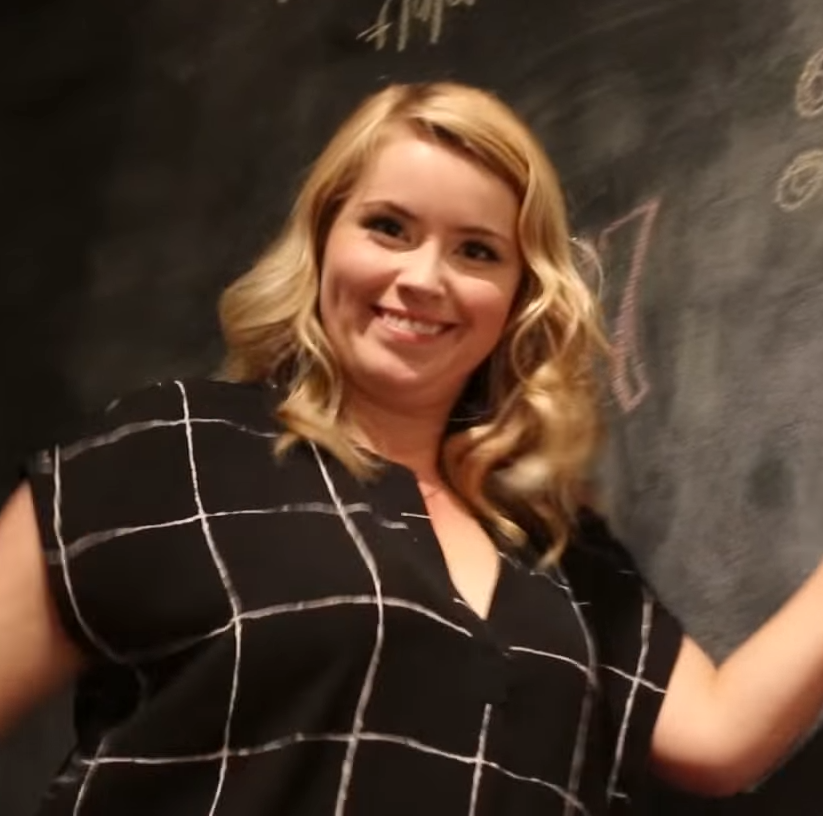
Newton appearing in a Vlogbrothers video in 2016

In 2018, Newton along with founding SourceFed hosts Joe Bereta, Elliott Morgan, and Steve Zaragoza, launched a production company and YouTube channel entitled "The Valleyfolk". The Valleyfolk features various series. Among them are The Valleycast, a podcast series, and Your Show, a variety series. The Valleyfolk competed on the NBC comedy competition show Bring the Funny, winning the show's first season in 2019. On September 23, 2019, the other members of The Valleyfolk voted to terminate Newton's employment with the group.

== Television appearances ==
Aside from online works, Newton appeared in the 2014 April Fools episode of Tosh.0. That July, Newton was announced to be included in the cast of Comedy Central's series, CC: Social Scene.

Newton hosted the Lip Sync Battle Preshow with Elliott Morgan for Spike.

== Awards and nominations ==
Awards and nominations as part of SourceFed
Year	Award Show	Category	Result	Recipient(s)
2013	3rd Streamy Awards	Best News and Culture Series	Nominated	SourceFed
2013	3rd Streamy Awards	Best Live Series	Nominated	SourceFed: The Nation Decides 2012
2013	3rd Streamy Awards	Best Live Event	Nominated	SourceFed: #PDSLive 2012 Election Night Coverage
2013	3rd Streamy Awards	Audience Choice for Series of the Year	Won	SourceFed
2014	4th Streamy Awards	News and Current Events Series	Won	SourceFed
2014	4th Streamy Awards	Gaming	Nominated	SourceFed Nerd
2014	4th Streamy Awards	Show of the Year	Nominated	SourceFed

== See also ==
- Bree Essrig
- Maude Garrett
- Meg Turney
