= Elliott Morgan =

America comedian, actor and writer (born 1987)

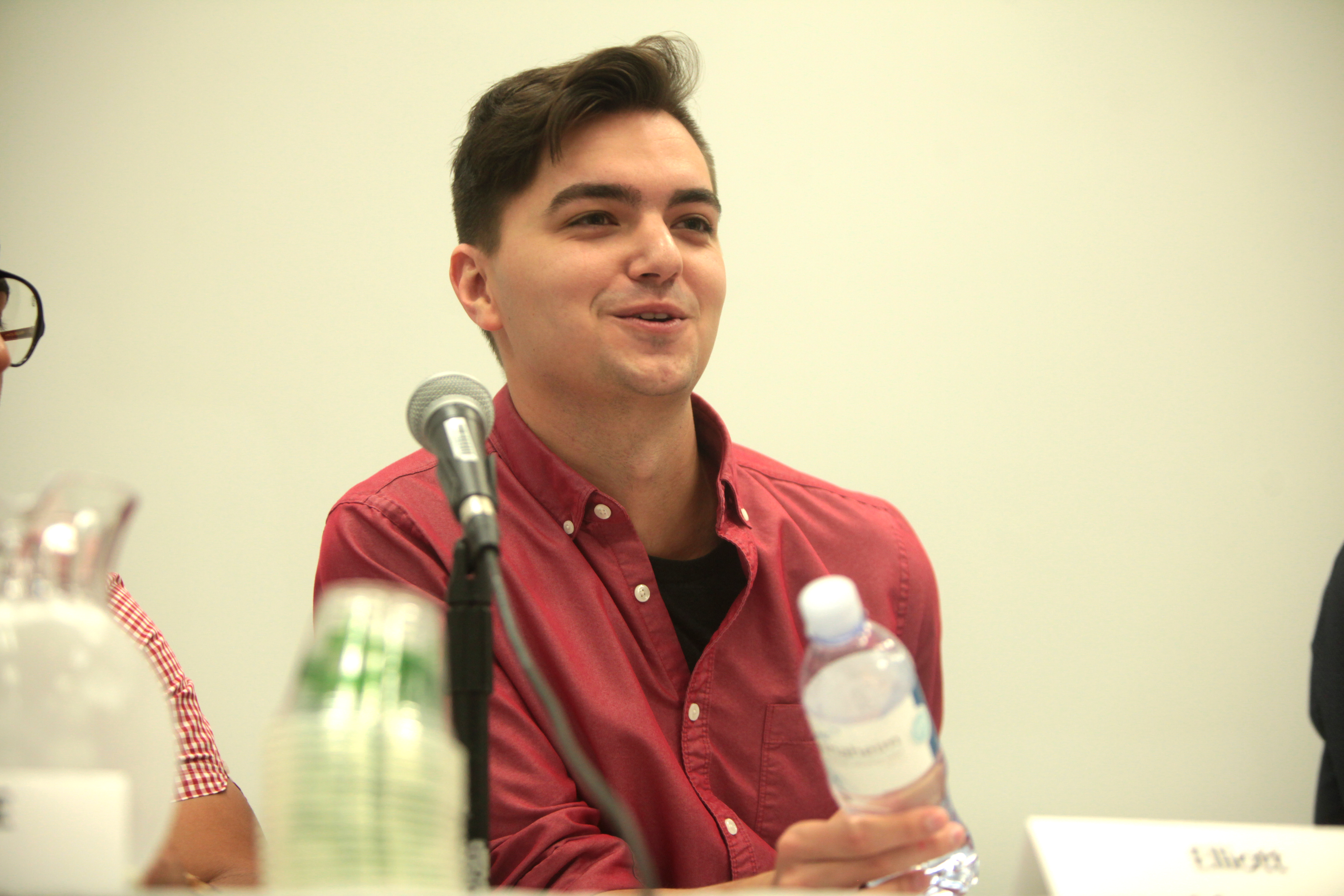
- Morgan in 2014
- Born: Elliott Christopher Morgan; February 22, 1987 (age 39); Winter Haven, Florida, U.S.
- Education: University of Florida (BS)
- Occupations: Comedian; actor; writer; producer; host; internet personality
- Spouses: Tiffany Morgan (m. 2007; div. 2017) Grace Helbig (m. 2022)

YouTube information
- Channel: Elliott Morgan
- Years active: 2012–present
- Genres: Politics; news; vlogs
- Subscribers: 138 thousand
- Views: 1.51 million
- Last updated: September 11, 2025

Elliott Christopher Morgan (born February 22, 1987) is an American comedian, actor, writer, host, producer and YouTube personality. Morgan is best known for being a co-host of the YouTube channel SourceFed. Morgan attended the University of Florida.

== Early life ==
Morgan was born on February 22, 1987. Morgan attended the Lois Cowles Harrison Center for the Visual and Performing Arts, graduating in 2005, and the University of Florida, graduating in 2009 with a Bachelor of Science in zoology.

== Career ==
=== SourceFed years (2012–2014) ===
In 2011, YouTube began its funding of original channels, which was launched in 2012. One of these channels was SourceFed, which was created by YouTube celebrity Philip DeFranco, who also created the popular Philip DeFranco Show. DeFranco hired three hosts, Morgan being one of them, to write, produce, and present news videos that would be known as 20 Minutes or Less. The series would later be known as SourceFed, named after the channel. Morgan was hired after he came into casting and DeFranco "instantly fell in love" with him and SourceFed co-host Lee Newton. Around the channel's launch, Morgan began posting videos on his personal channel as well. SourceFed began airing other programs, such as One on One, which Morgan was a recurring host on. The channel grew, reaching 500,000 subscribers in August 2012. In June, Morgan obtained management representation with The Collective. Later in the year, Morgan joined DeFranco and SourceFed co-host Meg Turney during the channel's live program, Election Night 2012 #PDSLive. Morgan also appeared in videos breaking down political parties and debates, as part of YouTube's "Election Hub".

In 2013 the SourceFed channel and its live event during YouTube's Election Hub were nominated for a total of four Streamy Awards, winning the Audience Choice for Best Series. Morgan's podcast, The Morganism, launched on March 20, 2013, debuted at #23, and peaked at #10 on the U.S. iTunes charts.

On July 22, Morgan launched a new show on his personal channel, "Happy Hour", in which he broaches a topic stand-up comedy style all the while drinking a beverage "someone over the age of 21 would drink, or someone under the age of 2." In November, Morgan began a series of guest co-host appearances on the webseries Live from E!, one of which was replayed on TV on the E! Network on November 11, 2013.

"It's like, there's a line from Jeff Winger in last week's Community episode, which you should watch if you haven't, where Jeff Winger says, 'Yeah, I mean it's over, but on the other hand it's over.'"

— Morgan discussing his departure from SourceFed, 2014.

On April 2, 2014, Elliott announced his resignation from the SourceFed channel on his Facebook fan page, writing, "This is one of the most difficult decisions I've ever made and certainly the most bittersweet. I absolutely love the people I work with, and I'm incredibly proud of the content we’ve created over the past two plus years, not to mention the amazing audience that has supported me." During his time on SourceFed, Morgan appeared on the popular Internet series Annoying Orange as Special Agent Cheese, on the web series H.A.C.K.S. as Lucas, and on an episode of SoulPancake's The FlipSide as Ryan. Aside from appearing, producing, and writing several Internet series, Morgan also appeared in the television series Marvin Marvin.

=== Post-SourceFed (2014–present) ===
On April 11, 2014, Morgan hosted his final video on the SourceFed channel. After his departure, Morgan continued his Happy Hour vlog series, which regularly featured several other SourceFed personalities, until October 2015. On April 12, 2014, Morgan began hosting the newly-launched Mashable Minute on Mashable's YouTube channel, a series produced by Collective Digital Studio. Morgan later hosted Monumental, a second online series produced by CDS under Mashable's online catalogue.

In October 2014, Morgan began hosting the weekly series, Misconceptions, on the Mental Floss YouTube channel. In addition to this series, Morgan began occasionally appearing in "Mental Floss: List" videos and continued to do so after "Misconceptions" aired its final episode on February 19, 2016.

In 2015, Morgan made a temporary return to SourceFed as the host of a weekly series called The Study. Prior to its debut, Morgan described the satire news/talk show as one that would feature “tight writing, irreverent humor, and a lot of dumb vape pen smoke.” The Study premiered on August 22, 2015, and maintained high viewership until its final episode, entitled "Elliott C. Morgan Gets Cancelled!", was released on April 23 of 2016. In the same year, Morgan hosted a short-lived online revival of classic game show Beat the Clock(featuring various internet personalities as contestants) for YouTube's online channel Buzzr until 2016.

In December 2015, Morgan recorded his first stand up comedy special entitled "Premature". The special premiered on Vimeo On-Demand December 10, with SUPERGRAVITY Pictures producing. The hour-long show included material outside of the usual from Morgan, but was well-received. Morgan used this special to kick-off his comedy tour while still regularly updating his personal YouTube channel and appearing as a guest on other channels.

In the fall of 2016 Morgan once again took his comedy act on tour, alongside former SourceFed cohost Mike Falzone and friend Andrew Delman. In the same year Morgan began a comedy podcast with former SourceFed cohost Lee Newton, titled Shooting Stars. The show ran from March 2016 until August 2017.

Since 2017, Morgan has been a collaborator with YouTube channel Sugar Pine 7, appearing in their Alternative Lifestyle vlog series, as well as their short horror film, The Woods, in October 2017.

In December 2017, Morgan appeared in an hour-long TLC special called I Catfished My Kid. Inspired by MTV's Catfish, I Catfished My Kid follows host Elliott Morgan as he guides parents through a confrontation with their children regarding their internet activity.

In early 2018, Morgan began performing alongside Andrew Delman, Mike Falzone, Lee Newton, and others at Hollywood Improv as part of the show "Delman's Definitely Not Star Search".

Morgan launched a new YouTube channel and production company The Valleyfolk, with friends and founding SourceFed members Steve Zaragoza, Lee Newton, and Joe Bereta on January 8, 2018. As part of the channel he hosts a feature show called Hot Take, which combines real-world news reporting with satirical commentary.

Later in 2018, Morgan joined his friend Peter Rollins to start The Fundamentalists, a podcast where they discuss philosophy, comedy, and “life before death”.

In 2019, the Valleyfolk competed on the NBC comedy competition show Bring the Funny, winning the show's first season.

On October 1 of 2019, Morgan released his second comedy special, titled Holy Shit. The special explores Morgan's religious upbringing and transition into the lifestyle of Hollywood, and was filmed in one continuous shot. The hour-long special was directed by Sharon Everitt and produced by FilmSignal.

== Personal life ==
Morgan married in 2007 when he was 20 years old (proposing at 19) to his wife, Tiffany, whom he met at 14. Elliott announced on his podcast Shooting Stars that he and Tiffany had separated in September 2015 and their divorce became final in June 2017.

On October 17, 2016, Morgan published a video endorsing Gary Johnson for President in the 2016 election. This video was primarily a response to Casey Neistat's video endorsing Hillary Clinton.

Morgan volunteers weekly with the Born to Act Players, a Los Angeles-based charity that teaches acting and improv to special needs students.

In early 2019, he announced via Instagram that he and fellow YouTuber and comedian Grace Helbig were dating. On February 28, 2021, Morgan announced via Instagram that he and Helbig were engaged. On October 2, 2022, both Helbig and Morgan announced via Instagram they had married the day before.
