= Steve Zaragoza =

American internet celebrity (born 1982)

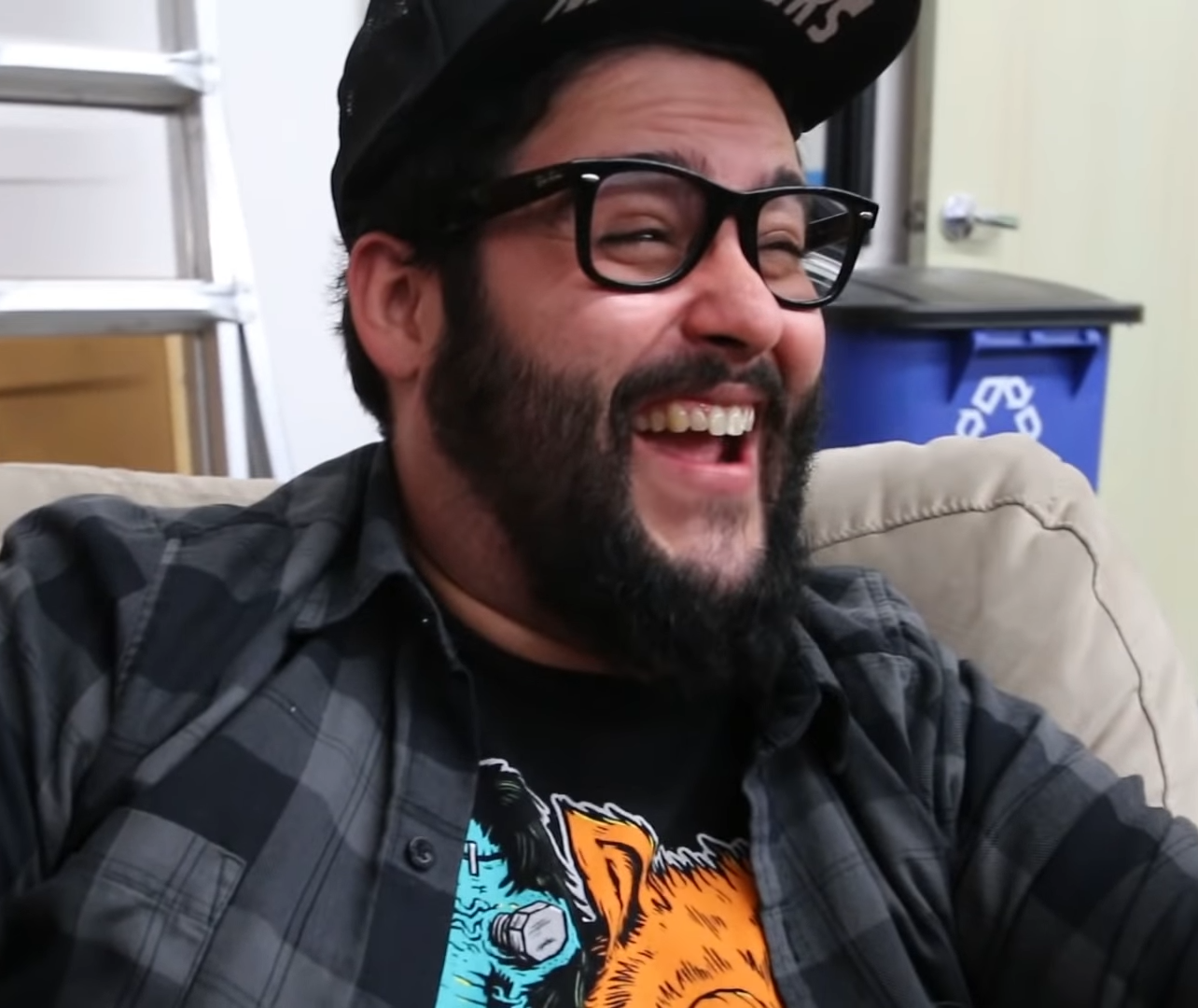
- Zaragoza in 2016
- Born: Esteban Zaragoza; June 9, 1982 (age 44); Oxnard, California, U.S.
- Occupations: YouTube personality, host, creative producer, singer-songwriter, musician, actor, podcaster
- Years active: 2009–present
- Employer(s): The Valleyfolk, Comic-Con HQ, Phil DeFranco Networks & Merchandise (former)
- Notable work: SourceFed, The Valleyfolk
- Style: Current events, gaming, nerd culture, surrealist

YouTube information
- Channel: stevezaragoza
- Genres: Vlogging; Film review
- Subscribers: 107 thousand
- Views: 4.4 million
- Last updated: August 30, 2024

Esteban "Steve" Zaragoza (born June 9, 1982) is an American online personality, singer-songwriter, musician and web series host, notable for his work on the current events and news series SourceFed. Zaragoza became a host on the series in 2012. The following year, Zaragoza became a host on its spin-off channel, SourceFedNERD. On his personal YouTube channel, Zaragoza frequently combines or crosses between dark, deadpan, surreal, character, and sketch comedy in a non-sequitur fashion.

== Early career ==
Zaragoza's first appearance was in 2008 for a music video by Buckcherry titled "Too Drunk...". Zaragoza received a sound department credit for Cloudy with a Chance of Meatballs (2009). In 2011, Zaragoza appeared on an episode of the television series, 1000 Ways to Die. Prior to SourceFed, Zaragoza worked as a sound designer at Sony.

== Online projects ==
Making his first appearance on March 1, 2012, Zaragoza joined SourceFed early on as a recurring host, before developing into a full-time co-host. Zaragoza would become ingrained with the SF community, appearing at live meetups and being interviewed by online publications. In February 2013, Zaragoza, along with Philip DeFranco & his SourceFed co-hosts at the time, were awarded the Audience Choice Streamy Award. In May, Zaragoza became a co-host on the spin-off channel, SourceFedNERD. In August 2013, Zaragoza joined boss Philip DeFranco and co-host Meg Turney in the meetup event, "DeFranco Loves Dat AZ". Zaragoza would appear at VidCon 2014, as well.

In September 2014, Zaragoza co-hosted a video with Lee Newton, focusing on charities refusing donations from Reddit following the leaks of celebrities' nude photographs, which Reddit commonly referred to as "The Fappening." According to StatSheep, the SourceFed channel lost over 20,000 subscribers due to the video, which were quickly recovered. Days later, Zaragoza along with the rest of the SourceFed crew were awarded the Streamy for Best News & Current Events series.

Zaragoza starred as the male lead, Paul Schue-Horyn, in the 2020 YouTube miniseries Wayward Guide created by the Tin Can Bros. The series features many notable supporting stars, such as Darren Criss, Sean Astin, and Carlos Valdes.

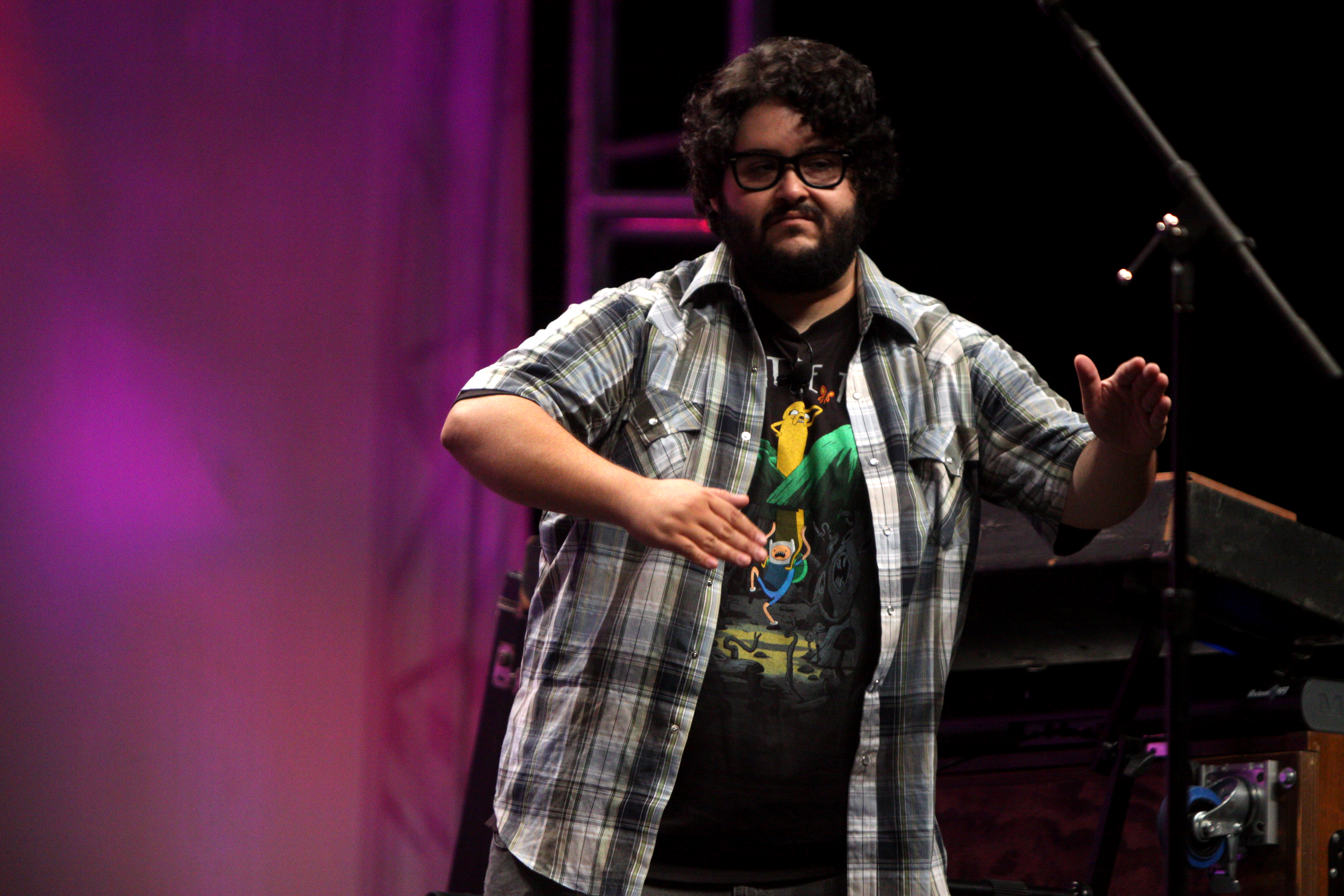
Zaragoza at VidCon 2012

Aside from hosting series for Phil DeFranco Networks & Merchandise, Zaragoza has frequently collaborated with YouTube personality Dane Boedigheimer. Zaragoza has been a recurring guest voice actor on Boedigheimer's Annoying Orange. Zaragoza also appeared as the lead role on The Misfortune of Being Ned, and on the pilot episode of Orange spin-off, The Marshmallow Show. PBS Newshour would publish an article commenting on Zaragoza's reception of Taco Bell's breakfast waffle taco.

In 2014, Zaragoza appeared in SoulPancake's The FlipSide series. Zaragoza was also announced to play the role of Iggy DeLacey on the Pemberley Digital and PBS Digital Studios collaborative series Frankenstein MD. The series is produced by Bernie Su who has won Emmy Awards for his previous webseries projects, The Lizzie Bennet Diaries and Emma Approved. Zaragoza's character is based on the Igor character. Due to his role on Frankenstein, MD, Zaragoza appeared at LeakyCon 2014, with co-actress Anna Lore. Frankenstein, MD is an online video adaptation of Mary Shelley's Frankenstein, and is shot at YouTube Space LA.

Zaragoza was the MC for the NMR! Live event.

Zaragoza also appeared in Oscar's Hotel for Fantastical Creatures portraying Manny, the mantis landscaper at the titular hotel.

In 2015, Zaragoza confirmed he would releasing an album titled Animals. It would feature songs written by various other web personalities, including Chelsea Dunaway, Owen Carter and Andy Kaufman's Ghost. In the same year, Zaragoza hosted a short-lived online revival of the classic game show Password for YouTube's Official channel Buzzr featuring various web personalities as contestant until 2016.

In 2016, he started to host Mostly Harmless for ComicConHQ, as well as launching three podcasts: Cloverfeels with comedian Mike Falzone; Dynamic Banter also with Mike Falzone; and It Feels Like the First Time with Owen Carter and Brett Register. All of these podcasts are a part of the HeadGum Network.

In 2017, Steve Zaragoza guest starred in the Bizaardvark episode "In Your Space" portraying Sore Loser Guy. In that same year, Zaragoza also guest starred in Parker Plays.

In 2017, Zaragoza released an Internet series called "Torty Cloud" the first episode being named "Welcome to Torty". The series features Steve Zaragoza and McKenzie Stith acting.

In 2018, Zaragoza co-founded The Valleyfolk, a YouTube channel and production company, with fellow SourceFed members Joe Bereta, Elliott Morgan (former host of the online revival of the classic game show Beat the Clock), and Lee Newton. In 2019, the Valleyfolk competed on the short-lived NBC reality comedy competition show Bring the Funny hosted by Amanda Seales, winning the show's first season.
