= Christopher John O'Neill =

Comedian and Broadway actor

- Occupations: Comedian, musical theater actor
- Years active: 2000–present
- Notable work: The Chris and Paul Show
- Spouse: Jennifer Viola Sessions (m. 2013)
- Parent(s): Rich and Karen O'Neill

Christopher John O'Neill is a comedian and Broadway actor, best known for playing the role of Elder Arnold Cunningham in the musical The Book of Mormon. While performing at the Edinburgh Festival Fringe with his two-man traveling comedy act, The Chris and Paul Show, O'Neill was spotted by a casting director and invited to audition for the role of Elder Cunningham. He joined the first national tour as Elder Cunningham in December 2012, his professional acting debut, and in January 2015 he joined the Broadway cast. In 2019, The Chris and Paul Show competed in the NBC comedy competition television series Bring the Funny, making it to the finals of the show's first season.

== Early life ==
Christopher John O'Neill grew up in Stamford, Connecticut, the son of Rich and Karen O'Neill. His father is a multi-instrumentalist and Juilliard School-educated pianist, and his mother is a middle school teacher. He also has one brother, Brian. While O'Neill took up music and performed in musicals and plays, he grew up wanting to be a soccer player. By his sophomore year at Stamford High School, Chris O’Neill had been kicked off the soccer team for his poor grades and felt he had nothing to look forward to. By the end of high school he wanted to be a professional comedian. O'Neill applied to several college theater programs, but owing to a lack of experience, was not accepted into any of them.

== The Chris and Paul Show ==
Starting in 2000, O'Neill and Paul Valenti began collaborating as a sketch-comedy duo called The Chris and Paul Show. O'Neill described the duo's style as "stupid and abrupt"; it also involved physical comedy. In 2003, shortly after O'Neill graduated high school, the pair moved to New York City, where O'Neill worked a series of retail and service jobs while Valenti found gigs for the duo to perform at. The Chris and Paul Show did receive some acclaim, with O'Neill receiving the Best Actor in a Comedy award from the New York Television Festival and the duo receiving Best Newcomer award at the 2011 Montreal Sketch Festival. They were also nominated for the same award at the 2011 Edinburgh Festival Fringe, which invited them to return in 2012.

In 2019, The Chris and Paul Show competed in the NBC comedy competition television series Bring the Funny, making it to the finals of the show's first season.

== The Book of Mormon ==
While performing at the Edinburgh Festival Fringe, O'Neill and Valenti were both spotted by a casting director for the musical The Book of Mormon. The two made it through several auditions in Los Angeles before O'Neill was invited to New York for a month-long training camp and extended audition. Over a dozen other people auditioned for the role of Elder Cunningham at the training camp, including Ben Platt and Cody Strand, who would be chosen to play the role in Chicago and on Broadway, respectively.

O'Neill was selected to play Elder Cunningham for the first national tour, replacing original cast member Jared Gertner, who left the national tour for the soon-to-open West End production. He made his debut on December 28, 2012. The performance was also the national tour debut of Mark Evans, who replaced Gavin Creel (who also left for West End) as Elder Price. The role was O'Neill's first in professional musical theater. On January 6, 2015, O'Neill joined the Broadway cast of The Book of Mormon, with Gavin Creel joining the Broadway Cast as Elder Price the same night.

== Personal life ==
O'Neill married his longtime girlfriend, Jennifer Viola Sessions, in April 2013. He has two daughters, Harper and Hailey.
