= The Chris and Paul Show =

American sketch comedy duo

The Chris and Paul Show is an American sketch comedy duo composed of Christopher John O'Neill and Paul Valenti. They are known for their vaudeville-inspired physical comedy, which consists of largely pantomimed scenes with minimal or no dialogue. The duo began performing 1999, and are based in New York City. They have toured across the United States and in Europe. They gained wide exposure in 2019 as contestants on the NBC comedy competition television series Bring the Funny, in which they placed as finalists.

== Early lives ==
Chris O'Neill is from Stamford, Connecticut. He graduated from Stamford High School, where he performed in school productions, and briefly attended Norwalk Community College before leaving college to pursue comedy full time. He performed at the Curtain Call community theater.

Paul Valenti attended Greenwich High School in Greenwich, Connecticut.

== Career ==
O'Neill and Valenti met in 1999 at the theater company Curtain Call in Stamford, where they both attended a class taught by community theater veteran Suzi Lynch, who was quickly impressed with the duo. She taught them comedy by masters such as Jack Benny, Sid Caesar, Carol Burnett, Tim Conway, Laurel and Hardy. She also imparted to them the principle that "To be funny, you don’t have to be dirty," teaching instead that "You just have to be silly. Don’t be afraid to be silly." O'Neill and Valenti refer to Lynch as their "Yoda" for the mentor role that she took on for them, providing feedback on their material and suggestions for improvement. The two men began performing together professionally in 2000.

In 2003 O'Neill and Valenti moved to New York City, renting an apartment on the Upper West Side. They headlined in multiple New York comedy clubs, including The People's Improv Theater (The PIT), Upright Citizen's Brigade, Carolines on Broadway, Comedy Cellar, Stand Up NY, Comic Strip, Comix, The Gotham Comedy Club and Joe's Pub.

In 2019, the duo gained wide exposure in 2019 as contestants on the NBC comedy competition television series Bring the Funny, in which they placed as finalists.

=== Comedy style ===
The Chris and Paul Show's sketches involve an emphasis on physical comedy and minimal or no dialogue, a style influenced by comedians like Laurel and Hardy, which the Stamford Advocate described as "modern day vaudeville with an edgy, unexpected twist." In one of their sketches, for example, O'Neill and Valenti act out getting into a car as cheerful music plays over what appears to be a pleasant ride. The skit takes a turn when it is revealed that the smiling and cheerful characters are actually on their way to commit a bank robbery, which then leads to a violent police chase. O'Neill said of his comedy, "We like to set it up where the audience likes to think where the sketch is going and then we turn the switch on them."

== Reception ==
The Washington Post's Jessica Goldstein, commenting on the duo's practice of setting up an idea, only for it to be subverted in the payoff, stated, "'The Chris and Paul Show' is their sensibility distilled to its simplest form: a joke heads in one direction but veers to the left at the last minute, and the sketch snaps shut before the shock fully registers.

Barrie Morgan, reviewing The Chris and Paul Show's performance at the 2011 Edinburgh Fringe Festival for The Skinny, lauded the act, saying that it offers "a unique show of interesting and surprising skits that are both intelligent and hilarious. The show starts slowly but the audience instantly warm to the two Americans. Their comedic dynamic is spot on, and it shows." Morgan called the duo "one of the greatest sketch shows I've ever seen."

Steve Bennett, reviewing the same entry at that festival for Chortle called O'Neill and Valenti "slick, talented and with undoubted funny", comparing them to The Pajama Men. Bennett noted the manner in which their skits gradually establish their premise in judiciously quiet moments, before implementing more manic payoffs that subvert expectations. While Bennett did not believe that the setups were always paced properly, he noted the ones that were, saying, "To call them sketches would seem to demean their unquestionable artistry – builds up the tension so beautifully, then punctures it so hilariously with just two short words, it's one of the best single moments of the Fringe."

Jon Stapley, reviewing a 2012 Edinburgh performance of The Chris and Paul Show for Broadway Baby, lauded the pair, noting that despite the audience tension on account of the performance beginning ten minutes late, "the result was a very different, very funny hour of comedy that quickly won the audience’s affections and left everyone with big grins on their faces." Stapley called The Chris and Paul Show's approach to sketch comedy "novel", praising their "impressive physical comedy chops", and the way in which they incorporate impromptu participation by audience members into their sketches. Although Stapley also criticized the duo for the length of their "long, awkward pauses," and with their ability to end a scene, "the physical talent and originality on display...more than made up for it. Chris and Paul put on a relentlessly unique sketch show and did it very well indeed. A highly entertaining and highly recommended hour of comedy."

=== Awards ===
- 2011 Best Newcomer Nominee – Edinburgh Fringe Festival
- 2011 Best Actor in a Comedy (O'Neill and Valenti tied) - New York Television Festival

== Personal lives ==
Both O'Neill and Valenti live in Stamford Connecticut as of July 2019.

O'Neill married his longtime girlfriend, Jennifer, in April 2013. He has two daughters, Harper and Hailey.
