= David Zed =

American mime, actor and singer

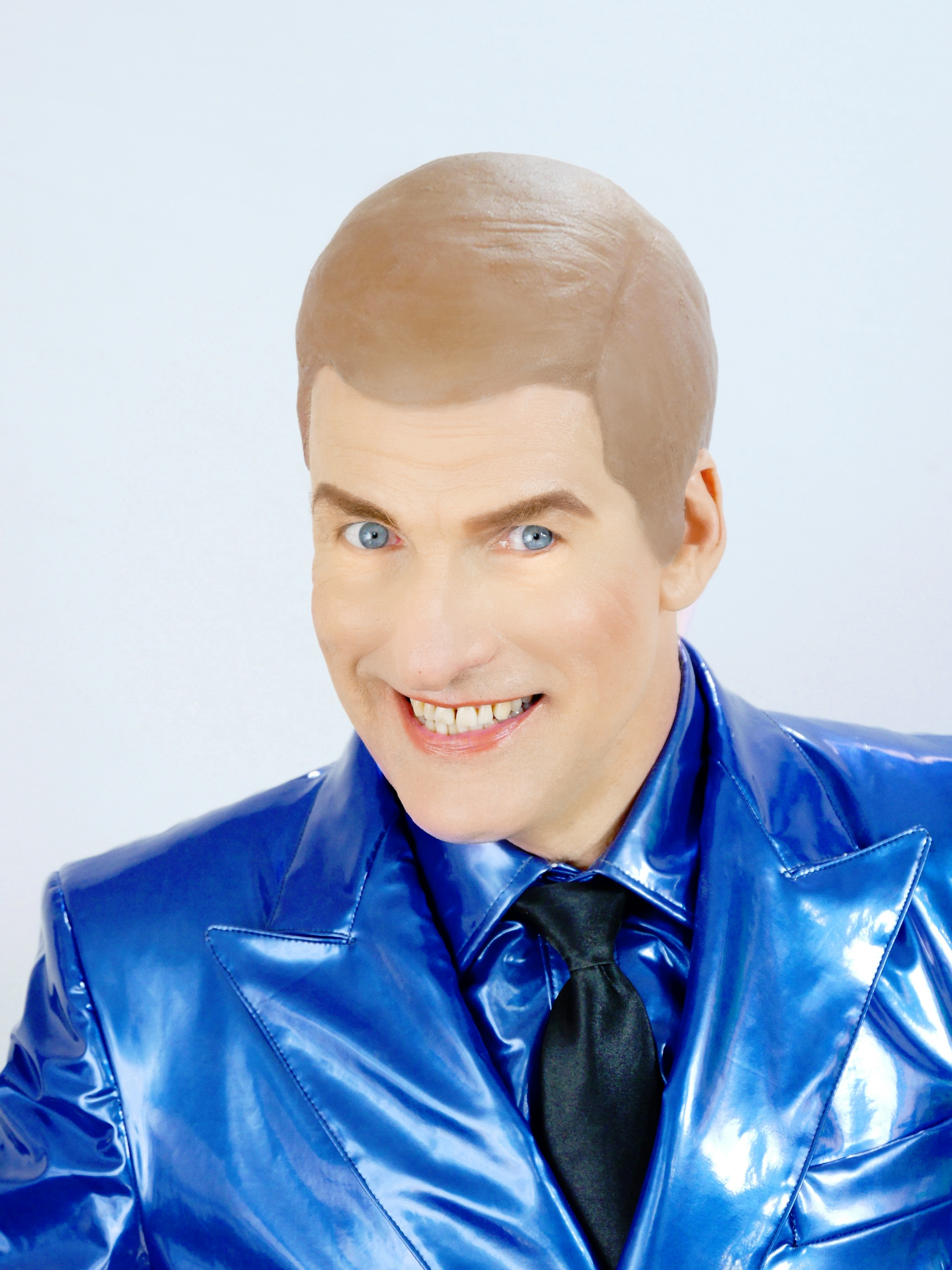
- Traylor as Mr. Zed
- Born: David Kirk Traylor; October 28, 1956 (age 69); Indianapolis, Indiana, U.S.
- Other name: Mr. Zed
- Occupations: Mime, actor, singer, comedian
- Website: www.mrzed.com

David Kirk Traylor, best known by his stage names David Zed and Mr. Zed, is an American mime, actor and singer, and comedian mainly active in Italy and the United States. His mime work involves portraying "Mr. Zed", a fictional human-like robot.

== Career ==
Born in Indianapolis, David Traylor found success in the late 1970s performing "Zed", a humanoid robot. His performance of Mr. Zed included mime work, such as shuffling his feet, moving his forearms rhythmically, and mechanically rotating his head. In 1980, he was a guest at the Sanremo Music Festival with the song "R.O.B.O.T.", which became his biggest hit as a singer. In the mid-1990s, he was the author and host of the television show Mr. Zed Show, which was broadcast throughout the Middle East, North Africa and Northern Europe through the Orbit Satellite television network. The Mister Zed Show was the first program of its kind to be shot entirely on digital video. The series featured a revised version of his Mister Zed character as a comedic figure, portrayed as the first-ever robotic stand-up comedian; in this context, he made numerous appearances on US and Canadian television programs and comedy festivals.

He has also starred in a number of films and television series. As "Mister Zed", he competed in 2019 in the American reality television comedy competition series Bring the Funny, making it to the first round (the "Open Mic"). He returned as a special guest in the season finale and appeared on the Tonight Show with Jimmy Fallon to promote the show.

Besides his work on comedy, Traylor also worked as a voice actor for animated films and video games, most notably Day of the Tentacle.

== Discography ==
=== Singles ===
- 1980 – "I'm a Robot/I'm a Robot (Instrumental Version)" (Banana Records, 7")
- 1980 – "R.O.B.O.T. (erreobioti)/R.O.B.O.T. (Versione Strumentale)" (EMI, 7")
- 1980 – "Balla robot/Balla Robot (Versione Strumentale)" (Banana Records, 7")
- 1983 – "Ballarobot/I am a Robot" (Banana Records, 7")
- 1986 – "Witch Doctor/U-I-U-A-A" (G & G Records, 7", 12")
