= The Valleyfolk =

American comedy group

- Day version of the logo

YouTube information
- Channel: The Valleyfolk
- Years active: 2018-present
- Genre: Comedy
- Subscribers: 210 thousand
- Views: 31.4 million
- Last updated: August 4, 2026

The Valleyfolk is a YouTube-based comedy group originating in Los Angeles, California. The group was founded by former SourceFed hosts Joe Bereta, Elliott Morgan, Lee Newton, and Steve Zaragoza. The channel launched in January 2018 and gained over 93,000 subscribers within the first 24 hours.

The group gained national attention in 2019 by appearing on the NBC comedy competition show Bring the Funny, beating out thirty-nine other comedy acts and winning the show's inaugural season.

As of September 23, 2019, the group currently consists of Bereta, Morgan, and Zaragoza with founding member Newton being ousted from the group in a unanimous decision by the other members.

== History ==
=== Founding ===
The four hosts first worked together at SourceFed, beginning as the original hosts of the channel in 2012. The channel was created in conjunction with YouTube personality Philip DeFranco and YouTube itself. While Joe and Elliott left the channel in 2014, Lee left in 2015, and Steve reduced his role to part-time; the channel continued making news commentary and other comedic videos until its demise in March 2017. Less than one year later, the group of four reunited independently and on January 8, 2018, The Valleyfolk was born. Due to the previous success of the four, both individually and together, the group gained more than 93,000 subscribers within the first 24 hours and more than 4,000 patrons within the first 48.

The Valleyfolk logos, one featuring mountains at day and one featuring them at night, were created by David Morgan, graphic artist and brother of Elliott Morgan.

=== Bring the Funny ===
On July 9, 2018, the group announced that they were participating in NBC's comedy competition show Bring the Funny, appearing as part of the Sketch Act Division. The competition consists of four rounds and the prize is $250,000 and the opportunity to perform at the Just for Laughs comedy festival.

In the first round, or the Open Mic round, the Valleyfolk began their run with a sketch in which they played "mole people". The sketch elicited praise from Kenan Thompson for the commitment the quartet showed to the bit. In the Comedy Clash round, the group went head to head with competing comedian Drennon Davis. Their sketch involved an inappropriately gleeful robot doctor informing a woman of her husband's demise. In the semifinals, the group performed a sketch that parodied a superhero academy that involved a flurry of feathers being dumped on the audience. The group made it to the final round of the competition by being selected as the viewer-voted wildcard team. On September 17, 2019, they won the show's first season by receiving the most votes from the viewing public. In addition to the prize money and Just for Laughs invite, the group's national television exposure has resulted in an estimated 10,000 new YouTube subscribers by the day after the show's finale.

=== Other work ===
On October 11, 2018, h3h3Productions made a video roasting Valleyfolk member Elliott Morgan's previous work on a pilot of a TLC Network show titled I Catfished My Kid. In response, The Valleyfolk published their own video in response, garnering more than 200,000 views in two days.

On July 7, 2019, the Valleyfolk appeared as guests at the inaugural RTX Podcast Festival in Austin, Texas. Their podcast, The Valleycast, was one of six guest podcasts taped live at the annual RTX event hosted by Rooster Teeth.

=== Newton's departure ===
On November 1, 2019, a video titled 'Lee Announcement | The Valleyfolk (Update)' was posted on the main channel. In it, the group explained the absence of Newton from the past month of content as well as explained the future of the channel. Fifteen minutes later, Newton posted her own video from her channel explaining that her last official date with the group was September 23, 2019 and that it was not her decision to leave the team. In the week following the announcement, the Valleyfolk channel lost 20,000 subscribers and over 700 patrons, prompting a follow-up video from the trio apologizing for their handling of the announcement.

== Recurring segments ==
- Your Show - a variety show that often involves sketches, games, and viewer questions.
- Your World Today - a satirical news and current events show.
- The Valleycast - a weekly behind the scenes video podcast.
- Games
  - Trivia Bidet
  - Movie Movie Game
