= Morgan Jay =

American comedian and actor (born 1987)

- Born: Morgan Venticinque; February 2, 1987 (age 39); Teaneck, New Jersey, U.S.

Comedy career
- Years active: 2007–present
- Medium: Stand-up; television; film
- Genres: Observational comedy; Improvisational comedy; sketch comedy; satire
- Subjects: American culture; pop culture; sex; Dating; current events
- Musical career
- Instruments: Vocals, guitar, Pitch correction
- Website: Official website

Morgan Jay Venticinque (born February 2, 1987) is an American comedian, musician, actor, and YouTuber. Jay rose to fame by packaging his work in music and comedy into short-form content on TikTok and Instagram. His music often combines Auto-Tune pitch correction, guitar, and vocals. His focus on social media has driven 5.4 million followers to his Instagram and 10 million followers to his TikTok.

== Early life and education ==
Jay was born in Teaneck, New Jersey, United States, and grew up in Mahwah, New Jersey. His parents were Gaetano (Cayetano) Venticinque (d. 1993) and Sylvia Oliveira. He is of Brazilian and Italian descent.

Jay's father, Cayetano Venticinque, was a Sicilian singer who performed under the stage name Ricardo Roda. Venticinque moved with his family to Buenos Aires, Argentina, in 1948, later leaving Argentina during the 1970s. He died of cancer in Italy in 1993, when Morgan was six years old.

Jay was a "class clown" in high school and began his career with traditional stand-up comedy. He studied at NYU Tisch School of the Arts and received training from the Stella Adler Studio of Acting and the Upright Citizens Brigade in New York City.

== Career ==
Jay began performing comedy at open mics in 2007 in New York City while in college, and developed his stage presence through experiences such as interning on The Tonight Show Starring Jimmy Fallon and working as a certified New York City bike tour guide. His background includes acting and choir. After six years of performing, he incorporated music into his comedy act.

He cites Rory Scovel, Reggie Watts and Karen Kilgariff as several of his influences. In other interviews, he's cited comedians Stephen Lynch and Adam Sandler.

In 2019, he appeared on NBC's Bring the Funny, but this did not significantly advance his career. During the COVID-19 pandemic, Jay started posting clips of his crowd work from previous shows on social media, particularly TikTok. His online following then grew rapidly. This social media success led to a largely sold-out comedy tour across the U.S.

He rose to prominence through viral TikTok videos featuring audience participation segments, using an auto-tuned microphone that allows audience members to sing with him. He speaks to audiences by singing about relationships and everyday topics, and encourages audience members to respond in song with auto-tune vocals. His comedic songs explore subjects such as relationship dynamics ("What Are We"), moving in together ("Home Intruder"), and suppressed desires ("Bro"). His TikTok video "Just Friends?" became viral with over 129 million views and contributed to Jay's popularity.

His 2023 special, Live at the Village, was filmed in a Los Angeles recording studio. He credits director Jocelyn Cooper and cinematographer Sophie Bruza for the production's visual quality. After streaming services passed on the special, Jay released it on YouTube, where it received positive feedback. It has, however, since been released on Hulu.

As of April 2025, Jay was on a U.S. and international tour, including sold-out shows at venues like the Wiltern in Los Angeles. His following is largely made up of Gen Z fans, many of whom cite his performances as their first comedy show. Jay refers to his fan base as the "goofy gang".

Jay is managed by Matt Sadeghian of Brillstein Entertainment Partners and Josh Sandler of Granderson Des Rochers. He is recognized by Billboard as one of the top 15 musical comedians as of June 2025.

=== Television and film ===
Morgan Jay has appeared in TV sitcoms such as St. Denis Medical and acted in the film Cotton Candy Bubble Gum which premiered at South by Southwest. He has also been on MTV's Wild’n’Out, Girls5eva, Bring the Funny, and Night Court. He portrays Leigh Pruden in the 2026 Disney+ television series Wonder Man.
