= SourceFed =

Former YouTube channel and news website

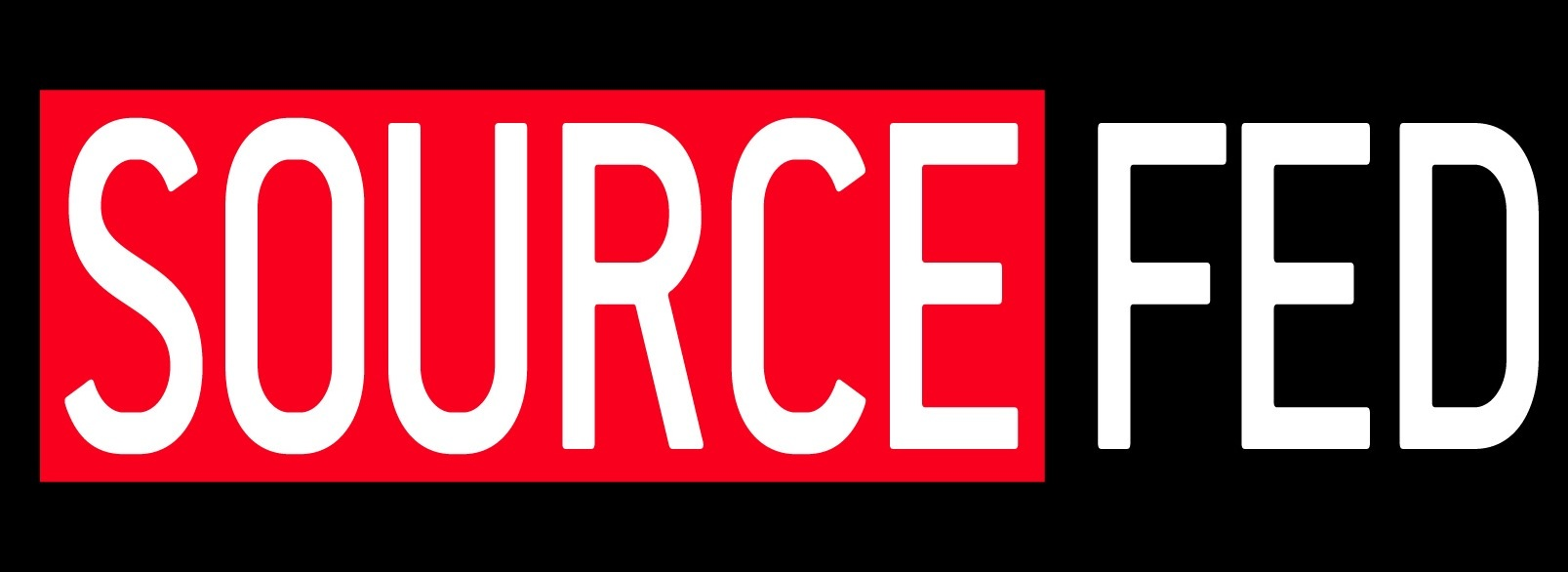

YouTube information
- Channel: SourceFed
- Years active: 2012–2017
- Genres: News; entertainment
- Subscribers: 1.53 million
- Views: 964.6 million
- Last updated: June 5, 2026

SourceFed was a YouTube channel web series and news website created by Philip DeFranco in January 2012 as part of YouTube's original channel initiative, and was originally produced by James Haffner.

The main SourceFed channel mainly focused on popular culture, news, and technology. SourceFed was a part of DeFranco's portfolio of Internet-based media properties, including his own eponymous news YouTube series. That portfolio was named DeFranco Creative and later renamed SourceFed Studios when acquired by Discovery Communications' Revision3.

On March 20, 2017, the cancellation of SourceFed, along with its still-active sister channels, was announced. The closure of the SourceFed Studios network was decided by the newly formed Group Nine Media, led by Discovery Communications, which was formed as a merger between SourceFed Studios and four other networks in October 2016. The final SourceFed video was a farewell livestream broadcast on March 24, 2017. Around the time of the closure of SourceFed Studios, the SourceFed channel had accumulated over 1.7 million subscriptions and 900 million video views.

== History ==
=== Under DeFranco's ownership (2011–2013) ===
==== Development and launch ====
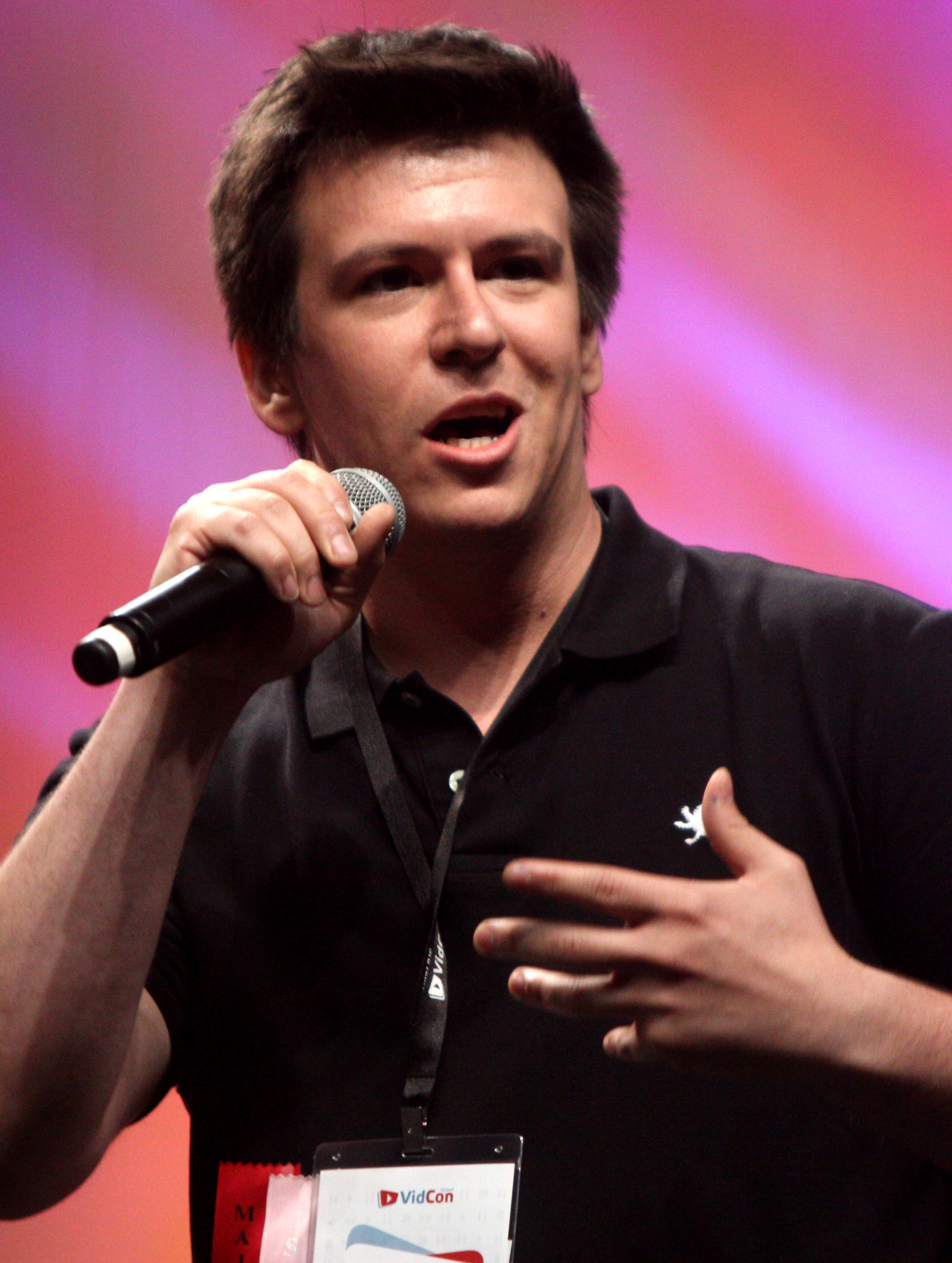
Philip DeFranco, the creator of SourceFed

SourceFed was an idea Philip DeFranco had been considering as an evolution of his own YouTube series, The Philip DeFranco Show (PDS). In an interview with Forbes, DeFranco stated that he originally wanted to turn his daily show into several daily segments. He added that there was confusion among his audience when this format was tested, convincing DeFranco that he would need to create a new series to not alienate, but grow his audience.

The SourceFed YouTube channel was created in April 2011. In late 2011, YouTube announced its $100 million funding of original or premium content channels, with DeFranco's SourceFed being included among those announced. Due to DeFranco's position as a YouTube partner, the website offered him funding for an original channel. The SourceFed channel, based on a blog of the same name, was one of these channels. DeFranco revealed that he acquired the funding to launch the channel by originally promising YouTube that the channel would be run as a "celebrity gossip channel", and that it would consist of a single show rather than multiple different shows. However, DeFranco negotiated for less funding, in return to have creative control over the channel's content. The funding was provided by YouTube, as the channel was part of YouTube's original content initiative. DeFranco hand-picked the first six hosts of SourceFed: Joe Bereta, Elliott Morgan, Lee Newton, Steve Zaragoza, Trisha Hershberger, and Meg Turney. Additionally, SourceFed was originally produced by James Haffner.

The channel launched as an original channel on January 23, 2012. In 2012, Reuters reported that DeFranco had plans to create a news network. Along with the staple news show (20 Minutes or Less), five additional shows began airing within the first month of the channel's January 2012 launch: Curb Cash, One On One, DeFranco Inc.: Behind the Scenes, Comment Commentary and Bloopers. Curb Cash ended in March 2012. The New Movie Thing Show, a movie review series, and a movie club-style series titled The SourceFed Movie Club were launched in May 2012. Since then, SourceFed has debuted new additions to the channel's lineup. As additional content was being introduced, the SourceFed crew expanded, adding hosts and editors to its team.

==== Launch year events ====
In early 2012, the Maxim Hot 100 voting website crashed on multiple occasions. Bereta and Morgan claimed that these crashes coincided with them telling their audience through 20 Minutes or Less to vote for Newton as a write-in candidate. Maxim did not address their claims, but did come out with an article noting that Newton had "list potential". In May, it was announced that Lee Newton placed 57th on the 2012 Maxim Hot 100 list.

In March 2012, Philip DeFranco announced that he would take the SourceFed crew to VidCon 2012. There, Bereta, Morgan, Newton, and Zaragoza, along with DeFranco, held a Q&A panel and performed.

SourceFed hosts Meg Turney and Elliott Morgan, along with Philip DeFranco, presented a series of videos as part of YouTube's "Election Hub" during the 2012 Democratic National Convention and the 2012 Republican National Convention, and joined journalists during live coverage streamed at the end of each night of the conventions. A public relations representative for YouTube stated “Having awesome partners like Philip DeFranco involved will attract younger viewers and he will have a really fresh take on politics". YouTube's "Election Hub" channels for major news networks only received several hundred views, whilst DeFranco's videos on Election Hub received tens of thousands. It was put down to it being in an 'experimental stage'. Most of the partners of Election Hub, excluding DeFranco, Al Jazeera English and BuzzFeed, struggled to garner 1,000 views of their on-demand content during the RNC. During the videos, Turney predicted that the DNC will not make a difference for young voters. During the conventions, SourceFed uploaded videos explaining them. #PDSLive 2012 Election Night Coverage, a five-hour live event hosted by SourceFed and DeFranco, was nominated for a Streamy Award for Best Live Event.

Philip DeFranco later created a spinoff channel, SourceFedNerd (stylized as SourceFedNERD), which was announced on May 16, 2013.

=== Under Discovery and Revision3 (2013–16) ===
In June 2013, Philip DeFranco sold SourceFed along with the other channels under his DeFranco Creative portfolio to Revision3. DeFranco also became an executive of Revision3 and the Senior Vice President of Philip DeFranco Networks and Merchandise as a result of the move. In June 2016, DeFranco made his earliest public clarification that he has "no hands on the creative decisions [made] on [SourceFed]," and while discussing the cancellation of SourceFed in 2017, DeFranco detailed that after selling his DeFranco Creative umbrella to Revision3, he began to have less involvement on the channel, before having no involvement at all.

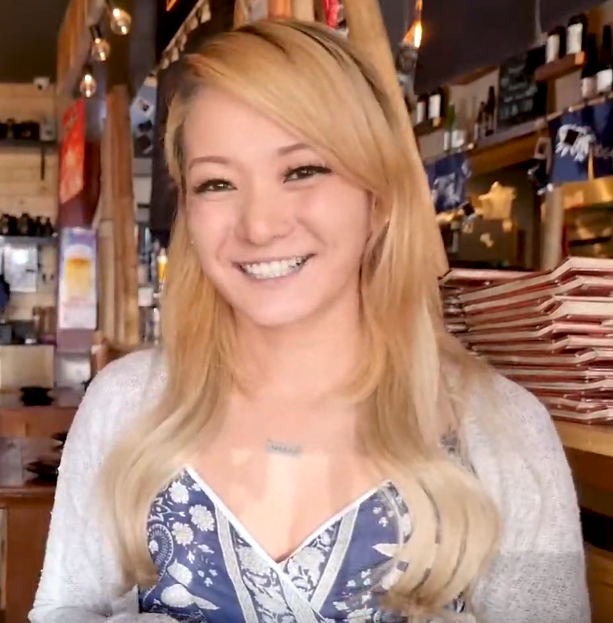
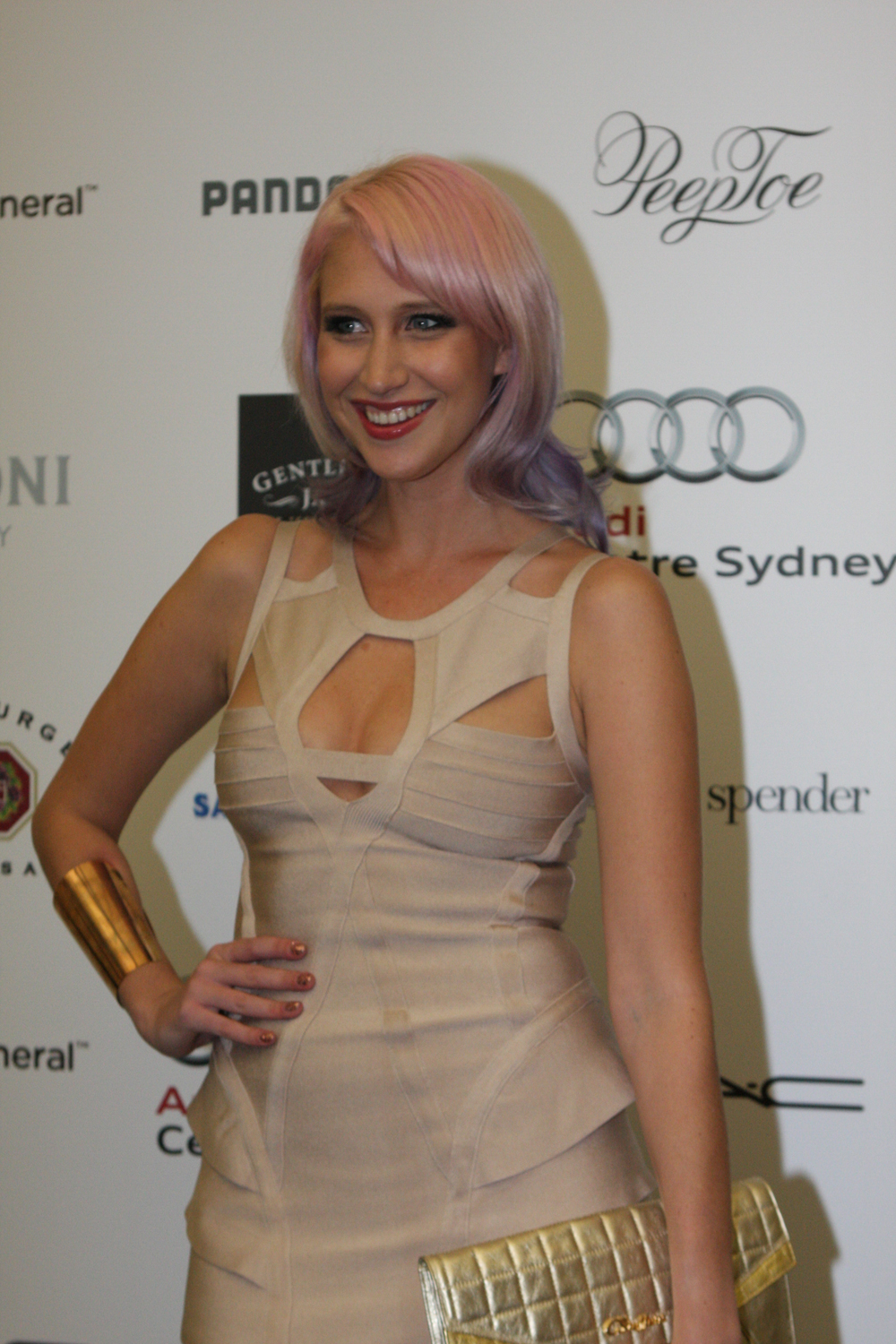
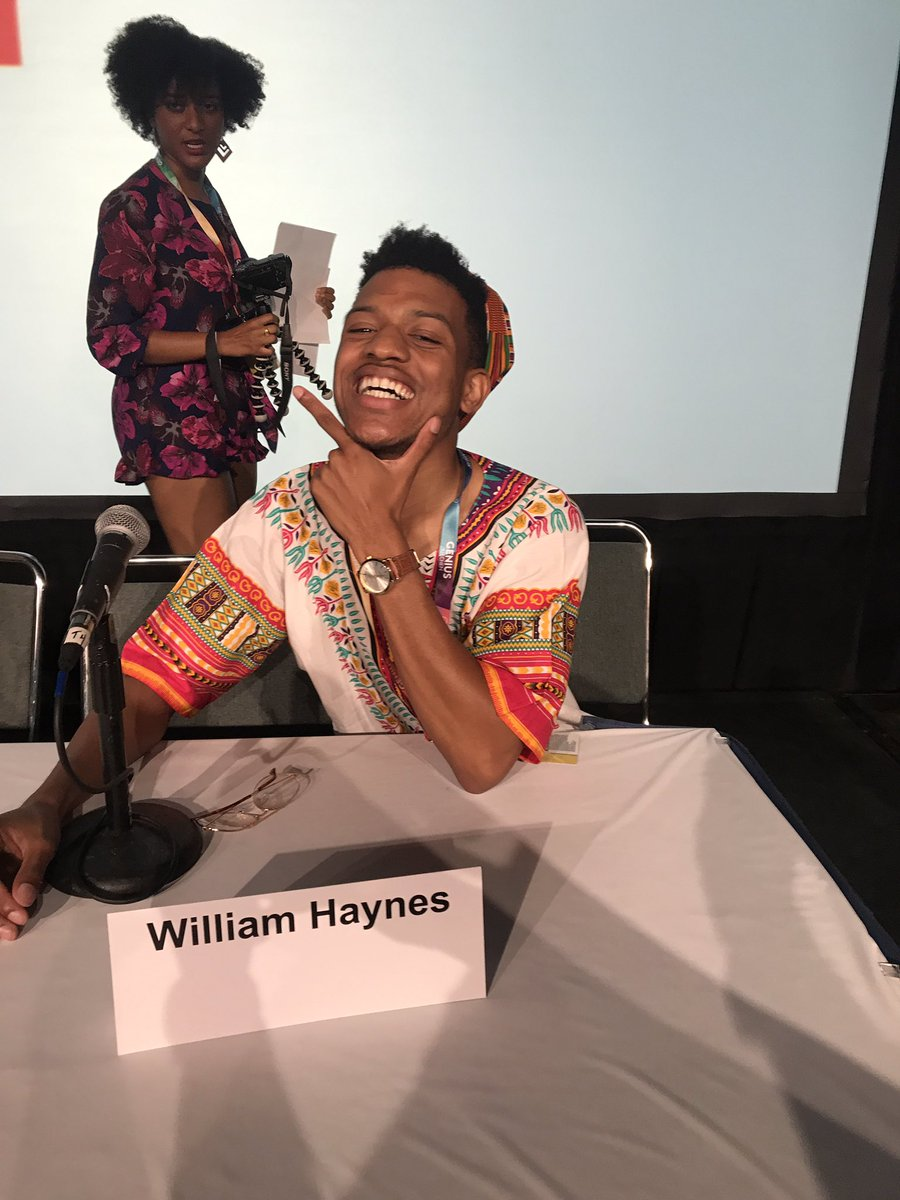
L–R: Reina Scully, Maude Garrett, and William Haynes were brought on during Revision3's ownership.

During 2013, SourceFed was announced to be a sponsor of that year's VidCon, as well as special guests of the event. The event would be held in August. During the event, the couch featured on Comment Commentary was "eaten" by Sharkzilla, the mascot of Shark Week. DeFranco previously hosted Discovery Channel's Shark Week event. While at VidCon 2013, DeFranco gathered 554 people to play Ninja, a playground game, claiming the amount would be a world record. SourceFed also made appearances at VidCon in 2014, 2015 and 2016.

In April 2014, it was announced that Elliott Morgan and Meg Turney would both be leaving SourceFed by the end of the month. They were the first hosts to ever leave SourceFed, something which would occur frequently after their precedent. Morgan and Turney, like the hosts which would leave after them, appeared in other online media promptly after their departures; Morgan would work with Mashable, while Turney would become part of Rooster Teeth's personnel.

In September 2014, Zaragoza and Newton hosted a news story covering various charities' refusal of donations from Reddit, following the then-recent celebrity nude photo leaks. The video received criticism from the SourceFed fanbase, and according to StatSheep, the channel lost over 20,000 subscribers. DeFranco took to Reddit, stating that the significant drop in subscribers was either due to "an error of that individual stats website or YouTube removing dead accounts." Additionally, in response to requests or demands in favor of removing or firing any hosts, DeFranco stated, "No. I let SourceFed control their own creative." The video has slightly more dislikes than likes.

On February 27, 2015, SourceFed hosted a live event from YouTube Space LA. The show contained live versions of the weekly recurring shows and spoof bits done by the hosts.

==== 2016 Google−Hillary Clinton video ====
On June 9, 2016, SourceFed uploaded a video titled Did Google Manipulate Search for Hillary?, discussing whether or not Google manipulated search results to display Hillary Clinton in an untruthful positive light. This video was uploaded at the tailend of the primaries for the 2016 United States presidential election, with Clinton being the Democratic Party's presumptive nominee for President of the United States in the 2016 election. Matt Lieberman, the host for the video, suggested that Google's autofill feature pulls up results for Clinton's crime reform, despite "hillary clinton crime" being a more popular search term than "Hillary Clinton crime reform". Lieberman did emphasize that SourceFed was not accusing Google of any crimes, instead calling the manipulation "deeply unethical and wrong but not illegal." Lieberman also added that there is no evidence to suggest collusion between the Clinton campaign and Google, but went on to claim that "the intention is clear: Google is burying potential searches for terms that could have hurt Hillary Clinton in the primary elections over the past several months."

The video attracted considerably more media attention than other SourceFed uploads, as it was referred to in posts by USA Today, The Washington Times, Business Insider, and The Globe and Mail, among other outlets. Shane Dingman, writing for The Globe and Mail opined that "This conspiracy theory post is not typical fare" for SourceFed. Nick Corasaniti of the New York Times wrote that the "conspiracy theory [about Google suppressing negative news in search results about Hillary Clinton] began with a video from the online outlet SourceFed that went viral this year, and quickly garnered headlines on conservative news sites like Breitbart and InfoWars." Business Insider replicated the experiment shown in the video and found similar results. The video also drew responses from Google and Donald Trump (the Republican Party's then-presumptive nominee for President of United States). Google defended its search engine; one representative of the company stated "Google Autocomplete does not favor any candidate or cause. Claims to the contrary simply misunderstand how Autocomplete works." A Snopes fact check on the video rated its claims as "false". Trump stated that if SourceFed's claims were true, "it is a disgrace that Google would do that."

SourceFed uploaded a follow-up video, featuring Lieberman responding to the reception that the video received.

=== Group Nine Media merger and cancellation (2016–17) ===
In late 2016, the newly formed media company Group Nine Media acquired SourceFed Studios's parent company Revision3 (which was renamed as Seeker) from Discovery Digital Networks. Seeker and SourceFed Studios were merged along with Thrillist, NowThis News, and The Dodo into Group Nine, which then decided to close the SourceFed Studios network.

On March 20, 2017, the four hosts of SourceFed's primary channel at the time—Ava Gordy, Mike Falzone, Candace Carrizales, and Steven Suptic—released a video addressing the cancellation of SourceFed as well as its SourceFedNerd and People Be Like spinoffs. They also announced the schedule for the channel's final week; a podcast, a Comment Commentary episode, a usual white wall-styled video, and a live-streamed farewell video were announced for Tuesday, Wednesday, Thursday, and Friday, respectively. At the time, the SourceFed channel had amassed just over 1.7 million subscribers and 906 million video views in its run. DeFranco clarified on Twitter that he had no involvement with the decision to dissolve SourceFed Studios.

The final Nerd and People Be Like videos were released on March 24, 2017. SourceFed's final video was also uploaded, which doubled as the intro for the channel's 6 hour final live stream.

== Hosting ==
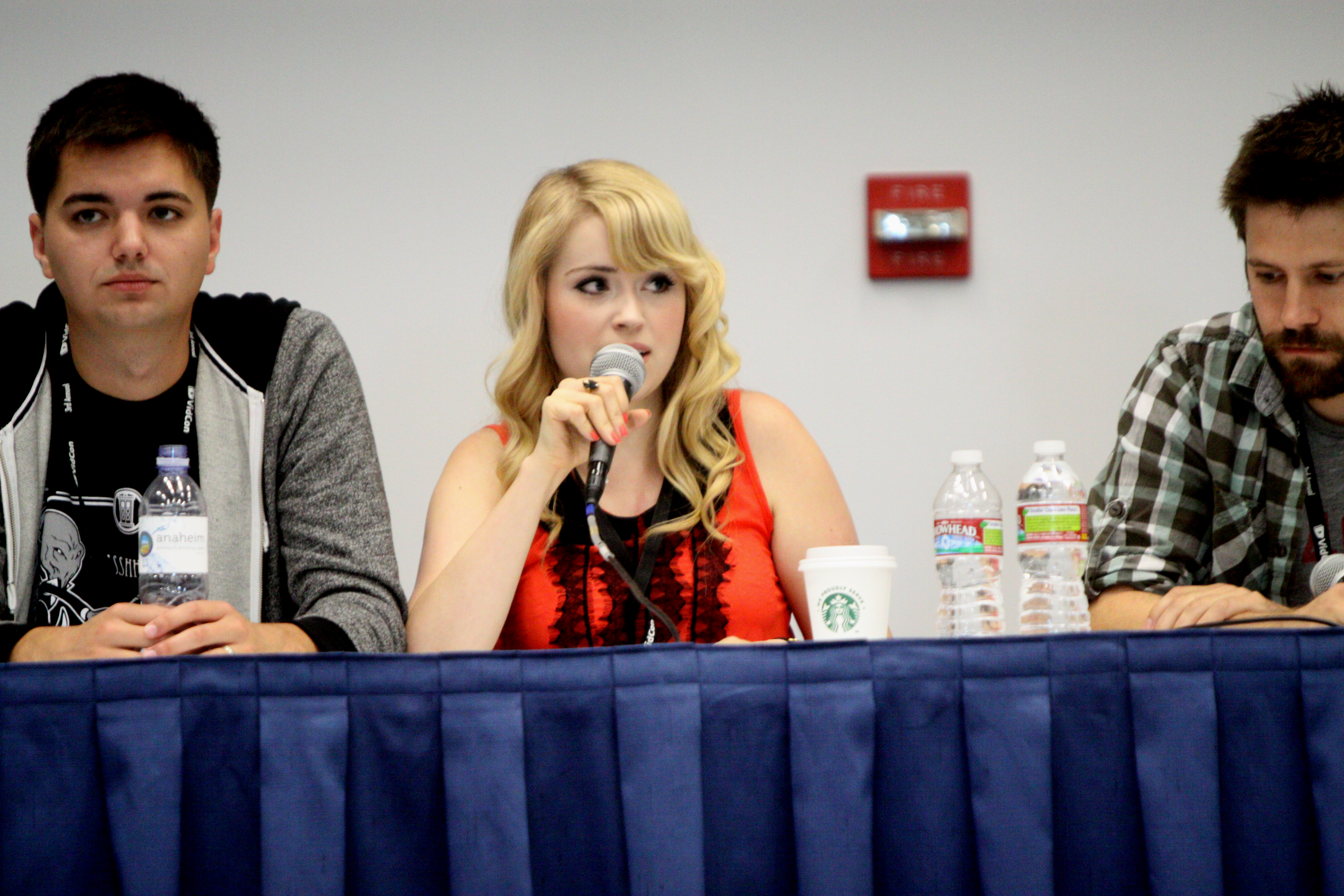
From left to right: Morgan, Newton, and Bereta, the original three hosts of SourceFed

When the channel launched in 2012, YouTube content creator Joe Bereta of Barats and Bereta, actor Elliott Morgan, and comedian Lee Newton, were introduced as the original three hosts of SourceFed. DeFranco, who hand-selected the three, also appeared as a host for the channel's first two weeks. DeFranco also hand-selected a second batch of three hosts (Trisha Hershberger, Meg Turney, and Steve Zaragoza) who debuted on the channel in 2012. All but Zaragoza would eventually leave the channel throughout 2014 and 2015. However, these hosts later made guest appearances on the channel after their departures, and Morgan specifically was briefly brought back on the main channel to host The Study.

Ross Everett was introduced as the seventh on-camera host, after spending time as a writer for the series. In April 2014, DeFranco announced Everett was moved back to his writing position. However, near the end of the month, Everett announced his departure from SourceFed in a Tumblr blog post. Amidst the 2014 departures of Everett, Morgan, and Turney, SourceFed brought on William Haynes, Matt Lieberman, and Reina Scully in March 2014, serving as the de facto replacements for the former. While Haynes and Lieberman stayed on with SourceFed through its cancellation, Scully left the company in August 2016.

With Bereta, Hershberger, and Newton's departures in late 2014 and early 2015, new hosts were brought on. On February 24, 2015, Sam Bashor accepted an offer to become an official host on the SourceFed and SourceFedNerd channels. He was previously a writer for the channels and made several appearances in videos. He was also the host for DeFranco's merchandising branch, ForHumanPeoples. Early 2015 would also see YouTube personality Bree Essrig, as well as Australian television and radio host Maude Garrett join in hosting SourceFed.

Early 2016 saw Mike Falzone join the main channel as the host of a revised form of #TableTalk, which was brought back to SourceFed's main channel content output. Scully and Garrett both announced their departures from SourceFed in August. Coinciding with their departures, Ava Gordy and Candace Carrizales were introduced as hosts on the main SourceFed channel.

Host timeline

Guest hosts

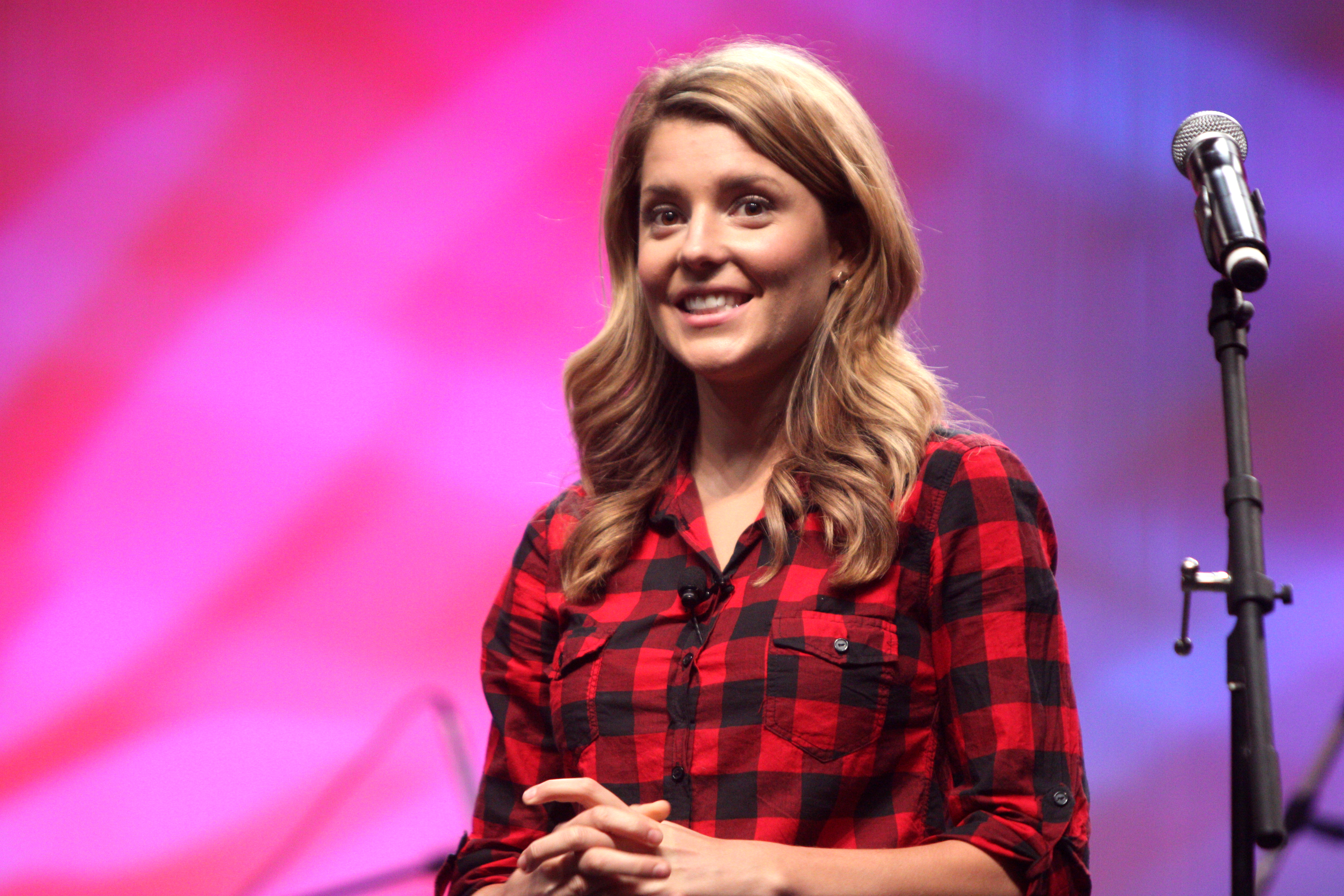
Grace Helbig has been a guest host on 2 SourceFed News episodes

- Keith Jordan (February 14, 2012)
- Harley Morenstein (March 5, 2012 and April 4, 2013)
- George Watsky (April 7 and August 12, 2014)
- The Gregory Brothers (Michael, Andrew, Evan and Sarah Gregory) (June 26, 2012)
- Sean Klitzner (October 10, 2012)
- Timothy Ferriss (November 19, 2012)
- Grace Helbig (June 10, 2013; 2 episodes)
- Laci Green (July 25, 2013)
- Rhett and Link (Rhett McLaughlin and Link Neal) (September 5, 2013)
- Megan Batoon (March 10 and July 29, 2015)

== Content ==
=== SourceFed News ===
The main series on the SourceFed channel was SourceFed News. The series featured 1–2 hosts presenting news stories, and covering a variety of topics. Episodes of the series were presented in a comedic daily newscast format. During his tenure on the series, Bereta was its head writer.

Early in its run, SourceFed's news series was titled 20 Minutes or Less, as five news stories would be covered daily throughout separate videos totaling 20 minutes or less. Due to only presenting five stories a day, stories covered on SourceFed often "cross-pollinated", or were influenced by news stories on the PDS. SourceFed News stories were also referred to as "white wall" videos. George Watsky's music was commonly used throughout the series in the background.

=== Notable additional programming ===
In addition to daily news coverage, the SourceFed channel produced and uploaded several shows.

Title	Premiere date	Finale date	Description	Ref(s)	Playlist
Comment Commentary	January 27, 2012	March 22, 2017 (Note: Originally ran from January 27, 2012 through February 27, 2015. The series returned on December 17, 2016 and ended on March 22, 2017.)	Comment Commentary was the second-longest running series on the SourceFed channel, behind only the main SourceFed News. The series featured the hosts voicing their commentary on the viewers' comments that were posted on the main SourceFed News videos.		
One on One	January 29, 2012	February 11, 2013	One on One was an interview-style show, where a member of SourceFed interviews an individual.		
The New Movie Thing Show	May 11, 2012	January 23, 2015 (Note: Ended on the Nerd channel after premiering on the SourceFed channel.)	The New Movie Thing Show was a film review series that was originally hosted by Philip DeFranco and Steve Zaragoza; the series later alternated hosts.		
#TableTalk	February 19, 2013	March 19, 2017 (Note: From May 2013 to May 2016, #TableTalk was uploaded onto the Nerd spinoff channel.)	A series that featured three of the SourceFed hosts—and occasionally DeFranco or guests from other industries—speaking about topics and questions that viewers suggested through Twitter, Reddit, or the comment section of previous episodes.		
People Be Like	August 31, 2014 (Note: The series began on the SourceFed channel and was moved onto its own channel in August 2015, with episodes beginning to air on the channel in September.)	March 24, 2017	People Be Like was hosted by William Haynes, who shared his thoughts on the world, while mainly focusing on Internet culture, trends, and occurrences.		
The Study ft. Elliott C. Morgan	August 22, 2015	April 23, 2016	The Study was a satirical political news show hosted by Elliott Morgan.		

== Reception ==
=== Audience and viewership ===
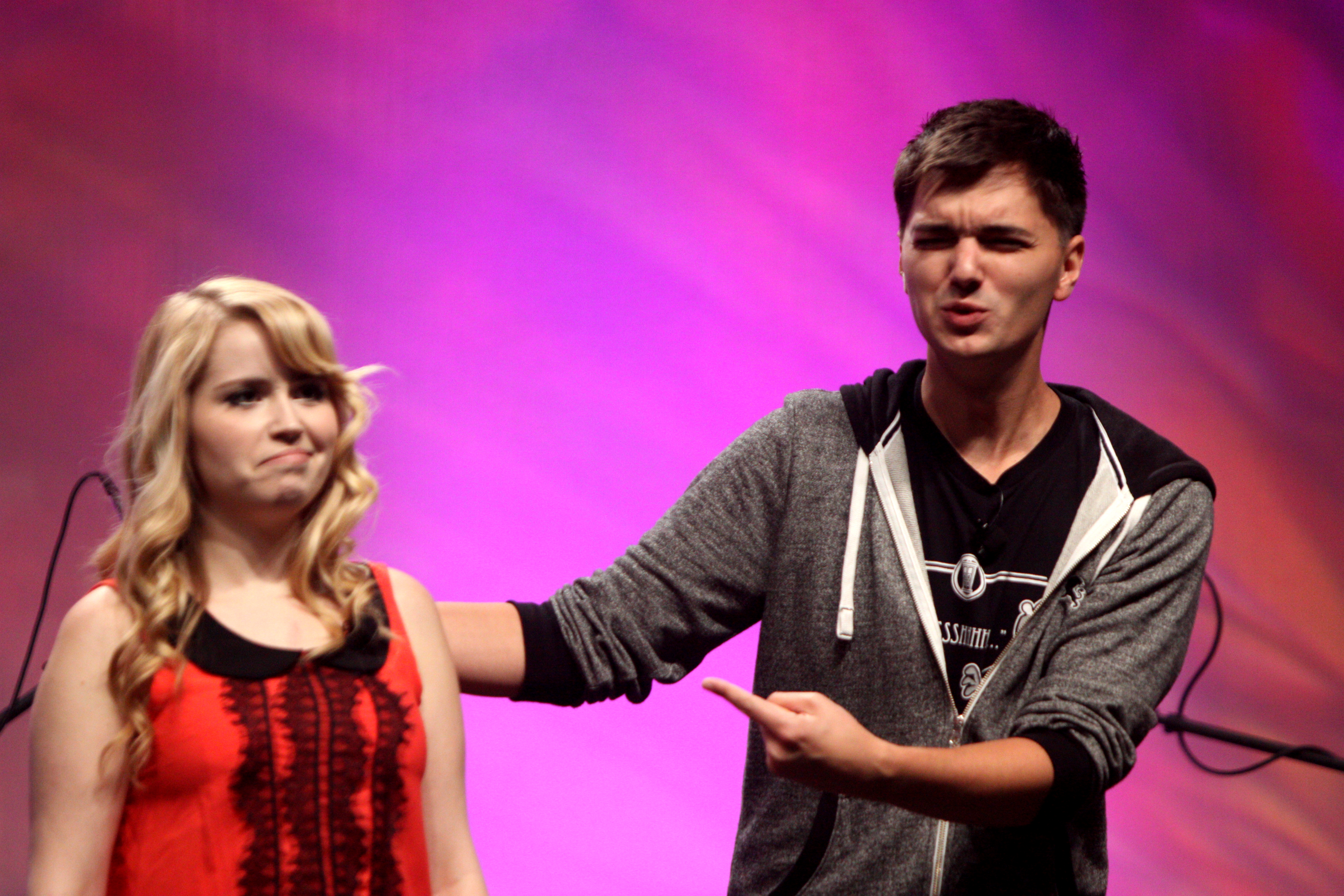
Lee Newton and Elliott Morgan at VidCon 2012

From May to December 2012, Deadline Hollywood tracked the weekly views of all the original premium channels on YouTube. The channel was consistently one of the top original channels every week. In May 2012, the SourceFed YouTube channel reached the 100 million video view milestone. It was the first of YouTube's original channel initiative to reach the milestone. On August 1, 2012, SourceFed became the first of the YouTube original channels to reach 500,000 subscribers. In celebration of the event, SourceFed uploaded a special 20 Minutes or Less video that featured clips of SourceFed's audience congratulating them and stating the reason that they subscribed to the channel.

SourceFed was one of the most popular YouTube original channels, as the channel earned over 20 million monthly views. Due to its success, SourceFed was among the 30-40% of original channels to be renewed by YouTube in November 2012. On July 14, 2013, the SourceFed channel reached one million subscribers.

=== Critical reception ===
The Wall Street Journal noted that it was hard to figure out why the simplicity of the idea behind SourceFed was able to receive mass appeal.

After winning the Streamy Audience Choice Award for Series of the Year, SourceFed's The New Movie Thing Show was criticized by The Atlantic. The publication wrote "The audience pick for series of the year went to SourceFed, which consists of short clips of people explaining things in loud, fast voices," and "It's not even close to quality programming. Just something goofy to watch online."

=== Awards and nominations ===
SourceFed was nominated for four awards at the 3rd Streamy Awards, winning in the Audience Choice for Series of the Year category. The following year, SourceFed won the award for News and Current Events Series.

Awards and nominations for SourceFed
Year	Award Show	Category	Result	Recipient(s)
2013	3rd Streamy Awards	Best News and Culture Series	Nominated	SourceFed channel
2013	3rd Streamy Awards	Best Live Series	Nominated	SourceFed: The Nation Decides 2012
2013	3rd Streamy Awards	Best Live Event	Nominated	SourceFed: #PDSLive 2012 Election Night Coverage
2013	3rd Streamy Awards	Audience Choice for Series of the Year	Won	SourceFed channel
2014	4th Streamy Awards	Audience Choice for Channel, Show, or Series of the Year	Nominated	SourceFed channel
2014	4th Streamy Awards	News and Current Events Series	Won	SourceFed channel
2015	5th Streamy Awards	Audience Choice for Channel, Show, or Series of the Year	Nominated	SourceFed channel
2015	5th Streamy Awards	Best News and Culture Series	Nominated	SourceFed channel

== See also ==
- The Valleyfolk

== Notes ==
Notes
