= Kristin Key =

American comedian (born 1980)

- Born: September 25, 1980 (age 46); Aurora, Missouri, U.S.
- Occupation: Comedian
- Website: kristinkey.com

Kristin Key (born September 25, 1980) is an American comedian who has appeared at The Improv and on the series Last Comic Standing and Bring the Funny. She favors a self-deprecating, physical, and improvisational style of comedy, drawing on lesbian themes and incorporating guitar playing and song.

Key was born in Aurora, Missouri, to a Church of Christ minister and his wife. She has an older brother. She was raised in Liberal, Kansas, until the age of 11, when she moved to Amarillo, Texas. In Amarillo, Key attended middle school, high school, and college, where she majored in paramedicine technology.

Key began stand-up comedy at the age of 19 as the house MC for the Amarillo Comedy Club. Frustrated at the limitations for success in a small town, she tried to perform at an open mic night at the local comedy club. The owners initially told her she was too young to get into the club, but eventually let her on stage and were impressed. She was offered a standing MC position. In 2005, the Amarillo Comedy Club shut down after the death of the co-owner and Key's mentor, Kelly Moran. Following the club's closing, she moved to San Marcos, Texas, to pursue comedy in the Austin scene.

Three months after moving to San Marcos, she auditioned for Last Comic Standing and was chosen. After several episodes, she finished 6th. She has since been heard on XM and Sirius Satellite Radios, is a regular on The Bob & Tom Show, and has been seen on Comics Unleashed as well as networks including VH1, Bravo, TV Guide Channel, and Fox Reality.

In 2019, Key competed in the American reality television comedy competition series Bring the Funny, making it to the second round (the "Comedy Clash").

She lives in Redondo Beach, California.

Key survived a car accident in 2013.
