= Bad Teeth =

Comedy YouTube channel

BadTeeth

YouTube information
- Channel: Bad Teeth
- Years active: 2013–2014
- Subscribers: 91.4 thousand
- Views: 10.1 million
- Last updated: August 4, 2026

Bad Teeth was a comedy YouTube channel created by Hat Trick Productions. Bad Teeth created content with traditional celebrities like Daniel Radcliffe, Idris Elba and Damian Lewis and also with people with large followings on YouTube like Cassetteboy, Stuart Ashen, and Swede Mason.

== Launch and growth ==
Bad Teeth was created as a result of the YouTube Original Channel Initiative.

The channel was soft launched in January 2013. By March it had already gained approximately 15,000 subscribers and 1.8 million video views, driven by Radcliffe’s parody guide of how to be an actor.

As of August 2013, the channel had grown to 65,000 subscribers and almost 4.5 million views. The channel ceased uploading videos in mid-2014, following the end of the Original Channel Initiative.

== Format and strategy ==
Each week, Hat Trick produced and uploaded four new videos – which topical sketches, animations, behind-the-scenes features and archive clips. The YouTube channel banner states that Wednesday is "web review" and Friday is "celebs and guests."

According to Hat Trick Head of Digital, Jonathan Davenport, the channel specifically attempted to "collaborate with as many people as possible" in order to get their videos seen by a "specific audience." He stressed that they attempted to offer "what the audience is searching for" cautioning that "lots of companies make the mistake of doing what they always do and expecting the audience to like it because of who they are.”

Bad Teeth hoped to "become a hub for British comedy series in the same way Above Average has already featured several American funnymen."

== See also ==
- YouTube Original Channels
- Multi Channel Networks
- Base79
