= Barats and Bereta =

Web-based sketch comedy duo

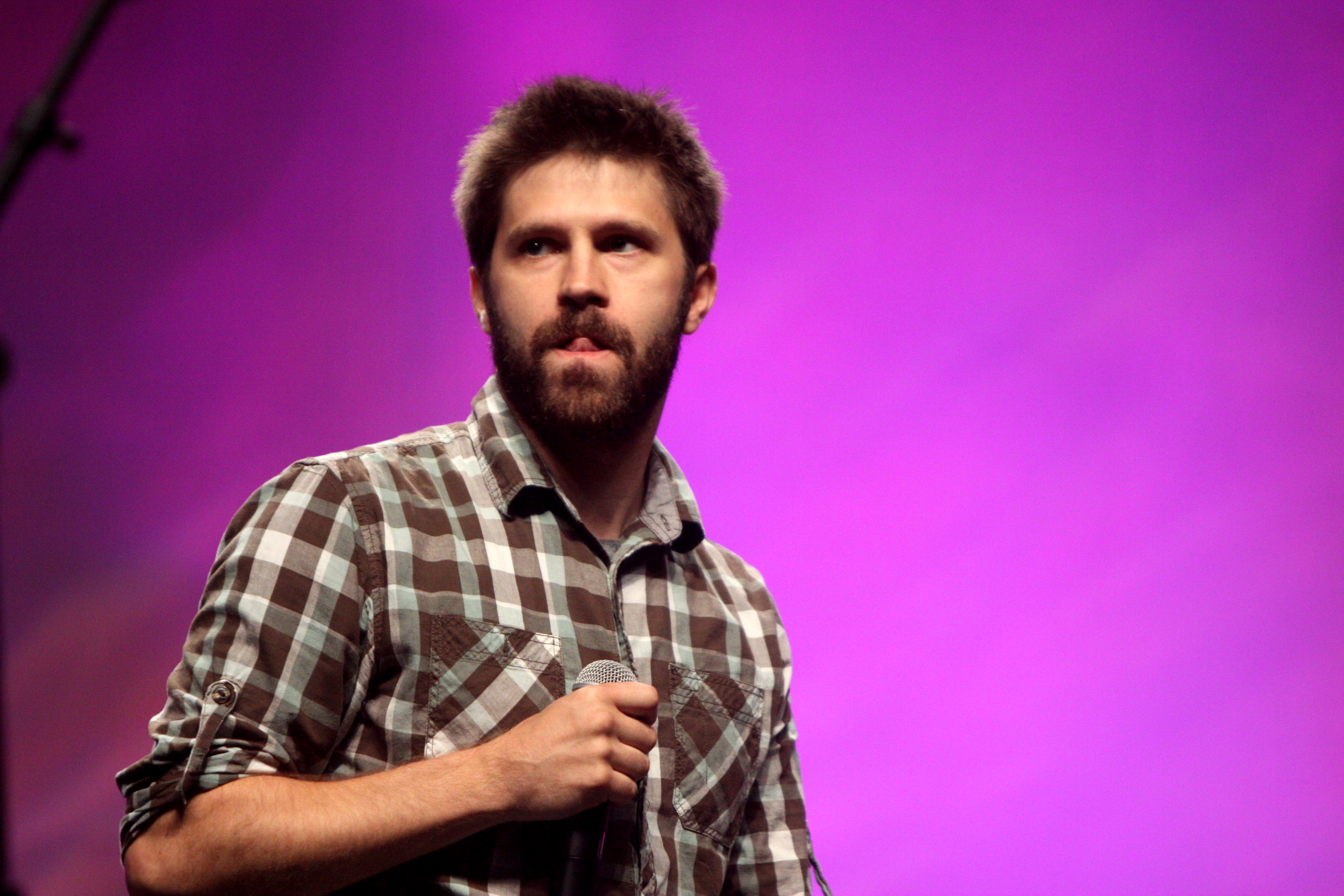
- Bereta at VidCon 2012
- Occupations: Barats: YouTube comedian, actor, producer, writer Bereta: YouTube comedian, actor, producer, writer, host
- Years active: 2003–2018

Barats and Bereta was the web-based sketch comedy duo of Luke Barats and Joseph Bereta. At its peak, their YouTube channel had over 420,000 subscribers. Both have portrayed characters on the YouTube web series Annoying Orange.

== History ==
Formed in 2003, the duo originally made videos to amuse friends, often combining real and fictional acts. They met when both were students of Gonzaga University. These videos eventually made it onto their website and onto YouTube.

NBC signed them for a one-year deal in 2006. "This is Culdesac", the sketch comedy pilot they produced, directed, wrote, edited, and acted in under contract, was not picked up by NBC. Their next television project was a more traditional sitcom. The pilot did not result in the series airing.

The Huffington Post has covered videos from the duo in multiple online publications.

In 2012, Bereta became a host on the news and current events web series, SourceFed, and would remain as a host on the channel until December 31, 2014.

In 2014, Barats and Bereta was listed on NewMediaRockstars Top 100 Channels, ranked at 50.

In 2017, both Barats and Bereta became members of the Smosh team; Barats as a writer for Smosh sketches, while Bereta worked as a content producer.

As of April 2018, Bereta is no longer working for Smosh and is working full-time on The Valleyfolk YouTube channel and company with his friends and fellow founding SourceFed hosts Elliott Morgan and Steve Zaragoza. Barats later replaced his position. In 2019, the Valleyfolk competed on the NBC comedy competition show Bring the Funny, winning the show's first season.

From 2022 to 2025, Joe Bereta worked as an executive producer and host of the YouTube channel REACT.
