= Graham Kay =

Canadian stand-up comedian

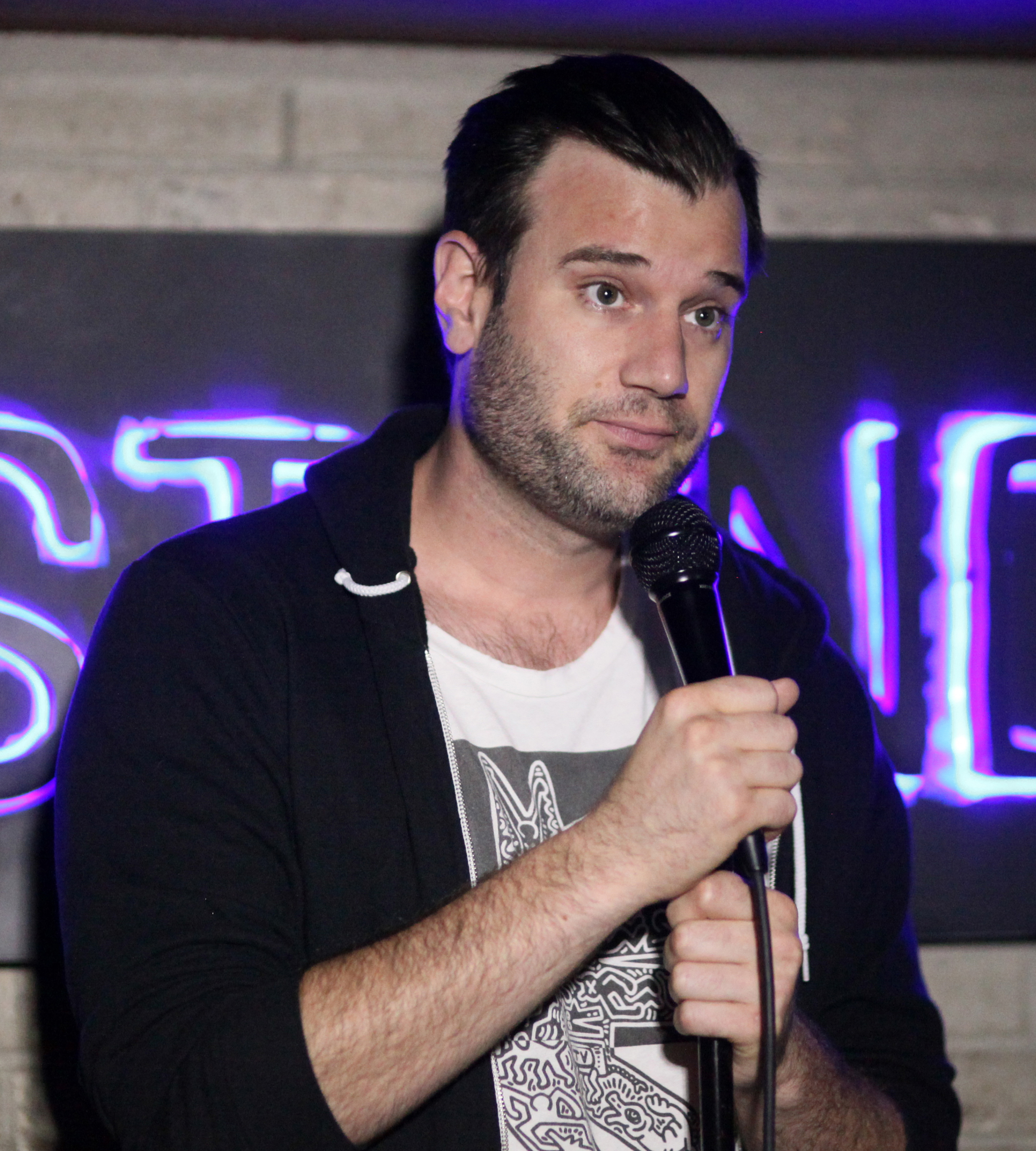
- Kay performing in August 2017
- Born: Ottawa, Ontario, Canada

Comedy career
- Medium: Stand-up, Television
- Subjects: Everyday life, Observational
- Website: www.grahamkay.com

Graham Kay (born Graham Keay) is a Canadian stand-up comedian.

He has performed stand up on The Tonight Show with Jimmy Fallon in 2021, The Late Show with Steven Colbert and NBC’s Bring The Funny in 2019. Kay has comedy specials on Crave TV (2020) and Dry Bar (2024). He also wrote for the comedy television series Spun Out from 2014-15. Kay appeared in the feature film Super Troopers 2, which premiered in April 2018. Kay is a regular performer at the Comedy Cellar in New York City and his comedy albums Live in a Bowling Alley and Girlfriend Material can be heard regularly on SiriusXM Radio.

He was nominated for a 2013 Canadian Comedy Award for Best Breakout Artist, and was runner-up at the 2013 Seattle International Comedy Competition. Kay has appeared on HLN's Dr. Drew On Call, CBC Television's George Stroumboulopoulos Tonight, and MuchMusic's Video On Trial.
