= Jesus Trejo =

American writer, comedian, and producer

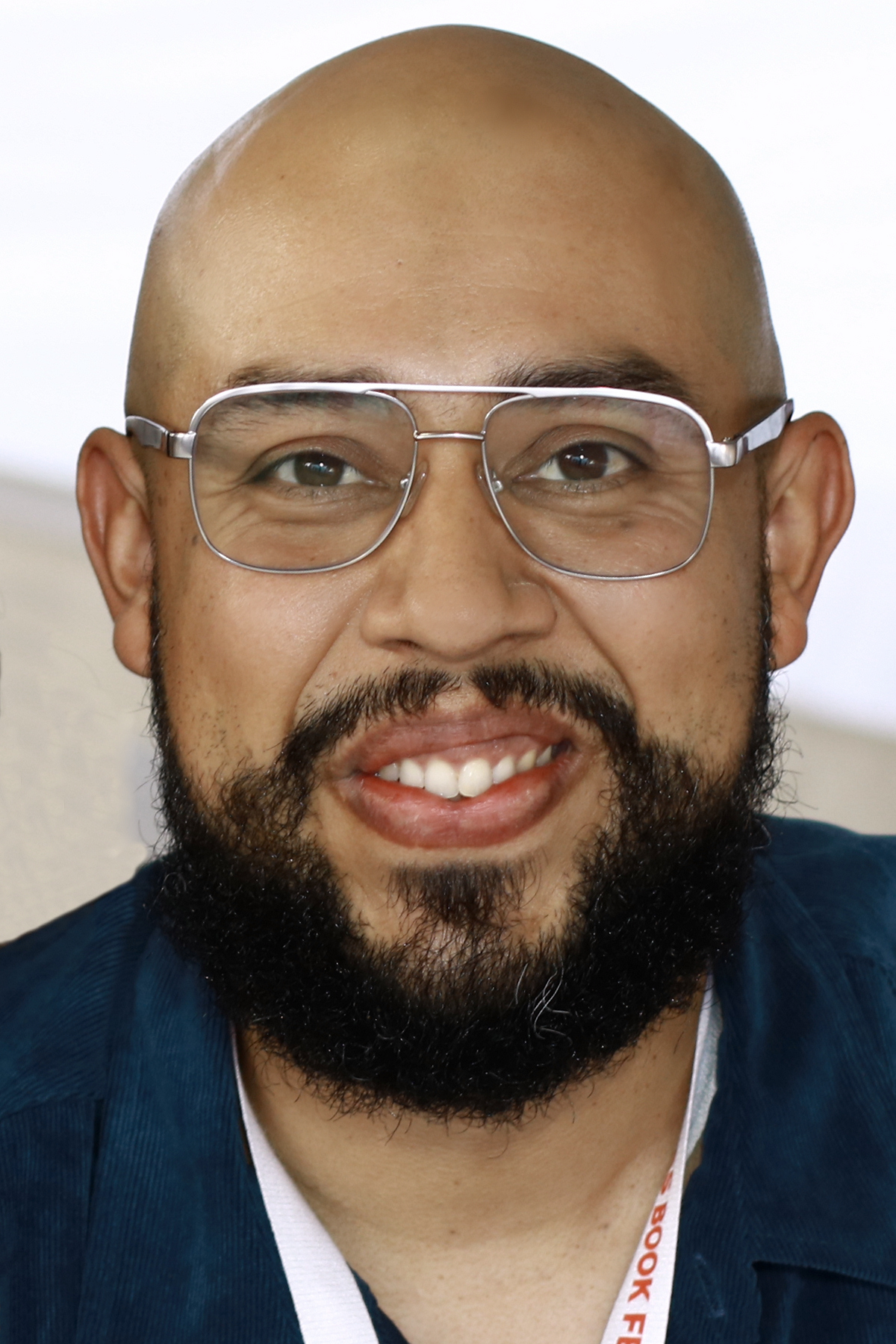
- Trejo at the Texas Book Festival in November 2024
- Born: 1986 (age 39–40); Long Beach, California, U.S.
- Education: Cal State Dominguez Hills
- Spouse: Adria Marquez

Comedy career
- Medium: Television, stand-up, film
- Subjects: Family, everyday life, pop culture
- Website: www.jesustrejo.com

Jesus Trejo (Spanish: [xeˈsus ˈtɾexo]; born 1986) is an American writer, comedian, and producer. He has released two stand-up specials, Stay At Home Son (2020) and Practicing (2023). He has acted on Mr. Iglesias and This Fool, for which he was also a writer. He hosts and produces the web series Tacos Con Todo and the PBS series Roots of Comedy.

== Career ==
Trejo began performing stand-up in his early twenties, primarily performing at the Comedy Store, where he also worked the door and as a valet, until working his way up to paid performances.

His first recurring acting role was on the TBS sitcom Sullivan & Son. In 2018 he starred in the AARP documentary Care to Laugh about being the primary caregiver to his parents, who were each battling cancer, while gaining popularity as a stand-up comic. In 2019 he was a recurring character on the Netflix sitcom Mr. Iglesias.

Trejo released his first one-hour special Stay At Home Son on Showtime in May 2020, which "explores his life as first generation Mexican-American, growing up with immigrant parents and everything from running his first marathon to winning his first fight." He is the executive producer and host for the First We Feast web series Tacos Con Todo where he tries different taco restaurants with other comedians. He had a minor acting role on Hulu's This Fool (2022–2023) and was also a staff writer.

He released his second comedy special Practicing on YouTube in 2023. That year he also published the children's book Papá’s Magical Water-Jug Clock as a tribute to children with fathers who work as landscapers, his father's profession when he was growing up. It was published in both English and Spanish. His second children's book, Mamá’s Magnificent Dancing Plantitas, was written in honor of his late mother's love of plants. His mother died in 2023. It was released in September 2024.

Trejo produces and hosts the 2024 PBS series Roots of Comedy, where he travels around the United States to talk to rising comedians.

== Personal life ==
Trejo was born and raised in Long Beach, California, the only child of Mexican immigrant parents from Jalisco and Sinaloa. He was raised speaking Spanish. Trejo attended Wilson High School and received his bachelor's degree from Cal State Dominguez Hills in business marketing.

Trejo is married to Adria Marquez.

== Accolades ==
- 2017 –Variety's 10 Comics to Watch
- 2024 – Pura Belpré Children's Author Award (for Papá’s Magical Water-Jug Clock)

== Works ==
=== Comedy specials ===
- 2020 – Stay At Home Son, Showtime
- 2023 – Practicing, YouTube

=== Books ===
- Papá’s Magical Water-Jug Clock (El Barrilito Mágico de Papá), 2023, United States, Minerva ISBN 9781662651045 publication date June 6, 2023
- Mamá’s Magnificent Dancing Plantitas (Las Magníficas Plantitas Bailadoras de Mamá), 2024, United States, Minerva ISBN 9781662651069 publication date September 10, 2024
