= YouTube Original Channel Initiative =

Program by Google to bring content to YouTube

The YouTube Original Channel Initiative was a $100 million program funded by Google in 2012 to bring original content onto YouTube. The original channel initiative was also meant to kick start Google TV. The channels are collectively known as "original", "premium" or "YouTube-funded" channels.

== History ==
In September 2012, twenty of the 100 original channels started getting at least 1 million views a week. In October, YouTube introduced 60 new original channels. Google invested an additional $200 million into the original programming as well. The top 25 original programs also averaged around 1 million views per week at the time of the announcement. However, in November, YouTube ended funding for more than 60% of the approximately 160 channels it financed as part of the initiative. After cancellation, YouTube kept all incoming revenue from these channels that failed to recoup their initial investments.

In November 2013, it was reported that the landing page for the original channels had become a redirect to a 404 error page, seemingly as a way for Google to remove any reference to the original channel initiative.

== Content ==
The content of the YouTube Original Channel Initiative includes SourceFed, Young Hollywood, The Mom's View, The Wall Street Journal, Museum of Contemporary Art, Los Angeles, Crash Course, BadTeeth, i am OTHER, The Pet Collective, Epic Level TV, Geek & Sundry, MyMusic, Frederator Networks' Cartoon Hangover, The Spangler Effect, and The Multiverse among several others. Most participants in the program created channels through their production companies. The program also partnered with celebrities from traditional media such as singer Madonna and former professional basketball player Shaquille O'Neal, who were partners with the dance channel DanceOn and the Comedy Shaq Network, respectively.

One of Tubefilter's articles includes a full list of the original channels, which differs from YouTube's listing.

Deadline Hollywood started tracking the weekly video view stats for all the channels part of YouTube's Original Channel Initiative in May 2012.

Participants included:

- Madonna
- Pharrell Williams
- Young Hollywood founder R.J. Williams
- former NBA star Shaquille O'Neal
- comedian Amy Poehler
- actor Ashton Kutcher
- The Office star Rainn Wilson
- comedian Kenny Hotz
- Motor Trend
- SourceFed
- spiritual doctor Deepak Chopra
- Modern Family actress Sofia Vergara
- Hank and John Green (via Vlogbrothers)
