= Bring the Funny =

US television series

- The cast of JK! Studios in Bring the Funny
- Genre: Reality; Talent contest
- Presented by: Amanda Seales
- Judges: Kenan Thompson; Chrissy Teigen; Jeff Foxworthy
- Country of origin: United States
- Original language: English
- No. of seasons: 1
- No. of episodes: 11

Production
- Executive producers: David Friedman; Matilda Zoltowski
- Production companies: Universal Television Alternative Studio; Just for Laughs Television; Open 4 Business Productions

Original release
- Network: NBC
- Release: July 9 – September 17, 2019

Bring the Funny is an American comedy competition series that aired on NBC from July 9 to September 17, 2019.

Hosted by comedian Amanda Seales, the series features various comedy acts performing in front of an audience for a chance to win $250,000. The first season consisted of 11 episodes: 10 regular episodes and an additional results episode for the finale. The series's panel of judges consists of Kenan Thompson, Chrissy Teigen and Jeff Foxworthy.

== Open Mic ==
The Open Mic round featured 40 contestants appearing over four episodes, with 10 acts per episode. The judges selected six out of the 10 acts in each episode to move onto the next round, the Comedy Clash; the other four acts were eliminated.

=== Week 1 ===
Participant	Genre	From	Result
Matt Rife	Standup	Los Angeles, California	Advanced
Frangela	Sketch	Los Angeles, California	Advanced
Jarred Fell	Variety	Auckland, New Zealand	Advanced
Harry & Chris	Variety	Ealing, United Kingdom	Advanced
Ali Kolbert	Standup	New York, New York	Eliminated
Ian Lara	Standup	New York, New York	Eliminated
Armando Anto	Variety	Los Angeles, California	Eliminated
Mister Zed	Variety	New Jersey	Eliminated
JK! Studios	Sketch	Provo, Utah	Advanced
Orlando Leyba	Standup	Glendale, California	Advanced

=== Week 2 ===
Participant	Genre	From	Result
Randy Feltface	Variety	Victoria, Australia	Advanced
Michael Longfellow	Standup	Los Angeles, California	Advanced
Room 28	Sketch	New York, New York	Eliminated
Willy Appleman	Sketch	Brooklyn, New York	Advanced
Daphnique Springs	Standup	Burbank, California	Eliminated
ISMO	Standup	Los Angeles, California	Advanced
Mandy Muden	Variety	London, United Kingdom	Eliminated
Regan & Watkins	Variety	Los Angeles, California	Eliminated
Morgan Jay	Variety	Los Angeles, California	Advanced
Jesus Trejo	Standup	Long Beach, California	Advanced

=== Week 3 ===
Participant	Genre	From	Result
Calvin Evans	Standup	Los Angeles, California	Advanced
Handsome Naked	Variety	Chicago, Illinois	Eliminated
Kristin Key	Variety	Redondo Beach, California	Advanced
Candice Thompson	Standup	Los Angeles, California	Eliminated
Audrey Stewart	Standup	Los Angeles, California	Eliminated
Drennon Davis	Variety	Los Angeles, California	Advanced
Andrea Lopez	Sketch	Washington, D.C.	Advanced
Lost Moon Radio	Sketch	Los Angeles, California	Eliminated
Kids These Days	Sketch	New York, New York	Advanced
Ali Siddiq	Standup	Houston, Texas	Advanced

=== Week 4 ===
Participant	Genre	From	Result
Tacarra Williams	Standup	Los Angeles, California	Advanced
The Valleyfolk	Sketch	Los Angeles, California	Advanced
Rocky Dale Davis	Standup	Brookwood, Alabama	Advanced
Lewberger	Variety	Los Angeles, California	Advanced
Rivkah Reyes	Variety	Chicago, Illinois	Eliminated
Graham Kay	Standup	Brooklyn, New York	Eliminated
Leclerc Andre	Standup	Brooklyn, New York	Eliminated
Erica Rhodes	Standup	Los Angeles, California	Advanced
The Chris and Paul Show	Sketch	Stamford, Connecticut	Advanced
Lucas Bohn	Variety	Brooklyn, New York	Eliminated

== Comedy Clash ==
The Comedy Clash features all 24 selected acts and pits them against each other. The Judges then vote on who advances to the Showcase (twelve move on, twelve are eliminated).

=== Week 5 ===
Participant	Genre	Participant
Jarred Fell	Variety	Randy Feltface
Jesus Trejo	Standup	Tacarra Williams
JK! Studios	Sketch	Kids These Days
Kristin Key	Variety	Morgan Jay

=== Week 6 ===
Participant	Genre	Participant
Harry & Chris	Variety	Lewberger
Michael Longfellow	Standup	Calvin Evans
The Chris and Paul Show	Sketch	Willy Appleman
ISMO	Standup	Erica Rhodes

=== Week 7 ===
Participant	Genre	Participant
Matt Rife	Standup	Rocky Dale Davis
Frangela	Sketch	Andrea Lopez
The Valleyfolk	Sketch/Variety	Drennon Davis
Ali Siddiq	Standup	Orlando Leyba

== Semi-final Showcase ==
The semi-final Showcase features the remaining 12 selected acts as voted by the judges. The judges will choose 2 acts from each week to move on to the finale, with the viewers choosing one act to advance to the finale as a wildcard. 7 will be Eliminated.

=== Week 8 ===
Genre	Participant	Participant	Genre
Sketch	The Chris and Paul Show	JK! Studios	Sketch
Standup	Matt Rife	Ali Siddiq	Standup
Standup	Erica Rhodes	Jarred Fell	Variety

=== Week 9 ===
Genre	Participant	Participant	Genre
Variety	Morgan Jay	Frangela	Sketch
Standup	Tacarra Williams	Michael Longfellow	Standup
Sketch	The Valleyfolk	Lewberger	Variety

== Finale ==
The finale began by revealing The Valleyfolk got the most votes from the viewers, and they return to the competition. After the episode ends, the viewers then vote on the five acts to decide who brought the funny. The winner of Bring the Funny’s first season will be revealed in a results episode the following week. Three will finish as finalists, and the winner will be announced by Amanda.

=== Week 10 ===
Participant	Genre
Lewberger	Variety
Tacarra Williams	Standup
The Chris and Paul Show	Sketch
Ali Siddiq	Standup
The Valleyfolk	Sketch

== Elimination table ==
No.	Contestant	Week									
No.	Contestant	1	2	3	4	5	6	7	8	9	10/11
1	The Valleyfolk				SAFE			WIN		WC	WINNER
2	Tacarra Williams				SAFE	WIN				SAFE	RUNNER-UP
3-5	Ali Siddiq			SAFE				WIN	SAFE		Finalist
3-5	Lewberger				SAFE		WIN			SAFE	Finalist
3-5	The Chris and Paul Show				SAFE		WIN		SAFE		Finalist
6-12	Frangela	SAFE						WIN		OUT	
6-12	Michael Longfellow		SAFE				WIN			OUT	
6-12	Morgan Jay		SAFE			WIN				OUT	
6-12	Matt Rife	SAFE						WIN	OUT		
6-12	Jarred Fell	SAFE				WIN			OUT		
6-12	JK! Studios	SAFE				WIN			OUT		
6-12	Erica Rhodes				SAFE		WIN		OUT		
13-24	Orlando Leyba	SAFE						OUT			
13-24	Drennon Davis			SAFE				OUT			
13-24	Andrea Lopez			SAFE				OUT			
13-24	Rocky Dale Davis				SAFE			OUT			
13-24	ISMO		SAFE				OUT				
13-24	Willy Appleman		SAFE				OUT				
13-24	Calvin Evans			SAFE			OUT				
13-24	Harry & Chris	SAFE					OUT				
13-24	Kristin Key			SAFE		OUT					
13-24	Kids These Days			SAFE		OUT					
13-24	Jesus Trejo		SAFE			OUT					
13-24	Randy Feltface		SAFE			OUT					
25-40	Rivkah Reyes				OUT						
25-40	Graham Kay				OUT						
25-40	Leclerc Andre				OUT						
25-40	Lucas Bohn				OUT						
25-40	Handsome Naked			OUT							
25-40	Candice Thompson			OUT							
25-40	Audrey Stewart			OUT							
25-40	Lost Moon Radio			OUT							
25-40	Room 28		OUT								
25-40	Daphnique Springs		OUT								
25-40	Mandy Muden		OUT								
25-40	Regan & Watkins		OUT								
25-40	Ali Kolbert	OUT									
25-40	Ian Lara	OUT									
25-40	Armando Anto	OUT									
25-40	Mister Zed	OUT									

This act was safe from elimination.
This act won the Comedy Clash.
This act was chosen as a wildcard.
This act did not perform.
This act was eliminated from the competition.

== Episodes ==
No.	Title	Original release date
1	"The Open Mic 1"	July 9, 2019
Judges Kenan Thompson, Chrissy Teigen and Jeff Foxworthy search for the funniest comedy act around; in The Open Mic round's first night, sketch, variety and stand-up comedy acts from all over the world give it their all to make it to the next round.
2	"The Open Mic 2"	July 16, 2019
The Open Mic round continues for the second night, as sketch, variety and stand-up comedy acts from all over the world give it their all to make it to the next round of the competition in hopes of ultimately winning the $250,000 grand prize.
3	"The Open Mic 3"	July 23, 2019
The Open Mic round continues for the third night, as sketch, variety and stand-up comedy acts from all over the world give it their all to make it to the next round of the competition in hopes of ultimately winning the $250,000 grand prize.
4	"The Open Mic 4"	July 30, 2019
In the final night of The Open Mic round, sketch, variety and stand-up comedy acts from all over the world give it their all to make it to the next round of the competition in hopes of ultimately winning the $250,000 grand prize.
5	"The Comedy Clash 1"	August 6, 2019
The Comedy Clash round begins as the best acts from the Open Mic round go head-to-head; the winner of each clash, as chosen by the judges, will advance to the semi-final Showcase and be one step closer to winning the $250,000 grand prize.
6	"The Comedy Clash 2"	August 13, 2019
The Comedy Clash round continues with the best acts from the Open Mic round going head-to-head; the winner of each clash, as chosen by the judges, advances to the semi-final Showcase and is one step closer to winning the $250,000 grand prize.
7	"The Comedy Clash 3"	August 20, 2019
The Comedy Clash round continues as the best acts from the Open Mic round will go head-to-head with another comedic act. The winner of each clash, as chosen by the judges, will advance to the semi-final Showcase and be one step closer to winning the $250,000 grand prize.
8	"The semi-final Showcase 1"	August 27, 2019
The remaining contestants from the Comedy Clash round face off in the semi-final Showcase; the judges select two acts to move on to the finale, and America can vote to save one semi-finalist.
9	"The semi-final Showcase 2"	September 3, 2019
The remaining contestants from the Comedy Clash round continue to face off in the semi-final Showcase; the judges select two acts to move on to the finale, and America can vote to save one semi-finalist.
10	"The Finale"	September 10, 2019
The remaining finalists give it their all in one final performance to impress the judges and America who will ultimately decide who wins the $250,000 grand prize and become the first ever winner of the competition.
11	"The Finale Results"	September 17, 2019
The first-ever winner is crowned; former contestants and surprise guests celebrate the season in brand-new comedy performances and skits.

== Ratings ==
Viewership and ratings per episode of Bring the Funny
No.	Title	Air date	Rating/share (18–49)	Viewers (millions)
1	"The Open Mic 1"	July 9, 2019	1.2/7	5.97
2	"The Open Mic 2"	July 16, 2019	0.9/5	4.72
3	"The Open Mic 3"	July 23, 2019	0.9/5	4.33
4	"The Open Mic 4"	July 30, 2019	0.7/4	3.53
5	"The Comedy Clash 1"	August 6, 2019	0.9/5	4.21
6	"The Comedy Clash 2"	August 13, 2019	0.7/4	3.44
7	"The Comedy Clash 3"	August 20, 2019	0.7/4	3.66
8	"The semi-final Showcase 1"	August 27, 2019	0.7/4	3.46
9	"The semi-final Showcase 2"	September 3, 2019	0.7/4	3.24
10	"The Finale"	September 10, 2019	0.7/4	3.61
11	"The Finale Results"	September 17, 2019	0.6/4	3.34

== See also ==
- Last Comic Standing, a similar show
