= Blame It on the Alcohol =

- Glee episode
- Episode no.: Season 2 Episode 14
- Directed by: Eric Stoltz
- Written by: Ian Brennan
- Production code: 2ARC14
- Original air date: February 22, 2011

Guest appearances
- Iqbal Theba as Principal Figgins; Dot-Marie Jones as Shannon Beiste; Harry Shum, Jr. as Mike Chang; Chord Overstreet as Sam Evans; Darren Criss as Blaine Anderson; Ashley Fink as Lauren Zizes; Lauren Potter as Becky Jackson

Episode chronology
← Previous "Comeback"	Next → "Sexy"
- Glee season 2

"Blame It on the Alcohol" is the fourteenth episode of the second season of the television series Glee, and the thirty-sixth overall. The episode was written by Ian Brennan, directed by Eric Stoltz and first aired in the United States on Fox on February 22, 2011. This episode mainly centers on the issues of underage drinking, as the students of McKinley High School are coming drunk to school in increasing numbers. Principal Figgins (Iqbal Theba) plans an assembly to warn the students about the dangers of underage drinking, and asks glee club director Will Schuester (Matthew Morrison) to have his students perform a song that sends positive messages about avoiding alcohol. Rachel Berry (Lea Michele) throws a party for the glee club students where almost everyone gets drunk; the partygoers wake up to hangovers, and must perform various songs about alcohol while still under the influence. The assembly ends abruptly when a song that seems to glorify alcohol is interrupted by two of the singers vomiting over the others, which scares the entire high school into avoiding drunkenness.

"Blame It on the Alcohol" was given a positive reception by many reviewers, though there was disagreement over the show's messages, including with regard to drinking alcohol. Rachel's party was lauded, as was the song performed during it, "Don't You Want Me"; the assembly song, Kesha's "Tik Tok", was also well received. This episode featured cover versions of four songs, which were all released as singles and made available for digital download. Three of the singles debuted on the Billboard Hot 100. The show's first original song appeared in this episode: "My Headband", sung by Michele as Rachel, which was not released.

Upon its premiere, the episode was watched by over 10.58 million American viewers, and it earned a 4.4/12 Nielsen rating/share in the 18–49 demographic. The episode's total viewership and ratings were slightly up from the previous episode, "Comeback", which was watched by 10.53 million American viewers, and acquired a 4.2/12 rating/share in the 18–49 demographic upon first airing on television.

== Plot ==
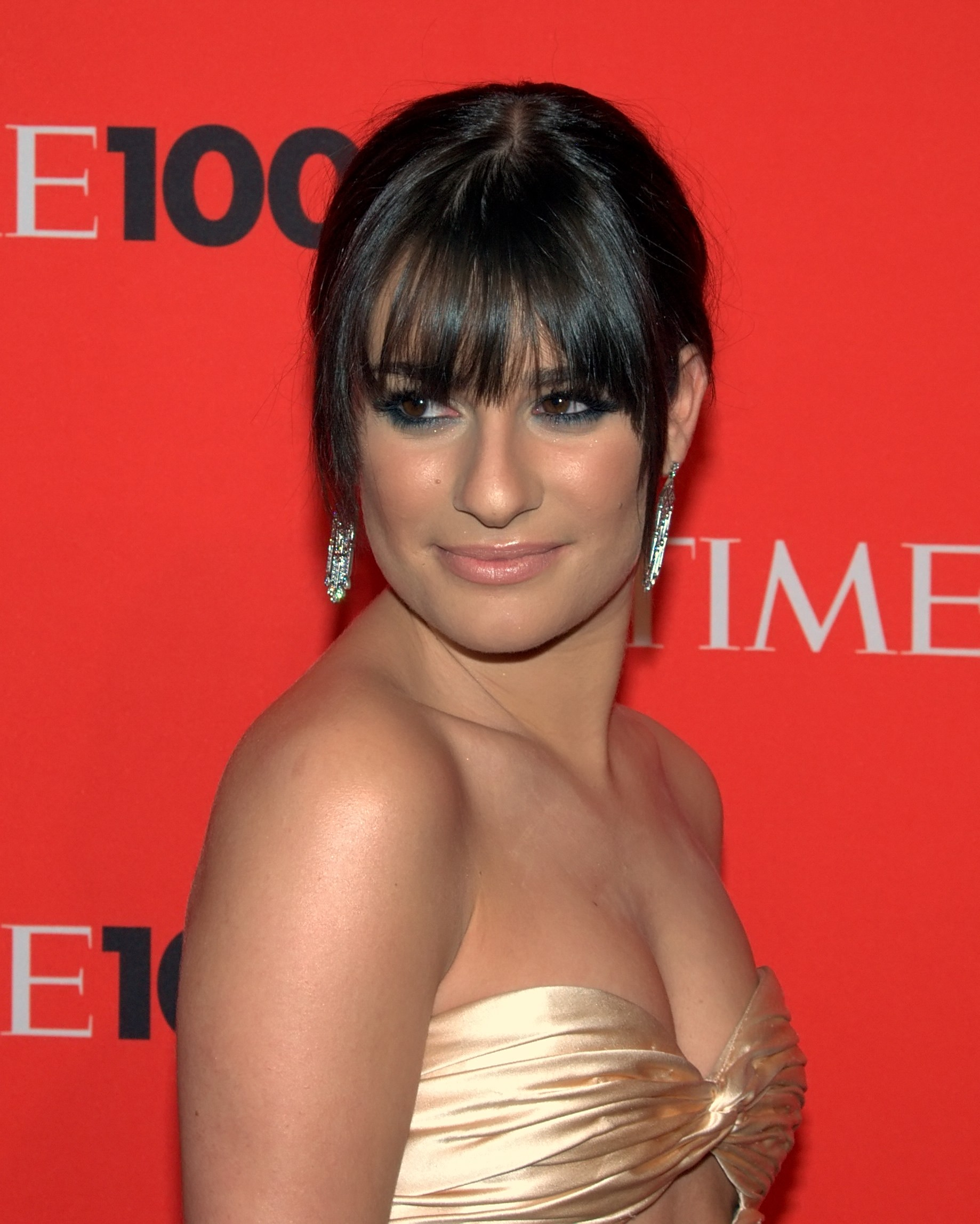
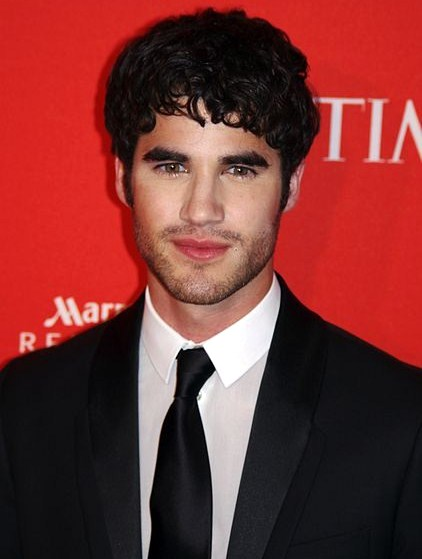
Rachel (Lea Michele, left) and Blaine (Darren Criss, right) shared a kiss and a duet during her alcohol-fueled party

Concerned about recent underage drinking incidents at McKinley High, Principal Figgins (Iqbal Theba) schedules a cautionary assembly and commissions the glee club to perform a song about the dangers of alcohol. Lead singer Rachel (Lea Michele) sings a song she has written, about her headband, to Finn (Cory Monteith); she realizes that she needs inspiration to write a song for Regionals, so she throws a house party for the club, which is also attended by former member Kurt (Chris Colfer) and his crush Blaine (Darren Criss). The attendees—except for Kurt and Finn—get drunk, and Rachel and Blaine share a long kiss during a game of Spin the Bottle, after which they perform "Don't You Want Me" as a karaoke duet. Blaine spends the night in Kurt's bed, fully clothed. Kurt's father Burt (Mike O'Malley) is not pleased about this level of intimacy under his roof and tells Kurt to ask for permission first next time. Kurt grudgingly agrees, but asks Burt to educate himself on gay relationships so Kurt can come to him for advice in the future.

On Monday, the glee club members arrive at school hung over, and perform the song "Blame It". Club director Will Schuester (Matthew Morrison) is impressed with their "realistic acting", but thinks the song is inappropriate for the assembly as it glorifies drinking. Football coach Shannon Beiste (Dot-Marie Jones) prevails on Will to join her in a night out at a cowboy bar to reduce their stress; they perform the song "One Bourbon, One Scotch, One Beer". Will gets drunk and once home, his intoxication is such that he marks all his students' papers with an "A+", and then drunk dials the school's guidance counselor Emma Pillsbury (Jayma Mays) and leaves a sexually tinged message.

Rachel asks Blaine out, and to Kurt's dismay he accepts. They argue, as Blaine suggests he might be bisexual, while Kurt denies the existence of bisexuality. Kurt visits Rachel after the date, and warns Rachel that Blaine is indeed gay, if temporarily confused. At the assembly, New Directions perform Kesha's "Tik Tok", but the song comes to an abrupt end when Brittany (Heather Morris) and Santana (Naya Rivera) throw up from intoxication. Cheerleading coach Sue Sylvester (Jane Lynch) publicly humiliates Will by playing the message he left on her voice mail—not Emma's, as he had meant to do—over the school's public address system while classes are in session. Figgins later rewards the club for their performance's success in scaring their fellow students into sobriety, in the belief that the glee club had been acting during the assembly. Figgins also tells Will that he will recommend him to his priest to get a handle on his drinking problem. Will realizes that it is hypocritical to tell the students not to abuse alcohol when he does so himself, and convinces the entire club to pledge not to drink until after their upcoming Nationals competition. He tells them he will also abstain, and urges them to call him for a ride home if they do drink, regardless of where they are or how late it is.

At the Lima Bean, Rachel kisses a sober Blaine, which makes him realize he is indeed gay, but instead of being disappointed she is elated: she tells Kurt that her relationship with a man who turned out to be gay is "songwriting gold".

== Production ==
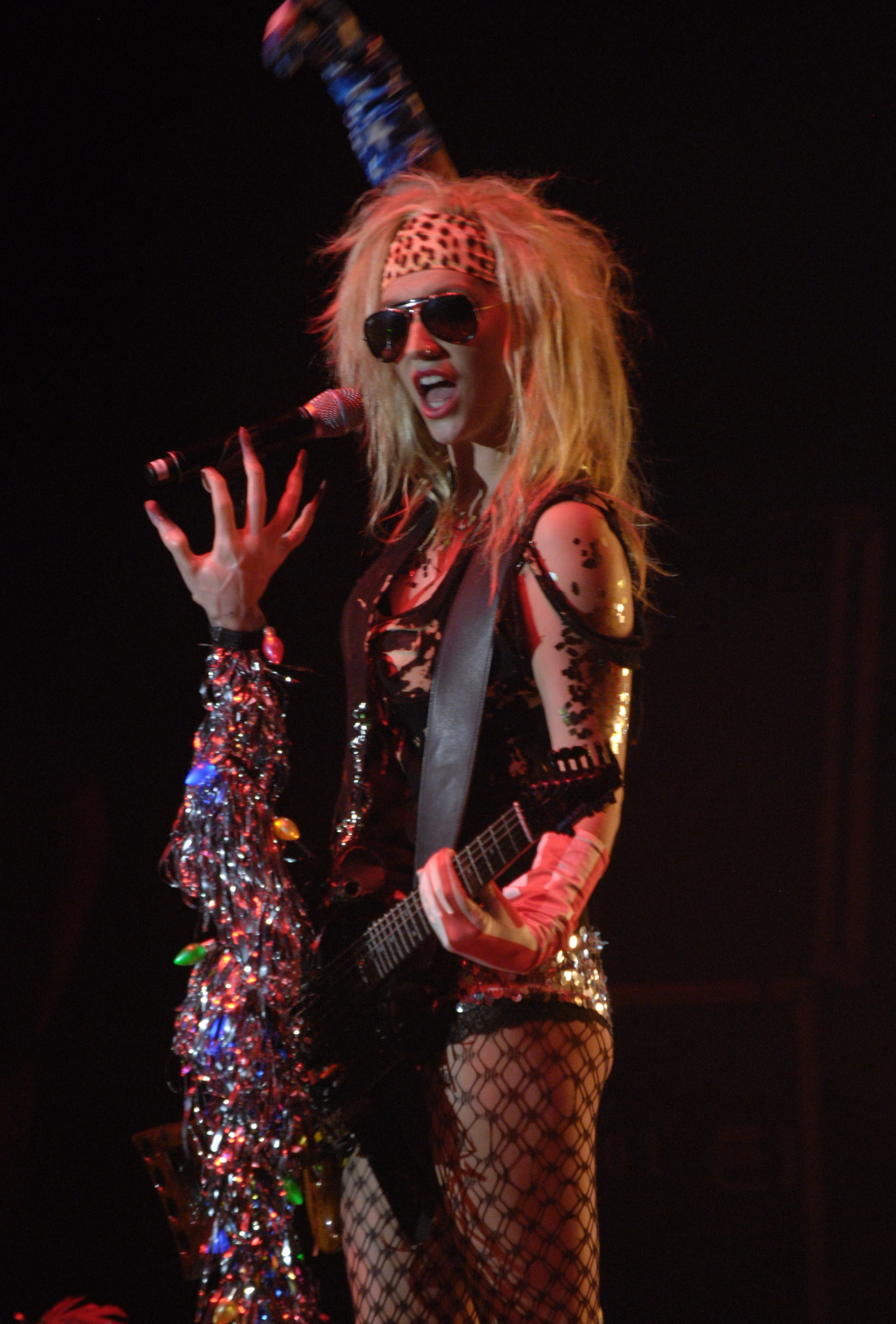
Kesha (pictured) expressed approval of the Glee cast's cover of her song "Tik Tok"

"Blame It on the Alcohol" was written by co-creator Ian Brennan and directed by Eric Stoltz in his second time as a Glee director, his first outing having been the acclaimed fourth episode of the season, "Duets".

A blind item about a "popular gay character" wondering if he might be bisexual after an "encounter" was published on February 10, 2011, by Michael Ausiello, Editor in Chief of the entertainment news website TVLine. A "firestorm of speculation" was set off, and centered on Blaine. Glee showrunner and co-creator Ryan Murphy sent an email to the Perez Hilton website, published on February 14, that stated, "Blaine is NOT bi. He is gay, and will always be gay. I think it's very important to young kids that they know this character is one of them."

Within a couple of hours, Michael Jensen of the gay website AfterElton.com took note of Murphy's statement, and also of the then-current cover article on Criss in Out magazine, in which Murphy was quoted as saying, "Blaine will openly question whether bisexuality is real. I think that some people will love that discussion and some will not love it." Jensen pointed out that Murphy does not say that Blaine will not question his own sexuality, but clearly "decides he is, in fact, gay". Ausiello posted at about that time that Blaine was indeed who he was referring to in his original story, quoted from the same Out article as Jensen, and added a new one-sentence summation from Murphy on the coming episode: "I guess the moral of the story is don’t play spin the bottle while drunk on wine coolers."

The show's first original song was included in the episode: "My Headband", sung by—and ostensibly written by—Rachel. In actuality, the song was written by Brennan, who wrote the episode, and composer James Scott Levine.

The episode featured cover versions of "Don't You Want Me" by The Human League, sung by Criss and Michele; "One Bourbon, One Scotch, One Beer" by Rudy Toombs, as recorded by George Thorogood, sung by Morrison and Jones; "Tik Tok" by Kesha, performed by Morris and New Directions, and "Blame It" by Jamie Foxx and T-Pain in a rendition by New Directions with Amber Riley and Kevin McHale as leads. "One Bourbon" marked Jones's singing debut on Glee.

Recurring guest stars who appear in the episode include glee club members Mike Chang (Harry Shum, Jr.), Sam Evans (Chord Overstreet) and Lauren Zizes (Ashley Fink), cheerleader Becky Jackson (Lauren Potter), football coach Shannon Beiste (Jones), Principal Figgins (Theba) and Kurt's friend from Dalton Academy, Blaine Anderson (Criss).

== Reception ==
=== Ratings ===
"Blame It on the Alcohol" was first broadcast on February 22, 2011 in the United States on Fox. It received over 10.58 million American viewers upon its initial airing, according to the Nielsen ratings. The episode garnered a 4.4/12 Nielsen rating/share in the 18–49 demographic, tied for the highest of the night with NCIS. The episode's total viewership and ratings slightly increased from the previous episode, "Comeback", which was watched by 10.53 million American viewers and received a 4.2/12 rating/share in the 18–49 demographic during its original airing.

With its Canadian broadcast, also on February 22, 2011, "Blame It on the Alcohol" drew 1.89 million viewers and placed fourteenth in the weekly program rankings. This was an improvement on "Comeback", which aired the week before, ranked eighteenth and was watched by 1.75 million viewers. In Australia, the episode was watched by 1.02 million viewers on March 7, 2011, which made Glee the sixth most-watched show of the night and twentieth of the week. In the UK, the episode was broadcast on April 11, 2011. It attained 2.53 million viewers—2.05 million on E4, and 483,000 on E4+1—and was the most-watched show on cable for the week. Viewership was marginally down from "Comeback", attracting 40,000 fewer viewers.

=== Critical response ===
Reaction to the episode was split. While the majority of reviewers were favorably impressed, some very much so, a significant minority were disappointed at the message the episode conveyed and the storytelling decisions. Among the former were Kevin Fallon of The Atlantic, who described it as "Glee at its best: cartoonish, outlandish, and loud—but still oh-so true to life." IGN's Robert Canning gave the episode a "great" rating of 8 out of 10, and called the main storyline "comical and human". Candace Bulter of ScreenCrave also gave the episode an 8 out of 10, and wrote, "This week's Glee puts on the beer goggles to put alcohol-related issues in perspective. The result is humorous and ironic, but leaves something to be wanted." Emily VanDerWerff of The A.V. Club, wrote that "the underpinnings of the episode aren't terrible, just overstuffed" and gave it a "B−". MTV's Aly Semigran stated that the episode "left something of a sour taste", and added that while the show "always combines humor with serious life lessons, it seems there were none to be found here"; she called the episode "a wasted opportunity". BuddyTV's Jen Harper was also disenchanted by the episode, and concluded, "Geez Louise, Glee. What's happened to you?" Amy Reiter of the Los Angeles Times saw the show's message differently from Semigran, and wrote, "Leave it to Glee to tackle a potentially joyless, didactic topic like teenage drinking and somehow manage to entertain and surprise and get its important life lessons across." Time's Richard Corliss called it a "breezy, sharply written episode" and rated it in the "high-middle range" for the show. He concluded, "Last night’s hour of Glee was of the level a superior series sticks in mid-season between its 'important' episodes. If this is coasting, take me along for the ride."

The scenes that featured Rachel's party were acclaimed by most reviewers. Fallon called them "a parade of the funniest sight gags, most uninhibited acting, and—interestingly enough—most relatable scenes Glee has produced in a while", and described Michele as "an acting stand out" who "handled the entire arc like a seasoned comedienne". His colleague Meghan Brown said it "showed Glee at its best", and added: "The dialogue was snappy, the group dynamic was clean and specific, and the kids seemed like actual kids." VanDerWerff also pointed out that the club members "really felt like kids, not like miniature 30-somethings", and said the party was the "best part" of the episode. Erica Futterman of Rolling Stone praised Finn's breakdown of "the five drunk girl archetypes, as demonstrated by the glee girls". Harper wrote that the party scenes "left a lot to be desired", and Patrick Burns, the third reviewer from The Atlantic, "waited for the Glee party to get out of control, or for someone to get hurt so that America's youth could be shocked and appalled by the dangers of drinking", but "the worst thing that happened was that Rachel tried to flip a gay guy".

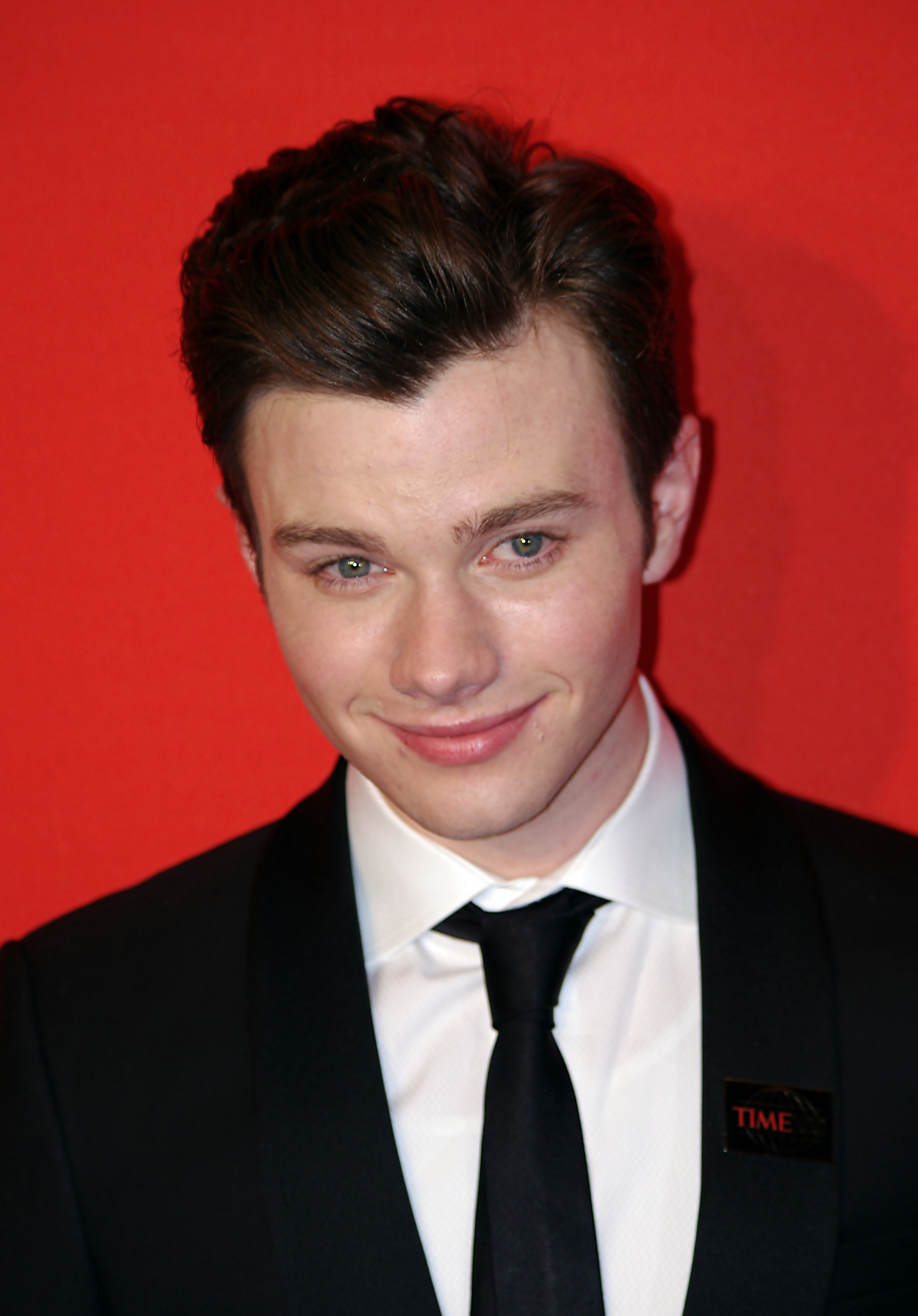
Kurt (Chris Colfer, pictured) was characterized as unfair and unreasonable in the episode

Kurt's scenes with Blaine and with his father evoked very divergent opinions from reviewers. Canning made mention of "a great conversation between Blaine and Kurt that felt very real for kids in this situation" and noted he was "glad it wasn't an easy talk for either of them". The Houston Chronicle's Bobby Hankinson agreed, and said of their "debate over the existence of bisexuality" that "it was refreshing to see Glee portray a conversation like it really goes down in reality. It’s also good to see them not treat Kurt like such a saint all the time." Semigran wrote that Kurt showed "an unflattering side of himself", and Gonzalez stated that she "was completely on Blaine's side here": Kurt "wasn't fair" and "was sort of unlikable" for once, though she did add that "he's allowed to be flawed". Blaine's "sudden confusion over his sexual orientation" was deemed a "false note" by Reiter, who called his "overwrought speech" at the Lima Bean "off-key". Harper was unhappy that "major plot points like a gay character thinking he might be bi or straight get instigated, sorted out and wrapped up within an hour", and said she thought it was "hurtful" for Blaine to "accept a date with Kurt's friend" after he and Kurt had "agreed to sort of work on a potential relationship between the two of them" in the "Silly Love Songs" episode.

There were similar reactions to Kurt's scene with Burt, though reviewers agreed that Burt was being reasonable and Kurt was not. Gonzalez characterized Kurt as "more flawed in this episode than he has been, especially in that scene with his dad when he kept taking offense to his dad's miscommunicated guidelines for sleepovers", and Semigran described "Kurt's overreaction" as "even more unsettling" than his argument with Blaine. Corliss wrote that Kurt's "smackdown of his father has the odor of propaganda from the gayest show in TV history". Canning said he was "moved by Kurt asking his father to step out of his comfort zone and educate himself about what is gay men do when [they're] together", and Gonzalez enjoyed "the very realistic tension that exists between them as father and gay son".

Harper was harshly critical of "the inane story line" where Sue regularly accused Will of being an alcoholic, to which Semigran also took exception. Reiter characterized "Sue throwing Aural Intensity's 'chipper homosexual' choir director down the stairs, twice" as a "false note" and said it was "particularly difficult to take", though VanDerWerff called it "kind of funny". Semigran was one reviewer who noted that Mercedes was wrong when she "complains that there are no songs that convey alcohol is bad". She suggested "Pink's 'Sober' or Pearl Jam's haunting cover of 'Last Kiss' or Simple Plan's moving '(Untitled) How Could This Happen to Me?'" as songs that New Directions could have done for the assembly.

=== Music and performances ===
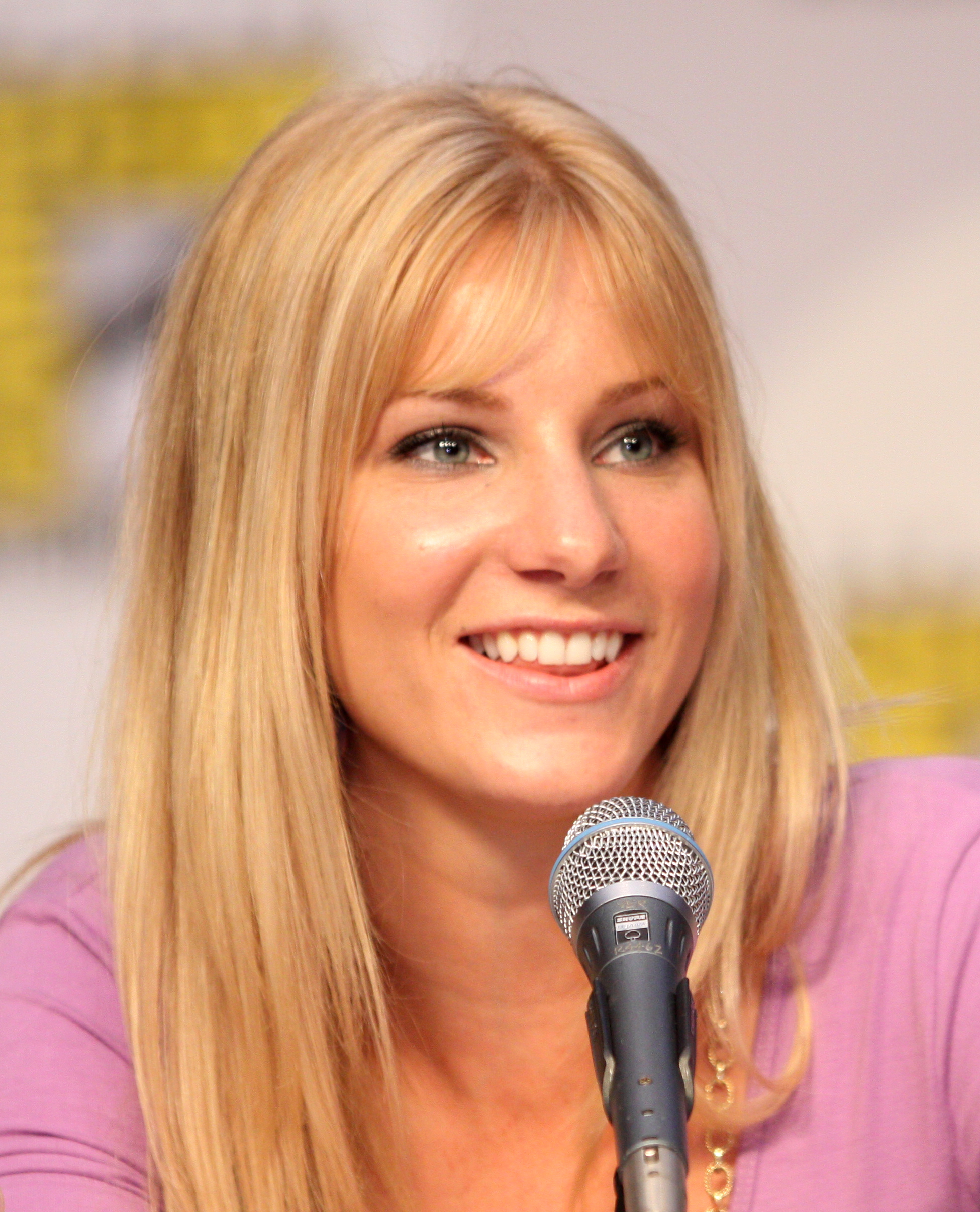
The choreography and overall performance of Heather Morris (pictured) as Brittany in the cover version of "Tik Tok" was met with critical acclaim.

The musical covers and performances for the episode were given a mostly positive reception by reviewers. Rachel and Blaine's duet of "Don't You Want Me" was called "the best number of the episode" by VanDerWerff. Semigran went further and said it was the "best number by far", and Hankinson went beyond that: "it may be one of my favorite Gleeformances of all time". Futterman called it "fun" and "flirty", and noted that "it pits Glee's most well-rounded pop vocalists against each other". Anthony Benigno of The Faster Times and Gonzalez both gave the performance an "A"; Benigno wrote that "it sounds like a modernized version of an old song and it totally, 1000% works", and Gonzalez declared that "Blaine needs to join New Directions so we can get more duets between him and Rachel". Harper, while she characterized it as a "really cute duet", said she was "not super-keen on seeing them pair up again". Brett Berk of Vanity Fair was even less enthusiastic, and gave it two stars out of five.

Berk was more enthusiastic about "Blame It" and gave it four stars out of five; he wrote, "This should be the song they sing at Nationals". Gonzalez called it "one of the better R&B performances we've seen from the Glee gang in a while", and gave it an "A". Billboard's Katie Morgan thought that "this version might be better than the original", while Harper was quite sure, and declared that it was "way better than the Jamie Foxx version". Futterman, though she described it as a "very informed rendition", said that "the song was too clean-scrubbed to pass for a dirty club hit". Benigno, while he liked "the harmonies in the hook", said the song was "very skippable" and gave it a "B". VanDerWerff said it was "one of the least enjoyable numbers of this season".

Benigno gave a "B+" to "One Bourbon, One Scotch, One Beer". He noted that "Glee can slum with the best of 'em when the occasion calls for it", and added "it's the total lack of irony that ends up making this one so good". Gonzalez was "prepared to hate" the song, but that Jones and Morrison clearly "had fun recording this song", and since "country is 70 percent attitude", she ultimately gave it a "B". Bulter wrote that she "can’t wait for more of Beiste’s alto country vibes to be showcased".

Morris as Brittany was lauded for her performance in "Tik Tok", which Bulter called the "performance of the night" and praised her "mad dance skills and awesome vocals". Reiter wrote that Brittany "owned that rendition", and CNN's Lisa Respers France gave "kudos to Brittany for her awesome performance". Benigno gave the song an "A−", noted that Morris has a better voice than the original artist, Kesha, and the rendition was a case of "a bunch of really talented kids making a simple song better". Futterman praised the "dance-centered performance", but said she wished Rachel or Mercedes had sung lead. VanDerWerff "really liked" Morris on the number, but said he "didn't buy" that it was the song selected for the assembly.

=== Chart history ===
Of the four cover versions released as singles—the original song "My Headband" was not released—three debuted on the Billboard Hot 100 and appeared on other musical charts. On the Hot 100, the show's rendition of "Don't You Want Me" debuted at number forty-nine; it was at number fifty on the Billboard Canadian Hot 100. The other two songs on the Hot 100 were "Blame It" at number fifty-five, which also made number sixty-one on the Canadian Hot 100, and "Tik Tok" at number sixty-one, which also made number fifty-six on the Canadian Hot 100. "Don't You Want Me" was also featured on the sixth soundtrack album of the series, Glee: The Music, Volume 5. "One Bourbon, One Scotch, One Beer" did not chart.
