= Comeback (Glee) =

- Glee episode
- Episode no.: Season 2 Episode 13
- Directed by: Bradley Buecker
- Written by: Ryan Murphy
- Production code: 2ARC13
- Original air date: February 15, 2011

Guest appearances
- Iqbal Theba as Principal Figgins; Harry Shum Jr. as Mike Chang; Chord Overstreet as Sam Evans; Ashley Fink as Lauren Zizes; Charlene Amoia as Nurse Bailey

Episode chronology
← Previous "Silly Love Songs"	Next → "Blame It on the Alcohol"
- Glee season 2

"Comeback" is the thirteenth episode of the second season of the American musical television series Glee, and the thirty-fifth overall. It was written by series creator Ryan Murphy, directed by Bradley Buecker, and premiered on Fox on February 15, 2011. In the episode, glee club director Will Schuester (Matthew Morrison) allows cheerleading coach Sue Sylvester (Jane Lynch) to join the McKinley High glee club in an attempt to ease her depression. Club member Sam (Chord Overstreet) creates a tribute band to teen singer Justin Bieber in order to win the heart of Quinn (Dianna Agron), and is later joined by the group's other male members, minus co-captain Finn (Cory Monteith), to recreate Bieber's "Somebody to Love" and woo their significant others.

Prior to broadcast, Murphy dismissed rumors that "Comeback" would serve as a tribute to Bieber, and stated that such episodes are reserved for artists with extensive musical catalogs. "Comeback" was met with mixed reception from critics, who deemed it neither bad nor a standout. Critics such as Bobby Hankinson of the Houston Chronicle appreciated the episode's early Glee aesthetic. Amy Reiter of the Los Angeles Times felt that the episode lacked substance. Sue's storyline, which focuses on her depression and a suicide attempt with Flintstone gummies, was widely criticized for its inappropriateness. The other storylines had mixed to positive reviews, as many critics deemed the Bieber-related subplot the strongest. James Poniewozik of Time compared it favorably to the Madonna tribute episode "The Power of Madonna".

The episode features six musical performances, five of which were released as singles. Upon its initial airing, "Comeback" was watched by over 10.53 million US viewers, and acquired a 4.2/12 Nielsen rating/share in the 18–49 demographic. Unlike the story itself, most critics received the musical numbers with acclaim. The Glee take on Bieber's songs was praised, as were the vocals of cast members Amber Riley and Lea Michele in their duet of "Take Me or Leave Me" from Rent, and the confidence and performance of Ashley Fink in "I Know What Boys Like".

== Plot ==
After her cheerleading squad loses a competition for the first time in seven years, coach Sue Sylvester (Jane Lynch) becomes depressed, and stages an apparent suicide by "overdosing" on gummy vitamins. Her colleague, school guidance counselor Emma Pillsbury (Jayma Mays), suggests that she temporarily join the school glee club, New Directions, to lift her spirits. Hoping to create discord within the group, Sue pits members Mercedes (Amber Riley) and Rachel (Lea Michele) against one another. Her plan backfires when a duet between the two results in a deepening of their respect for one another vocally. In an attempt to bring out the good in Sue, club director Will Schuester (Matthew Morrison) takes her to a pediatric cancer ward, where they sing "This Little Light of Mine" with the patients.

Club member Sam Evans (Chord Overstreet) establishes a one-man tribute band to teen singer Justin Bieber, which he calls "The Justin Bieber Experience", in the hope of winning over his girlfriend Quinn (Dianna Agron), whom he suspects still has feelings for her ex-boyfriend Finn (Cory Monteith). Sam performs Bieber's "Baby" for the glee club, and dedicates it to Quinn; the performance also excites the other girls in the club. Several of the male members—Puck (Mark Salling), Artie (Kevin McHale) and Mike (Harry Shum Jr.)—are impressed by the effect he has on the girls, and convince him to let them join his tribute band. The foursome then perform "Somebody to Love", and recreate the music video for the song in the auditorium, which makes the girls go crazy. Quinn realizes during the performance that she no longer wants Finn but that she wants to be with Sam instead, but when Santana Lopez (Naya Rivera) convinces Sam that Quinn cheated on him, he breaks up with her and begins dating Santana.

Meanwhile, Lauren Zizes (Ashley Fink) enlists Puck to help her with her first glee club solo. With Puck's assistance, she performs "I Know What Boys Like" by The Waitresses, and using a trick he taught her, imagines the club members in their underwear for confidence. Later, Sue suggests that the club perform the anthem "Sing" by My Chemical Romance, as they must present an anthem at the forthcoming Regionals competition. They rehearse the song, and it is well received by most of the members, who disregard Rachel's suggestion that they should instead compose an original anthem. Her week with New Directions over, Sue reveals that she has become the vocal coach for one of the glee club's Regionals competitors, Aural Intensity.

== Production ==
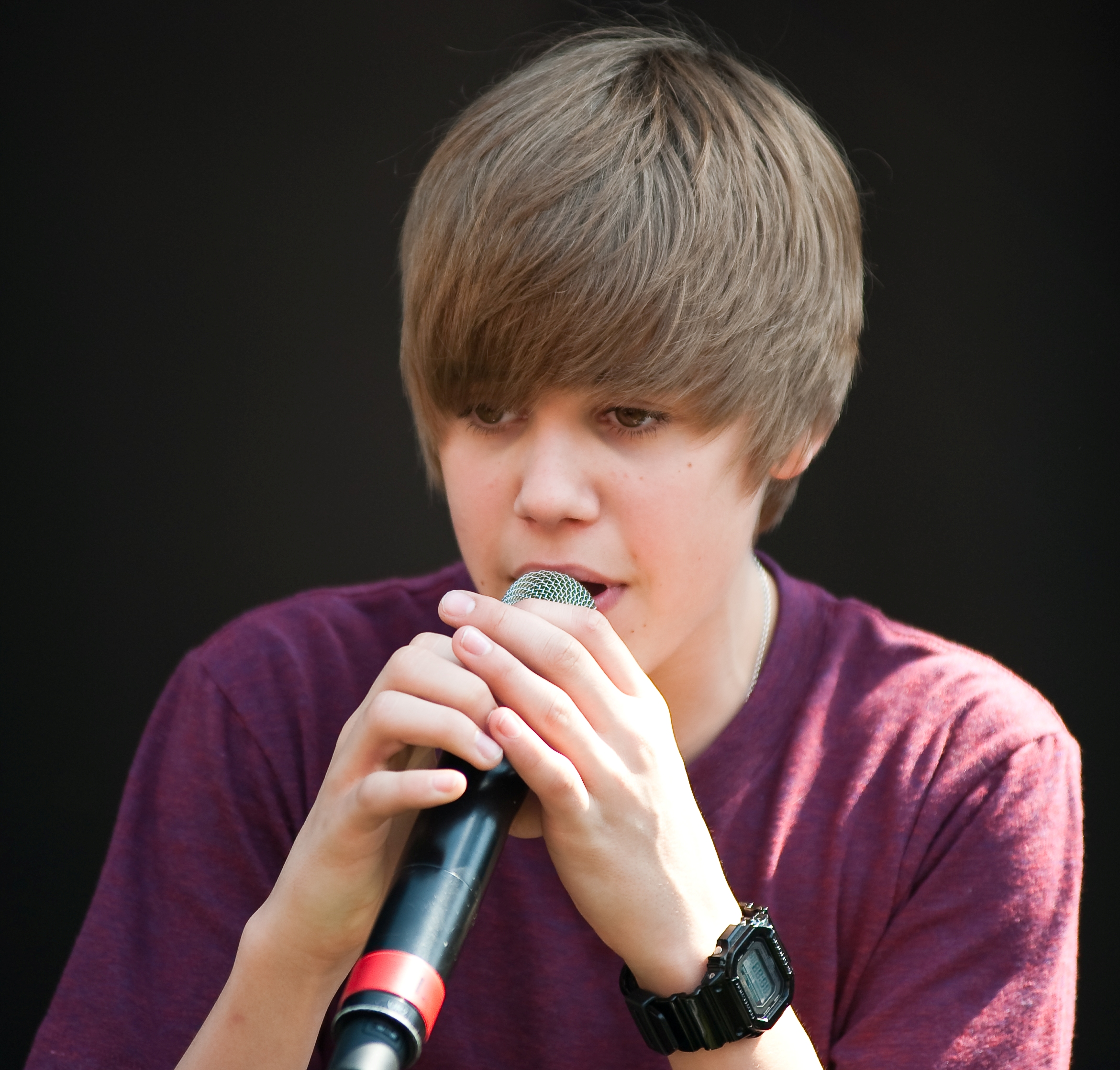
Bieber (pictured) was "truly honoured" by the use of his songs in "Comeback".

In January 2011, rumors began to circulate that Glee was planning a Justin Bieber tribute episode, similar to "The Power of Madonna" for Madonna, and "Britney/Brittany" for Britney Spears. Series creator Ryan Murphy refuted the claims, and stated that such episodes are reserved for artists with extensive musical catalogs. He confirmed, however, that Bieber's music would be used in an episode in season two as a "small plot point", and Overstreet's Sam would perform a song by the artist for Quinn's approval. On the red carpet at the 68th Golden Globe Awards, cast member Riley confirmed to MTV News that Bieber's songs "Baby" and "Somebody to Love" would be featured in the upcoming episode, and the singer would receive a tribute similar to Lady Gaga in "Theatricality"—a tribute, but without a full episode devoted to his catalog. Via his official Facebook page, Bieber stated that he was "truly honoured" to have his music covered on Glee. Prior to broadcast, Overstreet and Bieber interacted via the social networking website Twitter, where Bieber told him "we just gotta work on those moves", and to "kill it!"

In addition to "Baby" and "Somebody to Love", the episode featured cover versions of "I Know What Boys Like" by The Waitresses performed by Fink, "Take Me or Leave Me" from Rent performed by Michele and Riley, "Sing" by My Chemical Romance, and an acoustic performance of the gospel children's song "This Little Light of Mine". The pediatric oncology scenes were filmed at the Children's Hospital Los Angeles' Center for Cancer and Blood Diseases, where eleven real patients performed alongside Morrison and Lynch. Bailey, the pediatric ward nurse, was played by guest-star Charlene Amoia, who had worked for the series' sound department during the first season. In June 2011, she deemed her "Comeback" appearance her favorite guest role in any series, due to working alongside the children, whom she was "so touched by". Amoia expanded: "They were the most vibrant, energetic kids. It was a really awesome storyline to be a part of. I was really moved by everything." Though she was not initially aware that the role would involve singing, Amoia was part of the "This Little Light of Mine" group number. The episode's recurring guest cast members were Overstreet as Sam, Iqbal Theba as Principal Figgins, Shum Jr. as Mike and Fink as Lauren.

== Reception ==
=== Ratings ===
"Comeback" was watched by 10.53 million US viewers. It attained a 4.2/12 Nielsen rating/share in the 18–49 demographic, which made it the highest rated show of the night. It was the third most-watched scripted show of the week amongst adults aged 18–49, and placed 21st amongst all viewers. The episode declined by 9 percent and 1.12 million viewers on the previous episode, "Silly Love Songs".

With its Canadian broadcast, also on February 15, 2011, "Comeback" attained 1.75 million viewers and placed 18th in the weekly program rankings. It was again down on "Silly Love Songs", which ranked tenth and was watched by 2.08 million viewers. In Australia, where the episode aired on February 28, 2011, it was watched by 909,000 viewers and was the 11th most-viewed show of the night. Viewership was marginally down on the previous episode, which attracted 921,000 viewers and also placed 11th. In the UK, the episode was broadcast on April 4, 2011. It attained 2.57 million viewers—2.14 million on E4, and 427,000 on E4+1—and was the most-watched show on cable for the week. Viewership again declined slightly from the previous episode, which drew 2.63 million viewers.

=== Critical response ===
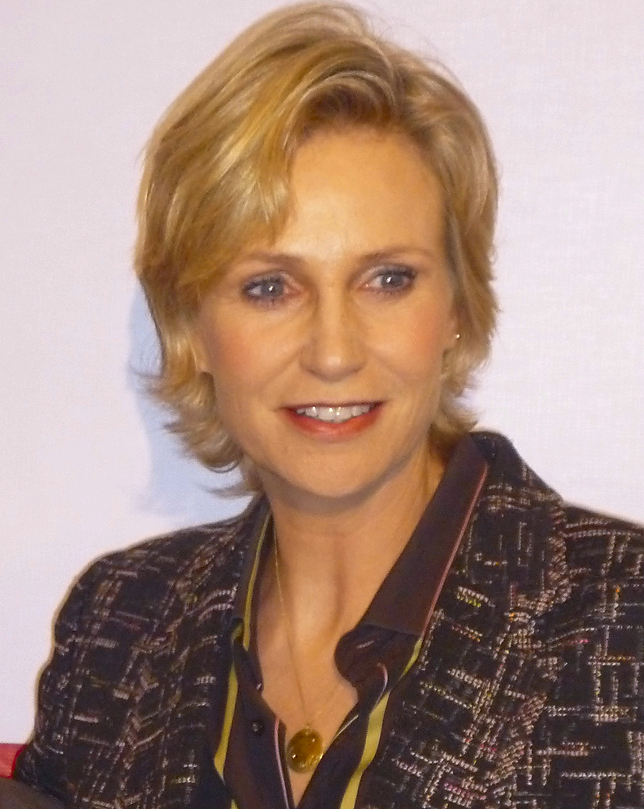
Sue (Lynch, pictured) is featured in her first ensemble number with the glee club in this episode. Her story in "Comeback" attracted many negative reviews.

The episode received mixed reviews from critics. Bobby Hankinson of the Houston Chronicle and E! Online's Jenna Mullins were pleased by how "Comeback" reminded them of early episodes of Glee—Mullins hailed the return of familiar characterization, and Hankinson commented: "It felt like old times, and it felt good." Though he observed that the episode was light on plot, Hankinson praised the writing and comedy. CNN's Lisa Respers France found the episode's title apt, as Glee was "firing on all cylinders" with little room for improvement. Erica Futterman of Rolling Stone was "pleasantly surprised", as she had anticipated a decline in quality from the previous episode, and Kevin Fallon of The Atlantic commented that apart from the Bieber jokes, "the rest of the episode was sharply written and loaded with self-referential jokes". Other critics found "Comeback" mediocre. Entertainment Weekly's Sandra Gonzalez wrote that it was "a bit off", The A.V. Club's Emily VanDerWerff felt that "something was missing, making the whole thing stultifying, lifeless, and boring", and Robert Canning of IGN deemed it "fine and inoffensive", but ultimately forgettable. Amy Reiter of the Los Angeles Times was "a little disappointed" in the episode for a lack of substance, creativity and emotional maturity. James Poniewozik of Time deemed it amongst his least favorite episodes, for "not even [being] bad in a memorable way". He noted that "Comeback" was "essentially a collection of subplots", and questioned its purpose.

The Sue storyline garnered many unfavorable reviews. Reiter criticized her inconsistent characterization, which made her actions seem "like fragments pasted together to form a disjointed collage". While VanDerWerff was more favorable, he wrote that Sue's jokes about committing "Sue-icide" were "neither dark enough to provoke a startled burst or laughter nor funny enough to overcome their central tastelessness", and called the scene in the pediatric oncology ward "woefully misjudged and inappropriately hilarious". The Atlantic's Meghan Brown found the use of seriously ill children "borderline offensive", and called Sue's suicide attempt "in totally bad taste". Miriam Krule of NPR felt that Glee treated suicide too lightly, and in doing so sent a mixed message to its youth audience. Poniewozik wrote that Sue has become "a burden on the show", and described her as "a breakout character who's broken out of the constraints of recognizable character". He questioned the point of her arc, and suggested that the attempt at humanizing her was redundant, as viewers already know Sue to be capable of compassion.

Other storylines received a more mixed response. Canning disliked the focus placed on Sam and his thin, "loveable dope" characterization. He found that the love-triangle plot made little sense, and as such was hard to invest in. In contrast, Poniewozik called Sam's Bieber subplot the episode's strongest element, and deemed it fun if inessential. He praised Glee for capturing the "disposable fun" of Bieber's music, "without either sneering at it or making it more than it is", and called it better in this respect than "The Power of Madonna". Lauren received several positive reviews. While VanDerWerff found her relationship with Puck "a lot less assured" than in "Silly Love Songs", Mullins and Gonzalez praised their "endearing" dynamic. Reiter felt that in "Comeback", while new characters like Sam and Lauren "managed to shine", established favorites fared less well: "Finn continues to be dismayingly drained of all that once made him so adorable, and Rachel, too, has been deprived of the depth and sex appeal she so carefully developed over time." Several critics raised similar criticism of Rachel—Gonzalez found her need for Brittany's help "too much of a regression", and disliked her return to "old, desperate habits" after several episodes of personal growth. Canning felt that the storyline was forced, and Poniewozik observed that the episode "seemed to be trying less to advance her character [than] simply to give her something to do." VanDerWerff wrote that Rachel appeared to have five different subplots, none of which came together cohesively, and that it reflected the awkward construction of the episode.

=== Music and performances ===
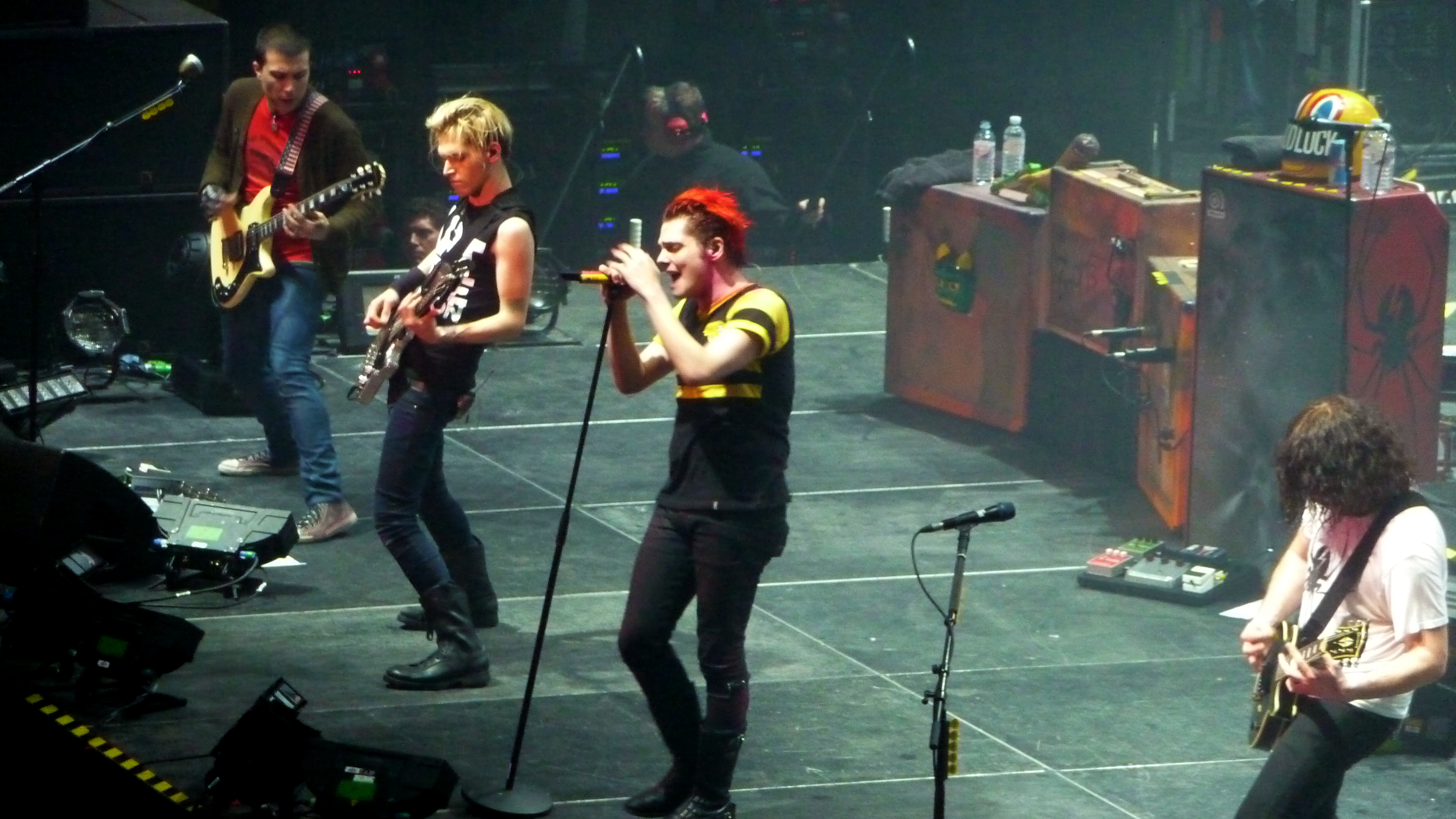
"Sing" by My Chemical Romance (pictured) was one of six songs featured in the episode.

The episode's musical covers and performances were mostly well received by critics. Hankinson wrote that the songs "blended all of the show's best charms", which he listed as "kitschy suprise [sic]", "slick production" and "raw vocal ability". Futterman also praised all of the music.

The Bieber numbers received a mostly positive reception. Mullins complimented them both, particularly Overstreet's performance of "Baby". Futterman said this performance was impressive, "a total pop star package that recalled the Biebs' swag". She found this element "smooth[ed] over" in "Somebody to Love", but called the recreation admirable nonetheless. Gonzalez highlighted the Bieber songs as the best of the episode; she gave "Baby" and "Somebody to Love" grades of "A" and "B+", respectively. On the former song, Gonzalez enjoyed Sam's performance, particularly his "übercorny dance moves that made [her] ache for the boy-band era." Although she complimented the male vocalists and their "almost perfect re-creation" of the video, Gonzalez was disappointed the show chose to repeat, rather than reinterpret, the choreography. Fallon praised the two songs: he called Sam "quite charming while channeling Bieber" and said "the acoustic opening to 'Baby' was actually very sweet, just as it was when Biebs stripped down the tune to open his Grammy performance". He added that the dancing "stood out" in "Somebody to Love". Raymund Flandez of The Wall Street Journal expressed disappointment in the Bieber performances "displayed so awkwardly and so undynamically" by Sam. On "Baby", he opined that Overstreet lacked "swagger", coordination and charm. He was more impressed by the rendition of "Somebody to Love", but noted that Sam was vocally overshadowed by Artie.

It's unfathomable that it's taken this long for the two vocal powerhouses to duet, but the exhilarating performance was worth the wait. It's always fun watching Michele, a Broadway veteran, sing a song that she's clearly been rehearsing for years. Countering with her unique brand of runs and range, Riley sassed up the arrangement with enough melisma to make the Glee version of the oft-covered modern musical theatre staple its own aural utopia.

— Kevin Fallon of The Atlantic on the "diva-off" between Mercedes and Rachel.

The performance of the duet "Take Me or Leave Me" elicited praise from Brown and Fallon, who both deemed it the highlight of the episode. Brown noted that "it had that addictive Glee quality of actually feeling like high school, and watching Mercedes and Rachel have a blast blasting each other was a treat." Gonzalez gave the duet a "B", as, while there was "so much to swoon for", she is more partial to ballads because they "discourage oversinging throughout the entire song". Futterman wrote that while Mercedes had more sass than Rachel, "both ladies sang". VanDerWerff did not see how the song was relevant, and felt that Michele's voice was ill-suited to it.

Flandez called Lauren's "I Know What Boys Like" the highlight of the episode, and VanDerWerff praised it as the best musical number. He complimented her confidence, but said the underwear joke was "unnecessary and overstated". In contrast, Gonzalez cited the underwear shots as a factor in raising her grade to a "C−" for a song without "basic musicality". Patrick Burns of The Atlantic was also unimpressed, and questioned Lauren's spot in glee club, as "her brazen character never ceases to please, but it's just not believable that she would join the glee club if she cannot sing." In December 2012, TV Guide named the cover one of Glee's worst performances.

On the New Directions collaboration with Sue on "Sing", Futterman wrote, "By turning down the rock and bringing in a choral element, the song actually came off as a great anthem for the bunch of misfits that is the New Directions. We kind of wish they had put on their choir robes instead and fully embraced the arrangement." Although Gonzalez gave the performance a "B", she called it "lacking" and not "regionals material": "We need to be blown away." TV Guide also listed this rendition as one of Glee's worst performances.

=== Chart history ===
Of the five cover versions released as singles—the cover of "This Little Light of Mine" was not released—four debuted on the Billboard Hot 100, and appeared on other musical charts. These same four songs were also featured on the sixth soundtrack album of the series, Glee: The Music, Volume 5. On the Hot 100, the show's rendition of "Baby" debuted at number forty-seven; it was at number fifty-two on the Billboard Canadian Hot 100. The Glee cover version of "Sing" debuted on the Hot 100 at number forty-nine, placing higher than the original by My Chemical Romance, which climbed from number ninety-two to number fifty-eight, its best showing to that point; in Canada, both versions debuted on the Canadian Hot 100 in the same week, with the Glee version at number thirty-seven, the highest of the four Glee singles there, while the original charted twenty slots below it at number fifty-seven. The other two songs on the Hot 100 were "Take Me or Leave Me" at number fifty-one, which also made number sixty on the Canadian Hot 100, and "Somebody to Love" at number sixty-two, which also made number fifty-three on the Canadian Hot 100. "I Know What Boys Like" did not chart.
