= Sexy (Glee) =

- Glee episode
- Episode no.: Season 2 Episode 15
- Directed by: Ryan Murphy
- Written by: Brad Falchuk
- Production code: 2ARC15
- Original air date: March 8, 2011
- Running time: 43 minutes

Guest appearances
- Gwyneth Paltrow as Holly Holliday; John Stamos as Dr. Carl Howell; Dot-Marie Jones as Shannon Beiste; Harry Shum, Jr. as Mike Chang; Chord Overstreet as Sam Evans; Darren Criss as Blaine Anderson; Ashley Fink as Lauren Zizes; Telly Leung as Wes

Episode chronology
← Previous "Blame It on the Alcohol"	Next → "Original Song"
- Glee season 2

"Sexy" is the fifteenth episode of the second season of the American musical comedy-drama television series Glee, and the thirty-seventh episode overall. It was written by Brad Falchuk, directed by Ryan Murphy, and first aired on the Fox network on March 8, 2011. The episode mainly revolves around the topics of sex and adolescent sexuality. In it, Holly Holliday (Gwyneth Paltrow) returns to McKinley High School as a substitute teacher in a class devoted to sex education. Glee club director Will Schuester (Matthew Morrison) begins to develop feelings for Holly, and guidance counselor and celibacy club advisor Emma Pillsbury (Jayma Mays) is less than pleased with Holly's lessons. Santana (Naya Rivera) expresses her love for Brittany (Heather Morris), and Burt Hummel (Mike O'Malley) has a talk with his son Kurt (Chris Colfer) about sex.

"Sexy" received generally positive reviews. Many critics praised Paltrow's performance, preferring it to her first appearance in "The Substitute", though they disagreed over how Paltrow was used. The storylines were well received, particularly the one involving Brittany and Santana: Emily VanDerWerff of The A.V. Club and Patrick Burns of The Atlantic deemed it the highlight of the episode. The scene featuring Burt having "the talk" with Kurt was also singled out for praise. This episode featured cover versions of five songs, including "Kiss" by Prince and "Landslide" by Fleetwood Mac. The latter song was very well received, though the musical performances and cover versions in the episode were mostly given a mixed reception by reviewers.

Upon its original airing, this episode was viewed by 11.92 million American viewers, and garnered a 4.6/14 Nielsen rating/share in the 18–49 demographic. The episode's total viewership and ratings increased significantly from the previous episode, "Blame It on the Alcohol".

== Plot ==
Substitute teacher Holly Holliday (Gwyneth Paltrow) returns to McKinley High to cover sex education classes, and tells Will Schuester (Matthew Morrison), director of the school glee club New Directions, that his club members are among the most ignorant about sex. He asks her to educate them using song, so Holly performs "Do You Wanna Touch Me (Oh Yeah)". Will later rehearses a rendition of "Kiss" with her, which culminates in a kiss, but Holly will not go further as she believes she would end up hurting him.

Sue Sylvester (Jane Lynch), director of rival glee club Aural Intensity, seeks out former New Directions member and current Dalton Academy Warbler Kurt Hummel (Chris Colfer) to tell him and his friend Blaine (Darren Criss), the Warblers' lead singer, that New Directions is planning a sexually provocative routine for the upcoming Regionals competition, having heard that the judges will be looking for same. Blaine responds by having the Warblers work up a "sexified" performance of "Animal", with Kurt joining him on lead, but Kurt's "sexy" faces and moves are anything but. Kurt insists on remaining ignorant of sexual matters, which Blaine feels is dangerous at their age, so he visits Kurt's father, Burt (Mike O'Malley), and prompts him to give Kurt "the talk" about sex.

At McKinley, glee club members Puck (Mark Salling) and Lauren (Ashley Fink) plan to make a sex tape, until Holly informs them that it would be considered child pornography. Puck, appalled, joins the celibacy club. The club's advisor Emma Pillsbury (Jayma Mays) thinks Holly's lessons are inappropriate, so she arranges for the club to perform a wholesome song for New Directions. She picks "Afternoon Delight", unaware that the song is about sex. Her husband Carl (John Stamos) approaches Holly afterward about counseling. During the counseling session, he reveals that Emma is still a virgin, and Emma admits that she may still have feelings for Will. Carl tells her he will be moving into a hotel until she is certain of her feelings.

Holly also counsels glee club members Santana (Naya Rivera) and Brittany (Heather Morris) when they express confusion about their sexuality. She joins them for a performance of "Landslide", after which Santana tearfully confesses to Brittany that she is in love with her and wants to be with her, but she is afraid of being bullied and ostracized for being in a same-sex relationship. Brittany reciprocates her love, but explains that she also loves her boyfriend Artie (Kevin McHale) and will not break up with him, to Santana's distress.

Lauren is annoyed with Puck for joining the celibacy club, but when he explains that he is trying to take responsibility for his actions, she kisses him and agrees to join too. Quinn (Dianna Agron) and Finn (Cory Monteith) are secretly back together. Holly's stint as a sex education instructor ends when parents complain about her classes. She tells Will that she wants to learn about romance; he offers to teach her, and they kiss.

== Production ==
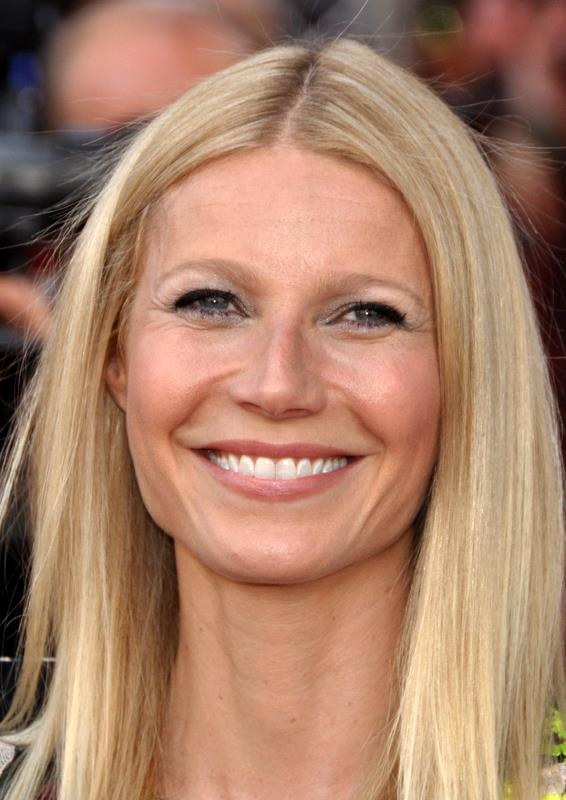
In "Sexy", Paltrow (pictured) reprised her role as substitute teacher Holly Holliday.

"Sexy" marked Paltrow's second guest appearance on Glee as substitute teacher Holly Holliday. She first appeared earlier in the second season, in the seventh episode, "The Substitute". The role was devised for her by series co-creator Ryan Murphy, who suggested that she showcase her vocal and dancing talent ahead of the release of the film Country Strong, in which Paltrow plays a country singer. Paltrow was signed to Glee for two episodes, with "The Substitute" originally intended to feature a love quadrangle between Holly, Will, Emma and Carl. Her initial arc was, however, reduced to a single episode. Post-broadcast, Murphy said they both hoped she would appear on Glee again in the future, depending on the right storyline. In January 2011, Paltrow confirmed that she would be reprising the role. Murphy stated that she would appear in episodes fifteen and sixteen as a sex education teacher, and would serve as a love interest for Will, though she actually appeared in episodes fifteen and seventeen. Stamos also reprised his role as Emma's husband Carl. As of March 2011, he was unsure whether he would return to Glee again, but stated that he might do so to conclude Emma and Carl's storyline, explaining: "I think people like me on there, but they really love Will and Emma together. So I don't know how much longer people can stand Will and Emma not being together."

The episode continued the romantic relationship between Brittany and Santana, first alluded to during the first season. The two kissed on-screen for the first time in the season two episode "Duets", after which their romance was little explored, leading to what Rivera described as an "uproar" by fans of the pairing in December 2010. The following month, executive producer Brad Falchuk revealed via the social networking website Twitter that further developments to the storyline had always been intended, with Paltrow's Holly serving as a catalyst.

In addition to Paltrow reprising her role as Holly Holliday, recurring characters who appear in the episode include Stamos as dentist Carl Howell, glee club members Lauren Zizes (Fink), Sam Evans (Chord Overstreet) and Mike Chang (Harry Shum, Jr.), football coach Shannon Beiste (Dot-Marie Jones) and Kurt's friend Blaine Anderson (Criss).

"Sexy" features cover versions of five songs, all of which were released as singles, available for download: "Do You Wanna Touch Me (Oh Yeah)" by Gary Glitter as recorded by Joan Jett, "Animal" by Neon Trees, "Kiss" by Prince, an acoustic version of "Landslide" by Fleetwood Mac, and "Afternoon Delight" by the Starland Vocal Band. Paltrow performs on "Do You Wanna Touch Me (Oh Yeah)", "Kiss" and "Landslide", all of which feature on the series' sixth soundtrack album, Glee: The Music, Volume 5. In the United Kingdom, "Do You Wanna Touch Me (Oh Yeah)" was omitted from Glee: The Music, Volume 5, and "Afternoon Delight", which features Stamos and Salling, was included instead. A cover of Rod Stewart's "Da Ya Think I'm Sexy?" sung by the Warblers was planned to be featured in the episode but did not appear; "Animal" was the Warblers number performed. Both tracks appear on the seventh soundtrack album, Glee: The Music Presents the Warblers. Neon Trees bassist Branden Campbell recounted how Criss approached the band at the 2011 Coachella Valley Music and Arts Festival to thank them for allowing "Animal" to be used, as Criss was the one who brought the song to Murphy's attention. Stevie Nicks of Fleetwood Mac, who wrote and originated "Landslide", visited the Glee set on the day the song was filmed.

== Reception ==
=== Ratings ===
"Sexy" was first broadcast on March 8, 2011 in the United States on Fox. It was watched by 11.92 million American viewers upon its initial airing, according to the Nielsen ratings. The episode attained a 4.6/14 Nielsen rating/share in the 18–49 demographic, and was the highest rated show of the night. The episode's total viewership and ratings/share increased significantly from the previous episode, "Blame It on the Alcohol", which received over 10.58 million viewers and garnered a 4.4/12 rating/share in the 18–49 demographic during its original airing two weeks earlier. Its Canadian broadcast was also on March 8, 2011, and "Sexy" received 1.81 million viewers and placed eleventh in the weekly program rankings. This was not quite as good an audience as for "Blame It on the Alcohol", which aired two weeks earlier and was watched by 1.89 million viewers, though it was an improvement on the show's weekly ranking from fourteenth place.

In Australia, "Sexy" was watched by 1.03 million viewers on March 14, 2011, which made Glee the eighth most-watched show of the night. This was a slight increase over the 1.02&million viewers who had watched "Blame It on the Alcohol" the week before, though it had been the sixth most-watched show that night. In the United Kingdom, the episode was broadcast on April 18, 2011, and watched by 2.58 million viewers (2.039 million on E4, and 541,000 on E4+1); it was the most-watched show on cable for the week. Viewership was up slightly from "Blame It on the Alcohol" the previous week, which had totaled 2.53 million viewers.

=== Critical reception ===
The episode received a positive response from reviewers. They disagreed over how well Paltrow was used, but generally praised the Brittany–Santana and Kurt–Burt storylines. The Atlantic's Kevin Fallon deemed "Sexy" an episode of mixed messages, one which treated the issues it raised with "an appropriate amount of levity", but failed to "play the nuances of the [celibacy vs. sex] argument as delicately as it probably thought it did." His Atlantic co-writer Patrick Burns criticized the series for glorifying a risqué subject, "then half-heartedly attempt[ing] to hammer home a moral." Meghan Brown, also writing for The Atlantic, called it a "solid episode with some strong character moments." Time's James Poniewozik felt that the episode "began clumsily, lacked subtlety, involved some embarrassing moments" and focused too much on Paltrow, but as it continued, "achieve[d] a few moments of delight and honest emotion". Anthony Benigno of The Faster Times described it as "incredibly comprehensive and enjoyable to boot", and IGN's Robert Canning said it "avoided preaching and teaching and instead just had some fun and let guest star Gwyneth Paltrow steal all the scenes". Erica Futterman of Rolling Stone wrote that "Glee continues its climb, delicately and successfully marrying actual sex lessons with camp and humor".

Several reviewers preferred Paltrow's return in "Sexy" to her first appearance in "The Substitute". The Washington Post's Emily Yahr felt that she was better integrated into this episode, and Raymund Flandez of The Wall Street Journal called her return "infinitely better" than her first appearance: "Back then, she was a puzzle, a loony bin. Here, she's sly and quick-witted, appropriately adult and seductively saucy in an episode that showcased more of her comedic timing, than her stiff dance skills. All the better for us." Fallon wrote that Paltrow was "if possible, even sassier and sultrier" than before, and felt that she served to anchor a busy episode. In contrast, Sandra Gonzalez of Entertainment Weekly had mixed feelings about Holly, as she believed that the character dominated screen time. The A.V. Club's Emily VanDerWerff liked Paltrow's acting, but disliked Holly's interaction with Will, and said they lacked chemistry. Soraya Roberts of the Daily News disliked her return for prolonging Will and Emma's separation, and commented that while Paltrow's appearance in "The Substitute" was "relatively fresh", in "Sexy" she was "acting almost like a cardboard cutout version of her former self, overly enunciating her lines [and] treading carefully around her choreography". Poniewozik found all of Paltrow's scenes "labored and ridiculous", and wrote that the actress failed to bring an element of realism to her character. Benigno wondered why Holly appeared to be "the perfect mentor to these sexually confused kids" given that in her previous appearance she was "very fun to be around but not well equipped at all to deal with serious issues". Canning said that "the moment she came on screen the whole episode lit up", and the episode was a "fun and funny showcase for everybody's favorite recurring character", and Futterman echoed him when she called Paltrow "our new favorite cast member".

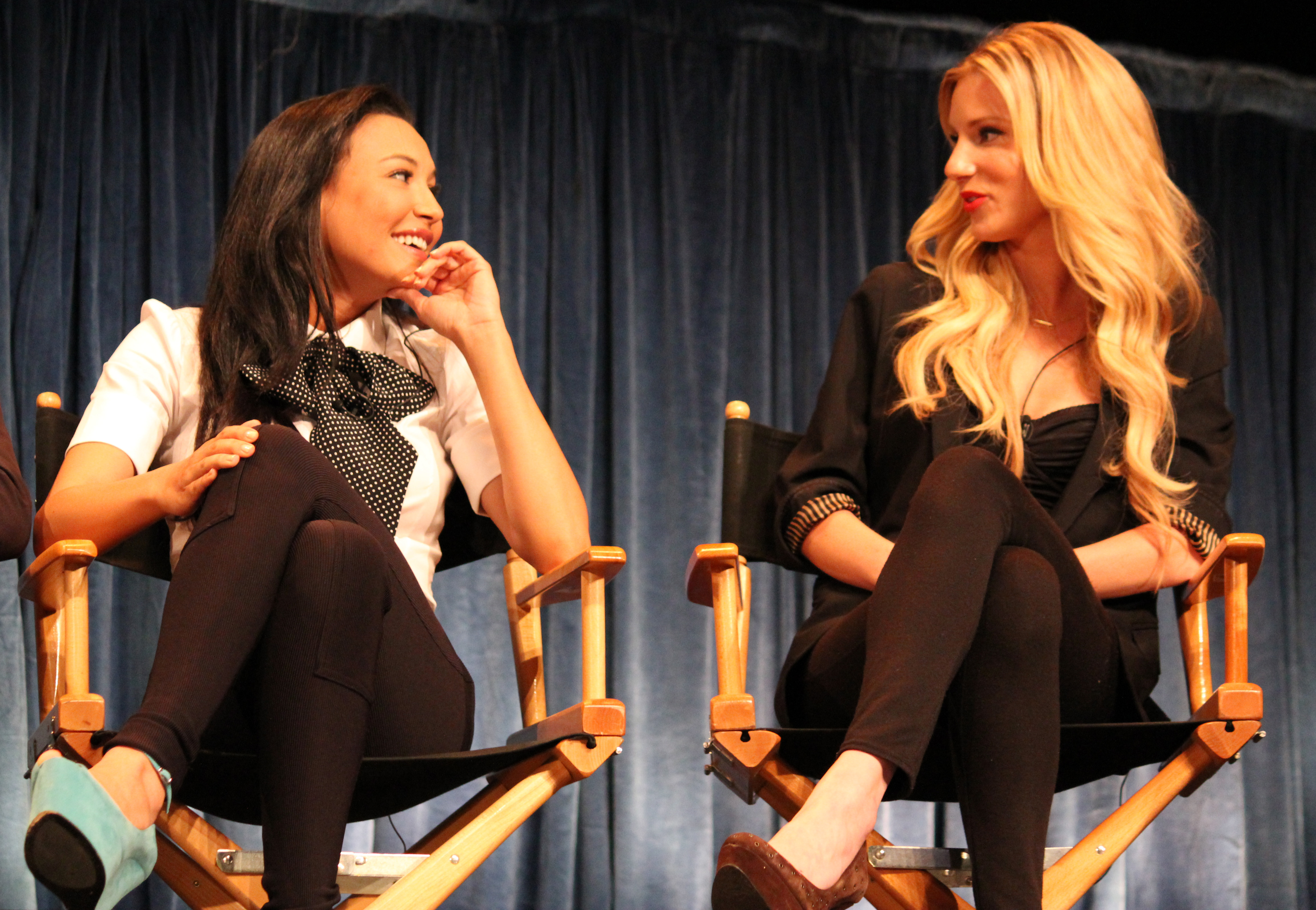
Both Naya Rivera (left) and Heather Morris (right) were praised for their acting in the episode

The storyline featuring Santana and Brittany was very well received, and the acting was also praised. Houston Chronicle's Bobby Hankinson wrote that Santana's "fear, her confusion and her journey were all rendered with honesty and even a subtlety rarely exhibited on this show." Gonzalez was somewhat surprised by the storyline and observed that Santana had not previously been portrayed as "so serious and vulnerable", but enjoyed the depth it brought to her character. She described Rivera as "heartbreakingly perfect", and Vanity Fair's Brett Berk wrote that "Naya Rivera and Heather Morris deserve special praise for the complex way they portray this fraught relationship." Poniewozik and VanDerWerff highlighted the work by the two actresses in the choir room scene when "Landslide" was being sung, and VanDerWerff described the scene where Santana confessed her feelings for Brittany as "one of the better scenes of the season", while Poniewozik was impressed that the episode found "pathos and heartbreak" in a coupling formerly treated humorously. Canning, however, felt that Santana's revelation "could have been built up better".

Although some reviewers, including Yahr and TVLine's Michael Slezak, were unenthusiastic about Blaine's visit to Burt to get him to have "the talk" with Kurt, there was widespread praise for the talk itself, which Jen Harper of BuddyTV described as the "best scene" of the episode. Fallon called it "one of the most uncomfortable father–son sex talks ever committed to television (and thus, really, one of the most realistic)", and his colleague Brown said it became "something lovely, open-hearted, and true". Gonzalez deemed it awkward to watch, yet wrote that the scene served to convince her she had "never loved a father-son pair" more. Poniewozik found it realistic and moving, and gave particular praise to O'Malley for portraying Burt's "determination and awkwardness in helping his son", as did Slezak: "his completely grounded performance helps anchor the show in reality".

Burns was incredulous that Emma and Carl had not yet consummated their four-month-old marriage, and criticized their going to a substitute teacher for relationship advice, something that Benigno also found stupid. Slezak and VanDerWerff disliked the episode's portrayal of Emma, since the recently seen "stronger, less neurotic, and altogether more appealing Emma", as Slezak put it, was inconsistent with her depiction here. One of the few positive comments was from Canning, who singled out Emma's ignorance of what an "afternoon delight" actually was. The reviewers were more enthusiastic about the pairing of Puck and Lauren, though somewhat divided. MTV's Emily Exton called them her "favorite couple of the evening" and cited "the ridiculous logic that they share". Canning called their scenes "a hoot", though Benigno said he was "still not buying" the relationship. A third couple, that of the resurrected pairing of Finn and Quinn, was in Harper's "didn't love" column, and VanDerWerff couldn't bring herself to care enough to comment on it.

=== Music and performances ===
Musical performances in the episode attracted a wide range of commentary, from enthusiastic to dismissive, though one song, "Landslide", received generally high marks. Brown wrote that all the performances "felt a little lackluster ... though none stood out as being particularly awful", while Hankinson maintained that the "songs were universally great".

Most reviewers agreed that the performance of "Do You Wanna Touch Me (Oh Yeah)" was sexy. Benigno was one of these and was entertained by the number, but he thought Holly's "vocals seem oddly subdued trying to imitate Joan Jett's voice" and gave it a "B" grade. Gonzalez gave the same grade and also took issue with the vocals, though she enjoyed the energy and Brittany's dancing. Rolling Stone's Erica Futterman had a different view of the singing, and said that "Holly can't quite muster Jett's vocal power". Berk gave the song four stars out of five and noted the "amazing hairography", but Roberts called the performance a "leather-clad, hair-whipping mess". Slezak gave the performance an "A"; he wrote that Paltrow "completely captured the track's naughty spirit, and Brittany took it over the top with her bump and grind atop the music-room piano".

The inclusion of "Do You Wanna Touch Me (Oh Yeah)" in an episode dealing with sex education and adolescent sexuality sparked some controversy, as its original performer and writer, Gary Glitter, is a registered sex offender in the United Kingdom. He has been convicted of several sexual crimes involving minors, including a conviction for possession of child pornography in the UK in 1997, and his conviction for child sexual abuse in Vietnam in 2006. Charities dedicated to serving and helping children have filed complaints to Fox and the producers of Glee. Television executives in the UK, where the episode was to be broadcast about a month later than in the US, were rumored to be considering the removal of the scene entirely. However, a spokesperson for Channel 4 stated that the episode would air in full, and explained: "The scene is editorially justified within the programme and we do not seek to censor material in the proper context." Claude Knights, the executive director of the London-based children's charity Kidscape, said, "It is regrettable that the producers did not consider the implication of using such a track in the context of a sex education class. The fact that this song is linked to Gary Glitter ... make[s] it wholly inappropriate". The UK edition of Glee: The Music, Volume 5 omits the track; "Afternoon Delight" is included instead.

Though "Afternoon Delight" was variously described as "goofy" by Benigno and "corny" by Gonzalez, it nevertheless was given a generally positive reception. Benigno called the performance "absolutely hilarious", but characterized the cover as "pretty impressive", and gave a grade of "A−". Amy Reiter of the Los Angeles Times was even more enthusiastic: she said it was an "incredible rendition" that she ranked "among the best moments of Glee ever". Slezak's grade of "B−" was issued after a strong caveat: "Arrested Development did it better", and Gonzalez wrote that Stamos was wasted on the performance, which she gave a "C". Berk cited the "incredible harmonies" when he gave the song four out of five stars.

"Animal" received a widely divergent mix of reviews. Harper wrote that the Warblers "did a good job with it but nothing special", while Hankinson called it "super adorable and fun" and that it "was great to finally see Kurt get to share the spotlight with Blaine". Flandez was not as pleased by Kurt—or by the Warblers, who he said had ruined the song—and likened his performance to "Jar Jar Binks on acid, with those jerky moves and infantile facial expressions". Roberts called their version "hokey", and Slezak said the setting "felt contrived as heck" and gave the song a "D". Benigno was at the other end of the scale with an "A" grade and the summary that "they completely crush it", while Gonzalez gave the number an "A+", deemed it "unforgettable", praised the "unique song selection" and called it "pure fun". Futterman described the Warblers as "the loosest they've been all season", but characterized the performance as one of their "least successful" because Blaine and Kurt, "two of the series' most reliable lead singers", were severely overprocessed electronically. Tyler Glenn, lead singer of Neon Trees, said, "I thought it was cool".

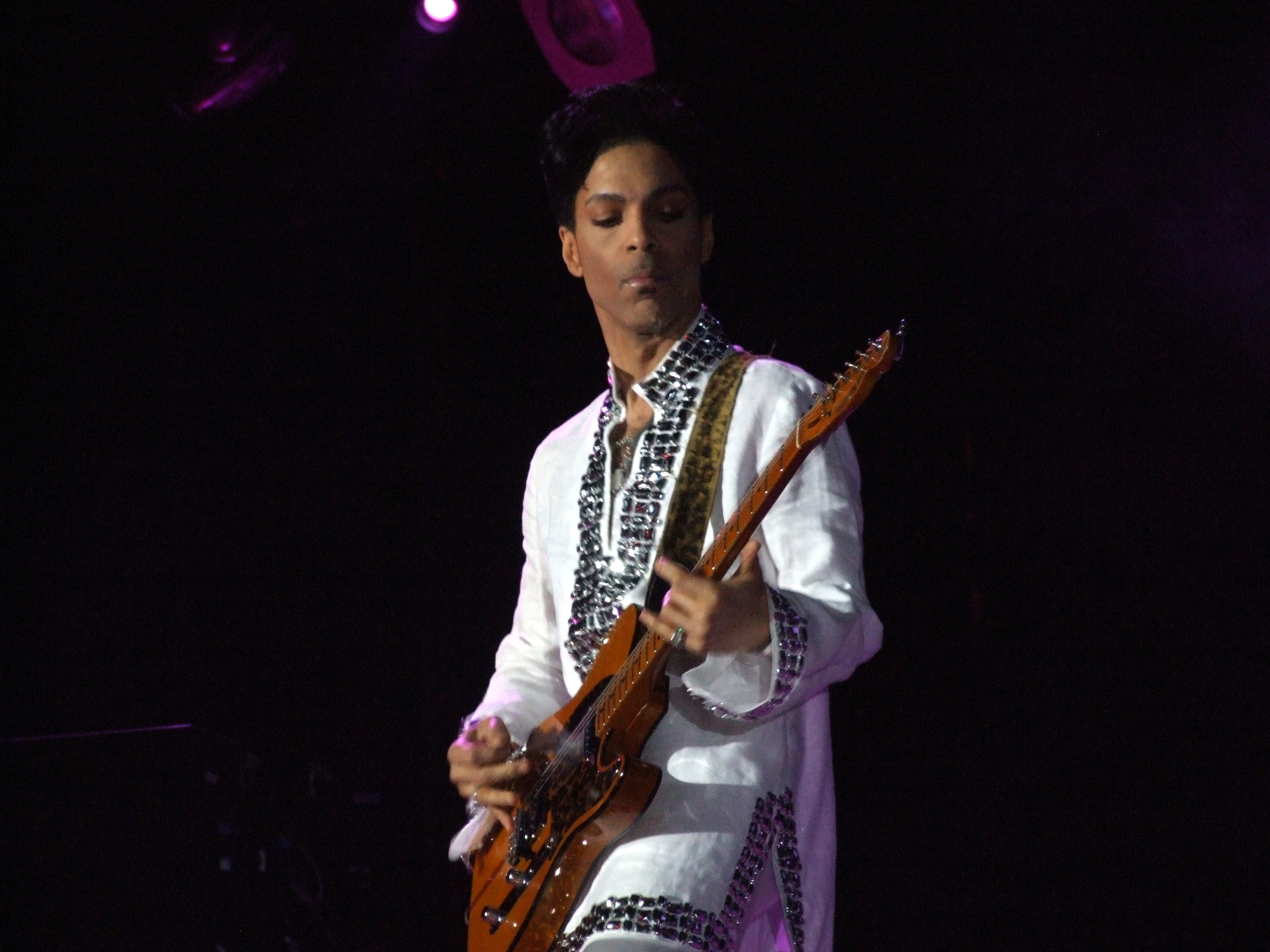
"Kiss" by Prince (pictured) was covered by Matthew Morrison and Gwyneth Paltrow

There was not much enthusiasm for the performance of "Kiss". Most reviewers were not impressed with Will's falsetto: Harper said it made her ears "sad" and Gonzalez said it "really didn't do it" for her, though she did like the sections in his natural register and gave the performance a "C+", and Harper noted that "Holly saved the song" for her. Although Futterman said Will "expertly hits the falsetto notes", she didn't "feel the chemistry" until the final kiss. Benigno, on the other hand, said that the chemistry between them was "palpable", called the cover "pretty great", and gave it a "B+". Roberts praised the "real sex appeal" Morrison brought to the number, but deemed Paltrow's tango rigid. Burns commented that white people ought to be deterred from performing Prince. He called the music "uninteresting and soulless", and was dismayed that the tango was "just white with white people tango dancing". Flandez, however, enjoyed their dancing and wrote, "The strong holds, the slow cuts, the perfect swivel of hips and the lean-to's were mesmerizingly seductive."

"Landslide" received the most praise of the songs in the episode; indeed, both VanDerWerff and Harper named it the episode's best number. Harper noted the "great harmonies" and added, "I got goose bumps." Hankinson called the rendition "gorgeous" and Berk used "perfection"; Berk went above his five star maximum to give the performance six stars. Roberts found the performance "pretty but uninspired", though Flandez called it "a dreamy, perfectly pitched power song of lesbian love" and Poniewozik "surprisingly poignant". Benigno and Slezak both noted that the cover was based on the version by the Dixie Chicks, and gave grades of "A−" and "B+" respectively. The "B+" from Gonzalez came with a caveat: she wished that Rivera, rather than Paltrow, had sung the lead vocal because of the meaning the song held for Santana. Stevie Nicks welcomed the cover of "Landslide", and hoped it would bring the Fleetwood Mac's songs to a new generation. She approved of the performance, and said that Paltrow "sang it beautifully".

=== Chart history ===
Of the five cover versions released as singles, four debuted on the Billboard Hot 100, and appeared on other musical charts. On the Hot 100, the show's rendition of "Landslide" debuted at number twenty-three; it was at number thirty-five on the Billboard Canadian Hot 100. The other three songs on the Hot 100 were "Do You Wanna Touch Me (Oh Yeah)" at number fifty-seven, which also made number sixty-three on the Canadian Hot 100, "Animal" at number sixty-two, which also made number sixty-five on the Canadian Hot 100, and "Kiss" at number eighty-three, which also made number eighty on the Canadian Hot 100. "Afternoon Delight" did not chart on either list.
