= Lake George (film) =

- Theatrical release poster
- Directed by: Jeffrey Reiner
- Written by: Jeffrey Reiner
- Produced by: Cleta Ellington; Jeffrey Reiner
- Starring: Shea Whigham; Carrie Coon; Max Casella
- Cinematography: Tod Campbell
- Edited by: Brian Beal
- Music by: Rene G. Boscio
- Production companies: Gray Fox Films; Lucky Buck Productions; WilHill Productions
- Distributed by: Magnet Releasing
- Release dates: June 9, 2024 (Tribeca Film Festival); December 6, 2024 (United States)
- Running time: 108 minutes
- Country: United States
- Language: English

Lake George is a 2024 American crime thriller film written and directed by Jeffrey Reiner. The film stars Shea Whigham and Carrie Coon as two people who go on a road trip to steal from an Armenian gangster.

== Synopsis ==
Fresh out of jail after serving a ten year stint, former insurance adjuster Don has found that there are few options open to him. None of his former associates are of any help, so Don decides to collect on a debt owed to him by an Armenian gangster named Armen. Fully aware that Don is in desperate need of cash, Armen tells him that he will pay Don back - but only if he kills Armen's girlfriend Phyllis. He reluctantly agrees, but when the time comes Don finds himself unable to pull the trigger. Phyllis then suggests that she and Don turn the tables on Armen and steal cash that he has stashed at various safe locations.

== Cast ==
- Shea Whigham as Don
- Carrie Coon as Phyllis
- Max Casella as Harout
- Ashley Fink as Nadja
- Glenn Fleshler as Armen
- Derek Phillips as Cory
- Troy Metcalf as Artie
- Joey Oglesby as Nick
- Keri Safran as Gloria

== Production ==
Reiner first came up with the concept for Lake George during the COVID-19 pandemic and has stated that he took inspiration from noir films such as Point Blank, Midnight Run, and The Asphalt Jungle. While Reiner did not create the character of Don specifically for Whigham, he did create the character with Whigham in mind, as he liked the actor's performance as Eli in Boardwalk Empire. Coon was brought on to portray Phyllis after Whigham gave her a copy of the script to review.

Filming for Lake George took place in California; Whigham stated that Reiner used his and his sister's house for filming. They also used Reiner's car.

== Release ==
Lake George premiered in New York City at the Tribeca Film Festival on June 9, 2024, followed by a streaming and limited theatrical release on December 6 of the same year. It was released in the United States on December 6, 2024.

== Reception ==
Critical reception for Lake George has been positive and as of January 2025 the film holds a rating of 96% "fresh" on Rotten Tomatoes, based on 25 reviews. Metacritic, which uses a weighted average, assigned the film a score of 71 out of 100, based on 6 critics, indicating "generally favorable" reviews.

Common praise for the film centered upon the chemistry and interactions between Whigham and Coon. Dennis Harvey of Variety noted that the film "comes off less as a thriller than a rueful black comedy of errors, with even the most violent characters carrying a certain pathos." The film also received praise from Dread Central for a scene where the two leads must stage a photo providing proof of Phyllis's death, stating that it was "a humorous sequence where the grandiose nature of one’s schemes clashes with the messy logistics of implementation".
