= Silly Love Songs (Glee) =

- Glee episode
- Episode no.: Season 2 Episode 12
- Directed by: Tate Donovan
- Written by: Ryan Murphy
- Production code: 2ARC12
- Original air date: February 8, 2011

Guest appearances
- Dot-Marie Jones as Shannon Beiste; Harry Shum, Jr. as Mike Chang; Chord Overstreet as Sam Evans; Darren Criss as Blaine Anderson; Ashley Fink as Lauren Zizes; Alexander Nifong as Jeremiah; Telly Leung as Wes

Episode chronology
← Previous "The Sue Sylvester Shuffle"	Next → "Comeback"
- Glee season 2

"Silly Love Songs" is the twelfth episode of the second season of the American musical television series Glee, and the thirty-fourth overall. The Valentine's Day-themed episode was written by series creator Ryan Murphy, directed by Tate Donovan, and premiered on Fox on February 8, 2011. In this episode, Director Will Schuester (Matthew Morrison) assigns the McKinley High School glee club to perform love songs in honor of Valentine's Day. Club member Finn Hudson (Cory Monteith) sets up a kissing booth for the occasion, to take advantage of his rising popularity and raise money for the club. At the Dalton Academy, Blaine Anderson (Darren Criss) and the Dalton Academy Warblers make plans to perform a musical number outside of the campus, and Kurt Hummel (Chris Colfer) confesses his love for Blaine.

"Silly Love Songs" was met with critical acclaim, with much of the praise stemming from the character development and the musical performances. Melissa Maerz of the Los Angeles Times, Emily VanDerWerff of The A.V. Club, and Lisa de Moraes of The Washington Post all deemed the storyline as entertaining, while Joel Keller of the TV Squad went on to call the episode "the best episode of the season." The episode features cover versions of six songs, including a cover of "P.Y.T." by Michael Jackson and "My Funny Valentine" from the musical Babes in Arms. Many of the covers and performances were met with positive reception from critics and fans alike, with much of the praise going to the Glee covers of "Fat Bottomed Girls" by Queen and "Silly Love Songs" by Paul McCartney, respectively. All songs with the exception of "My Funny Valentine" were released as singles and made available for digital download.

Upon its initial airing, the episode was watched by just under 11.58 million American viewers, and it garnered a 4.6/13 Nielsen rating/share in the 18–49 demographic. Both the total viewership and ratings were significantly down from the previous episode, "The Sue Sylvester Shuffle", which aired immediately after the Super Bowl.

== Plot ==
Glee club director Will Schuester (Matthew Morrison) gives New Directions a love song assignment. Having fallen for the group's newest member Lauren Zizes (Ashley Fink), Puck (Mark Salling) serenades her with Queen's "Fat Bottomed Girls". Lauren finds his song choice insulting and stands him up on a pre-Valentine's date, but eventually agrees to spend Valentine's Day with him as friends.

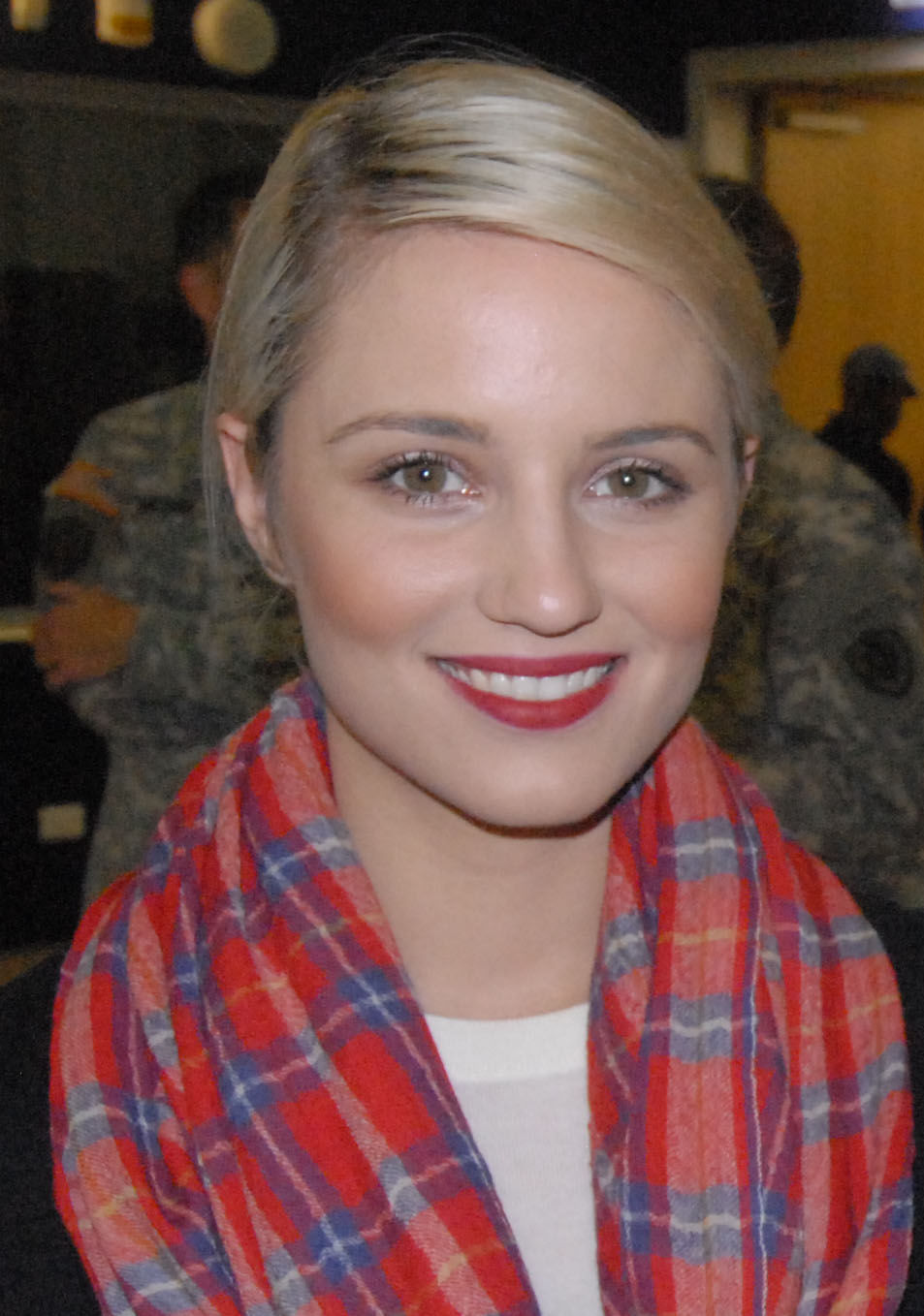
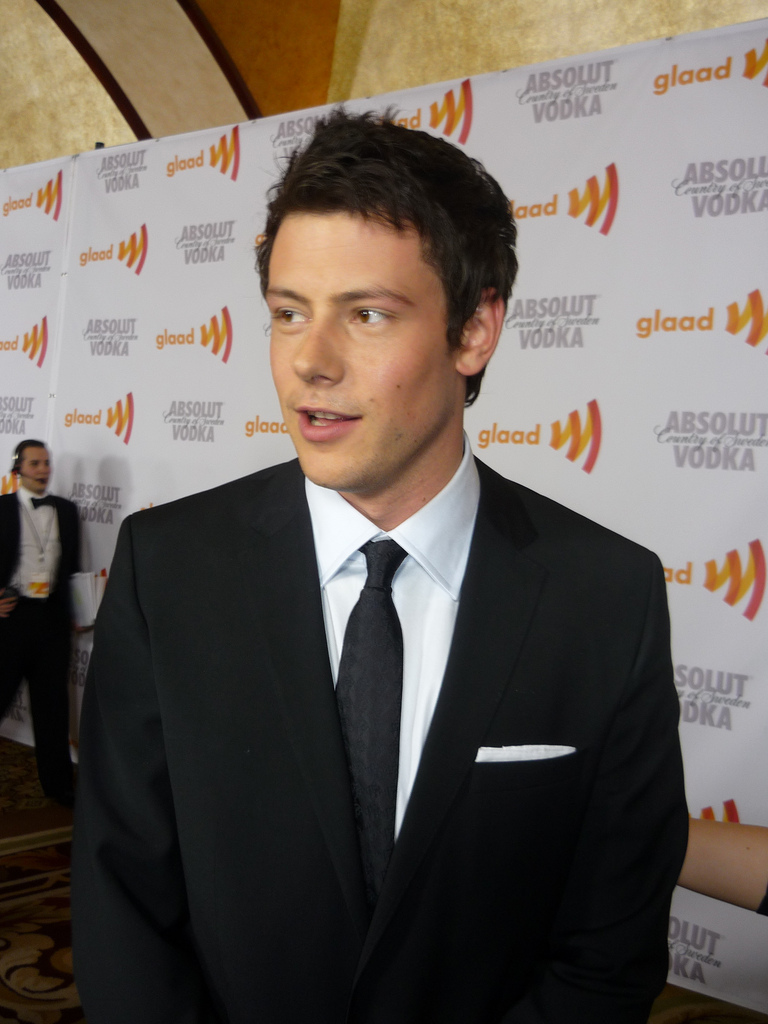
The past relationship between Quinn (Agron, left) and Finn (Monteith, right) is revisited in this episode.

Artie Abrams (Kevin McHale) and Mike Chang (Harry Shum Jr.) celebrate their respective relationships by performing Michael Jackson's "P.Y.T. (Pretty Young Thing)" for their girlfriends, Brittany Pierce (Heather Morris) and Tina Cohen-Chang (Jenna Ushkowitz). Tina later begins to sing "My Funny Valentine" to Mike, but is too overcome with emotion, and begins to cry while continuing to sing.

Finn Hudson (Cory Monteith) sets up a kissing booth, to take advantage of his popularity in the hope of kissing his ex-girlfriend Quinn Fabray (Dianna Agron). He also wants to donate the proceeds to the glee club. Quinn initially refuses to buy a kiss from Finn, but does so at the insistence of her boyfriend Sam Evans (Chord Overstreet), who is suspicious of their relationship. The kiss further re-ignites Finn and Quinn's feelings for one another, and they begin an affair. Santana Lopez (Naya Rivera), angry for having recently had her bad behavior highlighted by the other club members, conspires to give them mono and reveal Quinn's infidelity. Finn's most recent ex-girlfriend Rachel Berry (Lea Michele) is dismayed by his renewed feelings for Quinn, but resolves to concentrate on her career instead of romance, and leads the female New Directions members in a performance of Katy Perry's "Firework".

At Dalton Academy, a private school attended by former New Directions member Kurt Hummel (Chris Colfer), the object of his affection Blaine Anderson (Darren Criss) announces his intention to sing a love song to his crush. Kurt believes that Blaine has feelings for him, so is disappointed when his crush turns out to be Jeremiah (Alexander Nifong), the assistant manager at a local Gap store. The Dalton Academy Warblers accompany Blaine as he serenades Jeremiah with Robin Thicke's "When I Get You Alone". Jeremiah is subsequently fired and rebuffs Blaine. Kurt confesses his feelings to Blaine, who tells Kurt that he cares for him but is terrible at romance, and does not want to risk damaging their friendship. The episode ends with New Directions assembled at Breadstix, a local restaurant, where the Warblers perform the titular "Silly Love Songs".

== Production ==
"Silly Love Songs" was first announced by Glee co-creator Ryan Murphy in an interview with a German journalist. The name of the episode and its airdate were announced shortly after the announcement of the show getting a short-term hiatus due to various cast members contracting the flu. Inspiration for the episode may be partially related to a lobbying effort by Paul McCartney to have covers of songs by The Beatles incorporated into Glee. In an interview with various reporters at the 2010 Teen Choice Awards, Murphy revealed that he received a mixtape that was sent from McCartney, who is reportedly a fan of the series. Recurring characters who appear in this episode include glee club members Mike Chang (Harry Shum, Jr.), Sam Evans (Chord Overstreet), and Lauren Zizes (Ashley Fink), football coach Shannon Beiste (Dot-Marie Jones), and Blaine Anderson (Darren Criss) the lead singer of the Dalton Academy Warblers.

"Silly Love Songs" features cover versions of six songs: Katy Perry's "Firework", Queen's "Fat Bottomed Girls", Michael Jackson's "P.Y.T. (Pretty Young Thing)", "My Funny Valentine" from the musical Babes in Arms, "When I Get You Alone" by Robin Thicke, and "Silly Love Songs" by Paul McCartney and his band Wings. This was the fourth time a song by Katy Perry was used in a Glee episode, with the previous covers being "I Kissed a Girl" in the pilot, "Teenage Dream" on the episode "Never Been Kissed" and "California Gurls" on the previous episode "The Sue Sylvester Shuffle". All songs with the exception of "My Funny Valentine" were released as singles and made available for digital download. All five singles were included on Glee soundtrack albums: "Firework", "P.Y.T. (Pretty Young Thing)", and "Fat Bottomed Girls" were featured in the sixth soundtrack album, Glee: The Music, Volume 5, while "Silly Love Songs" and "When I Get You Alone" were featured on the seventh, Glee: The Music Presents the Warblers.

== Reception ==
=== Ratings ===
"Silly Love Songs" was originally broadcast in the United States on Fox on February 8, 2011. It received just under 11.58 million American viewers upon its initial airing, despite airing simultaneously with NCIS on CBS, The Biggest Loser on NBC, No Ordinary Family on ABC, and One Tree Hill on The CW. It garnered a 4.6/13 Nielsen rating/share in the 18–49 demographic, the highest rating of the night. This episode's total viewership and ratings were significantly down from the previous episode, "The Sue Sylvester Shuffle", which was watched by over 26.8 million American viewers and received an 11.1/29 rating/share in the 18–49 demographic.

In Canada, where it also aired on February 8, 2011, the episode was watched by over 2.08 million viewers. It ranked number ten in the most-watched television programs of the week. The total viewership slightly declined from the previous episode, which attained 2.16 million viewers, as well as being the ninth most-watched television program of the week. In Australia, where the episode aired on February 21, 2011, it was viewed by 921,000 viewers upon its initial airing. It was the eleventh most-watched program on the night. The episode's total viewership declined at a marginal rate from the previous episode, which drew 1.13 million viewers, and was the fourth most-watched program of the night and the most-watched in the 18–49 demographic. It placed tenth in the weekly viewership rankings. In the UK, the episode was watched by 2.629 million viewers (2.233 million on E4, and 396,000 on E4+1), becoming the most-watched show on E4 and E4 +1 for the week, and the most-watched show on cable for the week.

=== Critical response ===
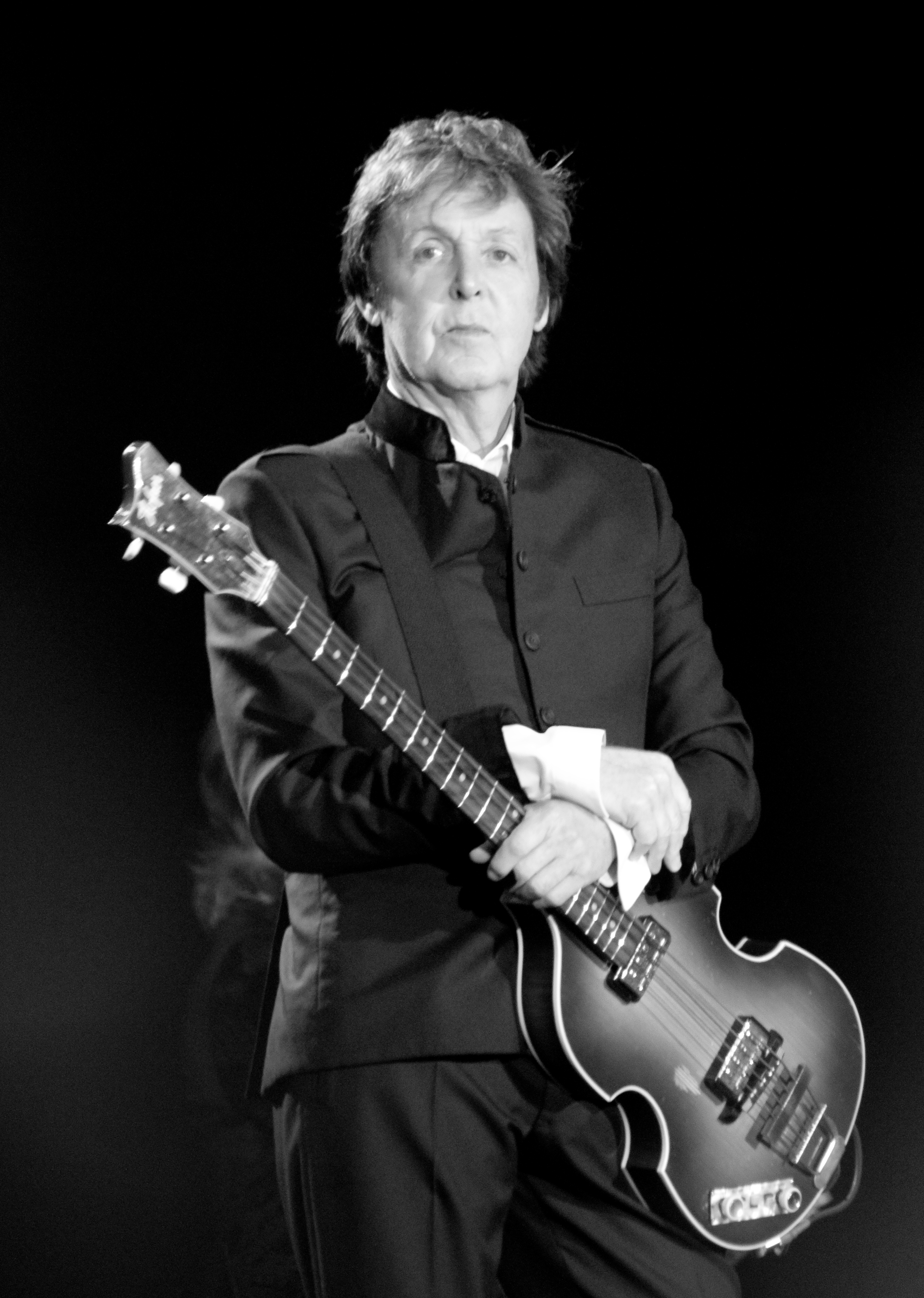
The cover version for "Silly Love Songs" by Paul McCartney (pictured) was met with general acclaim.

"Silly Love Songs" was met with critical acclaim from many television critics upon its initial airing. Erica Futterman of Rolling Stone gave a very positive review of the episode, and wrote, "This was our favorite type of Glee episode. Though we enjoy over-the-top spectacles [...], the show's real cleverness shines when they take songs from across the board and fit them into a cohesive storyline. Sue Sylvester didn't make an appearance and—dare we say it—we didn't even miss her." Bobby Hankinson of the Houston Chronicle enjoyed the episode, going on to write, "I thought it was a strong showing, if a little disjointed. Well, at least it was honest. If this show is one thing, it's disjointed. It's part of its spazzy appeal." Melissa Maerz of the Los Angeles Times gave the episode a positive review: "On Tuesday night, Glee wasn’t only back at its usual time, it was back to doing what it does best: giving us entertaining [...] storylines involving characters we care about who sing songs that emerge organically and advance the story. It was like a perfect heart-shaped bubble of an episode reminding the show’s fans about all the things we’ve missed about the show these last couple of months."

Robert Canning of IGN also gave the episode a positive review, and opined, "With the dissing of glee club temporarily put on hold, Glee the series was able to have a little fun with Tuesday night's episode. And fun it was, with the gang of New Directions taking on Valentine's Day, with flirting, kissing and, of course, singing. Without the bullying, this was a much lighter episode of Glee, and the results gave way to a lot more laughs and story development." He went on to praise Ashley Fink's performance as Lauren Zizes, and said of Puck's falling in love with Lauren, "I can't decide if I want to root for this couple, but I certainly know I'm going to be rooting for Lauren." Canning ultimately gave the episode an 8.5 out of 10. Wyndham Wyeth of Paste went on to praise the episode for its depiction of relationships in high school, as well as the backing vocals for Salling's performance of "Fat Bottomed Girls" by Queen. Emily VanDerWerff of The A.V. Club gave the episode a positive review and a grade of "A−": "'Silly Love Songs' is a fine example of the show at what's very nearly its absolute best. There's nothing too heady here, but if the show has one tone that it's nailed almost completely consistently, it's the feeling of teenage romance, the sense that the person you're in love with is the only person you will ever be in love with [...] followed almost immediately by the crippling feeling of heartbreak, of losing that person too soon. Teenage life moves fast and is filled with heightened emotions. And like most musicals, Glee has always been at its best when it embraces those two sides of its characters' lives. As such, 'Silly Love Songs', which is pretty much just an excuse to play around with the show's many romantic pairings among its glee club characters, is a lot of fun without trying all that hard." In conclusion of her review, she wrote, "The best episodes play that elation and devastation off of each other. The worst episodes flounder about for some sort of emotional foothold. But when Glee just tells small, sweet stories about these kids and the ways they're trying to cope with being in high school when they know they're meant for bigger things, it can be terrific. Tonight was one of those episodes, and tonight's episode was terrific. Here's to a good February sweeps."

"See, now that's the Glee I would have liked to share with that Super Bowl–sized sample of America Sunday night. I can see why the producers went with the kind of episode they did. The story didn't require more than the most general knowledge of the series and its serial plots. It involved football. And it spotlighted a couple of the show's most publicized, accessible draws: Sue and songs. But what we saw in 'Silly Love Songs' to me is what makes the show special. Music, yes, and some far-fetched story twists. But all of it—or most of it—rooted in things that, with some dramatic license, a group of kids in a small Ohio town with a mall would do."

— James Poniewozik of Time, on reviewing "Silly Love Songs"

Matt Richenthal of TV Fanatic gave the episode a 4.6 out of 5 stars, and went on to describe the episode as "A funny, touching, entertaining Glee episode that didn't feature a single line from Sue Sylvester? I never thought I'd see the day. But that's exactly what transpired on 'Silly Love Songs', as the show stopped feeling like a Public Service Announcement for a week and actually focused on well-paced, well-written relationship developments among its core characters." Joel Keller of TV Squad gave the episode a positive review, and wrote, "'Silly Love Songs' strikes an interesting contrast to Sunday night's post-Super Bowl episode in that tonight was more about the kids and where they are in their stories than about big production numbers and Sue's cartoon evilness. It was also the funniest episode of the season, in no small part because we got some insight into the lives of two New Directions members we rarely get to hang out with for any length of time: Santana and Lauren." James Poniewozik of Time Magazine praised the storyline and the musical performances of the episode. However, Soraya Roberts of the Daily News gave the episode a negative review: "This show sometimes sounds like it was written by a PIT, prime idiot TV writer. It's almost as bad as Tina breaking down into tears for no reason while singing 'My Funny Valentine' to Mike and Blaine attempting to channel Frank Sinatra while singing Paul McCartney's 'Silly Love Songs' in the middle of Breadsticks." Lisa de Moraes of The Washington Post praised the storyline, calling it cohesive.

=== Musical performances ===
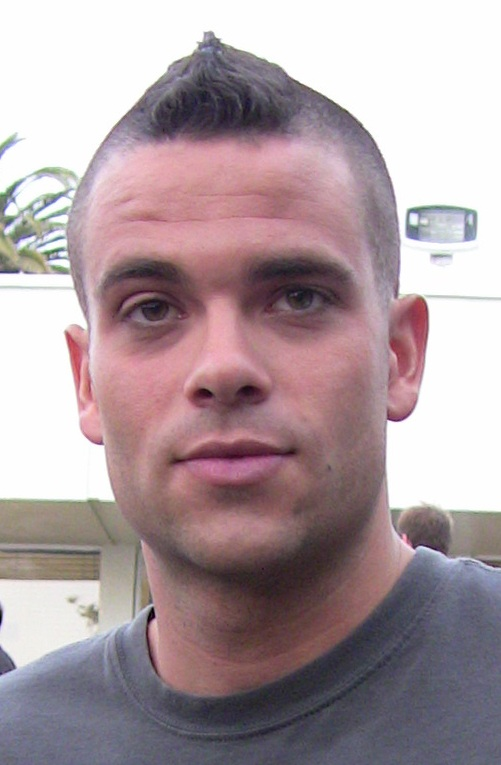
Critics reacted positively to Puck's (Mark Salling, pictured) rendition of "Fat Bottomed Girls".

The musical covers and performances for the episode were mostly well received by critics and fans alike. Sandra Gonzalez of Entertainment Weekly stated that her favorite was "Silly Love Songs" by Paul McCartney, performed by the Warblers. In a review of the performance, she wrote, "This is much more Warbler-esque than 'When I Get You Alone'. I had also been worried we wouldn't get our weekly dose of dorky Warbler dance moves. Plus, major points for the blink-and-you'll-miss-it moment when Blaine sang the love 'won't come at all' line to Santana. It was probably my personal biggest laugh-out-loud moment of the episode." She gave the performance an "A". She also praised Puck's performance of "Fat Bottomed Girls", and opined, "In general, I'm in love with Mark Salling's voice. He's right up there with Artie [...] in my book. And this song was smothered in awesome sauce. Bonus points for Puck's sort-of-feminine head bob, Brittany's background groovin', the club's reactions to him singing to Lauren, and Mr. Schu's mild eye-roll." She went on to give the performance an "A−". Kristin Coachman of the Seattle Post-Intelligencer was a bit more critical of Puck's cover of the song: "This week Mark Salling [...] is singing Queen's 'Fat Bottomed Girls'. I know this song fits in with Puck's storyline for the episode, but I feel like the song was in the wrong key for him. At times it sounded like he was straining to hit the higher notes. Because of this, I have to wonder if the backing vocals are purposely drowning his voice out. It seems depending on the song selection for him, Salling's vocal performances continue to be very hit or miss this season."

Tina's cover of "My Funny Valentine" stirred mixed emotions in Gonzalez. She criticized the ending: "When she started sobbing, it got weird. Then weirder. Then downright uncomfortable." However, she liked the earlier part of the performance, and wrote, "It was übersweet when Tina started getting choked up during her song, because let's face it, it happens. You can love someone so much it hurts. If she would have continued the song with a mild lump in her throat, I think I might have gotten choked up with her."

Rachel's cover of "Firework" by Katy Perry was reviewed negatively by Coachman. She wrote, "I'm not loving Michele’s vocals on this track. It was like they wanted to purposely make her sound like Katy Perry. As much as I really like Katy Perry, Michele has more of a tremendous voice. There are parts where I thought she sounded really great, but for the most part this song just wasn't my cup of tea. Michele has such a beautiful voice; I wish she was given songs that would allow her to showcase it to her advantage." Katie Morgan of Billboard gave a positive review of the Warblers' performance of "Silly Love Songs", writing, "Not only do they sound great [...], but the song brings a sugary sweet end to a super-saccharine episode." The Marquee Blog at CNN gave the music numbers a positive review. A notable segment reads: "I just loved seeing The Warblers get their groove on amidst the jeans and cotton T-shirts. And Kurt was super gracious trying to be supportive of Blaine, in spite of his own feelings. I also totally loved the music [...] and overall this was one of my favorite episodes this season. Brett Berk of Vanity Fair praised Salling's performance of "Fat Bottomed Girls", as well as the casts' performances of "P.Y.T." by Michael Jackson and "When I get You Alone" by Robin Thicke. Erica Futterman of Rolling Stone gave Salling's performance a positive review. She wrote, "We were thoroughly entertained by Puck's attempt to win newbie Lauren Zizes over with his tribute to her larger figure. Only in Puck's world would Queen's raucous song qualify as a serenade—and our horror-turned-amusement was mirrored on his fellow New Directions' faces. Puck is no Freddie Mercury, but he handles the melody well and makes up for lack of range with swagger."

=== Chart history ===
All five of the cover versions released as singles debuted on the Billboard Hot 100, and appeared on other musical charts. With these new Hot 100 debuts, plus the debut the same week of "She's Not There" from the prior episode "The Sue Sylvester Shuffle", which had aired two days before "Silly Love Songs", the Glee Cast passed Elvis Presley's record of 108 singles on the Hot 100, reaching 113 singles. The cast had nine songs on the Hot 100 that week, a new record for them. The show's rendition of "Firework" debuted at number thirty-four; it was at number thirty-five on the Billboard Canadian Hot 100. The other four songs from this episode on the Hot 100 were "Silly Love Songs" at number forty-five, which also made number fifty-four on the Canadian Hot 100, "When I Get You Alone" at number forty-seven, which also made number sixty-one on the Canadian Hot 100, "Fat Bottomed Girls" at number fifty-six, which also made number fifty on the Canadian Hot 100, and "P.Y.T. (Pretty Young Thing)" at number fifty-eight, which also made number sixty-nine on the Canadian Hot 100.
