= Lauren Zizes =

Fictional character from the Fox series Glee

- Glee character
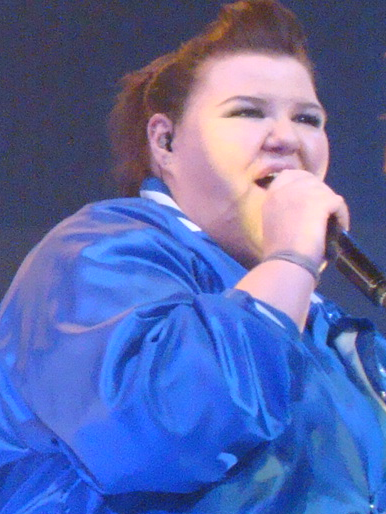
- Ashley Fink as Lauren on the Glee Live! In Concert! tour
- First appearance: "Wheels" (2009)
- Last appearance: "Dreams Come True" (2015)
- Created by: Ryan Murphy; Brad Falchuk; Ian Brennan
- Portrayed by: Ashley Fink

In-universe information
- Occupation: High school student
- Significant other: Noah "Puck" Puckerman

Lauren Zizes /ˈzaɪsiːz/ is a recurring fictional character from the Fox musical comedy-drama series, Glee. The character is portrayed by actress Ashley Fink, and first appeared in the season one episode "Wheels", first broadcast on November 11, 2009. Lauren was developed by Glee creators Ryan Murphy, Brad Falchuk, and Ian Brennan. She is a member of New Directions, the glee club at the fictional William McKinley High School in Lima, Ohio, where the show is set. Her storylines see her interact with other members of the glee club and form a relationship with Noah Puckerman (Mark Salling). Lauren is also the president of the AV club, and a member of the school's wrestling team. She joins the glee club in the show's second season, putting her in close contact with some of the show's main characters.

Following the character's significantly expanded role in the second season, Fink's portrayal received predominantly positive reviews. Rosie O'Donnell criticized the character, saying that Fink was unattractive and therefore a bad representation of fat people, but later apologized for these remarks. Lauren made her solo musical debut in the second season, performing The Waitresses' "I Know What Boys Like" in the episode "Comeback". The song was well received by critics, and was released as a single, available for download; it was subsequently included on the EP released in September 2011 through the Target chain, Glee: The Music, Dance Party. Although Lauren also appears in ensemble musical performances, Fink is not credited as a vocalist on the series' soundtrack albums. Lauren's role was reduced in the beginning of the third season, and she made a final, non-speaking appearance in the third episode, "Asian F". After this, it was confirmed she would appear once again in Glee and doing so in the fourth season's episode "Sadie Hawkins", which premiered on January 24, 2013. After this, she made numerous appearances in flashbacks before appearing one final time in the series finale, "Dreams Come True", during the performance of OneRepublic's "I Lived" by the glee club's alumni.

== Storylines ==
Throughout the first season of Glee, Lauren makes numerous guest appearances. She is a member of the McKinley High wrestling team, as well as president of the AV club. She first appears in the episode "Wheels", where she unsuccessfully tries out for a spot on the cheerleading team. She reappears in "Hell-O", when cheerleading coach Sue Sylvester assembles a group of unpopular, lonely students, whom she dubs the "Old Maid's Club". Lauren later helps glee club co-captain Rachel Berry (Lea Michele) to rig hidden microphones in the choir room to prove that the rest of the glee club are not pulling their weight in rehearsals. She is later seen as the leader of a group of goths who idolize Twilight character Edward Cullen.

Lauren's role becomes more prominent in the second season. Glee club member Puck (Mark Salling) asks her to join New Directions so they will have enough members to qualify for a show choir competition. Lauren accepts, on the condition that she gets seven minutes in heaven with him, though it is later revealed that she became bored with Puck's kissing style after three minutes. In the Valentine's Day-themed episode "Silly Love Song", Puck reveals that he has fallen in love with Lauren, and serenades her with Queen's "Fat Bottomed Girls". She finds his song choice insulting and stands him up on a pre-Valentine's date, but eventually agrees to spend Valentine's Day with him as friends. Lauren makes her solo debut in the following episode, where she performs a rendition of "I Know What Boys Like." Puck helps her, by advising her to picture the other members in their underwear, which she does in her timid-turned-confident performance. In the episode, "Sexy", Lauren enlists Puck to make a sex tape with her, as she believes the publicity will make her a star, but they give up the idea when they learn it would constitute child pornography, as both are underage.

In "Born This Way", Lauren reveals to Puck that she'd been a child beauty queen, "Miss Tiara Toddler", before she gained weight and became ineligible; Puck tells her he will run a campaign for her to become prom queen, and be her king. When Quinn, who is prom queen frontrunner, sees Lauren putting up posters for her own candidacy, she confronts Lauren, and the ensuing encounter is heated. Lauren decides to dig up dirt on Quinn as a campaign tactic, and aided by Puck, discovers that Quinn used to be overweight and unpopular before slimming down and transferring to McKinley; Lauren then plasters the school with pictures of the old Quinn, humiliating her. But the tactic backfires, making Quinn more popular, and hurting Lauren's candidacy. Lauren apologizes to Quinn, Quinn says she respects Lauren, and the two reach an understanding. Neither Lauren nor Puck win the race for prom queen and king, but they remain a couple; they fly with the rest of New Directions to the nationals competition in New York City, where the glee club comes in twelfth out of fifty teams. This defeat leads Lauren to quit the glee club at the beginning of the third season and break up with Puck.

== Development ==
=== Casting and creation ===
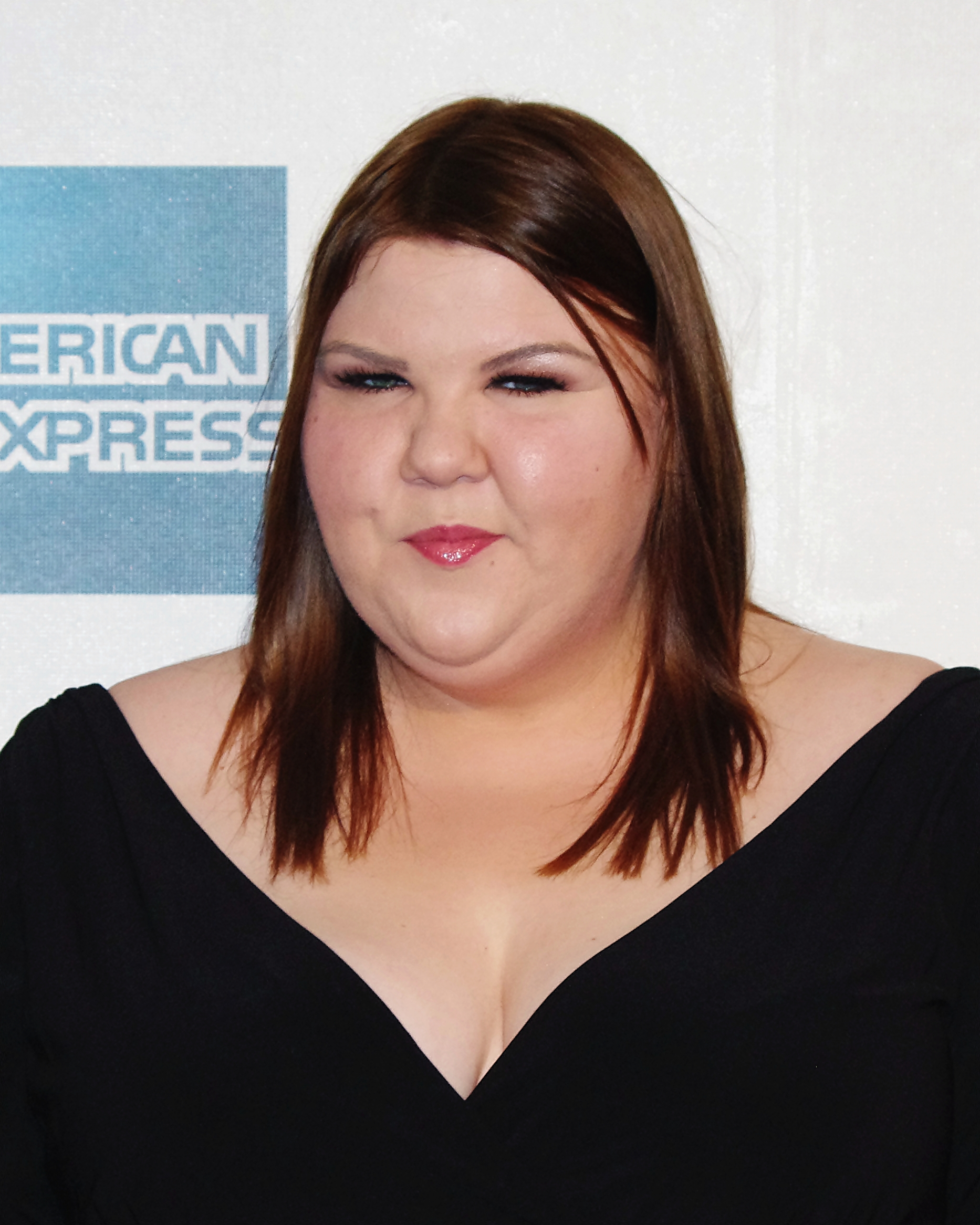
Ashley Fink was cast as Lauren Zizes

Lauren is portrayed by actress Ashley Fink. She made routine guest appearances throughout the first season, and became a member of the McKinley High glee club in the episode "Special Education". Upon receiving the script in which Lauren joins the club, Fink initially reacted with disbelief. She commented, "I didn't quite believe it at first, I thought I was getting Punk'd." She said that being cast in Glee makes her feel like "the luckiest girl in the world". Fink's favorite element of Glee is how series creator Ryan Murphy manages to take the underdogs and make them shine. She said, "In life, there's so much diversity, and it's not necessarily represented on television. I think Glee is one of the few shows that actually displays the diversity and it's just so inspirational." When asked about her casting process, Fink said:

I auditioned for the pilot and they brought me in a bunch, which was exciting for me because they kept bringing me in. Eventually I got the Lauren Zizes part! They had me sing for the pilot and it was very on the fly because Glee works very quickly. The first episode I appeared in I was the wrestler and I was trying out for cheerleading. Then they asked me to come out and sing for Ryan Murphy and the director and I sang and they were like, "Okay, great!" We shot it and then I just kept coming back.

Fink does not know how long her character will be featured on Glee. When asked about what she likes about her character, Fink said: "I think what I love about Lauren is she's so strong and so confident and she knows what she wants and I feel very blessed to play a role model for people who have ever felt other or different. I remember how I used to feel watching TV and seeing Sara Rue on Popular because she was an inspiration to me. It's funny because what I love about Lauren is that she's unapologetic and she's confident and she's making Puck work for it and she's not just looking for a roll in the hay. I think that they are very sweet together, there is this vulnerability when they are both such bad asses and you put them together and I think there is something really special there. What I appreciate about Lauren is that she's like I don't need to give it to you, you're going to work for it, and I think that's a great message to send to young girls. I think that he is smitten and she is probably a little smitten too but I think she has enough self esteem not to give everything up for the charming cute boy that's kind of after her." Kevin Fallon, a writer for The Atlantic, reacted favorably to the casting of Fink: "Glee hit the trifecta this year with its three major cast additions. First there were Darren Criss—who's exploded with popularity—and Chord Overstreet. Now there's Ashley Fink's Lauren. And while the tough-only-on-the-outside Lauren can deliciously out-sass Santana Lopez, it's her straight-talking that really has me sold."

=== Characterization ===
In her first episode, it is revealed that Lauren is a member of William McKinley High's wrestling team. TV Squad has said that "Lauren can deliver a zinger with the bite of Sue Sylvester and the humor of our beloved Brittany Pierce." Seth Abramovitch of TV.com expressed his dissatisfaction with her attitude: "Zizes isn't just a heavy, supremely confident girl. She's also extremely violent. She's on the wrestling team, speaks regularly of injuring Puck, and, in one hallway smackdown against the jealous Santana Lopez, proved she was a lot more than just bark. And you did catch that part about Zizes wanting to be famous for famous' sake, right? That she was willing to give herself up to Puck purely in pursuit of a reality show and fragrance line? There's a word for people who do things like that in the real world: It's 'asshole'." He went on to add: "Zizes has been hailed by feminists groups (well, by Bust Magazine) as a new kind of plus-sized heroine—an obese female role model who for once doesn't hate herself. On the contrary, she thinks she's the bee's knees. When 'Puck serenaded her with Queen's "Fat-Bottomed Girls," she rebuffed him, saying, 'I look like America looks, and just like America, I need more than just a song to get my juices flowing'."

Journalist James Poniewozik of Time magazine commented of the episode "Silly Love Songs": "It was the kind of twist Glee can sell, partly because of the way the characters are established (in retrospect, you can see how a really strong woman who rejects him is a turn-on for Puck) and because of how well its cast (Ashley Fink has been killing it as Lauren, and sells her confidence and abrasiveness in a way that makes her a person, not an engineered positive-body-image model). And while Glee sometimes stretches to pick on-the-nose song choices, "Fat Bottomed Girls" was just a perfect choice and performance—not just on topic but actually in Puck's musical wheelhouse."

=== Relationships ===
Over the course of Glee's second season, Lauren forms a relationship with local bad boy and football star Noah Puckerman. As the season progresses, Lauren and Puck's relationship continues to grow stronger. Their relationship begins to form in the ninth episode of the second season titled "Special Education". After Puck attempts to recruit new members for the William McKinley High School glee club, members of the football team lock him in a port-a-potty. After being discovered by Lauren, he convinces her to join New Directions, despite her belief that show choir is stupid. Ashley Fink said of their relationship: "I think Ryan Murphy has a master plan and we're all kind of along for the ride. I know what you mean, but I wouldn't count us out just yet on that front. We all have to laugh at ourselves but it's going somewhere. Ultimately, it comes down to whether audiences will buy a relationship between Puck and Lauren. I think there's a really hilarious chemistry between Puck and Lauren. I think he's a badass, she's a badass. I don't know, I think they're funny together. There's something about the two of them together that I like, so I hope it's not outside the realm of possibility."

Television critics have responded positively to the pairing. Robert Canning of IGN said of the episode "Silly Love Songs": "The absolute best part of "Silly Love Songs" was Puckerman's unexpected longing for Lauren Zizes. Actress Ashley Fink has been fantastic in her small role, delivering great one-liners with ease. She was equally strong in this, the first episode to truly give Lauren a larger role and fill out her character more. Heck, it was nice to even see her smile a few times. The casting on Glee has either been very smart or very lucky since so many background characters have shined as they've been given bigger parts. The Lauren and Puck pairing came with a lot of laughs, but just as much heart. Puck singing Queen's "Fat Bottomed Girls," induced a chuckle at first, then some toe tapping. But it was Lauren's reaction that truly made the moment: 'That's the first song you've sung to me and it made me feel like crap.' I can't decide if I want to root for this couple, but I certainly know I'm going to be rooting for Lauren." Emily VanDerWerff of The A.V. Club commented: "For me, the episode's highlight was the very sweet, funny courtship between Puck and Lauren. This may be because the writers have trouble writing for a self-professed bad boy, even though his escapades are straight out of Archie comics and not actually all that “bad” at all. But it's always fun to watch Salling sing, and it's always fun to watch him be smitten. Fink ends up being a good match for him, chemistry-wise, as she projects a confidence and certainty that makes it immediately obvious just what Puck sees in Lauren. The storyline also played out like both characters had something approaching real feelings." In the following episode, VanDerWerff found her relationship with Puck "a lot less assured" than before, but Entertainment Weekly's Sandra Gonzalez deemed their scenes "as endearing as they are unrealistic", and E! Online's Jenna Mullins wrote that "the ice around [her] heart melted just a bit when Puck mouthed Lauren that little bit of encouragement at the start of her solo."

== Reception ==
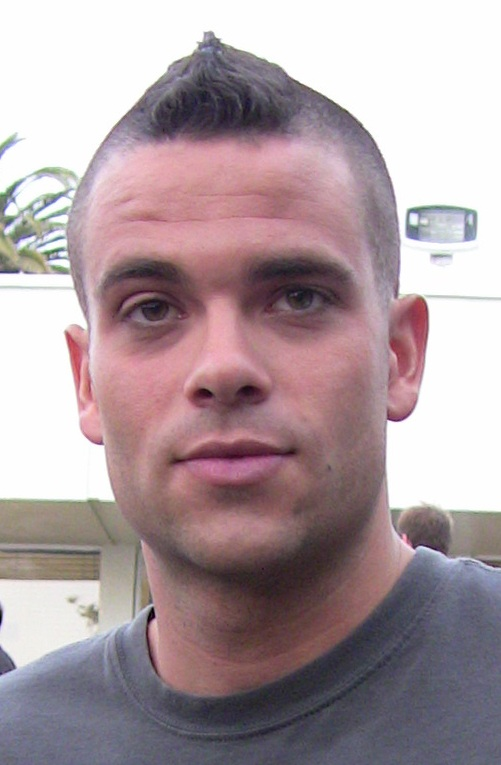
Puck (Mark Salling, pictured) plays a large role in Lauren's storylines.

Lauren has received mostly positive reviews from television critics. Canning praised Fink's performance in the episode "Silly Love Songs", as well as Lauren's dialog. Lisa Respers France of CNN commented that she is beginning to really like Lauren, noting: "for me Lauren represents how Ryan Murphy is able to take the concept of the outcast, flip it on its ear and shove it back in our faces with a side order of fabulousness." Reiter felt that in "Comeback", new characters Lauren and Sam "managed to shine".

Rosie O'Donnell reacted negatively to Fink's casting and first solo musical performance. In an interview with Access Hollywood, she deemed her rendition of "I Know What Boys Like" underwhelming, and stated that it failed to meet her expectations. She called Lauren "so unlikable," and questioned why the producers had not cast a "pretty heavy girl". Fink brushed off O'Donnell's comments. O'Donnell later apologized, and said, "Oh, Ashley – I love your swagger – your acting – your face – your heart – as a famous fat person – I am often asked about the issue… I love the story line – I love the show – and if in any way something I said hurt you – I apologize MORE. You are so talented, and I can't wait to hear you belt it…as I know you can—the often misquoted Rosie." Fink was defended by Justin Thompson of Socialite Life, who commented: "I've loved her character and how they've developed her and she's just become a source of great comedy – is that because she's full-figured? No. Is it because her character is well-written? Yes. It's kind of sad to see Rosie lambaste what the show is trying to do."

Raymund Flandez of The Wall Street Journal called Lauren's performance of "I Know What Boys Like" the highlight of "Comeback". Gonzalez was less than enthused. She graded it "C−", after "deductions", and said the only reason it started with a "C" was due to it being interspersed with shots of the cast in their underwear. Patrick Burns of The Atlantic was also unimpressed, and questioned Lauren's spot in the glee club, commenting "her brazen character never ceases to please, but it's just not believable that she would join the glee club if she cannot sing."
