= Ashley Fink =

American actress and singer (born 1986)

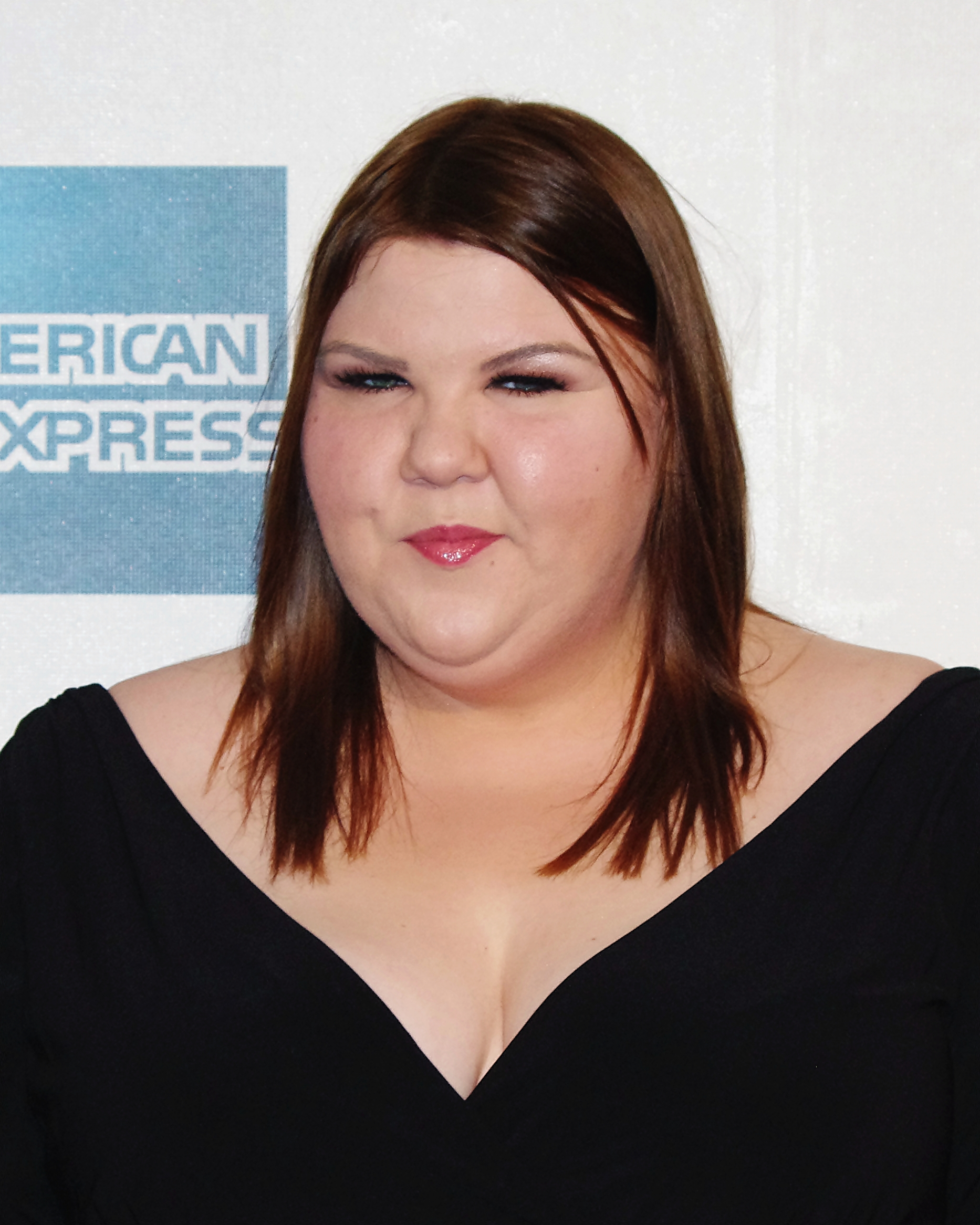
- Fink at the 2012 Tribeca Film Festival premiere of Struck by Lightning
- Born: November 20, 1986 (age 39); Houston, Texas, U.S.
- Occupations: Actress; singer
- Years active: 1990–present

Ashley Fink (born November 20, 1986) is an American actress and singer. She has played the roles of Lauren Zizes in the television series Glee and Carter McMahon in Huge.

== Early life ==
Ashley Fink studied acting at an arts high school, where she performed in adaptations including "The Wizard of Oz" (as the Lion) and "You're a Good Man Charlie Brown" (as Lucy).

== Career ==
One of Fink's early roles was in the Tribeca Film Festival hit Fat Girls. She appeared on the family drama Make It or Break It, was the recurring character Lauren Zizes on Fox's Glee, and starred as Carter McMahon on the ABC Family show Huge. She also appeared in the Walt Disney Pictures film You Again starring Betty White, Jamie Lee Curtis, and Sigourney Weaver and in All About Evil alongside Mink Stole, Cassandra Peterson, Natasha Lyonne and Thomas Dekker. Fink produced her first short film starring Camille Winbush titled "Olivia," which had its premiere at the Frameline Film Festival in San Francisco.

Fink was cast as Lauren Zizes on the Fox television series Glee, making her initial appearance in the first season episode "Wheels" as a champion high school wrestler and cheerleader tryout candidate. She made occasional appearances until the ninth episode of the second season, "Special Education," when she became the glee club's twelfth member. She joined after Kurt Hummel (Chris Colfer) transferred to another school. Fink stated in an interview, "I was obsessed with Glee before I was a big part of it, and I’ve steadily been on it for a while. When I got the script where I joined the Glee Club, I texted Chris Colfer and said, 'I think I just joined the Glee club?' I didn’t quite believe it at first; I thought I was getting 'Punk'd.'"

Fink's character quit the glee club in the series season 3 premiere, "The Purple Piano Project." While she appeared in a non-speaking capacity in the Season 3 episode "Asian F" and series creator Murphy alluded to her character's reentry into the plot through interactions with Kurt Hummel, Fink confirmed later that season that she would not be returning to the series. However, she subsequently reprised her role in the season 4 episode "Sadie Hawkins" and the season 6 series finale, "Dreams Come True".

Fink also appears in the music video for the 2004 Stacie Orrico single "I Could Be the One."

In 2024, Fink had a supporting role in the film Lake George.

== Filmography ==
Film
Year	Title	Role	Notes
2004	The Wedding Video	Cinnamon	
2006	Fat Girls	Sabrina Thomas	
2008	Hacket	Grace	Television film
2010	All About Evil	Lolita	
2010	You Again	Sunday	
2011	Glee: The 3D Concert Movie	Lauren Zizes	
2016	Accidentally Engaged	Melody	
2019	The Turkey Bowl	Cammie Newton	
2019	A Merry Christmas Match	Mindy	Movie
2024	Lake George	Nadja	

Television
Year	Title	Role	Notes
2005	ER	Margo	Episode: "Wake Up"
2006	Gilmore Girls	Artsy girl	Uncredited; episode: "'S Wonderful, 'S Marvelous"
2007	Blue	Beatrice	1 episode
2009	Make It or Break It	Herself	1 episode
2009–2010	Warren the Great	Ashley, the Barista	2 episodes
2010	Huge	Carter McMahon	6 episodes
2009–2011, 2013, 2015	Glee	Lauren Zizes	Recurring; 25 episodes
2011	The Glee Project	Herself	1 episode
2012	Austin & Ally	Mindy	2 episodes
2013	Anger Management	Donna	Episode: "Charlie and Kate's Dirty Pictures"
2015	K.C. Undercover	Reena	Episode: "Pilot"
2015	Criminal Minds	Dana Seavers	Episode: "'Til Death Do Us Part"

Music videos
Year	Artist	Song	Notes
2004	Stacie Orrico	"I Could Be the One"	Background girl

== Discography ==
=== Singles ===
Single	Year	Peak chart positions					Album
Single	Year	US	AUS	CAN	IRL	UK	Album
"I Know What Boys Like"	2011	—	—	—	—	—	Glee: The Music, Dance Party
"—" denotes releases that did not chart
