= Tom Degnan =

American actor

Tom Degnan (born September 24, 1982, in Bucks County, Pennsylvania) is an American actor. He is best known for his role on One Life to Live as Joey Buchanan from 2010 to 2011. He also appeared in As the World Turns in 2009 as Riley Morgan/Adam Munson. Additional appearances include Handsome Harry, alongside Steve Buscemi, and Little Miss Perfect, alongside Lilla Crawford. In 2013 he played the role of Fire Marshall Rick Kelly in the 10th episode of the 4th season of the CBS police procedural drama Blue Bloods in the episode "Mistaken Identity". He has also played roles in the TV shows Lipstick Jungle, Law & Order, The Unusuals, The Good Wife, White Collar, The Following, Magic City, Bones, Person of Interest, The Michael J. Fox Show, Madam Secretary, and The Sonnet Project. In 2013 he played the role of Chris Van Helsing in the made-for-TV movie Gothica and played the role of Matt in the 2014 made-for-TV movie Tin Man. In 2015 he played the role of Jim in the romance-drama film To Whom It May Concern and played the role of Tom in the short story drama film Seclusion. Degnan also had a recurring role on CBS' Limitless. He is a graduate of the MFA Acting program at Case Western Reserve University.

== Personal life ==
Degnan married fellow actor Erin Cummings on July 2, 2016, with the ceremony taking place at the Basilica of the University of Notre Dame, Indiana. Together they have two children, a son and a daughter.

== Filmography ==
Year	Title	Role	Notes
2021	Grummy	Jack	Short
2021	CSI: Vegas	Tyler Clement	Episode: "Honeymoon in Vegas"
2021	King Richard	Girl #8 Father	Film
2020	Adult Night	Roger	Short
2019	The Code	Lieutenant Ike Pfister	Episode: "1st Civ Div"
2017	NCIS: Naval Criminal Investigative Service	Lonnie Davis	Episode: "Voices"
2017	Consciousness		Short
2017	NCIS: New Orleans	Matt Aufiero	Episode: "Slay the Dragon"
2017	Bones	Adam Hitchcock	Episode: "The Grief and the Girl"
2017	Bull	Special Agent John Riley	Episode: "It's Classified"
2016	Mr Robot	Ross Thomas	Episode: "eps2.4_m4ster-s1ave.aes"
2016	Little Miss Perfect	Mr Davy	
2016	To Whom It May Concern	Jim	
2015	Seclusion	Tom	Short
2015	The Sonnet Project	The Sonneteer	Episode: "Sonnet #29"
2015–2016	Limitless	Agent Ike	19 episodes
2014	Tin Man	Matt	Television movie
2014	Madam Secretary	Jim Ionesco	Episode: "Need to Know"
2014	The Michael J. Fox Show	Handyman	Episode: "Sochi"
2013	Gothica	Chris Van Helsing	
2013	Person of Interest	Agent Easton	Episode: "Lethe"
2013	Blue Bloods	Fire Marshal Rick Kelly	Episode: "Mistaken Identity"
2013	The Following	Head US Marshall	2 episodes
2012–2013	Magic City	Pierce Fuller	6 episodes
2012	White Collar	Leonard Grant	Episode: "Checkmate"
2010-2012	One Life to Live	Joey Buchanan	126 episodes
2010	The Good Wife	Brad Broussard	Episode: "Bang"
2009	As the World Turns	Adam Munson/Sgt Riley Morgan	27 episodes
2009	The Unusuals	Andrew Ogilvy	Episode: "The Apology Line"
2009	Law & Order	Nick Spence	Episode: "All New"
2009	Handsome Harry	Young Harry	Film
2008	Lipstick Jungle	Man	Episode: "Chapter Eighteen: Indecent Exposure"
