= Little Miss Perfect (disambiguation) =

Little Miss Perfect is an American reality television series.

Little Miss Perfect may also refer to:

- Little Miss Perfect (film), a 2016 American drama
- "Little Miss Perfect", a song by Sugababes from the album Sweet 7
- "Little Miss Perfect" (song), a song by Summer Matthews
- "Little Miss Perfect", a song by Joriah Kwamé featuring Taylor Louderman
