= Jay Malone =

Canadian comedian

Jay Malone is a Canadian comedian from Kentville, Nova Scotia.

== Early career ==
Malone began doing standup comedy in 1999 while studying at the University of New Brunswick in Fredericton. He entered a comedy competition at a local pool hall called the "Right Spot" on a dare and made it all the way to the semi-finals. The following summer, after doing shows around town with a short lived sketch/standup troupe in Fredericton, Malone made the move to Toronto to pursue comedy full-time. Within two years he was headlining across the country and appearing on television in both national and international commercials and comedic series. He made three straight appearances at the Halifax Comedy Festival (2003, 2004, 2005) and was featured on The Toronto Show (Toronto One) in 2003.

In 2004 Malone was invited to the prestigious Just For Laughs Festival to perform in the national Homegrown Competition. He took first place in the contest and was immediately signed with a US management/agency team. Later that year he was flown to Los Angeles where he met with casting agents in Hollywood and would return in February/March the next year to audition for network sitcoms. In the fall of 2004 Malone shot his first nationally televised special, a one-hour episode of the standup series Comedy Now! on CTV and The Comedy Network. The special was chosen by the network to be the 100th episode special and received nationwide critical acclaim.

In 2005 Malone returned to the Just For Laughs Festival to shoot a gala for CBC Television. He is one of only two comedians to have won the Homegrown Competition and be invited back to perform a gala the very next year. Also in 2005, he was nominated in the "Best Male Standup Comic" category at the Canadian Comedy Awards. The CTV sketch comedy series Comedy Inc. commissioned Malone to write sketches for the show in 2005. In 2006, Malone was hired on staff by the show and was featured in a few sketches and went on to write for the show for three seasons. Later that same year he shot a pilot for CTV and the Comedy Network, called House Party, co-starring David Reale.

== Move to Los Angeles ==
Malone made the official move to Los Angeles in August 2007 after obtaining his O-1 Visa. Shortly thereafter he began doing commercials and was cast in his first guest starring role on Boston Legal the following year. He followed that up in the summer of 2008 by being cast in the Pilot Worst Week for CBS and the pilot Man Of Your Dreams for NBC.

In 2009 Malone guest starred opposite Chris O'Donnell on an episode of NCIS: Los Angeles as a tax evading video game company CEO. He also guest starred as corrupt police officer "Russell DiMarco" on an episode of Monk opposite Tony Shalhoub. In November 2009 Malone was awarded a Development Deal with FOX for his Animated Short: SANTA INTERVENTION, which was awarded first prize in the international animation competition "The FOX Holiday Challenge". He followed up that animation with an animated version of the Tiger Woods Apology which has received over 2 million views. Malone is currently developing another animated series which he will be pitching to networks this spring.

In 2010 Malone guest starred in Dollhouse as Clyde Randolph opposite Eliza Dushku and Harry Lennix and starred in an independent comedy by film maker/comedian Mark Bennett titled The Zombie Hell House Massacre IV. He also shot his own 30 minute standup special for the Showtime comedy series "Laugh Out Loud"

2011 was a busy year for Malone as he continued to headline across the US and Canada and was cast in his first two feature films. He plays the Algebra teacher in the upcoming film "Struck By Lightning" with Chris Colfer, Christina Hendricks, and Allison Janney. He also played the fast talking, soulless Loan Manager in the upcoming independent feature film "Dumbells" directed by Christopher Livingston. He also wrote for the MTV movie awards, the 2011 NASCAR Awards, and the Pilot "Moral Dilemma" for BBC America.

In December 2011 Malone was cast as the lead in the "Untitled Conaco Project" for TBS alongside David Neher, Elizabeth Ho, Julie Haggerty and Barry Bostwick, directed by Beth McCarthy-Miller (SNL, 30 Rock, Modern Family). In the show he plays Mark Danson, a family man who quits his day job and returns to the neighborhood where he grew up. There, he reunites with his quirky childhood best friend Roland who still lives with his parents.

Malone also hosted "Shit Talk Daily" a weekly podcast with friend and fellow comedian Mark Bennett and wrote and starred in a semi-weekly video series called "Rapid Fire Tabloid News" with co-host Jay Hayden.

In August 2012, he began filming in Vancouver a 13-part CityTV comedy series called Package Deal, co-starring with Harland Williams.
