= Julia Voth =

Canadian actress and model

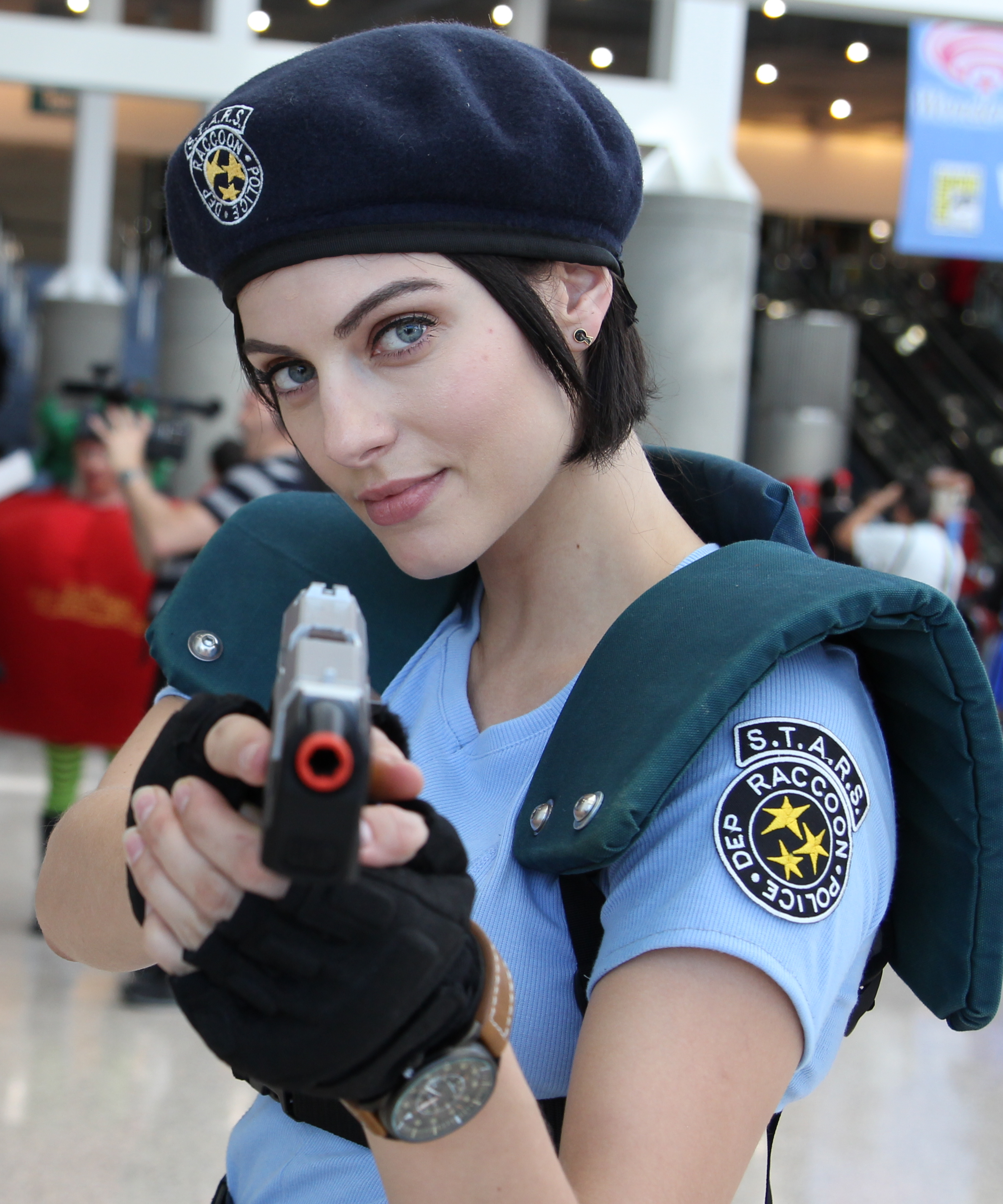
- Julia Voth cosplaying as Jill Valentine at WonderCon 2016
- Born: May 16, 1985 (age 41); Saskatoon, Saskatchewan
- Occupations: Actress, model
- Years active: 1999–present
- Spouse: David Zonshine
- Children: 2
- Website: juliavoth.com

Julia Voth (born May 16, 1985) is a Canadian model and actress. She is best known for lending her likeliness as the character model for Jill Valentine in a number of the Resident Evil video games, beginning with Resident Evil (2002), as well as for her roles in the 2009 film Bitch Slap and the TV-series Package Deal.

== Early life ==
Julia Anne Voth was born on May 16, 1985, in Saskatoon, Saskatchewan. She was raised on a farm in the Canadian Prairies. Voth's modeling career began in 1999 at the age of 14, when she attended a modeling convention in Vancouver, where she was discovered by an agent from Tokyo. The agent offered her a two-month contract to work in Japan.

== Career ==
=== Modeling ===
Voth's modeling career has included photo shoots and commercials for brands such as Calvin Klein and Guess. In 2001, at the age of 15, she auditioned and landed the role of Jill Valentine, serving as her character model, beginning in the 2002 game Resident Evil, which became one of the best-selling GameCube games of all time. Her likeness was also used for Jill Valentine in Resident Evil: The Umbrella Chronicles (2007) and Resident Evil 5 (2009). In 2016, after receiving a custom-made Resident Evil beret from a fan, Voth was inspired to do a photoshoot cosplaying as Valentine.

=== Acting ===
Voth starred alongside America Olivo and Erin Cummings in the 2009 action film Bitch Slap, playing the down-on-her-luck stripper named Trixie. Bitch Slap played at multiple film festivals, including the Idyllwild Festival of Cinema, where she won the category of Best Actress. She has also appeared on episodes of television series such as Castle, Supernatural, and Huge. Voth had a main role in the comedy sitcom Package Deal, which ran for two seasons from 2013 to 2014.

== Personal life ==
Voth has been based in Los Angeles since 2007. In 2018, she married David Zonshine. They have two daughters, born in 2020 and 2022.

== Filmography ==
=== Film ===
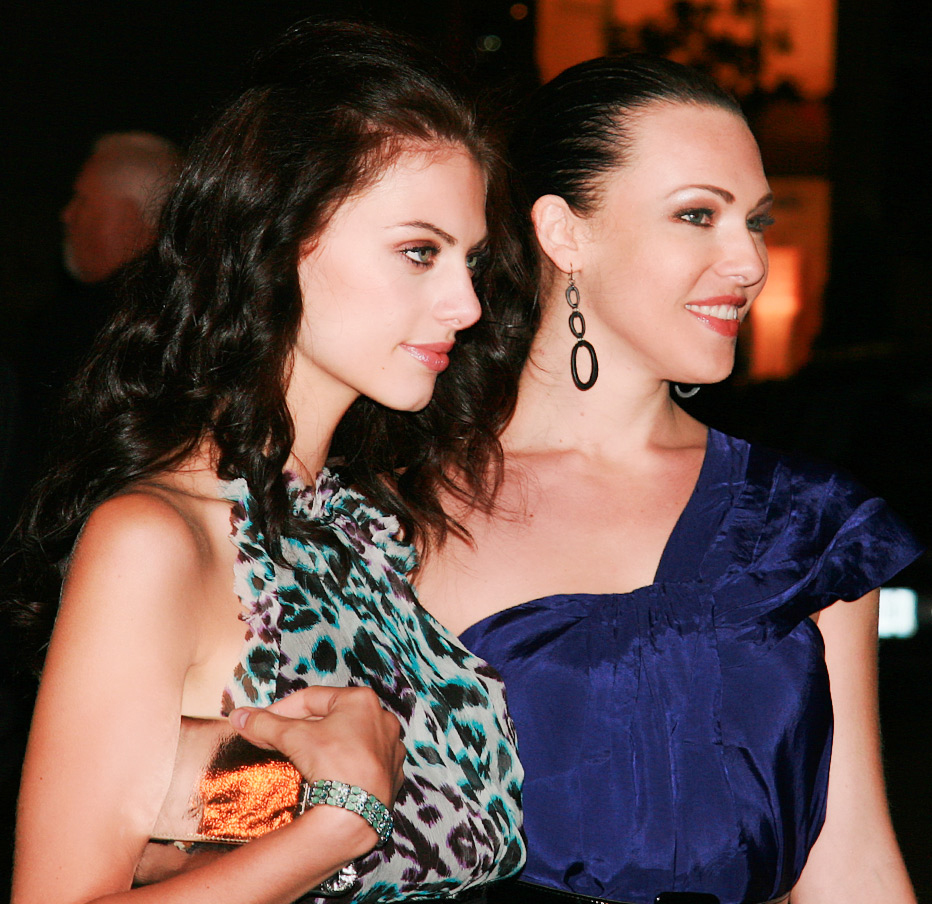
Voth (left) with Erin Cummings at the TIFF premier of Bitch Slap in 2009

Year	Title	Role	Notes	Refs.
2009	Bitch Slap	Trixie		
2009	Love Hurts	Young Amanda Bingham		
2009	The Anniversary	Shelly		
2011	Alone	Sarah Eastwood	Short film	
2011	Lilith	Sarah		
2012	Project S.E.R.A.	Gillean Eames	Short film	
2013	Holiday High School Reunion	Katie		
2015	Painkillers	Masters		
2016	Seattle Road	Eve		
2017	Hard Surfaces	Liz Van Houten		
2019	Bit	Siran		

=== Television ===
Year	Title	Role	Notes	Refs.
2009	The Phone	Agent #1	Regular role	
2010	Huge	Chelsey	"Parents' Weekend: Parts 1 & 2"	
2010	Supernatural	Prostitute	"The Third Man"	
2011	Castle	Violet Young	"To Love and Die in L.A."	
2013	Project: SERA	Gillian Eames	Web series; main role	
2013–2014	Package Deal	Kim Mattingly	Main role	

=== Ludography ===
Year	Title	Role	Notes	Refs.
2002	Resident Evil	Jill Valentine	Likeness	
2007	Resident Evil: The Umbrella Chronicles	Jill Valentine	Likeness	
2009	Resident Evil 5	Jill Valentine	Likeness	

== Awards and nominations ==
Year	Award / festival	Category	Work	Result	Refs.
2009	Idyllwild Festival of Cinema	Best Actress	Bitch Slap	Won	

== See also ==
- List of cosplayers
- List of people from Saskatoon
