= Package Deal (TV series) =

- Genre: Sitcom
- Created by: Andrew Orenstein
- Starring: Randal Edwards; Harland Williams; Jay Malone; Julia Voth
- Country of origin: Canada
- Original language: English
- No. of seasons: 2
- No. of episodes: 26

Production
- Executive producers: Andrew Orenstein; Tim Gamble; Michael Shepard
- Production locations: Burnaby, British Columbia
- Camera setup: Multiple
- Running time: 22 minutes
- Production companies: Grasshopper Lane Entertainment; Thunderbird Films; Rogers Media

Original release
- Network: City
- Release: 18 June 2013 – 21 December 2014

Package Deal is a Canadian television sitcom created by Andrew Orenstein about three brothers and the woman who comes between them. It debuted on City on June 18, 2013 and ran for two seasons.

== Premise ==
Danny thinks Kim might be the one. His older brothers, who raised him after their parents died, are not so fond of her. Sheldon avoids relationships but is in favour of one-night stands. Ryan's wife divorced him and hooked up with a fellow surgeon after he put her through medical school. Kim is not happy with how intimately involved Sheldon and Ryan are in Danny's life.

== Cast ==
- Randal Edwards as Danny, a criminal defense lawyer
- Harland Williams as Sheldon, a stubborn and politically incorrect salesman
- Jay Malone as Ryan, a metrosexual former house-husband
- Julia Voth as Kim, owner of a loose-tea shop

=== Recurring cast ===
- Eugene Levy as McKenzie, a client of Danny's whose wives keep mysteriously dying
- Pamela Anderson as Dr. Sydney Forbes, Ryan's quirky therapist who has an intimate approach

== Production ==
Package Deal is a four-camera comedy primarily filmed with a studio audience, which is rare for Canadian television. The concept of the show comes from creator Andrew Orenstein's experiences with his family. The first-season finale was filmed in Burnaby, British Columbia on January 25, 2013.

Package Deal was renewed for a second season on January 21, 2014. In March 2015, Rogers Media announced that the series would not return for a third season.

== Broadcast ==
On May 29, 2013, Citytv announced it had commissioned 13 episodes of Package Deal for the 2012-13 mid-season television season. It was announced on 1 April 2013 that the show would premiere on 6 May, taking the spot in the schedule that had been occupied by Seed. Later in April that was changed to 24 June. As part of Rogers' upfront presentation on 4 June it was announced that Package Deal had been moved to the autumn and would be on Mondays at 8:30 ET. The series premiere was subsequently again changed to 18 June at 9 p.m. ET/PT, 10 p.m. MT, and 8 p.m. CT and labelled a special preview.

== Episodes ==
=== Series overview ===
Series	Episodes	Originally released	
Series	Episodes	First released	Last released
1	13	18 June 2013	16 January 2014
2	13	12 September 2014	21 December 2014

=== Season 1 (2013–14) ===
No. overall	No. in season	Title	Directed by	Written by	Original release date
1	1	"The Dinner" "The Picnic"	Adam Weissman	Andrew Orenstein	18 June 2013
After his brothers make a terrible first impression and scare off his new girlfriend, Danny enlists their help to get her back but Kim isn't sure this relationship is worth it if it really is a 'package deal'.
2	2	"Prank Wars"	Adam Weissman	Andrew Orenstein	7 October 2013
Kim feels left out of the brothers' "prank wars". Her attempts to join in go awry, but the brothers ultimately welcome her into the fold by making her the subject of an elaborate prank.
3	3	"I Love You???"	Adam Weissman	Simon McNabb	14 October 2013
Danny and Kim's relationship is in jeopardy when he accidentally blurts out "I love you" during sex. His backtracking only makes it worse, especially once he realizes he really does love her.
4	4	"Kim vs. Karaoke"	Adam Weissman	Stevie Ray Fromstein	21 October 2013
When Kim starts monopolizing Danny's time, Sheldon and Ryan try to find her a friend in order to get Danny's attention back for an upcoming karaoke tournament.
5	5	"Bully"	Jonathan A. Rosenbaum	Jason Belleville	28 October 2013
Danny tries to make amends to a client he bullied as a child by giving him the world's best defense – but he’s left on the hook when the client unexpectedly dies in the middle of the trial.
6	6	"Danny Escapes to Prison"	Keith Samples	Andrew Orenstein	7 November 2013
The mounting tension between Kim and his brothers leads Danny to spend his downtime with his client, McKenzie, in prison. Sheldon enlists Nikki as his model for a casket ad.
7	7	"Sheldon Pretends to Be Danny"	Keith Samples	Denise Moss	14 November 2013
Danny's birthday present for Kim is stolen when Sheldon repeatedly uses Danny's apartment (and identity) to seduce morally dubious women. Ryan stakes out a jewelry store in hopes of meeting his ex-wife's new beau.
8	8	"Ryan's Therapist"	Steve Wright	Elizabeth MacKenzie	21 November 2013
When Ryan's therapist moves out of town, Danny gets him a job at Kim's tea shop. But Ryan goes off the rails when he discovers the therapist is still in town – and lied just to get rid of him.
9	9	"A Few Good Muffins"	Steve Wright	Stevie Ray Fromstein	28 November 2013
When Kim gets into an altercation with a masseuse at a day spa, Danny represents her at trial. Ryan meets his new therapist, Dr. Sydney Forbes, and finds himself very uncomfortable with her unorthodox style.
10	10	"Big Brothers"	Steve Wright	Elizabeth MacKenzie & Simon McNabb	12 December 2013
Sheldon has Kim train him to be a gentleman in hopes of winning back the girl of his dreams. Danny, nervous about accepting an upcoming award, tries out Ryan's new therapist.
11	11	"It's My Party"	Keith Samples	Jason Belleville	2 January 2014
When Sheldon lands a party-planning gig for an important Judge, Danny steps in to make sure everything runs smoothly. Ryan's new therapist falls for him and it threatens their professional relationship.
12	12	"Sick Puppy"	Steve Wright	Denise Moss & Andrew Orenstein	9 January 2014
When Danny falls ill, Ryan and Kim compete over who can take care of him best. Meanwhile, Sheldon and Kim's employee Nikki are left in charge of Kim's tea shop, which they turn into a profitable coffee-and-pizza joint.
13	13	"Kangaroo Court"	Keith Samples	Denise Moss & Andrew Orenstein	16 January 2014
When Ryan runs into Alison's best friend, Sheldon helps him look good by saying Kim is his girlfriend. But soon, the lie spirals out of control, forcing the gang to keep up the charade over the course of an entire dinner party – the success of which could have dire consequences for a very important trial.

=== Season 2 (2014) ===
No. overall	No. in season	Title	Directed by	Written by	Original release date
14	1	"Silverball"	Jon Rosenbaum	Rob Sheridan	12 September 2014
Danny is left by himself when he chooses to break a tradition with the boys by going to see a James Bond movie with Kim.
15	2	"Sloppy Seconds"	Jon Rosenbaum	Denise Moss	26 September 2014
Kim reluctantly agrees to let Dan stay at hers, whilst Sheldon stays at Danny's. Whilst Kim is out, Sheldon takes the opportunity to try and uncover any secrets Kim is hiding, leading to the discovery of something that may throw a wrench into Kim and Danny's relationship.
16	3	"Sex, Sex, Sex"	Unknown	Unknown	3 October 2014
Danny and Kim realise they have fallen into a "sex slump" and neither of them know how to fix their problems. Ryan's new girlfriend wants him to choke her during sex, something that makes him feel very uncomfortable. Sheldon dates a woman who is only happy when staying in a hotel, a habit he cannot afford. When looking for answers to their problems, the gang end up bumping into one another at a sex shop.
17	4	"How I Met Your Brother"	Unknown	Unknown	10 October 2014
Danny and Kim tells Ryan and Sheldon the story of how they first met.
18	5	"Danny's New Job"	Unknown	Unknown	17 October 2014
Danny begins a new job at a huge law firm, where no matter how hard he tries he can't seem to get his boss to like him.
19	6	"The Imperfect Storm"	Unknown	Unknown	3 November 2014
When Ryan befriends his hero – a local celebrity weatherman who turns out to be an annoying jackass, Ryan is left looking for ways to leave his new friendship.
20	7	"Two Half Men"	Unknown	Unknown	10 November 2014
Ryan and Sheldon are shocked when they learn they are dating the same woman.
21	8	"Downton Danny"	Unknown	Unknown	17 November 2014
Ryan tries not to break the code when he fills in for an intern.
22	9	"Everybody Loves Beth"	Unknown	Unknown	24 November 2014
Kim becomes very jealous of Ryan's new girlfriend.
23	10	"Tea for Too Few"	Unknown	Unknown	27 November 2014
When a big chain tea shop opens across the street from The Loose Leaf, Sheldon helps give Kim's business a competitive edge.
24	11	"Storage Lore"	Unknown	Unknown	27 November 2014
Ryan is distraught after Sheldon sells off a storage locker full of White family memorabilia, including his prized stuffed trout.
25	12	"Breakup Part 1"	Unknown	Unknown	21 December 2014
When Sheldon and Ryan learn of Danny's intentions to propose, they hijack a bachelor party to fulfil their own agenda of changing Danny's mind. Kim learns Danny is going to propose and blows him off when he tries to propose.
26	13	"Breakup Part 2"	Unknown	Unknown	21 December 2014
Danny and Kim have broken up and he tries to move on while she soon has a regular boyfriend. They return to each other.
