= David Zonshine =

American music executive

- Born: United States
- Occupations: Music executive, A&R scout, film and television producer, photographer
- Spouse: Julia Voth
- Children: 2

David Zonshine is a music executive, A&R scout and film producer who has worked at various companies including Interscope Records, DreamWorks Records, and Universal Music Group. Zonshine is currently working with the George Harrison estate as well as managing his son Dhani Harrison. Along with Harrison, Zonshine relaunched George Harrison's iconic record label Dark Horse Records which also now oversees the Joe Strummer Estate and works with various artists/estates including, Cat Stevens, Billy Idol, Leon Russell, Ravi Shankar, and more.

== Film producer ==
Zonshine produced the Jack Dishel web series DRYVRS starring Macaulay Culkin. The first episode features Macaulay Culkin playing an unnamed character who strongly resembles his childhood role from Home Alone. The YouTube video went viral with over 6 million views on its first day of release and the number of views grew to 20 million in its first week online. Subsequent episodes featured Tom Petty, Rosanna Arquette, Darren Criss, Seth Green, Jeff Garlin, Steven Weber, Kevin Pollak, Rodney Mullen, Jakob Dylan, Dhani Harrison, and Nick Valensi of The Strokes. To date, the series currently has over 100 million views between various social media platforms.

Zonshine also produced the concert film George Fest which was a tribute concert to former Beatle George Harrison, held at The Fonda Theatre in Los Angeles on 28 September 2014. Among the many performers were Brian Wilson and Al Jardine of the Beach Boys, Brandon Flowers of the Killers, Dhani Harrison, Norah Jones, the Flaming Lips, Conan O'Brien, Spoon, Ben Harper as well as members of The Strokes and Weezer The film debuted on March 20, 2016, simultaneously on MTV Live (TV channel) and VH1 Classic.

In 2016 Zonshine co-produced Adam Green's Aladdin which stars Macaulay Culkin, Natasha Lyonne, Jack Dishel and Zoe Kravitz.

Zonshine along with Steven Sebring and Dhani Harrison, produced the 2016 skateboard film Liminal, which celebrated Rodney Mullen's return to skateboarding after a 12-year absence.

In 2022, Zonshine produced Futra Days, which stars Brandon Sklenar, Tania Raymonde and Rosanna Arquette.

== Photography ==
Zonshine's photographs have been published in major publications including Rolling Stone, The New York Times, Elle, and ESPN.

== Personal life ==
Zonshine is married to the Canadian model and actress Julia Voth. They have a daughter, born in 2020 and another child born in 2022.
