= Who Was...? =

Series of children's books

Who Was? or Who HQ is a series of children's non-fiction books published by Penguin Books. The "Who Was...?", "What Was?...", "Where Is?...", "What Is the Story Of?...", "What Do We Know About?...", "Who HQ: The 50 States" and "Who HQ Now" series tell the stories of trailblazers, legends, innovators, significant landmarks, and historical events. Covering everything from sports to politics, the "Who HQ Now" series focuses on trending topics and prominent subjects discussed in the news. As of December 2022, the series had over 250 entries, sold over 20 million copies, and has been on the New York Times Best Seller list.

The first four Who Was? books — Who Was Sacagawea?, Who Was Ben Franklin?, Who Was Albert Einstein?, and Who Was Annie Oakley?—were published on February 18, 2002. Penguin Books publishes about 24 new books each year. Example entrants in the series due for publication in 2026 include John Cena, Cleopatra, "Weird Al" Yankovic, Lizzie Borden, Rita Moreno, Vera Wang, Greek Mythology, the Trail of Tears, Rocky Mountains, Dragons, and more.

== Book format ==
There are about 80 illustrations in each book — one on almost every page, and always one for each sidebar. The large heads were inspired by the caricatures that used to be drawn for the weekly cover of the New York Times Book Review. Some books include those for famous people like Stevie Wonder, Ronald Reagan and Jeff Kinney.

== TV adaptation ==
In 2017, Netflix ordered a 13-episode variety show based on the books, The Who Was? Show. The series was developed by Penguin Workshop and FremantleMedia, produced by Rich Korson, and written by Brian McCann, Elliott Kalan, Eric Gilliland, Delaney Yeager, and Tami Sagher. Each half-hour episode was slated to feature "live-action, animated shorts, improvisations, sketches, musical performances and guest appearances."
