= Stranger Than Fanfiction =

2017 novel by Chris Colfer

- Author: Chris Colfer
- Audio read by: Chris Colfer
- Language: English
- Genre: Fiction
- Publisher: Little, Brown Books for Young Readers
- Publication date: February 28, 2017
- Publication place: United States
- Media type: Print (hardback, paperback), e-book, audiobook

Stranger Than Fanfiction is a young adult novel written by author Chris Colfer. It was published by Little, Brown Books for Young Readers on February 28, 2017, and is Colfer's second young adult novel. Stranger Than Fanfiction explores themes of race, friendship, and fame, as well as LGBT themes. It has received widespread press coverage and numerous reviews, and has been featured on several awards lists.

== Background ==
Chris Colfer, author of Stranger Than Fanfiction, notes that although the novel is not an autobiography, it is inspired by his own experience with fame; the author formerly portrayed Kurt Hummel on the television show Glee. At the show's peak, Colfer was a teenager; as a result, he had his coming-of-age experience in the public spotlight. Recognizing the uniqueness of his adolescent experience, Chris Colfer wrote Stranger Than Fanfiction, as he felt that it would add a new and "hilarious" perspective to the world of YA literature.

According to the author, each of the five protagonists in Stranger Than Fanfiction represents some aspect of his teenage experience. For example, Colfer likens Cash Carter's fear of disapproval to his own fear of rejection after publicly coming out as gay on national television. Consequently, Cash develops agoraphobia, an experience that mirrors the author's own agoraphobic feelings during his time on Glee.

Additionally, the author includes plot lines that although aren't personal, he deems worthy of discussion. Although he has stated that he has not experienced issues with gender identity himself, Colfer conducted extensive research on GLAAD websites, consulted friends, and hired sensitivity readers while writing the character Sam Gibson, a transgender protagonist in the novel. The author explains that one of the central messages underlying Stranger Than Fanfiction is that “there's nothing wrong with trying to be a better, more authentic version of yourself”.

== Synopsis ==
Stranger Than Fanfiction features five main characters: Topher Collins, Joey Davis, Sam Gibson, Moriko Ishikawa, and Cash Carter. The first is described as intelligent and as having a close, but stifling relationship with his mother and his brother, the latter of whom has cerebral palsy. Joey Davis is an African-American aspiring actor; he struggles with coming out to his homophobic dad, a prominent Catholic preacher in the town. Sam Gibson is a closeted transgender character; his friends repeatedly misgender him through the novel. Sam experiences difficulty with coming out to his mom, a beauty queen, and his friend Topher, who is in love with him. Mo Ishikawa is a Japanese-American creative writer and aims to become a published author. Finally, Cash Carter is described as a “rough-around-the-edges” actor who has starred on the Wiz Kids show since he was twelve years old. He's a good-looking celebrity who grew up in the spotlight, but yearns for autonomy.

All of the characters, excluding Cash Carter, are high school seniors who are united by their love for the show Wiz Kids. Each dreams of escaping the small, mundane suburb of Downers Grove, Illinois, but before they head off to college, the four decide to go on a final road trip together. Topher jokingly sends an invitation to their favorite actor Cash Carter. The actor, wanting a little adventure in his life, takes the students by surprise and accepts their invitation. The entirety of the book centers on their road-trip adventures as they drive from Illinois to California. Along the way, they run into some scuffles, reveal some dark secrets, and form strong friendships.

== Analysis ==
LGBTQ topics are discussed at great length in Stranger Than Fanfiction. Multiple characters identify as members of the community, including Joey Davis, who is gay, and Sam Gibson, who is both gay and transgender. These characters are in the closet and struggle with coming out; more so, they fear the implications of such revelations on familial and friendship dynamics.

Another prevailing theme is fame; Colfer describes both the good and the bad that comes with being a celebrity, mainly through the plot line of Cash Carter. In the book, Cash laments the loss of privacy as paparazzi chase him everywhere. He also is caught in an identity crisis; although Cash's fans see him as his Wiz Kids character, a nerdy physicist, the actor is a completely different person in real life and struggles to convey this reality to his fans. This conflict, according to Colfer, represents the author's own issues with identity development during his time on Glee.

Colfer also notes that one of the central themes of the book is that our heroes are human. According to the author, fans have a tendency to idolize celebrities, but they fail to recognize that celebrities themselves are imperfect. In fact, they deal with many of the same struggles that everyone deals with.

On the other hand, the author celebrates the concept of "fandom", a term which refers to a celebrity's fanbase. In the book, Cash receives numerous letters from fans around the world. This scene is meant to represent Colfer's own experience with his fans. According to the author, he wanted to "celebrate the symbiosis between the fans and the celebrity" and to show that the fans can have just as much of a positive impact on a celebrity as a celebrity can have on his own fans.

The author also briefly touches upon two additional themes: race and disability. Racial representation is mainly limited to two characters: Mo is Japanese-American and Joey is African-American. In particular, there is one scene in the book when the teenagers have an encounter with a racist gas station owner. Disability is discussed from Topher's perspective, as his brother has cerebral palsy. This storyline stems from Colfer's own family: his sister, Hannah Colfer, has epilepsy.

== Publication history ==
Stranger Than Fanfiction was first published on February 28, 2017, in hardback and e-book formats by Little, Brown Books for Young Readers. An unabridged audiobook adaptation narrated by Colfer was also released by the publisher on the same day. The following year on May 29, 2018, a trade paperback was issued.

== Reception ==
Colfer has largely been praised for giving representation to the LGBTQ+ community, and for approaching relevant topics such as gender identity, sexuality, and self-worth that are considered controversial in modern times.

A reviewer for Booklist wrote a favorable review, writing that "Colfer has a flair for combining poignancy and hilarity so that readers find themselves laughing even as their hearts break a little bit". Melanie Ramdarshan Bold has described Stranger Than Fanfiction as part of a larger popular trend of celebrities capitalizing on the increasing popularity of YA literature in order to touch upon sensitive subjects such as race and sexuality.

The book was placed on several recommended reading lists by outlets such as the Hollywood Reporter and Bustle, and was placed on the New York Times Bestseller List for Young Adult Hardcover Books during the week of March 19, 2017.
