= The Who Was? Show =

American sketch comedy television series

- Genre: Comedy; Sketch comedy Roleplay
- Directed by: Dan Beers
- Starring: Haley Tju; Adam Hochstetter; Kirrilee Berger; Lilla Crawford; Bentley Green; Zach Timson; Andy Daly
- Narrated by: H. Jon Benjamin
- Opening theme: "The Who Was? Show Theme Song"
- Ending theme: "The Who Was? Show Theme Song" (Instrumental)
- Country of origin: United States
- Original language: English
- No. of seasons: 1
- No. of episodes: 13

Production
- Executive producer: Brian Clark
- Producers: Mark DiCristofaro; William Lapp; Aaron Levine; Jon Sheflin; Jason Stiff; Louis Waxman; Bob Higgins; Rich Korson; Jay Peterson; Francesco Sedita
- Cinematography: Russell Swanson
- Camera setup: Multi-camera
- Running time: 25 minutes
- Production companies: Tap That Maple; Penguin Random House; Matador Content; FremantleMedia Kids & Family Entertainment

Original release
- Network: Netflix
- Release: May 11, 2018

The Who Was? Show is a historical sketch comedy television series which ran for one season on Netflix, in which Andy Daly's character, Ron, interacts with a group of teenagers, interspersed with historical vignettes and narrated by H. Jon Benjamin. The show is based on the Who Was...? book series, published since 2002, and premiered on May 11, 2018. It was produced by Tap That Maple, Penguin Random House, Matador Content and FremantleMedia Kids & Family. The show was nominated for the Daytime Emmy Award for Outstanding Children's Series in 2019. One of the actors on the show, Zach Timson, confirmed that the show was canceled after one season on his TikTok page.

== Characters ==
- Andy Daly – Portrayed Ron, the fictional C.E.O. of the show
- Kirrilee Berger – Portrayed:
  - Joan of Arc
  - Amelia Earhart
  - Wilbur Wright
  - Many other minor characters
- Lilla Crawford – Portrayed:
  - William Shakespeare
  - Marie Antoinette
  - Susan B. Anthony
  - Orville Wright
  - Queen Elizabeth I
  - Christopher Columbus (Guest)
  - Many other minor characters
- Bentley Green – Portrayed:
  - Tutankhamun
  - Louis Armstrong
  - George Washington
  - George Washington Carver
  - Many other minor characters
- Adam Hochstetter – Portrayed:
  - Benjamin Franklin
  - Blackbeard
  - Galileo
  - Julius Caesar
  - Wolfgang Amadeus Mozart (Guest)
  - Many other minor characters
- Zach Timson – Portrayed:
  - Albert Einstein
  - Isaac Newton
  - Harry Houdini
  - Marco Polo
  - Pablo Picasso
  - Thomas Jefferson (Guest)
  - Henry VIII (Guest)
  - Alexander the Great (Guest)
  - Many other minor characters
- Haley Tju – Portrayed:
  - Mahatma Gandhi
  - Sacagawea
  - Frida Kahlo
  - Marie Curie
  - Genghis Khan
  - Many other minor characters
- Dallas Liu – Portrayed:
  - Bruce Lee (Dallas Liu)
    - (Appeared throughout the first season and Ron, as a running gag, insisted he be on the show, calling him "Brucie". He finally got to be in the season finale to fight Julius Caesar.)
- John Hodgman-Portrayed:
  - The Explanationator
    - (An animated superhero character who appeared in episodes 2, 8, and 11.)
- Brian McCann
  - Monsieur Tidbits
    - (An animated French dog who appeared in episodes 2, 3, 4, 5, and 13.)
  - Princess Tutbits
    - (An animated Egyptian sphinx (and cousin of Monsieur Tidbits) who appeared in episode 3.)

== Episodes ==
No.	Title	Directed by	Written by	Original release date
1	"Gandhi & Benjamin Franklin"	Stoney Sharp, Jared Lapidus & Daniel Beers	Brian McCann, Eric Gilliland, Elliott Kalan, Delaney Yeager, Brian Clark & Mark McAdam	May 11, 2018
Guest appearance by Adam Pally as Who Was Your Life Host Sketches: Benjamin Franklin and Thomas Jefferson write the Declaration of Independence (starring Adam as Benjamin and Zach as Thomas); The Ben Franklin Mandatory Kite Sketch; "Faces on Money" rap song; Gandhi peacefully protesting against Ron's Historical Dance-Off; Gandhi's "Vegetables" song; Gandhi on Who Was Your Life; Benjamin Franklin trying to make farts smell pleasant
2	"Albert Einstein & Joan of Arc"	Daniel Beers, Stoney Sharp & Jared Lapidus	Brian McCann, Eric Gilliland, Elliott Kalan, Delaney Yeager, Brian Clark, Mark McAdam & Aparna Nancherla	May 11, 2018
Sketches: Einstein's song "E = MC2"; Albert and Joan giving "Hot Hair Tips"; Joan of Arc sees angels and Archangel Michael acts like her boyfriend (starring Kirrilee as Joan and Bentley as Michael); Ron going to burn Joan of Arc at the stake, but Albert Einstein stops him
3	"William Shakespeare & King Tut"	Stoney Sharp, Jared Lapidus & Daniel Beers	Brian McCann, Eric Gilliland, Elliott Kalan, Delaney Yeager, Brian Clark & Mark McAdam	May 11, 2018
Sketches: William Shakespeare's father wants his son to be a glove maker, not a poet. Then the glove-making business crashes, resulting in William Shakespeare's father changing his mind and letting Shakespeare be a poet.; Tomb Fixers; Tut Talks; How to Make a Mummy; Queen Elizabeth trying to get in the ticket booth for a Shakespeare play.
4	"Isaac Newton & Amelia Earhart"	Stoney Sharp, Jared Lapidus & Daniel Beers	Brian McCann, Eric Gilliland, Elliott Kalan, Delaney Yeager, Brian Clark, Mark McAdam & Aparna Nancherla	May 11, 2018
Guest appearance by Ellie Kemper as herself/female narrator Sketches: Earhart replaces H. Jon Benjamin with Ellie Kemper as narrator; Isaac Newton's falling apple story; [Sir] Isaac Newton of Woolsthorpe was a genius who discovered gravity and loved the plague because for him it meant solitude.; Amelia Earhart goes to the all-men's air show for men and is inspired to become an aviator.
5	"Marie Antoinette & Louis Armstrong"	Stoney Sharp, Jared Lapidus & Daniel Beers	Brian McCann, Eric Gilliland, Elliott Kalan, Delaney Yeager, Brian Clark & Mark McAdam	May 11, 2018
Sketches: Keeping up with the Antoinettes; Jazz Slang; Marie Antoinette gets her head cut off; Keeping up with the Angry French Mob; What Went Wrong?
6	"Sacagawea & Blackbeard (Edward Teach)"	Stoney Sharp, Jared Lapidus & Daniel Beers	Brian McCann, Eric Gilliland, Elliott Kalan, Delaney Yeager, Brian Clark & Mark McAdam	May 11, 2018
Guest appearance by Jordan Klepper as Job Coach Sketches: Blackbeard finds a job as a pirate from the Job Coach and throws him off his ship.; The Job Coach travels a century from Blackbeard's time to Sacagawea's time.; Sacagawea finds a job to lead her husband and the Lewis and Clark Expedition through the United States to the Pacific Ocean from the Job Coach.; Blackbeard gives a tour of his pirate ship.; The Lewis and Clark Expedition; Arrrrr-bitrary pirate facts; "My Head's on a Pole" song
7	"Susan B. Anthony & Frida Kahlo"	Stoney Sharp, Jared Lapidus & Daniel Beers	Brian McCann, Eric Gilliland, Delaney Yeager, Brian Clark, Mark McAdam, Tami Sagher & Elliott Kalan	May 11, 2018
Sketches: Frida's Joy of Painting; Susan B. Anthony’s "Hey, That's Messed Up!" Song; Ye Bachelorette; Frida in bed with her doctor passing her the piece of the bus that got stuck in her; Frida drives her bed to her art museum
8	"Marie Curie & Harry Houdini"	Jared Lapidus & Daniel Beers	Brian McCann, Eric Gilliland, Elliott Kalan, Delaney Yeager, Brian Clark & Mark McAdam	May 11, 2018
Sketches: The Fast and the Curie-ous; Houdini's Metamorphosis; 2 Fast 2 Curie-ous; The Fate of the Curie-ous; Songs about Houdini (Including a song about how he died and caught the flu)
9	"George Washington & Marco Polo"	Stoney Sharp, Jared Lapidus & Daniel Beers	Brian McCann, Eric Gilliland, Elliott Kalan, Delaney Yeager, Brian Clark, Mark McAdam & Aparna Nancherla	May 11, 2018
Guest appearance by Sarah Vowell as herself Sketches: The Story of Marco Polo; Undercover General; The Who Was Show Roast of Marco Polo; George Washington’s "We Can Figure it Out!" song; Camels! Camels! Camels!
10	"Genghis Khan & George Washington Carver"	Stoney Sharp, Jared Lapidus & Daniel Beers	Brian McCann, Eric Gilliland, Elliott Kalan, Delaney Yeager, Brian Clark & Mark McAdam	May 11, 2018
Sketches: The Green Thumb; Li'l Genghis; "Peanut Soup"; Clan Clash (Genghis won)
11	"Pablo Picasso & The Wright Brothers"	Jared Lapidus & Daniel Beers	Brian McCann, Eric Gilliland, Elliott Kalan, Delaney Yeager, Brian Clark & Mark McAdam	May 11, 2018
Guest appearance by Jane Krakowski as herself (uncredited) Sketches: The Wright Brother's failures; The Less Talented Wright Brothers Who Didn't Invent The Airplane; Pablo Picasso gets into cubism; Cubism commercial
12	"Galileo & Queen Elizabeth"	Jared Lapidus, Daniel Beers & Stoney Sharp	Brian McCann, Eric Gilliland, Elliott Kalan, Delaney Yeager, Brian Clark & Mark McAdam	May 11, 2018
Guest appearance by Mark Cuban as himself Sketches: How Queen Elizabeth wears her clothes (with the help of her maids); Galileo’s “Dum-Dum” song; Young Queen Elizabeth in jail and talking to severed heads outside; Elizabeth's "It's So Crazy" song; Galileo teaching the audience about how the Earth revolves around the Sun, and getting arrested by the Pope at the end
13	"Julius Caesar & Bruce Lee"	Daniel Beers, Jared Lapidus & Paul Pennolino	Brian McCann, Eric Gilliland, Elliott Kalan, Delaney Yeager, Brian Clark & Mark McAdam	May 11, 2018
Guest appearance by John Oliver as himself Sketches: Julius Caesar taking over Who Headquarters; Julius Caesar accidentally crushes Bruce Lee with a big rock; "All Hail Caesar" song (Caesar's introduction); Widdle Julie; Bruce Lee's Kung-Fu Camera Tricks; Caesar Conquers the Last Week Tonight show and calls himself the God of TV; Bruce Lee teaching the audience about nunchucks and then a nun named Chuck comes in and smacks Bruce with a ruler; Episode ending with the fight between Bruce Lee and Julius Caesar (Results of the fight out in season 2, which never happened); During the interview, Bruce Lee said that sharing and Julius Caesar do not go together as Julius Caesar steals the name tags of all the famous people on the show.

== See also ==
- Histeria!
- History Bites
- Horrible Histories
