= A Tale of Magic... =

2019 fantasy novel by Chris Colfer

- Author: Chris Colfer
- Illustrator: Brandon Dorman
- Cover artist: Brandon Dorman
- Language: English
- Series: A Tale of Magic...
- Genre: Fantasy
- Publisher: Little, Brown and Company
- Publication place: United States
- Pages: 481 (paperback)
- ISBN: 978-0-316-52347-9
- Followed by: A Tale of Witchcraft...
- Website: thelandofstories.com/ataleofmagic

A Tale of Magic... is a 2019 fantasy novel written by Chris Colfer, creator of The Land of Stories series. The first novel in the A Tale of Magic... series and a prequel to The Land of Stories series, the book follows Brystal Evergreen, an oppressed young woman in the Southern Kingdom. One day, Brystal discovers she can perform magic, which is illegal in almost every kingdom, but Madame Weatherberry recognizes her talent and brings her to a school of magic, which is approved by King Champion of the Southern Kingdom.

First published on October 1, 2019, in the United States, the book debuted at number 1 on The New York Times Best Seller list, staying on the list for a total of 17 weeks. To promote the book, Colfer did a week-long book signing, visiting eight cities in the United States. The book earned positive reviews from critics, who praised the messages of acceptance and inclusion as well as the characters.

== Plot ==
In all four kingdoms, magic is outlawed; practitioners and those associated are usually punished with death. In the Southern Kingdom, a fairy named Madame Weatherberry requests King Champion's approval for a school of magic. She convinces him by saying magic is not bad but witchcraft is and that he could use magic to stop the "northern conflict". He eventually accepts, letting her recruit two children.

Women in the Southern Kingdom are stripped of all rights, including those related to reading, but 14-year-old Brystal Evergreen loves to do so and takes many risks. Later, Brystal becomes a maid at the library, wanting to read books. After many close calls, Brystal finds a "Justice-only" section of banned books where she learns of those who defied the Justices and were killed as a result. She finds a book on magic, discovering she can perform it, but is caught by the librarian and is sent to the Bootstrap Correctional Facility. Later, Madame Weatherberry arrives and recruits Brystal to her school. Along the way, Xanthous Hayfield, who specializes in fire and accidentally killed his father, and Emeralda Stone, who specializes in gems and was raised by dwarves in a cave, are recruited.

At Madame Weatherberry's school, they meet Tangerina Turkin and Skylene Lavenders, who are her apprentices. They are later joined by Lucy Goose who has a "specialty for trouble" and whom Brystal makes friends with. During classes, Brystal struggles to unlock her magic properly, leading to Madame Weatherberry giving her a wand. After Brystal is nearly killed, Madame Weatherberry decides to begin teaching protection classes and reveals to Brystal she has been leaving the school to fight the Snow Queen who has been causing blizzards in the Northern Kingdom. If Madame Weatherberry perishes, she wants Brystal to succeed her. Madame Weatherberry leaves again and, finally, Brystal tells the others what Madame Weatherberry is doing, and they set off to help her.

After they fall off a cliff, the group lands in a giant flower garden where they meet a girl named Rosette who leads them to her aunt, a sorceress. She explains being a witch or a fairy is a choice, differing from what Madame Weatherberry taught them. Using the "tree of truth", they find this to be true since Madame Weatherberry is trying to seek acceptance for the magical community by categorizing fairies as good and witches as bad. Finally, they arrive in the Northern Kingdom where they help the soldiers regain their strength and fight witches who are helping the Snow Queen. Brystal climbs to the top of the mountain and finds the Snow Queen to be Madame Weatherberry herself, who explains she has been angry all her life because of discrimination. Using her anger, she transformed into the Snow Queen, causing a magical problem which only fairies could solve. Brystal tells Madame Weatherberry to escape to the northern mountains, creating northern lights and sending occasional blizzards. When the northern lights disappear, this is a sign of the Snow Queen's return.

The fairies request magic be legalized, rights be equalized, and all laws restricting creative freedom be removed in return for them fixing the Snow Queen's damage. At the Celeste Weatherberry Memorial Academy of Magic, many fairies arrive, seeking to develop their magical abilities.

== Background ==
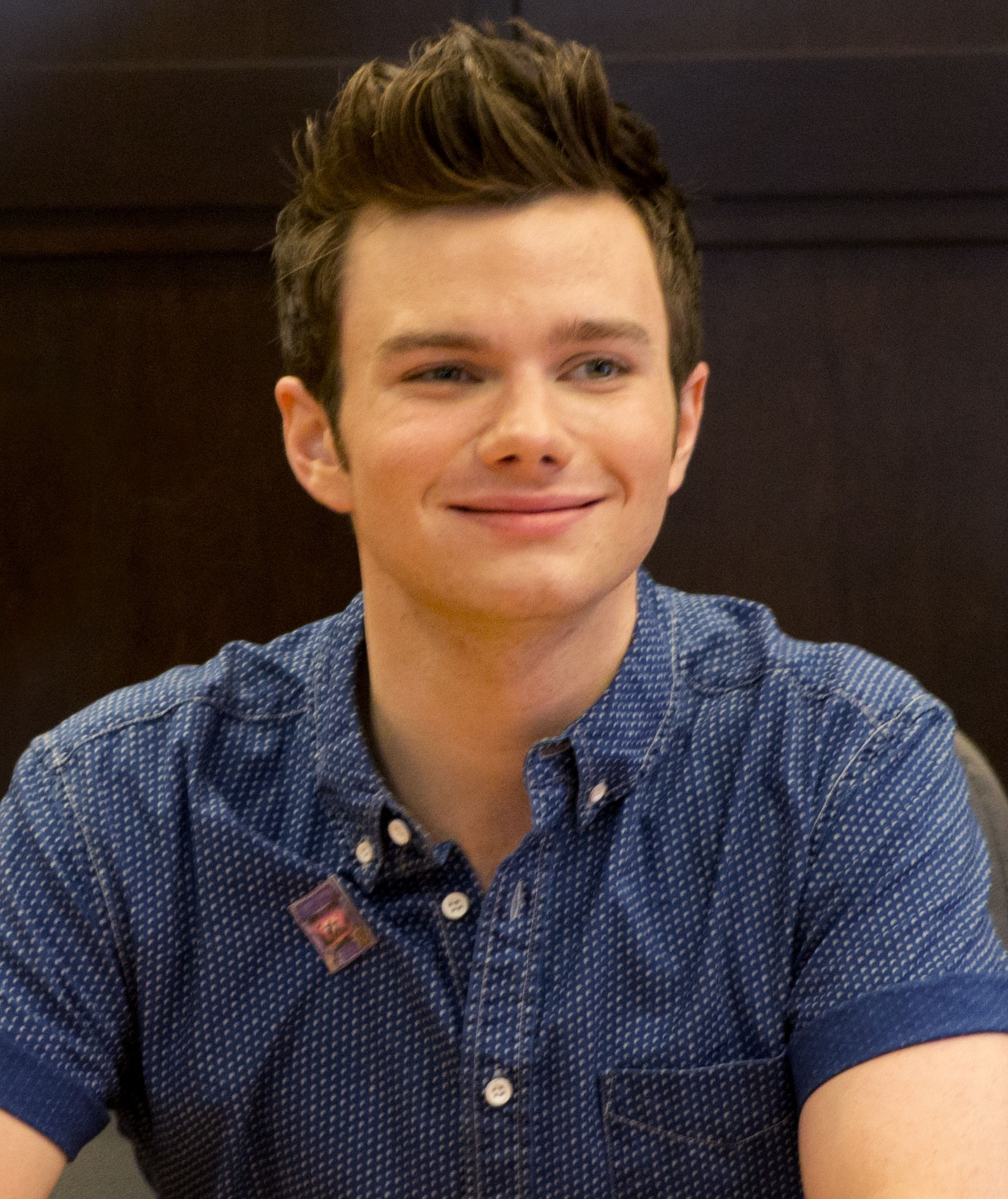
Colfer felt anger and helplessness from the state of the world when writing A Tale of Magic...

Colfer stated that A Tale of Magic... was meant to be a straightforward start of a prequel series with the working title The Land Before Stories. When he began to write it, he felt anger and helplessness from the world's condition. Instead, he wrote something he felt could set the next generation "on a better path", the book ceasing to be as much of a prequel as it was an original story.

=== Influences ===
A Tale of Magic... was primarily influenced by Colfer's trauma from the September 11 attacks, which happened when he was 11. While he was old enough to know what was happening, he did not know why it was occurring. The fact people are persecuted for being magical in the book is "an allegory for being gay". Colfer also was influenced by J. K. Rowling's novels. The end of the Harry Potter series inspired him to write his own books.

Colfer described the novel as his own "manifesto for compassion" and the "toughest book" he has ever written. He wanted to write a book which could give parents and teachers guidance when explaining troubling things to children while still giving them a "magical adventure". He thought young people should know there is still lots of love, even if one feels like they are not accepted or appreciated. Additionally, he believed fiction's purpose was to make people more reasonable and compassionate.

== Publication ==
The book was first published on October 1, 2019, by Little, Brown and Company. On October 20, the book debuted at number 1 on the Children's Middle Grade Hardcover The New York Times Best Seller list, staying atop the list for four consecutive weeks before dropping to number 3 on its fifth week. On its sixth week, the book rose to number 2 before dropping to number 6. On its 14th week, it rose to number 1 again. After its 17th week, the book dropped off the list.

== Promotion ==
In March 2019, the cover of the book was revealed by Entertainment Weekly. Colfer did a "traditional" tour to promote the book from October 1 to October 8 of the same year, doing book signings. He visited book stores in New York City; Northvale, New Jersey; Naperville, Illinois; Sykesville, Maryland; Decatur, Georgia; Frisco, Texas; Tempe, Arizona; and Los Angeles.

== Reception ==
Publishers Weekly noted its "focus on chosen family, accepting one's true self, and changing public perception through normalization" as well as Colfer's metaphors for marginalized experience, praising the characters and storyline. Mary Eisenhart of Common Sense Media gave the book four out of five stars for the characters' complexity, relatability and dealing with tragedies while facing dangers to attempt to make the world a more secure place for people who also have magic, and pep talks from Brystal. She complimented the themes of the book, though she stated violence was "pretty much everywhere". The book also received a Parents' Choice Gold Award in 2020.

== Sequels ==
A sequel titled A Tale of Witchcraft... was published on October 6, 2020, which also debuted on The New York Times Best Seller list, dropping off after its 17th week. A Tale of Sorcery... was published on September 28, 2021. Colfer is unsure if there will be a fourth installment, but as of October 2021, he said it is "very likely".
