= Minae Noji =

American actress

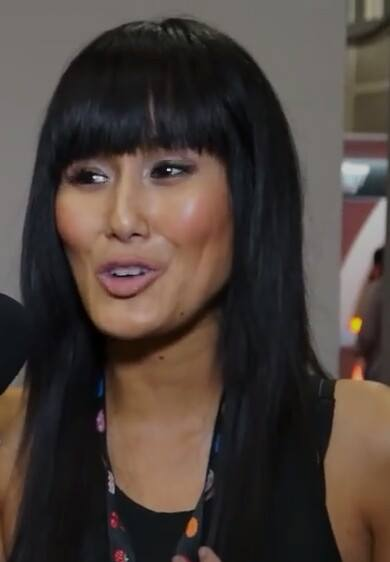
- Minae in 2014
- Occupation: Actress
- Years active: 1986–present

Minae Noji is an American actress. She is known for her roles as Karai in the 2014 Teenage Mutant Ninja Turtles film, Dr. Kelly Lee on General Hospital and has also been the voice behind Azami in the popular video game Tom Clancy's Rainbow Six Siege.

== Life and career ==
Minae Noji's father is an engineer and her mother is an accountant. She attended Mesa Robles Middle School and Glen A. Wilson High School in Hacienda Heights, California. She graduated from the University of California, Irvine with a bachelor's degree in sociology and music. She appeared on the soap opera General Hospital, where she played the role of Dr. Kelly Lee from 2006 to 2012.

== Filmography ==
=== Film ===
Year	Title	Role	Notes
2004	The Last Run	Fashion Consultant	
2005	Be Cool	Miss Bangkok	
2005	Memoirs of Geisha	Spring Festival Dancer	
2009	Bitch Slap	Kinki	
2013	Flu	Additional voices	Voice, as Stacy Okada
2014	No Tears for the Dead	Mo-geyoung	Voice, as Stacy Okada
2014	Teenage Mutant Ninja Turtles	Karai	
2014	Stand by Me Doraemon	Jaiko	Voice, English dub
2016	Kubo and the Two Strings	Minae	Voice
2016	I Know You're in There	Spirit	
2019	Eleven Eleven	Xi	
2019	The Creatress	Kate	

=== Television ===
Year	Title	Role	Notes
1986	The Judge	Susan Tang	Episode: "In Violation of Michael"
1986	Nothing Is Easy	Kim	Episode: "Betrothal"
1987	A Year in the Life	Tracy	Episode: "So Much Water So Close to Home"
1998	The Bold and the Beautiful	Susan	3 episodes
2001	Power Rangers Time Force	Saleslady	Episode: "The Last Race"
2001	Spin City	Tai Chi Instructor	Episode: "Sleeping with the Enemy"
2005	Doraemon	Little G	Voice, episode: "All the Way from the Future World"
2006–2017	General Hospital	Dr. Kelly Lee	234 episodes
2007	General Hospital: Night Shift	Dr. Kelly Lee	13 episodes
2012–13	Killer Karaoke	Narrator	8 episodes
2014	BoJack Horseman	Ayako	Voice, episode: "BoJack Hates the Troops"
2015	Robot Chicken	Masa, Nicki Mortgage, Daughter	Voice, episode: "Garbage Sushi"
2015–17	Teenage Mutant Ninja Turtles	Tang Shen, Alopex	2 episodes
2015–17	Star vs. the Forces of Evil	Brittney Wong, additional voices	4 episodes
2017	Jeff & Some Aliens	Additional voices	2 episodes
2017–2023	Miraculous: Tales of Ladybug & Cat Noir	Tomoe Tsurugi	Voice, 9 episodes
2019	Runaways	Tokiko Minoru	Episode: "Enter the Dreamland"
2019	Hot Streets	Crimson Dagger	Voice, episode: "The Moon Masters"
2020	Deathstroke: Knights & Dragons	Bora, Secretary of State	1 episode
2020	Mickey Mouse Mixed-Up Adventures	Singer Pop Star	1 episode
2022	How I Met Your Father	Realtor	1 episode
2022	Lupin the 3rd Part 6	Baby, Nicola, Tomoe	8 episodes
2022	It's Pony	Doris	1 episode
2023	Strong Girl Nam-soon	Secretary Jung Na-Young	16 episodes

=== Video games ===
Year	Title	Role	Notes	Source
2002	Emperor: Battle for Dune	Roma Atani		
2002	Earth & Beyond	Jenquai		
2008	Command & Conquer: Red Alert 3	Rocket Angel		
2011	Driver: San Francisco	Additional voices		
2011	Tales of Xillia	Milla Maxwell	Uncredited	
2011	X-Men: Destiny	Additional voices		
2011	Saints Row: The Third	Pedestrians		
2012	Sleeping Dogs	Rosa		
2012	Marvel Pinball: Avengers Chronicles	Madame Masque		
2013	Marvel Heroes	Lady Deathstrike		
2014	Earth Defense Force 2: Invaders from Planet Space	Additional Voices		
2015	Lord of Magna: Maiden Heaven			
2016	Paragon	Dekker		
2016	World of Warcraft: Legion	Wave Speaker, Adelee		
2016	Tales of Berseria	Milla Maxwell		
2017	Fire Emblem Heroes	Idunn		
2020	Ghost of Tsushima	Onibaba		
2022	Tom Clancy's Rainbow Six Siege	Azami	Demon Veil expansion	
2022	The Elder Scrolls Online	Luce Gemain	Firesong expansion	
2022	Call of Duty: Mobile	Sparrowhawk		
2023	Diablo IV	Additional Voices		
2024	Like A Dragon: Infinite Wealth	Kaoru Sayama, additional voices		
2024	Final Fantasy VII Rebirth	Additional Voices		
2025	Like a Dragon: Pirate Yakuza in Hawaii	Additional Voices		
2026	Yakuza Kiwami 3 & Dark Ties	Kaoru Sayama	English dub for Kiwami 3	
2026	Grand Theft Auto VI	The Local Population		
