= Chris Colfer =

American actor, singer, and author (born 1990)

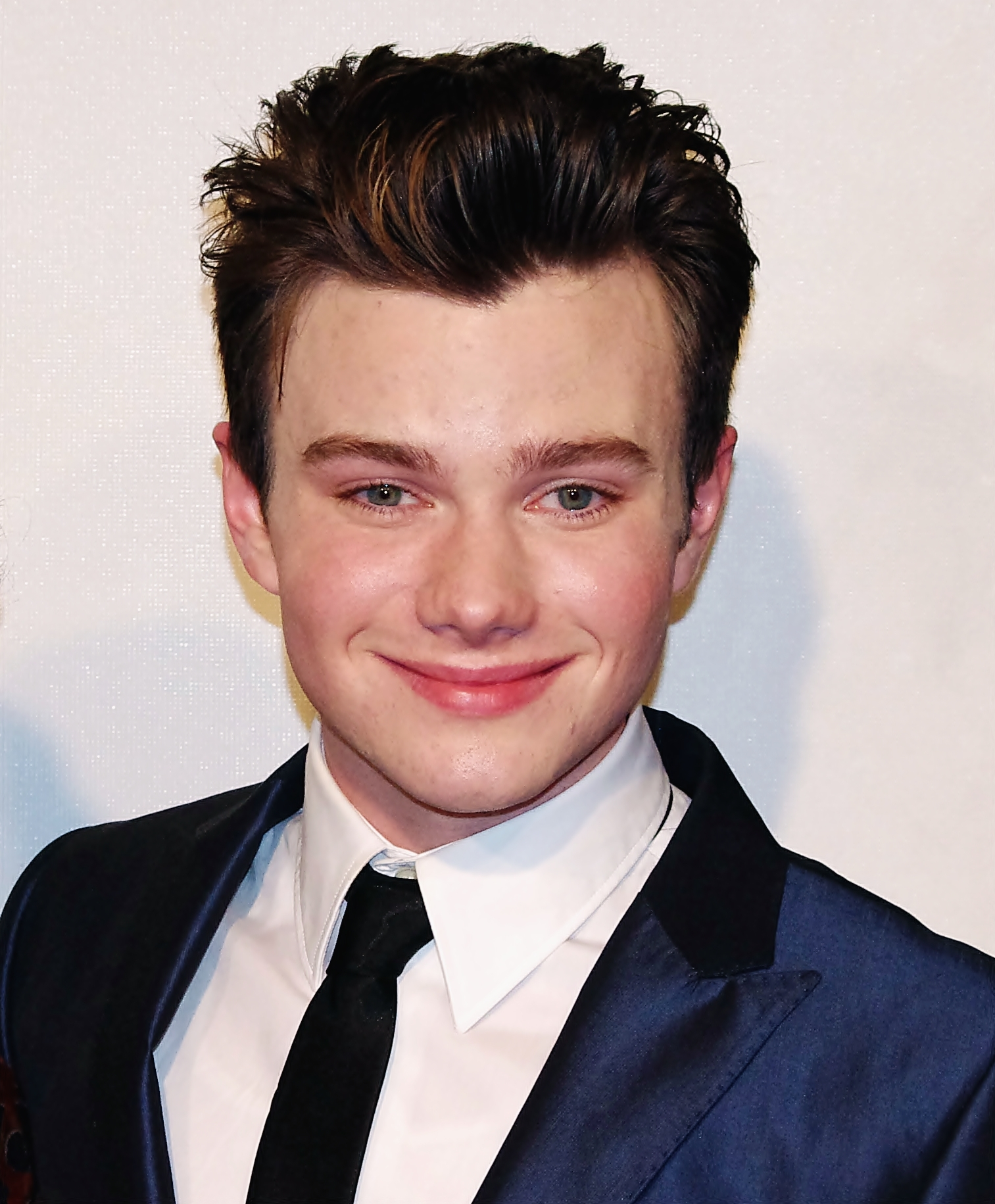
- Chris Colfer at the 2012 Tribeca Film Festival
- Born: Christopher Paul Colfer; May 27, 1990 (age 36); Clovis, California, U.S.
- Occupations: Actor; singer; writer
- Years active: 2008–present
- Partner: Will Sherrod (2013–present)

Christopher Paul Colfer (born May 27, 1990) is an American actor, singer, and author. He gained international recognition for his portrayal of Kurt Hummel on the television musical Glee (2009–2015). Colfer's portrayal of Kurt received critical praise and won him several awards, including the 2011 Golden Globe Award for Best Supporting Actor in a Series, Miniseries or Television Film, three consecutive People's Choice Awards for Favorite Comedic TV Actor from 2013 to 2015, two Primetime Emmy Awards for Outstanding Supporting Actor in a Comedy Series nominations and one Grammy Award nomination. In April 2011, Colfer was named one of the Time 100, Time's list of the 100 most influential people in the world.

Colfer wrote, starred in, produced, and novelized his first film, Struck by Lightning, which debuted at the 2012 Tribeca Film Festival. He also wrote The New York Times bestselling The Land of Stories series of children's fiction books, starting with The Land of Stories: The Wishing Spell. As of September 2025, he has published twenty-one books.

== Early life and education ==
Colfer was born in Clovis, California, to Karyn and Timothy Colfer. He is of Irish ancestry and has stated: "I'm very Irish, my family is all Irish and Saint Patrick's Day in my house is crazy." As a child, he was confined to a hospital bed for three months following a lymph node surgery, which left a scar on his neck and which he credits as one of the difficult experiences that made him interested in fictional worlds.

When Colfer was seven, his younger sister was diagnosed with severe epilepsy; he said, "She'd have these horrid, horrid epileptic fits in the middle of the night." He "craved attention" from his parents, but it was diverted to his sister's health. He knew he wanted to be an actor, but as a coping mechanism he retreated into his imagination and began writing fairy tales.

At an early age, Colfer showed a passion for writing. He was "born wanting to be a storyteller", using both writing and acting as ways to entertain people and escape reality. His grandmother was his first editor, advising and encouraging him in elementary school when he first attempted to write a fairytale-inspired novel, which would later become The Land of Stories. In 2012, Colfer dedicated his first published novel to her, and quoted her: "Christopher, I think you should wait until you're done with elementary school before worrying about being a failed writer."

Colfer was bullied so severely in middle school that he needed to be homeschooled for half of 7th grade and 8th grade. When he attended Clovis East High School, he was involved with the speech and debate program, and he won "champion titles", including placing ninth in the State Competition for Dramatic Interpretation. He was also active in the drama club, the FFA, "was president of the Writer's Club, editor of the school's literary magazine, and captain of Destination ImagiNation". As a high school senior, he wrote, starred in, and directed a spoof of Sweeney Todd entitled Shirley Todd, in which all of the roles were gender-reversed. One of his real in-school experiences was later turned into a subplot for his character on Glee, when the high school teachers denied him the chance to sing "Defying Gravity" from the musical Wicked because it is traditionally sung by a woman.

== Career ==
The first show Colfer acted in was a community theatre production of West Side Story. He then appeared in The Sound of Music as Kurt von Trapp at Good Company Players, which later inspired the naming of his Glee character.

At age 18, Colfer starred as Russel Fish in Russel Fish: The Sausage and Eggs Incident, a short film in which an awkward teenager must pass a Presidential Physical Fitness test or fail gym class and lose his admission to Harvard University.

=== Glee ===
Colfer's first TV role came in 2009 when he was cast as Kurt Hummel on Fox's Glee. Kurt is a fashionable gay countertenor who is routinely bullied at school for his sexuality and participating in the very unpopular Glee Club. Colfer auditioned for the part of Artie Abrams, who uses a wheelchair, a role which eventually went to Kevin McHale.

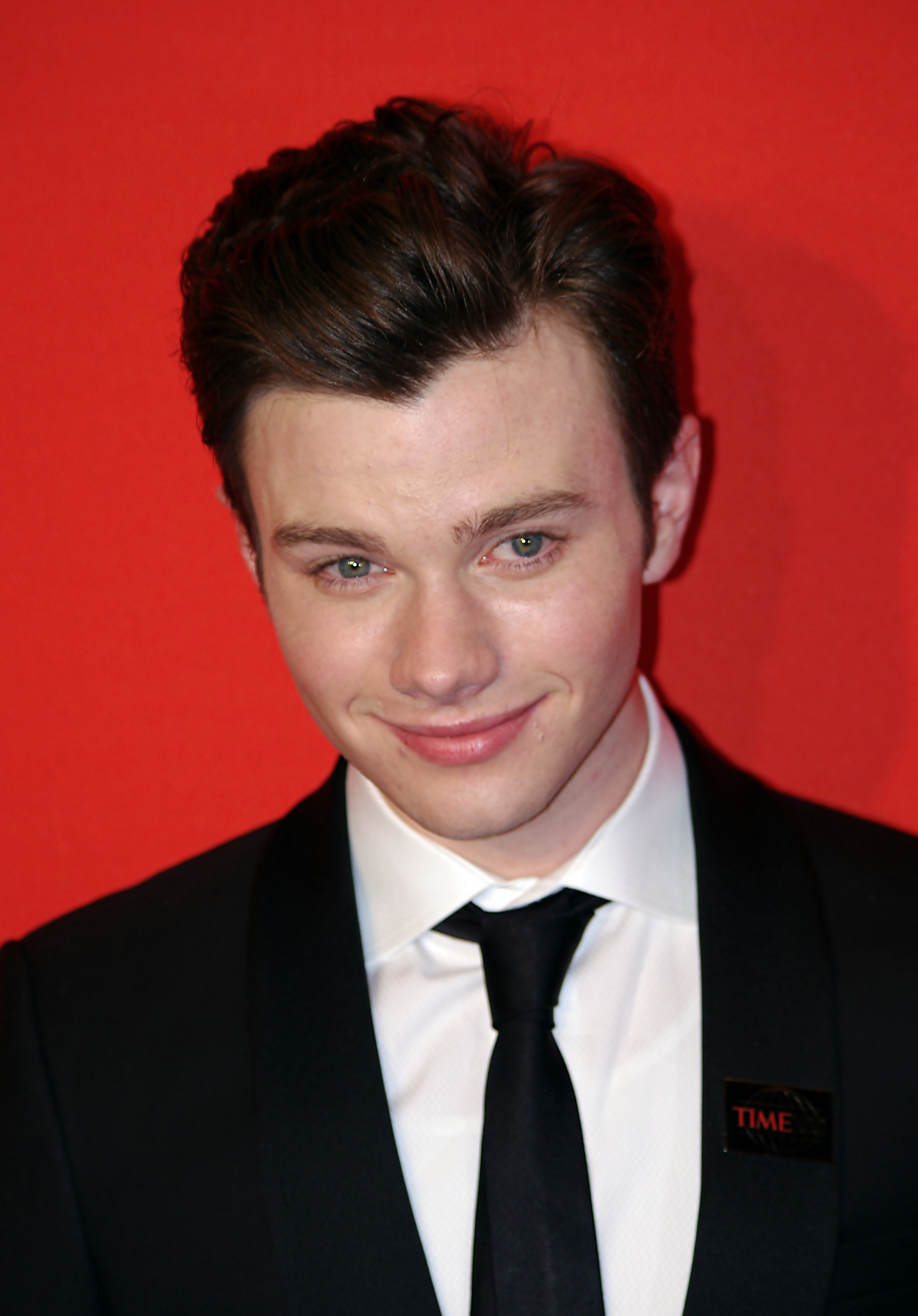
Colfer at the Time 100 Gala in April 2011

The show's creator, Ryan Murphy, was so impressed with Colfer that he created the role of Kurt specifically for him, and in the process, scrapped a planned character called Rajish so they could add Kurt. Murphy explained in the season two finale of The Glee Project that Colfer was the inspiration for the project show because he did not fit the role he auditioned for but was still "incredible and special" so a role was created for him.

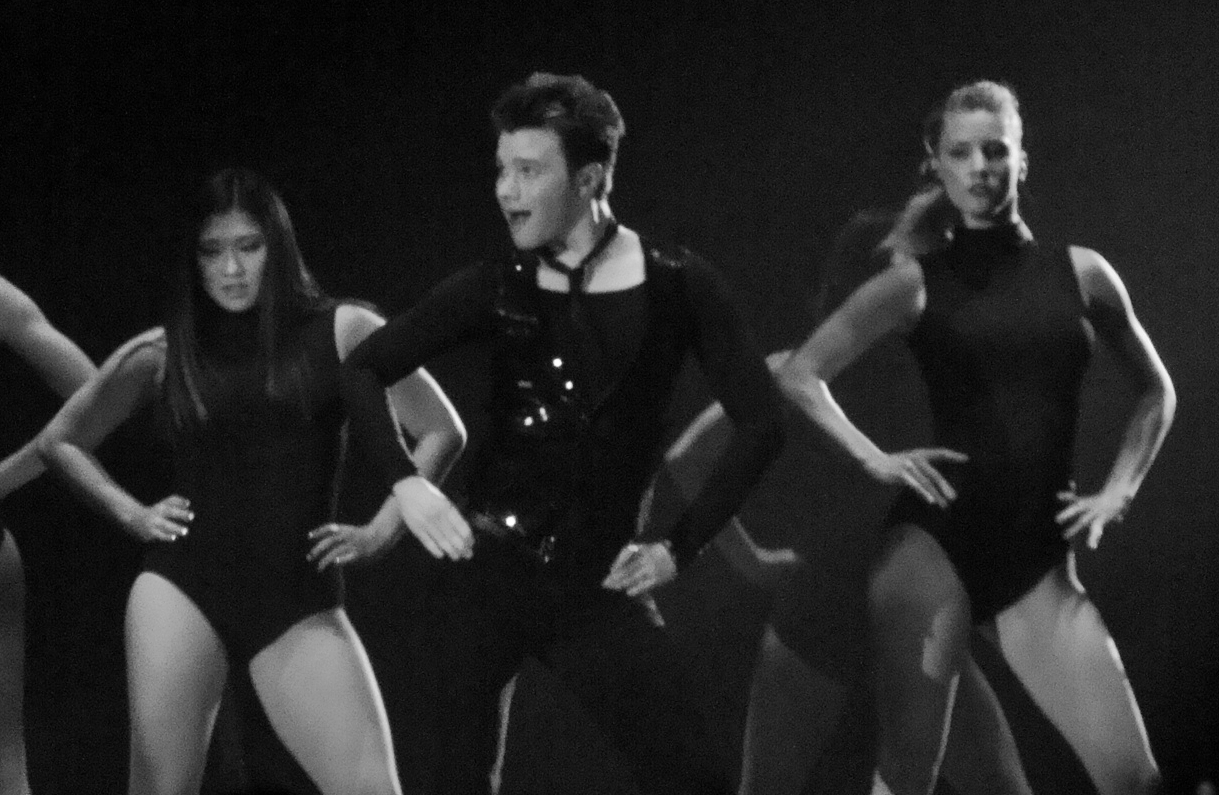
Jenna Ushkowitz, Colfer and Heather Morris during a performance of "Single Ladies" on the tour Glee Live! In Concert! in 2011

In a 2010 interview with Allison Kugel, Colfer stated that:

There have been a couple of times when I have gone to Ryan Murphy and told him a couple of things that have happened to me, and then he writes it into the show. Or he'll ask me what song I would want to sing, in this situation or in that situation. I don't think any of us directly try to give input on the character or on the storyline, but they definitely steal things from us.

Colfer won the 2011 Golden Globe for Best Supporting Actor in a Television Series for his performance as Kurt Hummel. In his emotional acceptance speech, he thanked Ryan Murphy for being his "fairy godfather" and dedicated the award to kids who have been bullied and told "they can't [...] have what they want because of who they are." He was twice nominated for an Emmy Award in the Outstanding Supporting Actor in a Comedy Series category for his portrayal of Kurt.

In 2013 and 2014, Colfer won consecutive People's Choice Awards for Favorite Comedic TV Actor. Both speeches he gave were praised by the media for being funny while making references to things like fanfiction and fanart to show his appreciation for fan culture.

=== The Land of Stories ===
On June 8, 2011, Colfer signed a book deal with Little, Brown and Company to write two novels for children. The first book in the series, The Land of Stories: The Wishing Spell, was released on July 17, 2012. The books are about Conner and Alex Bailey, twins, who get their grandma's story book and go through adventures in "The Land of Stories". For two weeks after the book's release, it was number one on The New York Times Best Seller list in the Children's Chapter Books category.

The second book in the series, The Land of Stories: The Enchantress Returns (2013) debuted at number two on The New York Times Best Seller list, and by the end of 2013, it had spent eleven weeks in the top fifteen for Children's Middle Grade books. Following the success of the first two books, Colfer contracted for an additional three books with Little, Brown: two novels and a picture book.

The third book in the series, The Land of Stories: A Grimm Warning, was released on July 8, 2014. Now considered a series, it reached No. 4 on The New York Times Best Seller list and spent four weeks on the list.

Colfer's fourth novel, The Land of Stories: Beyond the Kingdoms, was released on July 7, 2015. Following its release, The Land of Stories charted at No. 1 as a series on The New York Times Best Seller list for the first time on July 26.

The picture book, written by Colfer and illustrated by Brandon Dorman, The Curvy Tree was released in October 2015 and is based on a short original fairy tale of the same name, which Colfer first told in The Land of Stories: The Wishing Spell.

The fifth book in the series, The Land of Stories: An Author's Odyssey, was released on July 12, 2016. The sixth and final installment, The Land of Stories: Worlds Collide was released on July 11, 2017.

In June 2017, it was announced that Colfer would make his directorial debut with a film adaptation of The Land of Stories: The Wishing Spell. He would also write the script and serve as one of the executive producers on the project. In July 2025, Deadline confirmed that Warner Bros Pictures had acquired the rights, with Phil Johnston adapting the series.

=== Other works ===
Colfer wrote, starred in, executive-produced, and novelized the coming-of-age comedy film Struck by Lightning. The plot revolves around Colfer's character, who is struck and killed by a bolt of lightning, and chronicles his exploits as he blackmails his fellow senior classmates into contributing to a literary magazine he is publishing. It was shot during the Glee hiatus in the summer of 2011 and had its world premiere in 2012 at the Tribeca Film Festival.

The film received generally negative review from critics, earning a 33% approval rating on Rotten Tomatoes based on 33 reviews. Critics praised aspects of the film's humor and writing but criticized its underdeveloped characters and lack of narrative depth.

In March 2012, Colfer was featured in a performance of Dustin Lance Black's play, 8 – a staged reenactment of the federal trial that overturned California's Prop 8 ban on same-sex marriage – as Ryan Kendall. The production was held at the Wilshire Ebell Theatre and broadcast on YouTube to raise money for the American Foundation for Equal Rights.

Colfer landed a deal with the Disney Channel to adapt the book The Little Leftover Witch for a television pilot. He also wrote another movie, set in an asylum, which he planned to appear in as a supporting actor. However, both of these projects were delayed with no expected dates for production.

On January 28, 2014, Colfer was annouced as the voice of the title character in Robodog , a 3D CG computer animated family film by Marza Animation Planet. The film, which will costar Ron Perlman, is described as "a classic, heart-warming adventure story about an unlikely duo who couldn't be more different." The film's director, Henry F. Anderson III, said Colfer is "perfect" for the project because he "has an appealing, youthful voice which fits right in with our lead character, KC, who is above all a charismatic entertainer." Vocal recording for the film began on February 1, 2014. The film is now in post-production, though as of 2019 no release date has been set.

After a few months of planning, it was revealed in March 2014, that Colfer had been asked by Glee's producers to write an episode. About the offer, Colfer said: "I've been asked in interviews if I ever wanted to write [an episode of Glee], and I said, 'Absolutely not because it was not my world.' I didn't want to tamper with someone else's image. Then they were like, 'Here, come tamper.'" The title of the episode, which aired in May 2014, is "Old Dog, New Tricks".

In 2014, Colfer guest starred on an episode of Hot in Cleveland as Tony, Victoria's son. In March 2015, Jane Leeves posted an image on Twitter confirming that Colfer would be returning to an episode titled "All About Elka" in the show's final season. Colfer, other guest star Carol Burnett and Betty White all sang and performed in a "musical" being directed by Victoria (Wendie Malick).

On May 14, 2015, it was made public that the biopic Colfer has been mentioning for almost a year was going to be about Noël Coward with the working title Noel, with Colfer in the title role. Colfer prepared for the role in London. The film would be directed by Joe Stephenson. While filming was expected to begin sometime during the summer of 2015, it has been delayed.

In 2016, he played Christopher in Absolutely Fabulous: The Movie. He had been offered the role by Jennifer Saunders after he invited her to the Glee: Live tour in 2011. He also appeared as a guest judge in Chopped Junior.

In 2017, Colfer announced he would develop a new TV show called Indigo, a sci-fi drama about indigo children who are misdiagnosed as having mental or physical illnesses, when they really possess supernatural abilities. TV Line reported that Indigo would be offered for sale to streaming services and television networks, with Colfer writing and directing the pilot episode, and co-executive producing with Keith Quinn and Rob Weisbach.

Colfer starred as Boyd in a horror film titled The Restoration at Grayson Manor, which premiered in 2025.

=== Other books ===
In 2012, Colfer released a companion book to his film Struck by Lightning, called Struck By Lightning: The Carson Phillips Journal.

In early 2017, Colfer released his second book for young adult readers called Stranger Than Fanfiction. The book follows the story of Cash Carter, a world-famous television star who decides to take a cross-country road trip with four of his biggest fans, as they are getting ready to enter college.

On October 1, 2019, Colfer came out with a new book, A Tale of Magic.... It is a prequel to the Land of Stories series. The sequel, A Tale of Witchcraft..., was published on September 29, 2020, with the final part, A Tale of Sorcery... published on September 28, 2021.

Colfer's new projects include a series of children's books with space and UFOs as a theme. The first book, Roswell Johnson Saves the World, was published on June 4, 2024.

== Personal life ==
In an interview with Chelsea Handler in December 2009, Colfer stated that he is gay. He has been in a relationship with actor and producer Will Sherrod since 2013.

Colfer appeared on the British chat show Friday Night with Jonathan Ross in June 2010, together with his fellow Glee co-stars Amber Riley and Matthew Morrison. He demonstrated his skill with a pair of sai, revealing that he bought a pair on eBay and regularly practices in his trailer. He also mentioned that he would like it if his sai could be worked into an episode of Glee; they first appeared in the season 3 episode "I Am Unicorn", during Colfer's character Kurt Hummel's performance of "I'm the Greatest Star" from the musical Funny Girl.

During the 2022 Los Angeles mayoral election, Colfer endorsed Democratic candidate Karen Bass (who would later be elected) and donated to her campaign.

=== Philanthropy ===
Colfer is an active supporter of the It Gets Better campaign and The Trevor Project, creating an It Gets Better video after the Glee episode "Never Been Kissed" aired; he dedicated his 2011 Golden Globe Award to bullied kids in LGBTQ communities.

In 2013, Colfer filmed a public service announcement (PSA) with Elmo about anti-bullying for Sesame Street in Communities, and participated in the Course of the Force run benefiting the Make-A-Wish Foundation. In 2014, he participated in a PSA about Let Girls Learn, put out by the U.S. Agency for International Development. On Hollywood Game Night, hosted by Glee co-star Jane Lynch, Colfer won $6,000 and donated it to the Make-a-Wish Foundation of America.

Colfer was a co-chair for the Elton John AIDS Foundation Academy Award Party in 2013 and 2014. He is a coalition member of Uprising of Love, an organization which supports the safety and dignity of Lesbian, Gay, Bisexual, Transgender, and Intersex (LGBTI) Russians.

== Filmography ==
=== Film ===
Year	Title	Role	Notes
2009	Russel Fish: The Sausage and Eggs Incident	Russel Fish	Short film
2010	Marmaduke	Drama Dog No. 2	Voice
2011	Glee: The 3D Concert Movie	Kurt Hummel	
2012	Struck by Lightning	Carson Phillips	Also writer and executive producer
2016	Absolutely Fabulous: The Movie	Christopher	
2025	The Restoration at Grayson Manor	Boyd	
TBA	The Potters	Asher Potter	Pre-production

=== Television ===
Year	Title	Role	Notes
2009–2010	Entertainment Tonight	Himself	
2009–2015	Glee	Kurt Hummel	Main role; 116 episodes Also writer on "Old Dog, New Tricks"
2011	The Cleveland Show	Kurt Hummel	Voice
2011	Saturday Night Live	Himself	
2012	8	Ryan Kendall	TV movie
2012	The Glee Project	Himself	Guest mentor
2012–2014	The Talk	Himself	
2013	Bitter Party of Five	Himself	
2014	Hollywood Game Night	Himself	1 episode
2014, 2015	Hot in Cleveland	Tony Chase	Episodes: "Straight Out of Cleveland", "All About Elka"
2017	Julie's Greenroom	Himself	Episode: "The Write Stuff!"
2018	RuPaul's Drag Race: All Stars	Himself	Episode: "My Best Squirrelfriend's Dragsmaids Wedding Trip"
2020	Visible: Out On Television	Himself	Episode: "The New Guard"
2021	Ridley Jones	Kosy	Episode: "Dinner with Ismat"

== Bibliography ==
=== The Land of Stories series ===
- The Wishing Spell (2012)
- The Enchantress Returns (2013)
- A Grimm Warning (2014)
- Beyond the Kingdoms (2015)
- An Author's Odyssey (2016)
- Worlds Collide (2017)

Companion books

- The Mother Goose Diaries (2015)
- Queen Red Riding Hood's Guide to Royalty (2015)
- The Curvy Tree (2015)
- A Treasury of Classic Fairy Tales (2016)
- Trollbella Throws a Party (2017)
- The Ultimate Book Hugger's Guide (2018)
- Goldilocks: Wanted Dead or Alive (2021)

=== A Tale of Magic... series ===
- A Tale of Magic... (2019)
- A Tale of Witchcraft... (2020)
- A Tale of Sorcery... (2021)

=== Roswell Johnson series ===
- Roswell Johnson Saves the World (2024)
- Roswell Johnson Saves the Galaxy (2025)

=== Standalone novels ===
- Struck by Lightning: The Carson Phillips Journal (2012)
- Stranger Than Fanfiction (2017)

== Awards and nominations ==
Year	Award	Category	Work	Result
2009	Satellite Awards	Best Actor in a Supporting Role in a Series, Mini-Series or Motion Picture Made for Television	Glee	Nominated
2010	Primetime Emmy Awards	Outstanding Supporting Actor in a Comedy Series	Glee	Nominated
2010	Satellite Awards	Outstanding Supporting Actor in a Comedy Series	Glee	Nominated
2010	Screen Actors Guild Awards	Outstanding Performance by an Ensemble in a Comedy Series	Glee	Won
2010	Teen Choice Awards	Choice TV: Male Scene Stealer	Glee	Won
2011	Golden Globe Award	Best Performance by an Actor in a Supporting Role in a Series	Glee	Won
2011	Monte-Carlo TV Festival	Outstanding Actor – Comedy Series	Glee	Won
2011	Primetime Emmy Awards	Outstanding Supporting Actor in a Comedy Series	Glee	Nominated
2011	Grammy Awards	Best Pop Performance by a Duo or Group with Vocals	"Don't Stop Believin' (Regionals version)" (Note: Shared with Cory Monteith, Lea Michele, Chris Colfer, Kevin McHale, Jenna Ushkowitz, Mark Salling and Naya Rivera)	Nominated
2011	Screen Actors Guild Awards	Outstanding Performance by a Male Actor in a Comedy Series	Glee	Nominated
2011	Screen Actors Guild Awards	Outstanding Performance by an Ensemble in a Comedy Series	Glee	Nominated
2011	Teen Choice Awards	Choice TV: Male Scene Stealer	Glee	Nominated
2011	Teen Choice Awards	Fashion Icon: Male	Himself	Nominated
2012	People's Choice Awards	Favorite TV Comedy Actor	Himself	Nominated
2012	Screen Actors Guild Awards	Outstanding Performance by an Ensemble in a Comedy Series	Glee	Nominated
2012	Teen Choice Awards	Choice TV Actor: Comedy	Glee	Won
2012	Teen Choice Awards	Fashion Icon: Male	Himself	Nominated
2013	People's Choice Awards	Favorite TV Comedy Actor	Himself	Won
2013	Screen Actors Guild Awards	Outstanding Performance by an Ensemble in a Comedy Series	Glee	Nominated
2013	Teen Choice Awards	Choice TV Actor: Comedy	Glee	Nominated
2014	People's Choice Awards	Favorite Comedic TV Actor	Himself	Won
2015	People's Choice Awards	Favorite Comedic TV Actor	Himself	Won
2015	Shorty Awards	Best Author	Author of The Land of Stories	Nominated
2015	Teen Choice Awards	Choice TV Actor: Comedy	Glee	Nominated
2019	Destination Imagination	DI Icon Award	Himself	Won
