= Bitch Slap =

2009 action and exploitation film directed by Rick Jacobson

- Theatrical release poster
- Directed by: Rick Jacobson
- Written by: Rick Jacobson; Eric Gruendemann
- Produced by: Eric Gruendemann; Rick Jacobson
- Starring: Julia Voth; Erin Cummings; America Olivo; Ron Melendez; William Gregory Lee; Minae Noji; Michael Hurst
- Cinematography: Stuart Asbjornsen
- Edited by: Joe McFadden; Corey Yaktus
- Music by: John R. Graham
- Production company: Epic Slap
- Distributed by: Freestyle Releasing; IM Global; Summit Entertainment
- Release date: September 14, 2009 (Toronto International Film Festival)
- Running time: 109 minutes
- Country: United States
- Language: English
- Box office: $514,537

Bitch Slap (alternate title: Before Me We Say I Do) is a 2009 American action film directed by Rick Jacobson and starring Julia Voth, Erin Cummings, America Olivo and Michael Hurst, with cameos by Lucy Lawless, Kevin Sorbo, and Renee O'Connor.

== Plot ==
Three attractive and voluptuous vixens, a down-and-out stripper named Trixie, a drug-running killer and ex-convict named Camero, and a corporate powerbroker nicknamed Hel, arrive at a remote desert hideaway to extort massive riches from a ruthless sword-wielding killer named Pinky, who is also a notorious underworld figure. None of the three women are who they appear to be: each has an ulterior motive.

They kidnap a gangster called Gage and try to force him to reveal where the treasure is buried. He refuses, believing they will kill him anyway, but Hel promises he will not be harmed. Camero shoots and kills him, against the wishes of Hel, saying she made no such promise. His phone rings, and they believe Gage is connected to Pinky.

Things become more complicated when a police officer named Deputy Fuchs arrives. Unknown to them, he was in the audience five nights ago when Trixie performed as a stripper to seduce Gage. However, the three women hide the body and are able to convince Fuchs to leave. While digging for the treasure, Camero asks the girls about the best sex each has ever had, believing the answer tells her something important about their character. She admits her best sex ever was with a circus contortionist, although she did not even know the contortionist's name at the time.

During a water fight, Trixie falls onto something in the sand. They dig; however, instead of buried treasure they find the dead body of one of Hel's contacts. Trixie goes into the trailer to collect herself as Hel follows her to check on her, only for Trixie to seduce Hel into making out and going second-base with her, which leads to them having vigorous sex until Camero catches them in the act and is furious, as she apparently is in love with Hel too. They are interrupted by Hot Wire and his girlfriend Kinki, whom Camero is familiar with. At gunpoint, the two abuse the women and force them to dig for the buried treasure. Deputy Fuchs returns just as they discover the location of an underground bunker, He attempts to save the women, but instead causes a gunfight, which Hel ends with a high-powered machine gun found earlier in the nearby trailer.

Camero asks the meaning of the code Hel uses on the bunker access keypad, "75650". At closer inspection it appears that the number 1 is associated with the letter A, 2 with BCD, 3 with E, 4 is with FGH, 5 is with IJK, 6 is with LMN, 7 is with OPQ, 8 is with RST, 9 is with UVW and 0 is with XYZ. With this info the code numbers spell "PINKY" Hel and Trixie find the hidden bunker full of goods stolen from Pinky, including a mysterious weapon, diamonds, and a beautiful sword, which Trixie takes. Camero, believing she is in the midst of a double-cross, fights Hel for the diamonds. Camero overcomes Hel and sets Trixie afire along with barrels of flammable liquids. Camero leaves Hel in chains while she attempts to drive away with the diamonds; however, Hel quickly uses the super-machine gun to free herself, and fires a rocket that destroys the car Camero was driving.

Hel admits to Trixie that she is a secret agent who reports to a man named Phoenix, and that she is on a mission to retrieve the weapon they found in Pinky's lair. Camero returns and again fights Hel. After she beats Hel to the ground, Camero assumes she is dead and moves to kill Trixie. As Trixie will not fight back, Camero tries to rape her, but stops when she sees a tattoo and realizes Trixie was the shadowy contortionist from her past. Before she can kill Trixie, Camero is shot in the back and killed by Deputy Fuchs, who managed to survive the explosion. However, instead of thanking him, Trixie kills Fuchs using a hidden throwing star. Hel awakens, having survived Camero's attack. Trixie then reveals that she, in fact, is Pinky, and concocted the entire plot to retrieve the sword she took from Gage's bunker, which he had taken from her six months previously.

== Cast ==
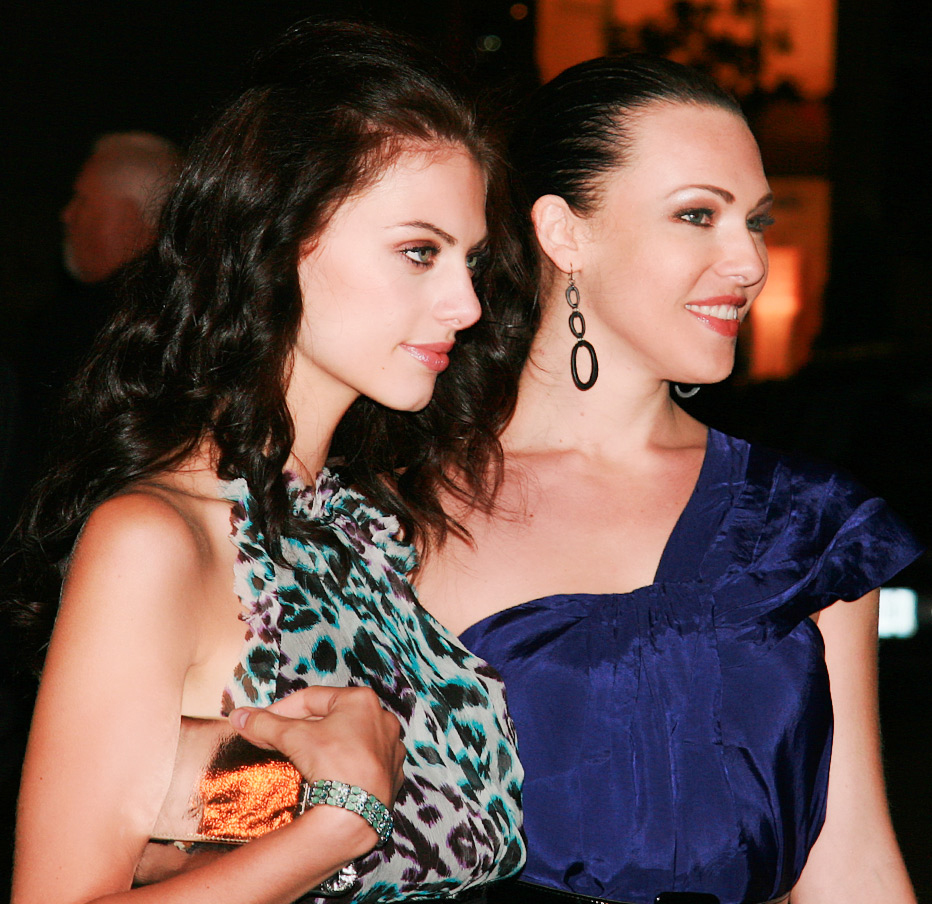
Voth and Cummings at the 2009 Toronto International Film Festival

- Julia Voth as Trixie
- Erin Cummings as Hel
- America Olivo as Camero, and Sister Prudence Bangtail
- Michael Hurst as Gage
- Ron Melendez as Deputy Fuchs
- William Gregory Lee as "Hot Wire"
- Minae Noji as "Kinki"
- Scott Hanley as "Black Ice"
- Kevin Sorbo as Mr. Phoenix
- Dennis Keiffer as MacDaddy
- Lucy Lawless as Mother Superior
- Renee O'Connor as Sister Batril
- Mark Lutz as Deiter Von Vondervon
- Debbie Lee Carrington as "Hot Pocket"
- Zoë Bell as "Rawhide"
- Brian Peck as Wrong Place - Wrong Time

== Music ==
John R. Graham composed the musical score and the soundtrack was released in 2009; featuring 29 songs. The film also features songs by AM Conspiracy, Rebel Vengeance and Eagles of Death Metal.

== Release ==
The film was released in the United States on January 8, 2010, in theaters and video-on-demand. It received a limited run of three weeks in three theaters and closed January 21.

The film grossed $17,365 at the domestic (US and Canada) box office and $199,436 foreign.

=== Home media ===
An unrated DVD was released on March 2, 2010, in the United States.

=== Critical response ===
On review aggregator Rotten Tomatoes, the film holds an approval rating of 29% based on 17 reviews, with an average rating of 4.55/10. On Metacritic, the film has a weighted average score of 19 out of 100, based on 5 critics, indicating "overwhelming dislike".

In Daily Variety, IM Global's Stuart Ford described Bitch Slap as "a pure exploitation pic — chicks, boobs, guns and bad guys, in that order". In Variety, Joe Leydon wrote "Overblown and underwhelming, 'Bitch Slap' is a desperately unfunny attempt to satirically recycle cliches and archetypes from sexploitation actioners of the 1960s and '70s." Amy Biancolli of the San Francisco Chronicle wrote "The idea is to amuse anyone who's not offended by all the over-baked violence, bad acting and slapping babeage, but it's so heavy-handed and hyper-stylized that any extant wit gets smacked into submission. It's just not any fun." Mark Olsen in the Los Angeles Times noted that, "Despite its obsession with décolletage, Bitch Slap is surprisingly puritanical (much teasing, no pleasing)."

== Inspiration ==
The film is described as "a post-modern, thinking man's throwback to the 'B' Movie/Exploitation films of the 1950s–70s as well as a loving, sly parody of the same". The film is inspired by the Dragstrip Girl, Faster, Pussycat! Kill! Kill!, Kung Fu Nun, the pantheon of blaxploitation and other exploitation films which had a renewal in popularity after the cult success of Grindhouse in 2007.
