= The Land of Stories =

Book series by Chris Colfer

- Cover of the first book in the series
- Original series: The Wishing Spell (2012); The Enchantress Returns (2013); A Grimm Warning (2014); Beyond the Kingdoms (2015); An Author's Odyssey (2016); Worlds Collide (2017); Prequels: The Mother Goose Diaries (2015); A Tale of Magic... (2019); A Tale of Witchcraft... (2020); A Tale of Sorcery... (2021)
- Author: Chris Colfer
- Illustrator: Brandon Dorman
- Country: United States
- Language: English
- Genre: Children's fiction, adventure and fantasy
- Publisher: Little, Brown Books for Young Readers
- Published: 2012–present
- Media type: Print (hardcover and paperback), audiobook, e-book
- No. of books: 10

The Land of Stories is a series of children's fiction, adventure, and fantasy books written by American author, actor, and singer Chris Colfer. The first book, The Wishing Spell, was released on July 17, 2012, with the sixth and final book published in July 2017. Colfer started plans for a prequel series in 2016, and has since published three books in this series, beginning with A Tale of Magic... in 2019.

Described by Colfer as a "modern-day fairy tale", the series follows twins Conner and Alex Bailey as they enter a world of fairy tales and discover that there is more to this world than meets the eye.

== Books ==
=== The Wishing Spell ===
The first book in the series, The Wishing Spell, was published in July 2012.

It has been eleven months since twins Alex and Conner Bailey lost their father in a car accident, a month before their eleventh birthday. Since then, their mother has been trying to balance her job with caring for her family. On their twelfth birthday, their grandmother gives them an old book of fairy tales from her childhood, which Alex decides to keep despite Conner telling her to throw it away. After she accidentally enters the book, Conner also enters because she and him fell in it. Upon arriving in the fairy-tale world, they meet Froggy, a man turned into a frog from a witch and asks them questions and is who gives them a journal from a man who loved a women in the Otherworld, that tells of the Wishing Spell and it's ingredients: a spell that can grant a person's wish if they have eight specific items. Hoping to return to the Otherworld, Alex and Conner set out to find the items needed for the Wishing Spell. Along the way, they meet various fairy tale characters from stories that their father had told them, including the Huntress, the daughter of the Huntsman. She works for the Evil Queen, who also seeks to use the Wishing Spell which they learn can only be used twice, and that man who wrote the journal already used it. After the stories their father made up and they saw them, they later conclude that their father is from the fairy-tale world.

After Alex and Conner get all the items needed for the Wishing Spell, the Big Bad Wolf Pack kidnaps them, and goes to the Evil Queens lair, which is located north of the Sleeping Kingdom. There, Conner tries to prevent the Evil Queen from using the Wishing Spell by smashing the fairy tear bottle, one of the items needed for it. The Evil Queen reveals that she was once Evly, a kind and caring girl who fell in love with a young boy named Mira, but the Enchantress captured her and prevented her from marrying him. Evly tried to send secret messages to Mira, but the Enchantress found out and imprisoned Mira in a mirror. Evly later killed the Enchantress, but was unable to bring Mira back until she found out about the Wishing Spell. The Evil Queen saw that Alex is a fairy in the mirror of truth she uses one of Alex's tears to replace the fairy tear bottle and activates the Wishing Spell. Mira is freed from the magic mirror, but soon after, dies in her arms, and the mirror falls and swallowed them up into her magic mirror as her lair collapses. In the ensuing battle, the Huntsman and his daughter are killed, and Alex and Conner are rescued. Froggy is revealed to be the long-lost Prince Charlie of the Charming Kingdom, and Alex and Conner learn that their grandmother is the Fairy Godmother, who can create portals between the Otherworld, and the fairy-tale world, and that the journal was written by their father, making them part fairy. Alex and Conner return to the real world.

=== The Enchantress Returns ===
The Enchantress Returns is the second book in the series and was published in August 2013.

Alex comes home from school and finds that Conner is worried because Charlotte has not come home from work and because he found a romantic note from her co-worker, a surgeon named Dr. Bob. who works with her at the hospital. She later confirms that he is her boyfriend after she returns home from work. Dr. Bob later comes to their house and tells them that he plans to propose to her, which they agree to because it would make them happy. They decide to surprise Charlotte with a special dinner, but she does not show up on time despite another nurse at the hospital saying that she had left two hours ago. They then hear a knock at the door and several soldiers from the Charming Kingdom enter along with the Fairy Godmother, who informs them that Charlotte has been kidnapped. While she attends to her business, Xanthous, a member of the Fairy Council, and Sir Lampton, an old friend of their father, watch over them until Mother Goose, their grandmother's closest friend, takes over babysitting. Alex later gives her alcohol until she becomes drunk and asks her for information, which she unknowingly gives.

Alex discovers that Charlotte was captured by Ezmia, also known as the Enchantress, who cursed Sleeping Beauty when she was a baby, and that the Sleeping Kingdom has fallen into ruin. Since she cannot enter the Land of Stories through the book, she and Conner instead enter it through a glowing painting at their grandmother's house, which also functions as a portal. Upon returning to the Land of Stories, they reunite with Froggy, who has returned to his frog form as a disguise, and they travel to the Red Riding Hood Kingdom, where Ezmia has destroyed several historical landmarks. Alex and Conner then sneak into a meeting for kings and queens, where Ezmia captures their grandmother and reveals that she tried to capture Alex, but instead captured Charlotte after she pretended to be Alex. At Red's castle, Conner learns of the Wand of Wonderment, which makes its wielder invincible and can only be created from the most valuable possessions of the six most hated people in the world. To find the items, Red asks the villagers to help her build a flying ship out of her baskets.

After the ship is completed, Alex, Conner, Red, Froggy, Goldilocks, and Jack set out to obtain the six items, including the Snow Queen's ice scepter, Cinderella's stepmother's wedding ring, the giant's harp, the glass from the Evil Queen's mirror, and the Sea Witch's jewels, but they do not know what Ezmia's most prized possession is. After landing in troll and goblin territory, they discover that Trollbella, a female troll that likes Conner, is now queen and that Bob has also traveled to the Land of Stories. In the Eastern Kingdom, they meet the ghost of Old Queen Beauty, who tells them that Ezmia's most prized possession is her pride.

Ezmia uses vines to drag Conner, Red, Froggy, Goldilocks, and Jack into the coliseum, where Alex attempts to defeat her by stealing her pride, but is knocked off of the coliseum. The Wand of Wonderment saves her from dying, but she is knocked unconscious and meets Alice, Lucy, Dorothy, and Wendy in her dreams, where they give her advice. Upon awakening, she returns to the coliseum on a flying horse. Ezmia attempts to kill her, but Rumpelstiltskin sacrifices himself to save her out of guilt for what he has tried to do for Ezmia. Conner destroys the Wand, which drains the magic from Ezmia's body, and she dies. Afterwards, Bob proposes to Charlotte and they get married in Queen Cinderella's castle, where she thanks Charlotte for taking care of their baby. When it is time to leave, Alex claims that she is meant to stay in the Land of Stories and that Conner should share their stories in the real world. The twins believe that they will be separated forever after the fairies decide to seal all portals leading to and from The Land of Stories. Conner has Cinderella's stepmother and stepsisters return him to the Otherworld, where he shares their stories.

=== A Grimm Warning ===
A Grimm Warning is the third book in the series and was published in July 2014.

Alex has been crowned Fairy Godmother, while Conner is at school and being questioned about her whereabouts. He goes on a school trip to Germany to hear previously unheard stories from the Brothers Grimm that were unearthed from a time capsule. While the girl he has a crush on, Bree Campbell, is going on the trip, four rude girls known as the Book Huggers are also going. Alex struggles to master spells and falls in love with farm boy Rook Robins. While their grandmother is dying, she has entrusted Alex with her duties and knows that the fairy tale world is in good hands.

Conner learns that one of the stories is a secret message and a warning for the Land of Stories. He sets out across Germany to crack a 200-year code, and with the help of Bree and Mother Goose's guidance, he eventually meets Emmerich Himmelsbach, a boy from a small village. Alex and Conner realize that time-displaced soldiers of the Grande Armée, led by General Jacques Du Marquis with help from the Masked Man, a prisoner whom he freed during a raid on the Pinocchio Prison, are attacking the Otherworld. After attacking some villagers, the army blackmails Alex's crush Rook into revealing the location of her and the royal families. The Masked Man betrays General Marquis by burning him with his dragon. Alex's grandmother, the Fairy Godmother, defeats the Masked Man's dragon with her fairy magic and "returns to magic", dying. Alex, hurt by Rook's betrayal, decides to break up with him. She later encounters the Masked Man without his mask and becomes convinced that he is their deceased father, John Bailey.

=== Beyond the Kingdoms ===
Beyond the Kingdoms is the fourth book in the series and was published in July 2015.

The twins are pursuing the Masked Man, who Alex believes is their late father, John, but Conner is unconvinced. Alex has been struggling to control her emotions and powers, causing her to attack others, including her family and friends. She also insists to the Fairy Council that dealing with the Masked Man should be one of their highest priorities. As a result, she is removed from her position as Fairy Godmother and from the Fairy Council. After attacking the Fairy Council, Alex flees and arrives at the Giant's castle, where Mother Goose is staying.

Morina the witch, who cursed Froggy to become a frog, arrives at Red and Froggy's wedding claiming to be Froggy's first lover and threatens to curse Red if he does not leave with her. Meanwhile, Conner goes to the library to get the wedding rings for Red and Froggy, where the Masked Man attacks him while attempting to steal books. That night, Alex wishes to talk with her late grandmother, who sends an "angel moth from outer space" of memories from the stars to tell her the truth about the Masked Man: he is their uncle Lloyd.

Conner's friend, the fairy Trix, steals a book from his grandmother, from which they learn that what Lloyd attempted to steal was a Portal Potion, which can transport anyone into any work of fiction. The ingredients for the potion are a branch from the oldest tree in the woods, a feather from the finest pheasant in the sky, a liquefied lock and key from a loved one, two weeks of moonlight, and a spark of magic. Alex then explains to the others that the Masked Man is their uncle, and Mother Goose tells them that it was their grandmother's dying wish that she not tell them this. The group then travels into several works of literature to stop Lloyd before he recruits an army of literary villains. As they pursue him through the lands of Oz, Neverland, and Wonderland, in Wonderland Lloyd sends them into a trap and traps them in different stories: Alex in the world of King Arthur, and Conner in the world of Robin Hood. After escaping and reuniting in Oz, they realize that Lloyd has sent armies to destroy the kingdoms and decide to enter Conner's short stories to recruit their own army.

=== An Author's Odyssey ===
An Author's Odyssey is the fifth book in the series and was published in December 2015.

Conner, Alex, and their friends enter the worlds of Conner's short stories to recruit allies that can help them fight back against the Masked Man and his reign of terror, including worlds of pirates and pyramids. Meanwhile, the Sea Witch and the Snow Queen, along with the witches of Dead Man's Creek, plan to use dust made from a magic mirror that demons created. The dust caused the Enchantress's temper and heartache, and they believe it will also work on Alex. Morina attacks Alex as she heads for the bathroom and throws the dust in her face. Meanwhile, Lloyd attacks Conner and his friends and forces them to give him a blood transfusion from Emmerich, who is revealed to be his son. Conner defeats Lloyd by trapping him in one of Bree's stories, but then learns that Alex has disappeared.

=== Worlds Collide ===
Worlds Collide is the sixth and final book in the series and was released in July 2017.

Conner, now 80 years old, celebrates his birthday at a bookstore. He then returns home and goes upstairs to find a collection of books he wrote about their adventures. He picks up the sixth and final book and begins to read in order to remember what happened. Alex, still under the witches' control, wreaks havoc at the New York Public Library; after learning of this, Conner heads to New York City along with Red, Jack, Goldilocks, and Bree. As Conner's group attempts to reach the library, a homeless man named Rusty, who had helped them earlier, leads them to a subway tunnel that was abandoned in the 1920s that runs underneath the library. While there, they hear from other homeless people and realize that a portal between the worlds will soon open in the library. They break into the library and see Alex, who is under Morina's control. While sleeping, Conner receives a message from Alex that she wants him to kill her so that she can "return to magic" and be free of the curse.

The Book Huggers rescue Conner and his friends, while the Fairy Council and other heroes battle the witches and villains, but Alex continues to wreak havoc. After the Literary Army is defeated, Conner writes a special story where they never have entered the Land of Stories and their father was still alive. Seeing her father again broke the curse and the old Alex is back. They then repair New York with healing flames, and a week later meet with President Katherine Walker, telling her that the book that leads to the Land of Stories must be protected to prevent future catastrophes. The series ends 65 years later as Conner, now 80 years old, prepares to move into a retirement home. His granddaughter, Charlotte "Charlie" Black, visits him on his way to visit Alex and then to the Land of Stories. The series ends with Charlie hearing a noise and going to the attic where she sees the Land of Stories book glowing. After all that has happened, Alex and Conner are finally reunited.

== Companion books ==
- The Mother Goose Diaries (2015)
- Queen Red Riding Hood's Guide to Royalty (2015)
- A Treasury of Classic Fairy Tales (2016)
- The Ultimate Book Hugger's Guide (2018)
- Goldilocks: Wanted Dead or Alive (2021)

=== Picture books ===
- The Curvy Tree (2015)
- Trollbella Throws A Party (2017)

=== Prequel series ===
- A Tale of Magic... (2019)
- A Tale of Witchcraft... (2020)
- A Tale of Sorcery... (2021)

== Development ==
Colfer recorded his audiobook himself. The Land of Stories: The Wishing Spell has been translated into several languages, including Albanian, Spanish, Japanese, Russian, Italian, French, Hebrew, Greek, Portuguese (Brazil), and Dutch. Later on, Colfer wrote a prequel trilogy, starting with the novel A Tale of Magic, about the Fairy Godmother's childhood.

== Characters ==
=== Heroes ===
- Alex Bailey is Conner's twin sister, who is intelligent, studious, and curious and often gets full marks in class. She is considered to be the teacher's pet, but does not have many friends. She is one of the most powerful fairies they have ever known, and often struggles to control her power. She is also the reason that she and Conner enter the Land of Stories, as her attempts to investigate the book lead to her accidentally being transported into it.
- Conner Bailey is Alex's twin brother, who, unlike her, is lazy and often falls asleep in class. He is sociable, but feels constantly overshadowed by her talent. He dislikes his teacher, Mrs. Peters, but she later inspires him to become a writer and in An Author's Odyssey, he travels into his short stories. In Worlds Collide, it is revealed that he and Bree married and had children together and that he became a successful author.
- Charlie "Froggy" Charming is a large humanoid frog who helps the twins in their adventures. He was formerly known as Prince Charlie Charming until the witch Morina cursed him because of his vanity and because she believed that he ended their relationship because of her appearance. At first, he is ashamed of being a frog and lives alone in the dwarf forests, but is later elected king of the Center Kingdom. In Beyond the Kingdoms, he is imprisoned in a magic mirror to protect Red, and in Worlds Collide he is freed after performing a good deed and marries her soon after.
- Red Riding Hood is the queen of the Red Riding Hood Kingdom. She can be snarky, self-centered, and clueless, but is also compassionate, loyal, and courageous. She was once in love with Jack, but he rejects her in favor of Goldilocks. Though initially repulsed by the fact that he is a frog, she eventually falls in love with Froggy after learning that he was once a prince.
- Jack is a man who grew a beanstalk when he was younger. Despite Red's affection towards him, he rejects her and falls in love with Goldilocks. Because of his love for her, he decides to join her on the run, regardless of the consequences.
- Goldilocks is a tough and fearless criminal who raids kingdoms. Jack joins her on the run when they fall in love.
- Fairy Godmother ("Grandma") is Alex and Conner's grandmother and the leader of the Fairy Council, who is the only one who can create portals between the fairy-tale world and the Otherworld.
- Mother Goose is a member of the Fairy Council, and, like the Fairy Godmother, can travel between worlds. She is accompanied by her pet gander, Lester, and likes to read nursery rhymes to children around the world.
- Bree Campbell is Conner's classmate, who first appears in A Grimm Warning. She is a horror writer. Conner has a crush on Bree, and at the end of A Grimm Warning, Bree reveals that she returns his feelings.
- Emmerich Himmelsbach is a boy from Hohenschwangau, Germany, who is around ten years old. He first appears in A Grimm Warning, where he helps Conner and Bree get into Neuschwanstein Castle and joins Conner on his adventure to save the Land of Stories. In Beyond the Kingdoms, he is revealed to be the son of Bo Peep and Lloyd Bailey, making him the twins' cousin.
- Rook Robins is a farmer's son and Alex's love interest in A Grimm Warning, though they break up after he betrays her when the army blackmails him into revealing the location of Alex and the royal families. He dies in Worlds Collide after shielding her from a sniper's bullet.

=== Villains ===
- Evly, the Evil Queen is Snow White's stepmother, whom the fairy tale world believed to be vain and power-hungry, but in reality she sought to free her lover, Mira, from her magic mirror after Ezmia, the Enchantress, imprisoned him in it. After the battle at her palace in The Wishing Spell, she is trapped in the mirror and wanders the mirror realm in hopes of finding Mira. She is released from the mirror realm after offering words of wisdom to a woman whose self-esteem was shattered because of her looks.
- Ezmia, the Enchantress was a young girl who lived in the Otherworld after the death of her parents and the destruction of her village. After she killed the soldiers who had tried to kill her, the Fairy Godmother chose her as the next Fairy Godmother. However, bitterness toward those who had failed her as well as the other fairies' jealousy caused her to renounce her title and turn to dark magic. The witches later used the dust to curse her to hate everyone, leading her to attempt to destroy the world. However, Alex stops her plans and defeats her.
- The Snow Queen is a blind weather witch who, long ago, secretly plotted against the king of the Northern Kingdom, whom she had befriended by granting him wishes and making prophecies. She overthrew the king and covered the kingdom in an eternal winter, but Prince White, Snow White's grandfather, defeated her and banished her to the Northern Mountains.
- Morina is a witch who cursed Froggy and turned him into a frog because of his vanity and her bitterness that he ended their relationship, and later trapped him in the magic mirror.
- The Masked Man/Lloyd Bailey is the main antagonist of the series from A Grimm Warning onward. A Grimm Warning reveals that he is Little Bo Peep's lover. Beyond the Kingdoms reveals that he is Alex and Conner's uncle Lloyd, and An Author's Odyssey reveals that Emmerich Himmelsbach is his son, whom he had with Little Bo Peep. He aims to recruit an army of literary villains in order to overthrow the Kingdoms and take over the world. He dies at the end of An Author's Odyssey.

== Reception ==
The Wishing Spell was on the New York Times Bestseller List for five weeks, and reached No. 1 for two of the five. In addition, The Onion's The A.V. Club gave The Wishing Spell a B., and the book was named one of Barnes & Noble's "Best Books of 2012".

== Film adaptation ==
By 2017, 20th Century Fox was developing a film adaptation of the first book, The Wishing Spell, with Colfer directing and writing the screenplay. Colfer was attached to serve as one of the executive producers on the film, and was to be produced by 21 Laps Entertainment.

In July 2025, it was reported that Warner Bros. Pictures had acquired the rights to the franchise, and a film adaptation is in the works. Colfer will produce the film alongside Emma Watts, who purchased the rights. Phil Johnston is set to write the screenplay.
