= Erin Cummings =

American actress

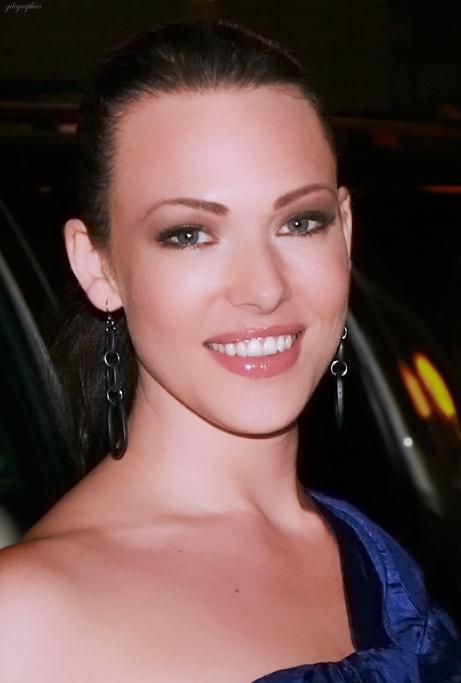
- Cummings at TIFF in 2009
- Born: Texas
- Education: University of North Texas
- Occupation: Actress
- Years active: 2003–present
- Spouse: Tom Degnan (m. 2016)
- Children: 2

Erin Cummings is an American actress and online film pundit. She has appeared in the television series, Charmed, Dante's Cove, The Bold and the Beautiful, Cold Case, Dollhouse, Spartacus: Blood and Sand, and Detroit 1-8-7.

== Early life ==
Cummings was born in Texas. Her father was in the military, and Erin lived in South Korea, Nebraska, and various areas of Louisiana, later growing up in Huntsville, Texas. She graduated from Huntsville High School, and attended Kilgore College in Kilgore, Texas, from 1995 to 1997 after auditioning and being selected for the Kilgore College Rangerettes dance team. After Kilgore, Cummings attended the University of North Texas, graduating with a degree in journalism. She also studied Shakespeare at the London Academy of Music and Dramatic Art.

== Career ==
Cummings portrayed Erin Ward in Detroit 1-8-7, Michelle in the television drama Dante's Cove. She has had minor roles in TV shows such as Charmed, Passions and Star Trek: Enterprise.

Cummings starred as Sura, the wife of Spartacus, in the Starz series Spartacus: Blood and Sand. Muscle & Fitness magazine featured Cummings in an article and pictorial for their February 2010 issue. In 2013 Erin portrayed Donna Adams in the Primary Stages production of Harbor.

Outside of acting, she regularly guests on The John Campea Show as a pundit bringing her industry knowledge and experience to the show. Cummings also produces her own podcast Kappa Kappa Cancer: Your Guide to the Sorority You Never Wanted to Join focused on her journey as a cancer survivor.

== Personal life ==
In November 2010, Cummings founded Mittens for Detroit, a community initiative that collects and distributes new gloves and mittens to children and adults in that city.

On September 9, 2016, shortly after marrying actor Tom Degnan, Cummings announced that she had been diagnosed with invasive ductal carcinoma—an aggressive form of breast cancer—and had begun treatment at UCLA. Cummings went through chemotherapy, a double mastectomy, and was cancer-free as of 2019.

== Filmography ==
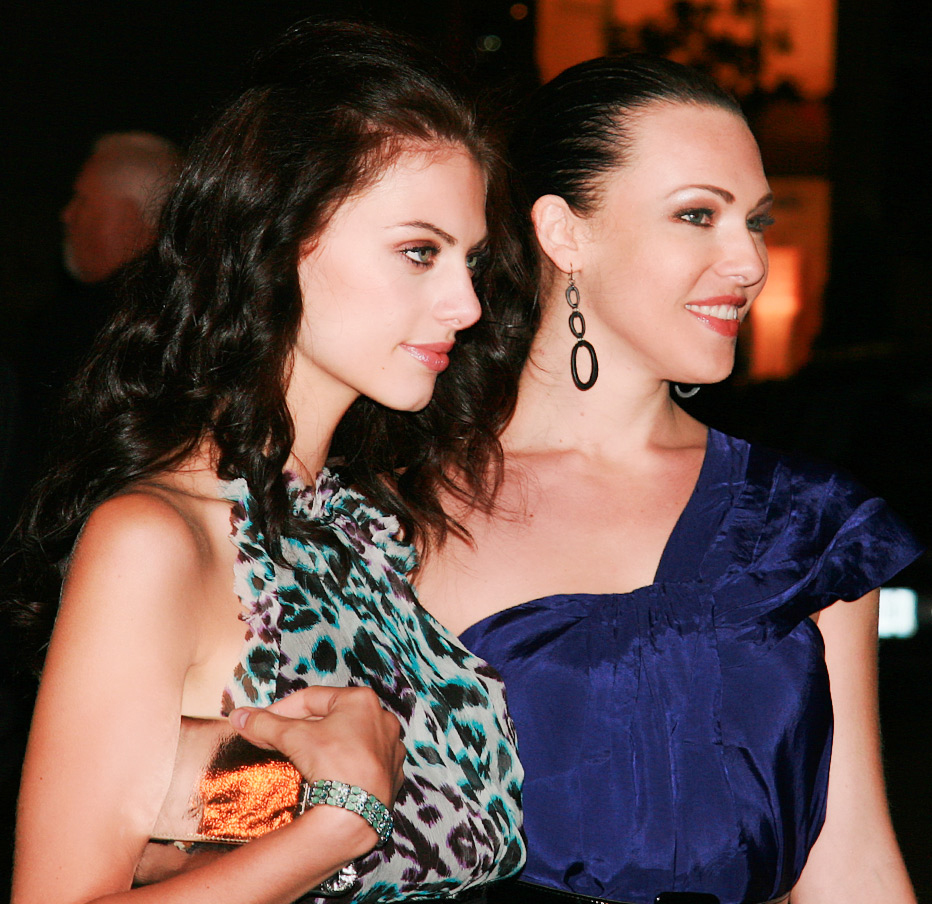
Cummings (right) with Julia Voth at the TIFF premier of Bitch Slap in 2009

Film
Year	Title	Role	Notes
2003	The Analysts	Noelle	Short film
2004	Hollywood the Hard Way	Tori Welsh	Short film
2004	Golf Cart Driving School	Death by Golf Cart – Dog Walker	Short film
2006	Tomorrow's Yesterday	Janice	Short film
2007	Rolling	Lexa	
2007	A New Tomorrow	Madonna	
2008	Welcome Home Roscoe Jenkins	Sally	
2008	Oh Baby!	Caroline	
2009	The Anniversary	Eve	
2009	Dark House	Paula	
2009	Bitch Slap	Hel	
2010	Scorpio Men on Prozac	Anne	
2011	Darla	Stacey Johnson	Short film
2011	Fruit of Labor	Eva	Short film
2013	The Iceman	Ellen	
2013	Zarra's Law	Crystal	
2013	Cold Comes the Night	Amber	
2014	Late Phases	Anne	
2015	Weepah Way for Now	Susan	
2017	The Disaster Artist	Restaurant Manager	Uncredited
2021	King Richard	Social Worker	

Television
Year	Title	Role	Notes
2003	Star Trek: Enterprise	Prostitute #1	Episode: "Carpenter Street"
2005	Passions	Roadhouse Woman #2	Episode: "1.1555"
2005	Threshold	Jen	Episode: "Pulse"
2006	Charmed	Patra	Episode: "Repo Manor"
2006	After Midnight: Life Behind Bars	Crystal	TV film
2006	Dante's Cove	Michelle	5 episodes
2007	The Bold and the Beautiful	Ann Lloyd	
2008	Cold Case	Rita Flynn	Episode: "Pin Up Girl"
2009	Dollhouse	Attendant	3 episodes
2009	Nip/Tuck	Jessie	Episode: "Benny Nilsson"
2010	Spartacus: Blood and Sand	Sura	Recurring role, 7 episodes
2010	Mad Men	Candace	Episode: "Public Relations"; Episode: "The Good News"
2010–11	Detroit 1-8-7	Dr. Abbey Ward	Main role, 18 episodes
2011–12	Pan Am	Ginny Sadler	3 episodes
2012	Major Crimes	Dr. Leslie Nolan	Episode: "Medical Causes"
2012	Common Law	Agent Carrie D'Amico	Episode: "The T Word"
2012	The Ropes	Stacey	
2012	Made in Jersey	Bonnie Garretti	Main role, 8 episodes
2013	Criminal Minds	Emma Churchill	
2014	Masters of Sex	Kitty	Episode: "Story of My Life"
2015	The Astronaut Wives Club	Marge Slayton	Main role
2015	Halt and Catch Fire	Jules Duffy	Episode: "10Broad36"; Episode: "Limbo"
2016	Madoff	Eleanor Squillari	
2016	Blue Bloods	Lori D'Angelo	Episode: "Help Me Help You"
2016	Feed the Beast	Marisa Gallo	
2017	The Blacklist	Calhoun	Episode: "Ilyas Surkov (No. 54)"
2018	The Flash	Vanessa Jensen / Block	Episode: "Blocked"
2019	NCIS	Major Ellen Wallace	Episode: "Hail & Farewell"
2019	All Rise	Detective Jackie Leyland	2 episodes
2019	Dynasty	DA Erica Brown	Episode: "The Sensational Blake Carrington Trial"
2020	9-1-1: Lone Star	Teri	Episode: "Act of God"
2020	Lucifer	Mandy	Episode: "Lucifer! Lucifer! Lucifer!"
2022	The Rookie	Ivy Flynn	Episode: "Long Shot"
2023	Nancy Drew	Chief Lovette	4 episodes

Web
Year	Title	Role	Notes
2019–2023	The John Campea Show	Co-host on Wednesday shows	
