= Jeremy Fernandez (singer) =

American singer

- Also known as: J-Dez
- Born: The Bronx, New York City
- Genres: Pop, R&B, hip hop
- Instruments: Vocals, guitar
- Years active: 2012–present
- Website: jeremyfernandez.com

Jeremy Fernandez is an American singer, actor and musical artist based in New York City. He is primarily known for his recent singles "Point Em' Out" (featuring Juelz Santana) and "Miss America" (featuring New Boyz).

== Personal life ==
Fernandez was born on December 18, 1997, in the Bronx, the northern borough of New York City.

== Career ==
=== Musician ===
In 2012, Fernandez released his debut single, "Miss America". The song features hip hop duo New Boyz. The song received radio play throughout the United States, and in 2013 a music video was produced for the song. The video was directed by Ricky Louis. According to Fernandez, the song is about "every guy trying to find the girl who's perfect for him."In 2013, Fernandez released his second single, "Point Em' Out". The single features hip hop artist Juelz Santana. A fan-dedicated video was produced for the song, for which fans submitted photographs of themselves which Fernandez displays in the video. An official music video for "Point Em' Out" will be released in June. Jeremy has stated that he is working with singer Cymphonique Miller on a new song titled "Don't Let Go". He released "Don't Let Go" on August 9, 2013. He released a new single "Simple Things" on February 16, 2014, and an official music video was released soon on his YouTube channel.

Fernandez describes his musical style as being a mix of pop, hip hop, R&B, and country. In an interview with WSCT Worldwide Radio, Fernandez said he considers some influences for his musical style to be Adam Levine, Chris Brown, Stevie Wonder, and Bill Withers.

=== Actor ===
Fernandez has appeared in a range of television shows and short films. His acting credits include roles on Law & Order: Criminal Intent, Little Miss Perfect, The Whitest Kids U' Know, Team Toon, and the 2009 edition of the Electric Company.

== Discography ==
=== Singles ===
Year	Single details
2012	"Miss America" feat. New Boyz: Independently released
2013	"Point Em' Out" feat. Juelz Santana: Independently released
2013	"Don't Let Go": Independently released
2014	"Simple Things": Independently released
