= Russel Fish: The Sausage and Eggs Incident =

- Directed by: Terence Heuston
- Written by: Terence Heuston
- Produced by: Eric Almquist
- Starring: Chris Colfer; Eddie Ruiz; Patrick Tromborg; Brett Gipson
- Edited by: Christopher Hart; Lu Shan Quon
- Release date: June 23, 2009 (Palm Springs Shortfest)
- Running time: 9 minutes
- Country: United States
- Language: English

Russel Fish: The Sausage and Eggs Incident is a 2009 comedy short film starring Chris Colfer.

The film won Best Comedic Short at the 2009 AOF International Film Festival, and screened at the 2010 Seattle International Film Festival, the 2009 Austin Film Festival, the 2009 Palm Springs International Shortfest, the 2009 New York Downtown Film Festival, and the 2009 Detroit/Windsor Film Festival, among others.

Russel Fish was written and directed by Terence Heuston, produced by Eric Almquist and edited by Christopher Hart and Lu Shan Quon.

== Plot ==
Chris Colfer is Russel Fish, an awkward teen who discovers he must pass the Presidential Physical Fitness Test or fail gym class and lose his admission to Harvard. With the help of his best friend Jorge played by Eddie Ruiz, an aspiring Latino ninja, he must overcome an evil gym teacher and sociopathic bully to achieve his goals.
