= Course of the Force =

- Date: July 7–11, 2012
- Location: Santa Monica - San Diego, California
- Beneficiary: Make-A-Wish Foundation
- Established: 2012
- Website: courseoftheforce.starwars.com

Course of the Force, founded in 2012, is a US partnership between Lucasfilm, Nerdist Industries, Machinima and Octagon. The partnership's primary event is an Olympic-style lightsaber relay along the California coast.

== History ==
The partnership and event are the brainchild of Peter Levin and Chris Hardwick, the operating heads of Nerdist Industries. The relay, held July 7–11, 2012 (the days leading up to San Diego Comic-Con), is a charity event to benefit the Make-A-Wish Foundation. Nerdist Industries founder Chris Hardwick will host the event, with broadcasts on the Nerdist YouTube channel. Machinima has announced it will produce Course of the Force content for its network as well.

== Participation ==
Running spots are available to the general public. The cost to sign up is $500. A limited edition Star Wars Ultimate FX lightsaber has been announced for the participants. Participants will travel from Santa Monica to San Diego in quarter-mile increments, handing off a lightsaber to the next runner.

== Charity ==
100% of registration proceeds from Course of the Force benefit the Make-A-Wish Foundation chapters of Greater Los Angeles, Orange County and Inland Empire, and San Diego.
