= Little Miss Perfect (film) =

- Theatrical Teaser Poster
- Directed by: Marlee Roberts
- Written by: Marlee Roberts
- Produced by: Marlee Roberts; Nancy Malone; Zac Gobetz; Alec Isaacs; Joseph Klein; Kathryn Mahler
- Starring: Karlee Roberts; Jeremy Fernandez; Lilla Crawford; Tom Degnan; Izzy Palmieri
- Cinematography: Oren Soffer
- Edited by: Stephen Kaiser-Pendergrast; Scott Schuler
- Music by: Giona Ostinelli
- Production company: Face Your Beast
- Distributed by: Cinemanas
- Release date: January 21, 2016 (Irvine International Film Festival)
- Country: United States
- Language: English

Little Miss Perfect is a 2016 American drama film written and directed by Marlee Roberts, starring Karlee Roberts, Izzy Palmieri, Jeremy Fernandez and Lilla Crawford.

== Plot summary ==
Belle, an over-achieving high school freshman, stumbles upon an online pro-eating disorder subculture as cracks begin to appear in her seemingly perfect life.

== Cast ==
- Karlee Roberts as Belle
- Jeremy Fernandez as Gus
- Lilla Crawford as Olivia
- Izzy Palmieri as Lyla
- Tom Degnan as Mr. Davy
- Charlie Swan as Madison
- Eden Wright as Sophia
- Brandon Bernath as Joey
- Cameron Fachman as Dave
- Peter Rini as Maurice

== Production ==
=== Script and development ===
Little Miss Perfect was written by Marlee Roberts and originally began as an adaptation of the traditional French fairytale La Belle et la Bete, popularly known in English as Beauty and the Beast.

The adaptation borrowed Belle's studious perfectionistic nature and combined it with the Beast's shame and temper. Belle was given a father who set off on a work venture, a mother who is out of the picture, and a confident bordering-on-arrogant suitor.

In the classic fairytale, in order to break the Beast's curse, the Beast must learn to love someone and be loved in return. In Little Miss Perfect, where Belle and the 'beast' are one and the same, Belle must learn to love herself in order to rid herself of this 'beast'.

Little Miss Perfect began development under the mentorship of NYU Professor Karl Bardosh, and former VP of 20th Century Fox, Nancy Malone. Roberts revised the screenplay, continuing research at the NYU Child Study Center with doctors in adolescent psychology, to incorporate the behavioral psychology of eating disorders, primarily anorexia.

=== Filming ===
Filming took place over four weeks in Stamford, Connecticut and New Rochelle, New York. Principal photography for the prestigious all-girls high school was shot on location at The College of New Rochelle campus and at the Leland Castle.

=== Release ===
Little Miss Perfect premiered at the Irvine International Film Festival on January 21, 2016, where it was nominated for Best Feature Film, and lead actress Karlee Roberts took home the Emerging Artist Award.
