= Lilla Crawford =

American actress

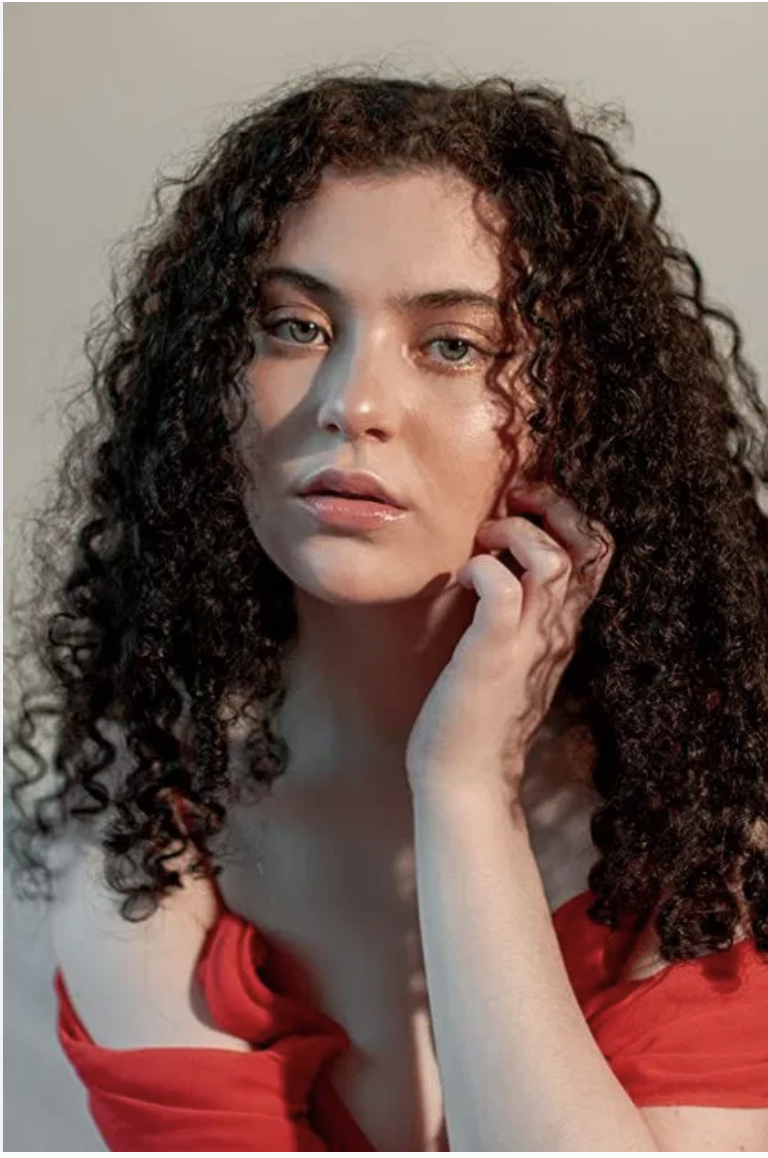
- Lilla Crawford NYC Photo Shoot
- Born: February 20, 2001 (age 25)
- Education: Tisch School of the Arts (BFA)
- Occupation: Actress
- Years active: 2007–present

Lilla Crawford (born February 20, 2001) is an American actress best known for portraying the title role in the 2012 Broadway revival of Annie. She made her Major Studio feature-film debut playing Little Red Riding Hood in the 2014 Disney film adaptation of Into the Woods. From 2017 to 2020, Crawford had voiced Sunny, the title character, in the Nickelodeon series Sunny Day and has starred in the Netflix series The Who Was? Show starting in 2018.

== Career ==
Crawford began her career at the age of six appearing in commercials, and since then has appeared in several more. She states that she begged her mother to find her an agent because it was her dream to be an animated voice.

She moved from Los Angeles to New York City, where she made her Broadway debut in 2011 as Debbie in the closing cast of the musical Billy Elliot.

After a nationwide search, she won the title role in James Lapine’s 2012 revival of the Tony Award-winning musical Annie at the age of 11, after having previously been in a community theatre production of the same show, where she played Bert Healy. She competed against over 5,000 other girls auditioning to play Annie over a span of nine months. After her initial audition in New York she had five or six callbacks, the final one with a dozen girls. While performing in Annie, she filmed the Broadway.com video blog "Simply Red" for the show, which earned her a broadway.com title of "most clicked stars of 2013".

She played "The Little Girl" in Ragtime at Avery Fisher Hall, alongside Lea Salonga, Norm Lewis, and many others. Crawford played Little Katie in a workshop production of Home the Musical by Scott Alan in New York City. She also appeared in a workshop of Melissa Arctic.

Crawford played Little Red Riding Hood in the Disney film adaptation of the musical Into the Woods. The film was released on December 25, 2014.

As of 2017, Crawford voices the leading character on the Nickelodeon animated series Sunny Day. She also starred in the Netflix series The Who Was? Show, based on the book series Who Was.

== Filmography ==
=== Film ===
Year	Title	Role	Notes
2014	Into the Woods	Red Riding Hood	
2016	Little Miss Perfect	Olivia	

=== Television ===
Year	Title	Role	Notes
2015	Blue Bloods	Lily	Episode: "Flags of Our Fathers"
2015	Forever	Zoe Dornis	Episode: "Punk is Dead"
2017-2018	Sunny Day	Sunny	Voice role; 13 episodes
2018	The Who Was? Show	Various roles	Series regular
2022-2024	Pretty Little Liars	Sandy	Recurring role; 7 episodes
2023	Raven's Home	Greta Gardunkian	Episode: "A.I., A.I., Oh... Snap!"

=== Theater ===
Year	Production	Role	Location	Venue	Dates
2011	Billy Elliot	Debbie (replacement)		Broadway	March 7, 2011 - January 8, 2012
2012-2013	Annie	Annie Bennett	Palace Theatre	Broadway	October 3, 2012 - July 30, 2013
2013	Ragtime	The Little Girl	Avery Fisher Hall		February 3, 2013 (one-night-only)

== Awards and nominations ==
Award	Year	Category	Work	Result
Broadcast Film Critics Association	2014	Best Acting Ensemble	Into the Woods	Nominated
Detroit Film Critics Society Award	2014	Best Ensemble	Into the Woods	Nominated
Golden Derby Award	2014	Best Ensemble	Into the Woods	Nominated
Phoenix Film Critics Society Award	2014	Best Performance by a Youth in a Lead or Supporting Role - Female	Into the Woods	Won
Phoenix Film Critics Society Award	2014	Best Cast	Into the Woods	Nominated
Outer Critics Circle Awards	2013	Outstanding Actress in a Musical	Annie	Nominated
Satellite Awards	2015	Best Ensemble – Motion Picture	Into the Woods	Won
Washington D.C. Area Film Critics Association Awards	2014	Best Ensemble	Into the Woods	Nominated
Young Artist Awards	2015	Best Performance in a Feature Film – Supporting Young Actress	Into the Woods	Won
