= Never Been Kissed (Glee) =

- Glee episode
- Episode no.: Season 2 Episode 6
- Directed by: Bradley Buecker
- Written by: Brad Falchuk
- Production code: 2ARC06
- Original air date: November 9, 2010

Guest appearances
- Iqbal Theba as Principal Figgins; Dot-Marie Jones as Shannon Beiste; Harry Shum, Jr. as Mike Chang; Chord Overstreet as Sam Evans; Max Adler as Dave Karofsky; Darren Criss as Blaine Anderson; Michael Hyatt as Joan Martin; Josh Sussman as Jacob Ben Israel; Telly Leung as Wes; Ashley Fink as Lauren Zizes; Lauren Potter as Becky Jackson

Episode chronology
← Previous "The Rocky Horror Glee Show"	Next → "The Substitute"
- Glee season 2

"Never Been Kissed" is the sixth episode of the second season of the American television series Glee, and the twenty-eighth episode overall. It was written by Brad Falchuk, directed by Bradley Buecker and premiered on Fox on November 9, 2010. In "Never Been Kissed", the glee club members are assigned a boys against girls singing competition. The bullying of club member Kurt Hummel (Chris Colfer) intensifies, but he meets a new ally in Blaine Anderson (Darren Criss), the lead singer of a rival glee club. Puck (Mark Salling) is released from juvenile detention and forms a friendship with Artie Abrams (Kevin McHale), and football coach Shannon Beiste (Dot-Marie Jones) is hurt when she learns that several of the students are visualizing her to quell their amorous moods.

The episode began a story arc about bullying which spanned the remainder of the season. It coincided with a spate of suicides among bullied youths, which reportedly gave the cast and crew additional inspiration to do their best work. Six songs were covered—four in the form of two mash-ups—and all were released as singles which charted on the Billboard Hot 100. Critics were less enthused by the mash-ups than the other performances; Criss's cover of "Teenage Dream" was particularly well-received, and became the first Glee single to top the Billboard Digital Songs chart.

10.99 million US viewers watched "Never Been Kissed". It was one of six episodes that were submitted to the judges for Glee's nomination in the Outstanding Comedy Series category at the 63rd Primetime Emmy Awards. Jones received an Outstanding Guest Actress in a Comedy Series nomination for her work on the show, and submitted this episode for judging. Reviewers approved of her performance but were very critical of her storyline and polarized by the plotting of the bullying story, though they generally approved of the episode's Puck and Artie sub-plot.

== Plot ==
Glee club director Will Schuester (Matthew Morrison) announces the second New Directions boys against girls singing competition. (Note: The first such competition is seen in the season one episode "Vitamin D".) He later sees a shaken Kurt Hummel in the hallway—he had been slammed against a locker by school bully Dave Karofsky (Max Adler)—and takes Kurt to his office to recover. Kurt criticizes both the school's failure to act against homophobic bullying and the lack of challenge in the club's competition; Will decides to modify the assignment to have the teams perform songs by groups of different genders. Kurt is happier with the new spin, but the other boys are unreceptive to his ideas for their team. Puck is especially dismissive, and suggests that he go spy on the Dalton Academy Warblers, one of their competitors at the forthcoming Sectionals round of show choir competition. The girls' team decides on and sings a mash-up of "Start Me Up / Livin' on a Prayer".

Kurt visits Dalton Academy, an all-boys private school, and watches the Warblers perform "Teenage Dream". He is befriended by lead singer Blaine Anderson, who is also gay and encourages Kurt to stand up for himself. The next time he is attacked by Karofsky, Kurt confronts him in the boys' locker room, and as the argument intensifies he is kissed by Karofsky, which leaves Kurt stunned. After Kurt tells Blaine of this, he and Kurt later try to talk to Karofsky about the difficulties and confusion his homosexual feelings must be causing him, but Karofsky denies that anything happened and soon returns to bullying Kurt.

Puck has been granted early release from juvenile detention on the condition that he performs community service. He picks Artie Abrams, a paraplegic, to fulfill that service, and the two busk in the school courtyard. They sing a duet of "One Love/People Get Ready" while Puck surreptitiously intimidates their schoolmates into giving donations. He then helps Artie get back together with Brittany Pierce (Heather Morris), by setting up a double date with them and Santana Lopez (Naya Rivera). Puck's caseworker Joan Martin (Michael Hyatt) had believed he was working to rehabilitate gang members, and tells him he will have to return to the detention center unless he finds an alternative type of service. Puck admits to Artie that despite his bravado, he was miserable when locked up and does not want to return; Artie convinces him to complete the required real community service and offers to tutor him in school.

Some members of New Directions, who need to cool their arousal while making out, discover that picturing football coach Shannon Beiste (Dot Marie Jones) is very effective. When she finds out about their technique, Beiste is deeply hurt and submits her resignation. Will attempts to convince her to stay, and gives her a friendly kiss when she admits she has never been kissed. He then invites Beiste to watch the boys' competition performance; they apologize, dedicate their mash-up of "Stop! In the Name of Love / Free Your Mind" to Beiste, and win her forgiveness.

== Production ==
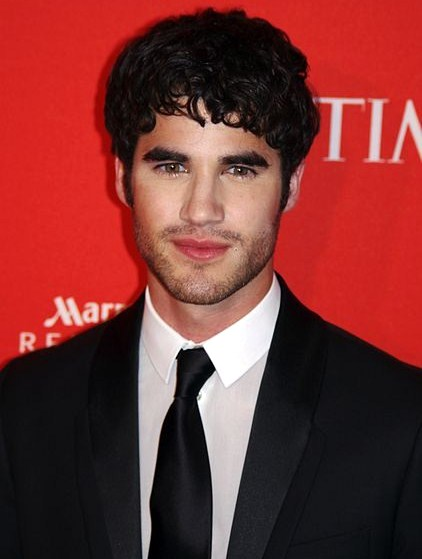
Darren Criss (pictured) debuted in this episode. He auditioned for multiple roles on the series before being cast as Blaine.

"Never Been Kissed" was written by series co-creator Brad Falchuk, directed by Bradley Buecker, and premiered on November 9, 2010. It launched a story arc about bullying, which Glee co-creator Ryan Murphy had been building to for a season and a half. He explained that he wanted Kurt to reach a point where he would not accept the abusive treatment he received any more, and planned to follow the developments through the rest of the year, as all of the other characters were affected. The revelation that Karofsky's antagonism stemmed from his own homosexual feelings was based on a personal acquaintance of Murphy's. After the episode had been written, a spate of suicides occurred around the nation among teenage victims of bullying, which Murphy said added extra significance to "Never Been Kissed" and "ignite[d] the cast and the crew to do their best and push themselves with the story."

The episode introduced Criss as Blaine, a gay member of a rival glee club, the Dalton Academy Warblers. In September 2010, a casting call was released for an actor to portray a "cute, charismatic, gay high school junior" who would lead a competing glee club. Criss had auditioned for Glee several times before, once for the role of Finn Hudson. The character breakdown for Blaine was the first he believed he had a chance of securing, and indeed his audition was successful. Blaine was introduced primarily as a mentor to Kurt. Criss explained, "At this point, Kurt's [sexuality] has been such a sense of discord in his life. Blaine finds [being gay] empowering. He embraces who he is, and sees Kurt [struggling with] the same things that he had to deal with, and I think he wants to impart that knowledge." Murphy described Blaine as a character with "great self-loathing" and regret for having run away from his own tormentors; he intended this to form part of his story arc for the season, as Blaine tries to set right some past mistakes. Neither he nor Criss knew whether Blaine would eventually become Kurt's boyfriend—a role originally intended for new club member Sam Evans (Chord Overstreet) until the producers decided to change Sam to heterosexual and paired him with Quinn—but based on the characters' chemistry and the "immediate outcry" from fans who wanted to see them as a couple, Murphy later decided to pair them romantically.

Other recurring characters who appeared were glee club members Sam and Mike Chang (Harry Shum, Jr.), Principal Figgins (Iqbal Theba), jock bully Dave Karofsky, cheerleader Becky Jackson (Lauren Potter), students Jacob Ben Israel (Josh Sussman) and Lauren Zizes (Ashley Fink), and Coach Shannon Beiste. Although Beiste's physical appearance was used as comedy in the episode, Jones was not offended; she called it hysterical, said "it serves a purpose for the message" and hoped "maybe it will make people think outside of the show." Murphy intended her storyline to highlight the fact that bullying can be damaging without necessarily being overt. He stated: "Th[e] episode is completely about accountability. If you can change any young impressionable minds and make them aware of the consequences of their actions and all different forms of cruelty, I think that’s a great, great gift." Telly Leung and Titus Makin Jr. guest starred as Wes and David respectively, two additional members of the Dalton Academy Warblers. Hyatt guest starred as Joan Martin, Puck's probation officer.

The episode featured cover versions of "Teenage Dream" by Katy Perry, "One Love/People Get Ready" by Bob Marley & the Wailers, and mash-ups of The Rolling Stones' "Start Me Up" with Bon Jovi's "Livin' on a Prayer", and The Supremes' "Stop! In the Name of Love" with En Vogue's "Free Your Mind". All of the songs performed were released as singles, available for download, and "Teenage Dream" and "One Love/People Get Ready" are featured on the soundtrack album Glee: The Music, Volume 4. "Teenage Dream" was later also included as the opening track on the seventh soundtrack album, Glee: The Music Presents the Warblers. The background vocals of "Teenage Dream" were provided by collegiate a cappella group the Beelzebubs from Tufts University.

== Reception ==
=== Ratings ===
During its original broadcast, "Never Been Kissed" was watched by 10.99 million American viewers and attained a 4.6/13 Nielsen rating/share in the 18–49 demographic. Its rating was a season low to that point; however, Glee was the top-rated show for the night of broadcast in all under-50 categories. It was the most-viewed scripted show of the week amongst adults 18–49, and ranked twenty-first amongst all viewers. In Australia, the episode was watched by 1.081 million viewers, a decline from previous weeks, which was attributed by David Dale of The Sydney Morning Herald to many regular viewers being away on Schoolies week. In Canada, 1.97 million viewers watched the episode, placing twelfth for the week. In the UK, the episode was watched by 2.64 million viewers (2.20 million on E4, and 438,000 on E4+1), which made it the most-watched show on cable for the week.

=== Accolades ===
Glee was nominated in the Outstanding Comedy Series category at the 63rd Primetime Emmy Awards: "Never Been Kissed" was one of six episodes submitted for consideration, paired with the season's fourth episode, "Duets". Jones received an Outstanding Guest Actress in a Comedy Series nomination for her work on Glee's second season, and submitted her performance in the episode for final judging.

=== Critical response ===
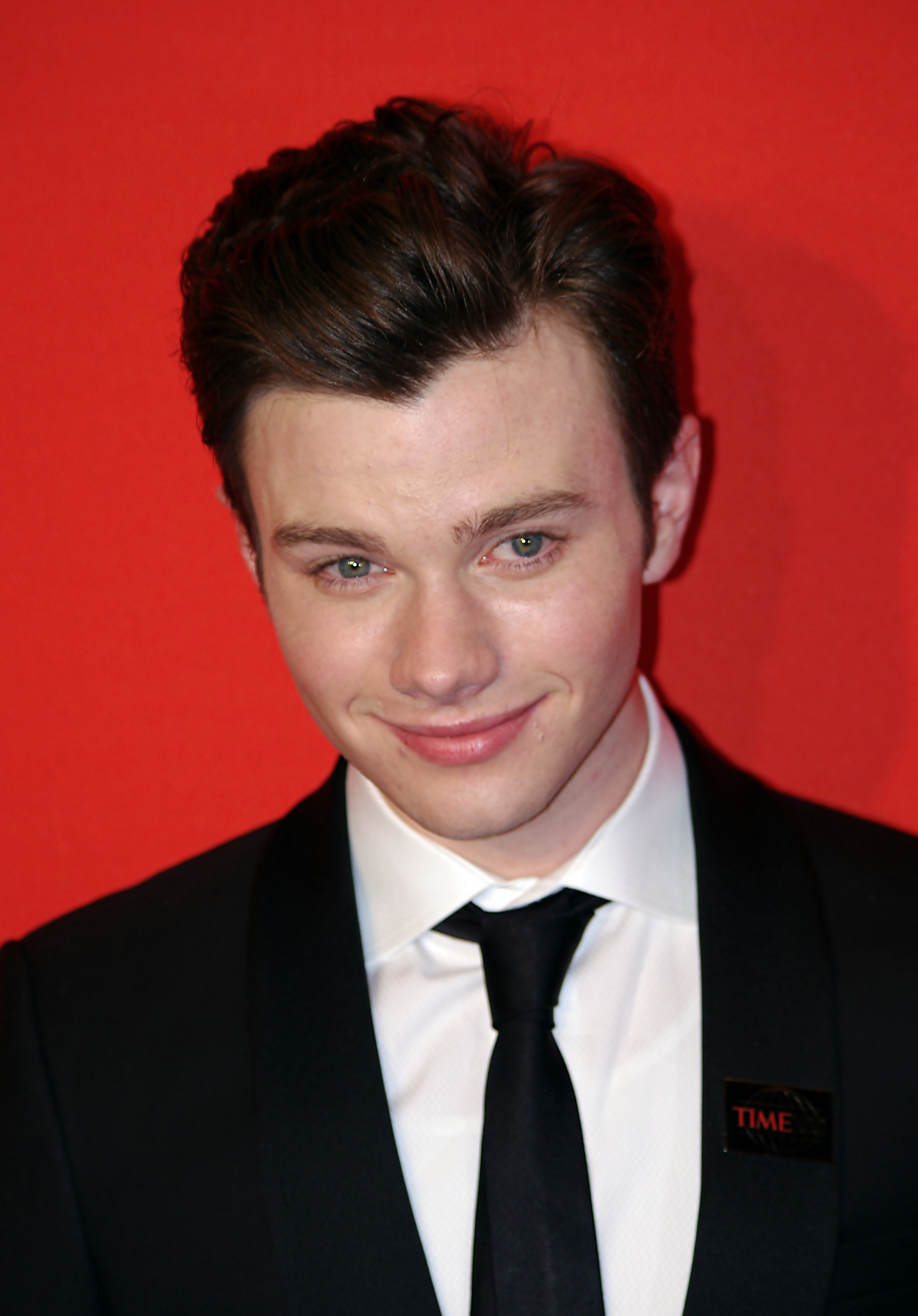
Critics were polarized by the storyline about the bullying of Kurt (Chris Colfer, pictured).

"Never Been Kissed" received mixed reviews from critics, who were polarized by Kurt's storyline. While CNN's Lisa Respers France thought it was Glee's best episode thus far and IGN's Robert Canning rated it 9 out of 10, which signifies an outstanding episode, Linda Holmes of National Public Radio dismissed it as "one of the most facile and emotionally inauthentic episodes the show has ever produced", and Emily VanDerWerff of The A.V. Club deemed it a failure on "almost every level." The Huffington Post's Leah Anthony Libresco found it an "extraordinarily counterproductive" response to the string of teenage gay suicides in early 2010. Bobby Hankinson of the Houston Chronicle and James Poniewozik of Time approved of the storyline in principle—the former opined that Glee's willingness to raise mainstream awareness of such issues was "incredibly courageous", and the latter appreciated that it would span a multi-episode arc—but both were critical of its depiction in practice.

Many elements of the plot were highlighted as being problematic. Holmes felt that Karofsky's swift transition from bullying to kissing Kurt was absurd and "emotionally unsound". Libresco disapproved of Will for treating Kurt's upset as the key problem, rather than the unchecked bullying which provoked it. She found Blaine's advice to Kurt "misleading and dangerous", especially the suggestion that targeted children should be held responsible for confronting their attackers and putting themselves at risk of further injury, rather than for protecting themselves. VanDerWerff and Poniewozik were critical of Dalton Academy: the former found its tolerance unrealistic and the latter was disappointed that Glee declined to depict a flawed high school tackling bullying in favor of creating "an almost otherworldly paradise". Poniewozik also noted that the storyline was inherently flawed, as the show had previously treated bullying in a light-hearted manner, but opined that its saving grace was the focus it placed on Colfer, "probably the strongest actor with the most interesting character among the Glee kids".

Further praise for Colfer's performance came from Canning and Entertainment Weekly's Tim Stack, who approved of the episode for its depiction of there being no simple solution to the bullying. Amy Reiter of the Los Angeles Times commented that it was testament to the writers and cast that Karofsky's kiss startled the audience as much as it did Kurt, and commended the transitioning of Karofsky from a faceless jock into "a nuanced character with a back story and hidden motives of his own." MTV's Aly Semigran wrote that, should the episode inspire a single teenager to have courage in the face of discrimination, or re-consider bullying, it would be an impressive accomplishment.

The Beiste storyline was met with criticism. Reiter questioned why Beiste was made to look to high school students to "gauge her own desirability", an element she found "hazy and creepy". Poniewozik criticized the depiction of Beiste as an object of pity, and felt that Will's behavior was worse than the students' when he acted with "amazing condescension" and kissed her. Both Poniewozik and Semigran disliked the way viewers were made complicit in Beiste's humiliation by being invited to laugh at her expense, and Holmes criticized Glee for denying Beiste dignity, with the observation that such a plot would never have been given to Kurt. VanDerWerff commented negatively on the way Glee plays up Beiste's "masculine nature" while simultaneously lecturing viewers against mocking her. She called the kiss "somehow both heartfelt and completely horrifying". Canning praised Jones in her "best performance this season", as well as Beiste's "raw and real" confession to Will.

The Puck sub-plot received generally positive reviews. Poniewozik called it the "best and most authentic of the night", with praise for Salling's performance, and Canning felt that it served well as a comical break from the episode's other storylines. Brett Berk of Vanity Fair enjoyed the additional depth given to Puck, and he, Stack and New York's Rebecca Milzoff commented positively on Puck's budding friendship with Artie. VanDerWerff deemed it the episode's "least objectionable" storyline, though wrote that the awkward inclusion of their duet, the abruptness of Artie's feelings for Brittany, and the "forced nature" of the scene in which Puck confesses that he does not want to return to juvenile detention all "conspired to keep the storyline from lifting off."

=== Music and performances ===
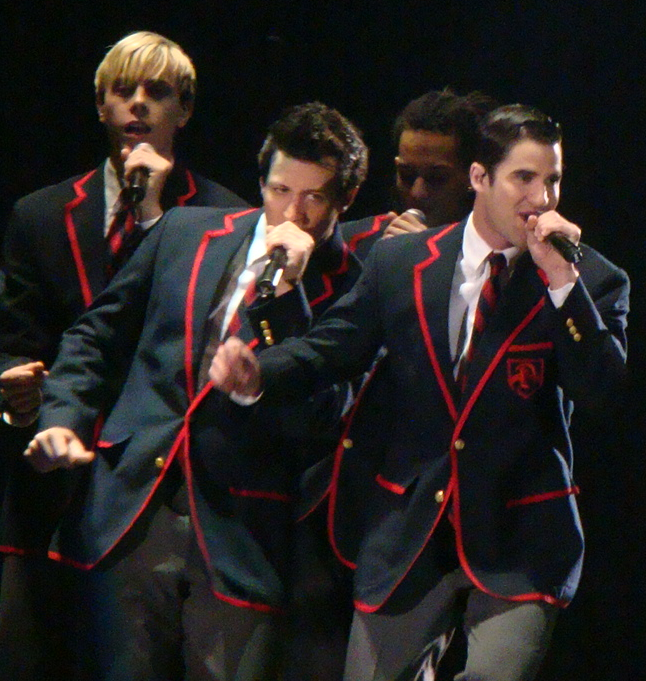
The Dalton Academy Warblers performing "Teenage Dream" on the 2011 Glee Live! In Concert! tour, led by Blaine (front right).

Reviews of the episode's musical numbers were also mixed, with the mash-ups less favorably received than the other performances. Canning felt that the songs intruded on the storytelling. Hankinson wrote that the mash-ups were "shoehorned in [to an] already over-stuffed hour", and Emily Yahr of The Washington Post said they served "no real purpose".

BuddyTV's Jen Harper enjoyed the harmonies and simple arrangement of "One Love/People Get Ready", and Anthony Benigno of the Daily News gave it an "A", with praise for the vocals. Stack graded it "B−". He called it a "nice performance", but incongruous in context, a concern shared by Erica Futterman of Rolling Stone, who preferred Salling's rendition of "Only the Good Die Young" in the episode "Grilled Cheesus".

Perry expressed approval of the cover of her song, "Teenage Dream", through the social networking website Twitter. Harper found the choreography uncomfortable viewing, and Hanh Nguyen of Zap2it agreed that the performers appeared to be "rockin' out a bit too much to it", but felt that the song worked "remarkably well" overall. Futterman deemed it the best song of the episode, and appreciated that it was more understated than numbers performed by rival glee club Vocal Adrenaline during the show's first season. Stack went further and called the performance one of his favorites on Glee; he enjoyed the choreography and arrangement and graded it "A+". Benigno again gave the song an "A"; he called it "flawless" and an improvement on Perry's original. In December 2012, TV Guide named the rendition one of Glee's best performances.

The girls' Bon Jovi–Rolling Stones mash-up was received favorably by Stack and Milzoff—the former graded it "A", the latter called it "brash and fun", and both writers appreciated the black leather costumes. While Harper also liked the costumes and the energetic performance, she felt it "paled in comparison" to the last mash-up the girls performed, in the season one episode "Vitamin D". Futterman commented that the costumes and choreography overwhelmed the vocals, to the point of being "a little too Miley and not enough Glee". Benigno called the song a "cacophony" and gave it his lowest performance grade of the episode, a "D". He suggested that Glee had been responsible for "reviving the mashup fad", but hoped the girls' performance would serve to end it again. The boys' Supremes–En Vogue mash-up was graded "A" by Stack, who liked the combination of artists. Harper preferred the girls' costumes but felt the boys gave the better performance, while Futterman found it overly-sentimental in context, but also preferred it to the girls' song. Benigno gave it a "C", and commented, "Not quite the debacle the previous mash-up was, but given how fantastic this episode was, the sendoff should've been better."

=== Chart history ===
All four of the cover versions featured debuted on the Billboard Hot 100, and appeared on other musical charts. On the Hot 100, the show's rendition of "Teenage Dream" debuted at number eight, and sold 55,000 downloads on its first day and a total of 214,000 copies in its first week, the best first-day and first-week sales numbers for any Glee Cast single. It was the first Glee single to top Billboard's Digital Songs chart, and debuted at number ten on the Canadian Hot 100. "Teenage Dream" was also the first single since the pilot's "Don't Stop Believin'" to be certified gold in the US. The other three songs on the Hot 100 were "Start Me Up / Livin' on a Prayer" at number thirty-one, which also made number twenty-two on the Canadian Hot 100; "Stop! In the Name of Love / Free Your Mind" at number thirty-eight, which also made number twenty-eight on the Canadian Hot 100; and "One Love/People Get Ready" at number forty-one, which also made number thirty-two on the Canadian Hot 100.
