= Blue ring =

Bluering, blue ring, blue-ringed may refer to:

== Products ==
- Blue Origin Blue Ring, an orbital tug spacecraft
- 8 cm Granatwerfer 34 Blauring (German: 8-cm mortar grenade 1934 "Bluering"), a WWII German infantry mortar

== Other uses ==
- Blue Ring of Power, a fictional DC Comics power ring for the Blue Lantern Corps
- Blue ring danio (Danio tinwini sp. Blue Ring), the Blue Ring, a breed of danio goldfish

== See also ==
- Blurring (disambiguation)
- Blue (disambiguation)
- Ring (disambiguation)
