= Blurred =

Blurred may refer to:

- Blurred vision, blurring of an image due to incorrect focus
- Blurred lanternshark, a species of dogfish shark
- Blurred (play), an Australian play by Stephen Davies about schoolies week
- Blurred (film), a 2002 Australian film about schoolies week
- "Blurred" (song), a song by Pianoman

== See also ==
- Blur (disambiguation)
