= The Substitute (Glee) =

- Glee episode
- Episode no.: Season 2 Episode 7
- Directed by: Ryan Murphy
- Written by: Ian Brennan
- Production code: 2ARC07
- Original air date: November 16, 2010

Guest appearances
- Gwyneth Paltrow as Holly Holliday; Iqbal Theba as Principal Figgins; Dot-Marie Jones as Shannon Beiste; Harry Shum, Jr. as Mike Chang; Chord Overstreet as Sam Evans; Max Adler as Dave Karofsky; Darren Criss as Blaine Anderson; Lindsey Sims-Lewis as Cameo; Ashley Fink as Lauren Zizes; Lauren Potter as Becky Jackson

Episode chronology
← Previous "Never Been Kissed"	Next → "Furt"
- Glee season 2

"The Substitute" is the seventh episode of the second season of the American television series Glee, and the twenty-ninth episode overall. It was written by Ian Brennan, directed by Ryan Murphy, and premiered on Fox on November 16, 2010. The episode guest stars Gwyneth Paltrow as Holly Holliday, a substitute teacher who takes the place of glee club director Will Schuester (Matthew Morrison) while he is ill. Cheerleading coach Sue Sylvester (Jane Lynch) causes problems as the fill-in substitute principal of William McKinley High School after she gets Principal Figgins (Iqbal Theba) infected with the flu, and glee club members Mercedes Jones (Amber Riley) and Kurt Hummel (Chris Colfer) experience tension in their friendship.

The episode features cover versions of six songs, which received mixed reviews from critics. While the Glee cover of Cee Lo Green's "Forget You" and mash-up of "Singin' in the Rain" with Rihanna's "Umbrella" attracted critical praise and charted both on the Billboard Hot 100 and internationally, the episode's dance-based performances were criticized for their choreography and strict adherence to the original versions. The episode was watched by 11.70 million US viewers, and was the top scripted show among adults aged 18–49 for the week of broadcast.

Paltrow's guest appearance attracted positive commentary, but the episode's sub-plots were less well received. Aly Semigran of MTV, Robert Canning of IGN and Entertainment Weekly's Tim Stack all deemed the episode one of the best of the season. Time's James Poniewozik felt that it was a relatively subdued, mediocre episode, and Emily VanDerWerff of The A.V. Club found it to be an improvement on the previous two episodes, if not genuinely good. The National Alliance on Mental Illness criticized the episode for its depiction of bipolar disorder. Paltrow won the 2011 Primetime Emmy Award for Outstanding Guest Actress in a Comedy Series for her performance.

== Plot ==
Cheerleading coach Sue Sylvester (Jane Lynch) is appointed acting principal of William McKinley High School after having Principal Figgins (Iqbal Theba) infected with the flu. Glee club director Will Schuester (Matthew Morrison) is also infected, and takes time off work to recover. He is cared for by his ex-wife Terri (Jessalyn Gilsig), which leads to them sleeping together.

Glee club co-captain Rachel Berry (Lea Michele) attempts to take over for Will, but this results in chaos. At the request of Kurt Hummel (Chris Colfer), club lessons are instead covered by substitute teacher Holly Holliday (Gwyneth Paltrow), whose unconventional methods include discussing Lindsay Lohan's rehabilitation in Spanish, singing "Conjunction Junction" to her English class, and roleplaying as a bipolar Mary Todd Lincoln for the History class. When Holly first arrives at glee club rehearsal, she impresses the club with her rendition of Cee Lo Green's "Forget You". Rachel is annoyed and worries that Holly may be unable to sufficiently prepare them for the upcoming Sectionals competition. Holly later wins over Rachel by duetting with her on "Nowadays/Hot Honey Rag" from Chicago.

Kurt neglects his best friend Mercedes Jones (Amber Riley) in favor of his new friend Blaine Anderson (Darren Criss). Mercedes is offended when Kurt tries to set her up on a date with a football player on the basis that they are both black, and feels left out when she accompanies Kurt and Blaine to dinner, where conversation is dominated by gay issues and icons. When Sue begins a healthy eating initiative and declares a ban on "Potater Tots", Mercedes organizes a student protest and fills the tailpipe of Sue's car with Tots, causing $17,000 worth of damage.

Sue's initiative proves popular with the students' parents, and her appointment as principal is made permanent. She fires Figgins (after the school board is flooded with emails in support of Sue) and Will who is later visited by Holly seeking advice. Holly feels out of her depth as a teacher, having enabled Mercedes' behavior. She confesses that she originally took her work seriously, until a student (Lindsay Sims-Lewis) punched her in the face, prompting her more laid-back approach. Terri arrives while they are talking and is angered by Holly's presence. Will asks her to leave, telling her that their reunion was a mistake and concluding their relationship for good.

Kurt confronts Mercedes, suggesting that she is substituting food for love and their friendship for a romantic relationship. Mercedes decides to talk to the student Kurt attempted to set her up with. As she departs, Kurt is approached by school bully Dave Karofsky (Max Adler), who threatens to kill him if Kurt reveals his closeted homosexuality.

At the urging of the glee club members, Sue reinstates Will. He suggests a group performance of "Singin' in the Rain", but asks for Holly's help to modernize it, resulting in a mash-up with Rihanna's "Umbrella".

== Production ==
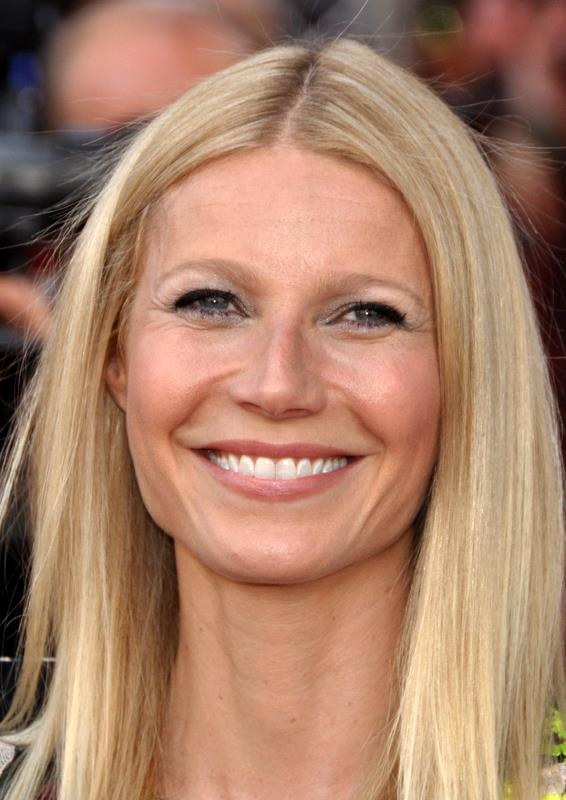
The role of Holly Holliday was created specifically for Paltrow (pictured).

Paltrow's Glee appearance marked her first ever scripted-series guest performance. The role of Holly was created for her by series creator Ryan Murphy, a personal friend who suggested that she showcase her vocal and dancing talent ahead of the December 2010 release of the film Country Strong, in which Paltrow plays a country singer. Upon announcing her casting in September 2010, BBC News reported that she would appear in two episodes of the series. E! Online's Kristin dos Santos stated that Holly would serve as a love interest for Will, with Murphy later confirming that Holly's appearance would create a love quadrangle between herself, Will, guidance counselor Emma Pillsbury (Jayma Mays) and her boyfriend Carl Howell (John Stamos). However, Fancast later reported that Paltrow's guest-arc had been reduced to a single episode, and neither Mays nor Stamos appear in "The Substitute". Post-broadcast, Murphy stated that both he and Paltrow hoped that she would appear on Glee again in the future, depending on the right storyline. In December 2010, Paltrow confirmed that she would return to the series for another episode at a later date, and in January 2011, Murphy confirmed her reappearance, this time as a sex education teacher planned for episodes 15 and 16. Paltrow won the 2011 Primetime Emmy Award for Outstanding Guest Actress in a Comedy Series for her appearance in "The Substitute".

"The Substitute" includes a fantasy sequence in which Will hallucinates the club members as kindergarten-aged children. Child actors were hired to portray the characters' younger selves, including Jake Vaughn and Lauren Boles as a young Finn and Rachel. The episode also features the return of Gilsig, following an absence spanning several episodes. The actress felt that Will's illness allowed viewers to see the couple with their defences down for the first time, and that the addition of Holly highlighted a double standard in their relationship. She explained that while Terri is not "the most palatable person", she is at least faithful to Will, while he has "a wandering eye" and treats Terri badly in "The Substitute". Recurring characters in this episode include glee club members Mike Chang (Harry Shum, Jr.) and Sam Evans (Chord Overstreet), Principal Figgins, school bully Dave Karofsky, cheerleader Becky Jackson (Lauren Potter), wrestler Lauren Zizes (Ashley Fink) and Kurt's friend Blaine Anderson.

The episode features cover versions of six songs. Paltrow performs on four, which she recorded in a single afternoon. Her numbers include "Conjunction Junction" from Schoolhouse Rock!, and a clean version of Cee Lo Green's "Fuck You!" entitled "Forget You". The producers considered having Paltrow sing a Coldplay song, but decided to save the band's work for a competition episode. Morrison and Shum, Jr. enact a frame-by-frame recreation of "Make 'Em Laugh" from the musical film Singin' in the Rain. Paltrow and Michele duet on "Nowadays / Hot Honey Rag" from the musical Chicago, and the glee club with Morrison and Paltrow perform a mash-up of "Singin' in the Rain" with "Umbrella" by Rihanna featuring Jay-Z. The staging of "Singin' in the Rain / Umbrella" required the cast to spend twelve hours filming in a tank of water.

All of the songs performed, with the exception of "Conjunction Junction", were released as singles, available for download, and "Forget You" is featured on the soundtrack album Glee: The Music, Volume 4. "Forget You" and "Singing in the Rain / Umbrella" charted both on the Billboard Hot 100 and internationally. The former reached number 11 in the US and 12 in Canada, while the latter peaked at number 10 in Ireland. Green's "Fuck You!" entered the top ten of the Hot 100 for the first time following the Glee cover, with sales rising 94% in a week.

== Reception ==
=== Ratings ===
During its original broadcast, "The Substitute" was watched by 11.70 million US viewers. It attained a 5.0/14 Nielsen rating/share in the 18–49 demographic, making it the top-rated show of the night amongst adults aged 18–49. In the weekly program rankings, Glee was the top scripted show among adults 18–49, and placed twentieth in overall viewers. Viewership and ratings both increased from the previous episode, "Never Been Kissed", which was watched by 10.99 million viewers and attained a 4.6/13 rating/share. In Canada, viewership also improved on "Never Been Kissed", with "The Substitute" drawing 2.29 million viewers and ranking ninth for the week, up from 1.97 million and twelfth for the previous episode. In Australia, the episode drew 1.06 million viewers, making Glee the seventh most-watched show of the night, and nineteenth of the week. Viewership declined from "Never Been Kissed", which was watched by 1.08 million viewers; despite this, the series registered a rise from eighth and twenty-seventh in the daily and weekly program rankings respectively. In the UK, the episode was watched by 2.55 million viewers—2.11 million on E4, and 439,000 on E4+1—becoming the most-watched show on cable for the week.

=== Critical response ===
The episode received mixed reviews from critics. Aly Semigran of MTV, Robert Canning of IGN and Entertainment Weekly's Tim Stack all deemed it one of the best of the season, with Canning rating it an "incredible" 9.5/10, and Semigran stating that it contained all of the series' best elements: "surprising musical numbers, with the right balance of humor and life lessons." Emily VanDerWerff of The A.V. Club found it to be an improvement on the previous two episodes, writing that if not genuinely good, "The Substitute" at least proved that Glee has not been entirely subsumed by its own hype. Time's James Poniewozik felt that it was a relatively subdued, mediocre episode, which contained "a collection of good small moments". Brett Berk of Vanity Fair criticized the focus it placed on the adult characters at the expense of the teenagers and the disregard for continuing plot strands in favor of a celebrity cameo, but concluded that "despite all that, some of it kind of worked." The National Alliance on Mental Illness (NAMI) took exception to this episode, which, it stated, "mocked and trivialized bipolar disorder" during Paltrow's history classroom scene, in which she role-plays as Mary Todd Lincoln. NAMI encouraged people to contact Murphy and Fox TV to convey their disappointment with the scene.

"To watch Gwyneth Paltrow on Glee Tuesday was like being transported back to the late 1990s, when she could do no wrong and to see her on a screen was a guarantee of a compelling performance [...] Whether she came onto Glee as a sweeps-week stunt, to again show off her pipes before the release of her film Country Strong or simply out of the kindness of her heart, Ms. Paltrow was perfectly suited to her role as Holly Holliday"

— Dave Itzkoff of The New York Times, on Paltrow's guest appearance.

Paltrow's guest appearance attracted critical praise. Both Stack and E! Online's Kristin dos Santos called it Emmy-worthy, with the former rating it amongst her best ever performances, and the latter stating that Holly received "some of Glee's best-ever one-liners. VanDerWerff enjoyed her role, and wrote that Holly injected an effortless sense of fun, despite much of her plot being nonsensical. Entertainment Weekly's Ken Tucker praised Paltrow for being one of the first guest stars to perform well alongside Sue, and wrote that her classroom scenes made the episode "one in which the guest star both stood out and meshed with the cast". The Atlantic's Meghan Brown commented that Paltrow "brought a massive spark to what could have been a one-note role", and her Atlantic co-author Kevin Fallon wrote that her energetic performance saved an episode that might have been "in shambles without her presence". Canning stated that Paltrow's casting could have been distracting, but instead she fit the role "seamlessly", and CNN's Lisa Respers France compared her performance favorably to Britney Spears's cameo in the episode "Britney/Brittany". Several critics stated that they enjoyed Paltrow's appearance despite experiencing trepidation about it prior to broadcast. Berk found her "surprisingly great", and Poniewozik said that while her casting was somewhat distracting, she was able to make Holly a sympathetic character without overdoing her neediness and commitment-phobia. Jen Chaney of The Washington Post recommended a "lengthy moratorium" on internet criticism of Paltrow, suggesting that with her Glee appearance, her "mission to charm the American public may be complete".

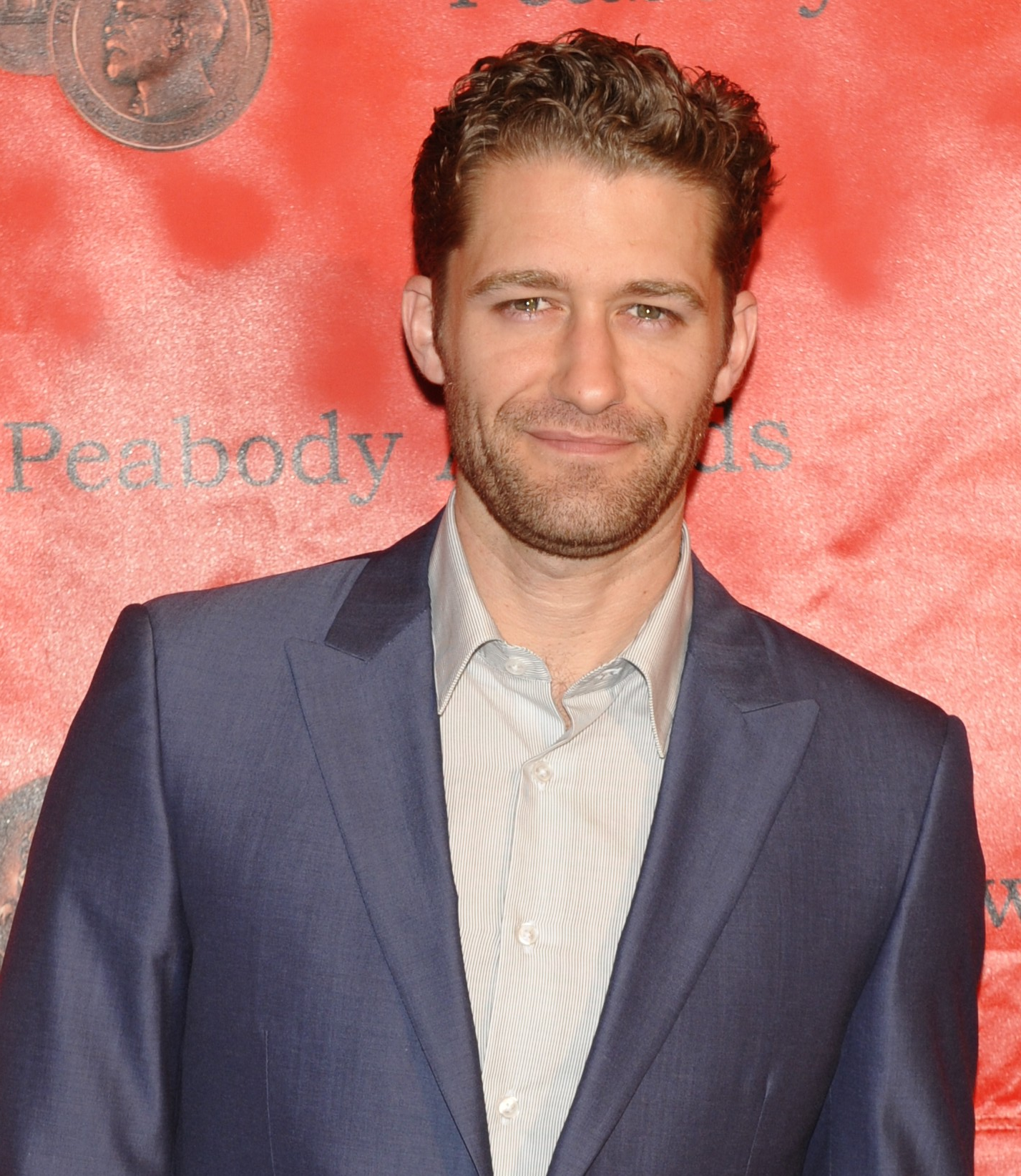
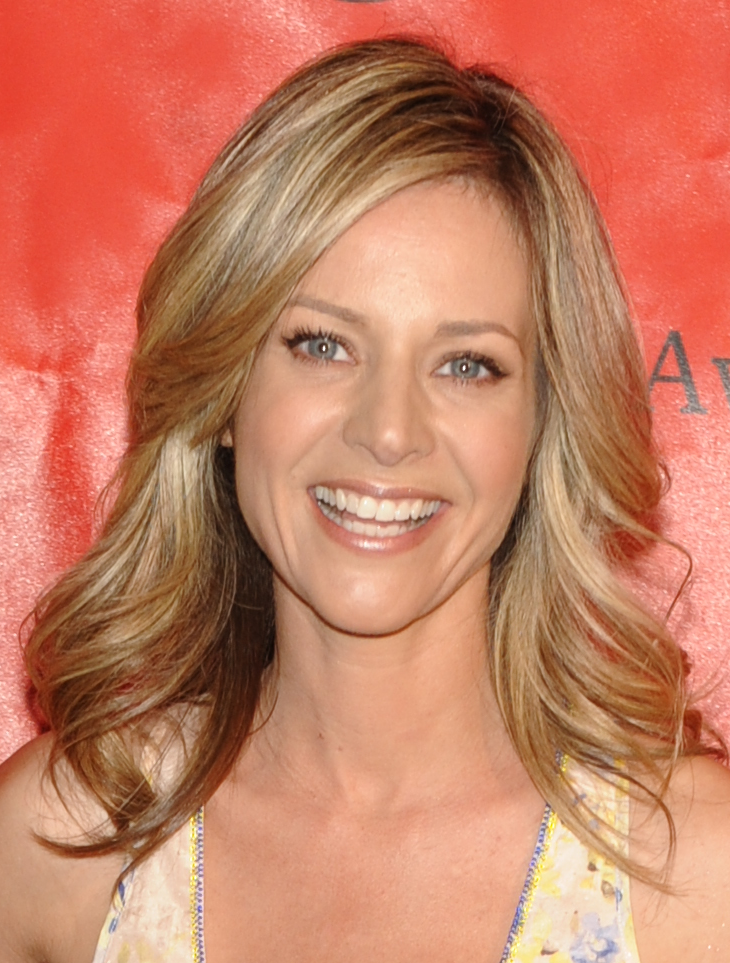
Critics were divided over the reunion between ex-spouses Will (Matthew Morrison, left) and Terri (Jessalyn Gilsig, right), particularly due to Will's erratic characterization.

Critics were divided over the Schuester sub-plot. Both Semigran and Poniewozik enjoyed Will's characterization, with Poniewozik commenting that he became an "identifiable human" again, following a season throughout which his behavior has been erratic and unreliable. In contrast, VanDerWerff criticized the sub-plot for ignoring Will's culpability in the breakdown of his marriage, and expressed displeasure at his inconsistent characterization, deeming it one of the season's biggest problems. Stack commented negatively on the return of Terri, finding her dislikeable and unnecessary, as Glee already has a villain in Sue.

The Mercedes storyline attracted criticism. Fallon took offence at Glee's sole overweight black character turning into a "fried potato-addicted junkie", and both Berk and Stack commented that while they had hoped for Mercedes to receive a major storyline, they did not want it to be centered on her weight issues. Semigran called it "rather disposable" but appreciated the "silliness and levity" it introduced, and Respers France noted that she did not mind the storyline itself, but disliked Kurt lecturing his supposed best friend. VanDerWerff felt that the Tots plot was "one element too many" in what could have been a "pretty potent emotional storyline", but praised the performances by Colfer and Riley. Stack appreciated their dinner with Blaine, finding it representative of what he enjoys about the show, commenting: "Last week, Kurt's sexuality was the central emotional storyline of the episode, and this week it was played for laughs. Kurt's character has to walk that fine line between being a role model and becoming too saintly. I think the writers are navigating that tightrope quite, quite well."

==== Music ====
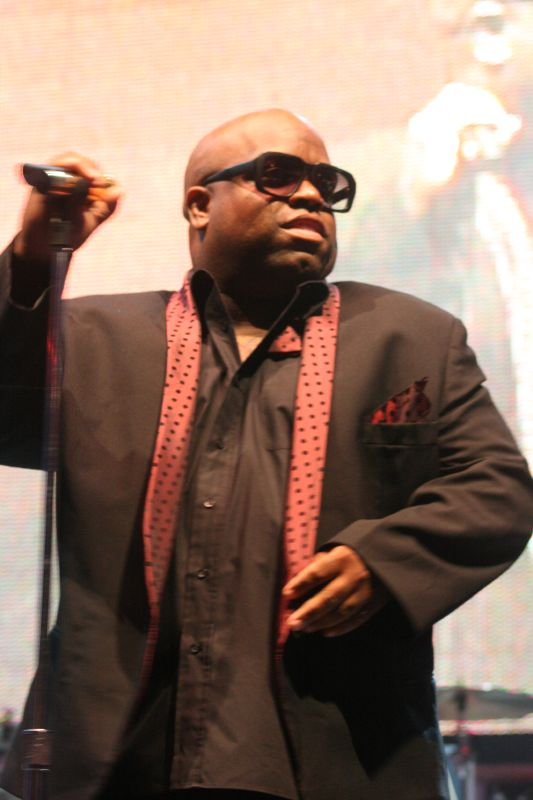
Cee Lo Green (pictured) expressed approval of Paltrow's cover of his song "Forget You".

Musical performances also received mixed reviews. Anthony Benigno of the Daily News gave "Conjunction Junction" a grade of "A"; he noted that ordinarily he would have declined to review it due to its short length, but said "what a glorious ten seconds it is". Benigno and Poniewozik criticized the sanitization of "Forget You", but while the latter found it inferior to the original version, the former preferred Paltrow's deeper voice and graded the song "A". Rolling Stone's Erica Futterman felt the censorship of the song did not adversely affect its success, and deemed Paltrow's rendition "charming and sassy". Megan Vick of Billboard called it "the most exciting number" of the episode, and Stack went further in his praise: he bestowed a grade of "A+" and lauded it as "one of the most memorable and energetic Glee performances ever, thanks in no small part to Paltrow". Green told MTV that he was flattered by the cover, particularly as he was not aware Paltrow would perform it when granting Glee clearance. He called her performance "great", and commented that he had not been aware she was such an accomplished vocalist.

Benigno and Stack praised the choreography of "Make 'Em Laugh", but both graded it lower than "Forget You", at a "B" and "B+" respectively. Futterman called the recreation an "impressive feat", but likened it to hallucinatory Britney Spears covers in the episode "Britney/Brittany" in that it "stands alone better than it fits into the plot." Vick was critical of the performance, observing that Glee covers from musicals often introduce classic songs to viewers with a modern twist, an element which was absent in "Make 'Em Laugh". The Chicago cover also left some critics wanting, and Futterman, The Wall Street Journal's Raymund Flandez and The Atlantic's Patrick Burns all found its choreography lacking. Fallon suggested that Glee should be wary of overusing recreations, having already done so in "The Power of Madonna", "Britney/Brittany" and "The Rocky Horror Glee Show", and VanDerWerff criticized the performances as "outright plagiarism, not homage".

Benigno and Futterman compared "Singin' in the Rain / Umbrella" favorably to mash-ups performed in the preceding episode. Benigno graded it "B", though he said that by using "Singin' in the Rain" as the chorus, the song lacked catharsis, a sentiment echoed by Flandez, who praised the costumes, props and staging, but wished the rendition had had more "bite" and "attitude". Futterman described it as a "buoyant and catchy homage to the old and the new [that] perfectly captures Glee's musical spirit". In contrast, Vick felt the song could not compare to the previous episode's mash-ups. She deemed the staging implausible, questioning how a glee club in financial difficulty could afford elaborate water features for a rehearsal number. Stack was willing to overlook such improbability; he wrote that he loved the mash-up and graded it an "A−". Amy Reiter of the Los Angeles Times appreciated the choreography and the manner in which "Paltrow's sassiness undercuts [Morrison's] overripe sweetness", and named it potentially her favorite group number of the season.
