= Red Frogs =

Australian Christian charitable organisation

- Founded: 1997
- Founder: Andy Gourley
- Type: Christian charitable organisation
- Website: redfrogs.com.au

Red Frogs is a Christian youth charity founded in Australia and run by volunteers known as the 'Red Frogs Crew' that has expanded into at least nine other countries including Canada, New Zealand and South Africa. The volunteers participate in events that are attended by school leavers and university students such as schoolies week, as well as sporting events and concerts, providing safeguarding actions.

Since 2004, confectionary company Allen's has donated over 24 tonnes of their red frog lollies every year. Red Frogs is the largest harm reduction program in Australia.

== History ==
In 1997, founder Andy Gourley attended schoolies week on the Gold Coast with some of his friends and saw binge drinking and illicit drug taking place. Gourley gathered a group of young volunteers to provide chaplaincy support for the school leavers. They took a packet of red frogs bought from a local convenience store to a party and found it was a "game-changer" in connecting with the young people they wanted to support.

In 2004, a sponsorship arrangement was made with Allen's who now donate all 24 tonnes of the lollies used by Red Frogs in Australia each year. A Nestlé spokesperson said in 2017, "It’s a huge commitment for us, but it’s also a no-brainer. Helping kids stay safe is really important."

In a 2010 interview, Gourley stated: "Schoolies to me... really [is] safeguarding a generation of Australia's next leaders... It's building a fence at the top of the cliff, rather than being an ambulance at the bottom."

== Activities ==
Schoolies week is the Red Frog Crew's main event each year. The week-long holiday can often be a place of binge drinking and increased risk of sexual assault, hospitalisation, and arrests. Red Frogs volunteers offer to walk schoolies home at the end of a night, help those who are sick, cook pancakes, visit and clean rooms, and offer emotional support. Over 1,500 volunteers provide safety and support across various Schoolies locations. They work in partnership with police and other agencies to help ensure a safe event.

The Red Frogs Crew are involved with universities at Orientation Week, events, and residential colleges. They also volunteer at sporting events, concerts, and music festivals, offering food, water, sunscreen, red frogs, and a supportive presence, serving and safeguarding around 1.4 million young people per year.

Red Frogs has a 1300 hotline number, which the organisation promotes in schools throughout the year as a kind of lifeline for those in need of support. Since 2018, they have also used a mobile app for students to request assistance from a volunteer at Schoolies. It was noted by the Queensland Parliament that at the 2024 Schoolies Festival on the Gold Coast, there were 3,508 calls to the hotline and 2,500 requests through the app.

== Impact ==
The organisation's own 2023 impact report found that they had supported over 1.2 million people throughout the year with AUD$5.3 million worth of volunteer hours at Schoolies festivals. They also educated over 54,000 school students through 612 high school education programs and supported over 1,000 university events. Independent advisory company Pluri undertook a 2004 survey in New Zealand that "highlighted the tangible impact the organisation had on student wellbeing, connection, decision making and safety at events".

Queensland Minister for Youth Sam O'Connor said in the state's parliament that the organisation "is a great value-for-money harm reduction measure that is making a difference". Writing in The Daily Telegraph, Gillian McNally said Red Frogs Australia has "helped change the face of Schoolies, shaping a peer-led culture where mates look out for mates." The Australian Government said it would partner with the organisation in its digital safety campaign about the risks of alcohol consumption while travelling, launched in response to the 2024 Laos methanol poisoning.

Andy Gourley was a finalist in the "Local Hero" category for the 2015 Queensland Australian of the Year awards for his role in founding the organisation.

In 2019, University of Queensland researchers undertook a study of Red Frogs' pre-Schoolies education program delivered to over 30,000 year 12 students and found "tentative evidence that educating high school leavers on safe partying behaviours through a brief intervention may result in small reductions in problematic alcohol use and improved wellbeing."

== International expansion ==
Red Frogs has spread to at least nine countries, including Bali, Fiji, and Vanuatu. In the United Kingdom, they have been active at the University of Aberdeen in Scotland and Cardiff University in Wales.

Red Frogs was introduced to Canada in 2011 and as of 2023 was operating on 17 university campuses across the country, offering water, snacks, and walks home during frosh week. They have also been involved in festivals and concerts, and in August 2023 piloted a program in downtown Windsor, Ontario as a "friendly force" and referral program.

Red Frogs South Africa launched in 2013, safeguarding at festivals and other youth focused events, as well as on university campuses. They promote safe partying and provide support on the streets and through a hotline phone number for what is known as "Matric Rage", school-leavers' end of year celebrations in coastal towns including Plettenberg Bay and Jeffreys Bay.

Red Frogs New Zealand has been operating since 2015, initially through Australian volunteers before establishing locally based operations with two staff and over 400 volunteers. They supported around 180,000 people on New Year's Eve, with Mental Health Minister Matt Doocey saying the charity was "vitally important" in ensuring people are safe. In November 2025, Red Frogs launched a school safety pilot program in Central Otago.

In September 2024, the Nashville Mayor's Office of Nightlife officially welcomed Red Frogs to the United States city. Volunteers set up a permanent post on Lower Broadway with the aim of helping partygoers get home safely. They have since been involved in the city's New Year's Eve events as well as CMA Fest and other concerts.
