= Blur =

Blur, Blurry, Blurring, Blurred or Blurr, may refer to:

== Optics and images ==
- Bokeh, the aesthetic quality of the out-of-focus parts of an image
- Blur (photographic effect), including the following:
  - Box blur, a graphic-art effect
  - Defocus aberration, blurring of an image due to incorrect focus
  - Gaussian blur, a graphic-art effect
  - Motion blur, blurring of an image due to movement of the subject or imaging system
- Deblurring, process of removing blurring artifacts from images
- Fogging (censorship), censored blurring

== Arts, entertainment, and media ==
=== Fictional characters ===
- Red Blue Blur, or The Blur, an alternate identity for Clark Kent in Smallville
- The Atlanta Blur or The Blur, a character in the Marvel MAX comic Supreme Power
- Blurr (Transformers), Transformers fictional robot superheroes

=== Films ===
- Blurred (film), a 2002 Australian film
- Blurs (film), a 2011 Croatian film
- Blurr, a 2022 Indian horror thriller film by Ajay Bahl

=== Music ===
- Blur (band), an English rock band

==== Albums ====
- Blur (Blur album), a 1997 eponymous album by the band Blur
- Blur: The Best Of, a 2000 eponymous album by the band Blur
- Blur (Rachael Lampa album), a 2002 album by Rachael Lampa
- Blurr (EP), a 1993 EP by Unwritten Law; see Unwritten Law discography
- Blurrr, a 2025 album by Joanne Robertson

==== Songs ====
- "Blur", a song by Britney Spears from the album Circus
- "Blur", a song by Imagine Dragons from the album Mercury – Acts 1 & 2
- "Blur", a song by Johnny Orlando
- "Blur", a song by MØ from the album Forever Neverland
- "Blur", a song by Taeyeon from the EP Letter to Myself
- "Blur", a song by Wage War from the album Stigma
- "Blur", a song by We Came As Romans from their self-titled album
- "Blur", a song by Wretch 32, featured on the soundtrack of FIFA 13
- "Blurry", a 2001 song by Puddle of Mudd from the album Come Clean
- "Blurry" (Stand Atlantic song), a 2020 song by Stand Atlantic from the album Pink Elephant
- "Blurry (Out of Place)", a song by Crown the Empire from the album Sudden Sky

=== Other uses in arts, entertainment, and media ===
- Blur (video game), a 2010 arcade racing game
- Blur: How to Know What's True in the Age of Information Overload, a book by journalists Tom Rosenstiel and Bill Kovach
- The Blur, a member of DP 7, part of Marvel Comics' New Universe line

== Other uses ==
- Blur, in computing, a loss of focus
- Blur (browser extension), formerly DoNotTrackMe, now Ironvest
- Blurring, a form of trademark dilution
- Blur Group, an online marketplace provider
- Blur Studio, a graphics and video effects company

== See also ==
- Motoblur, a Motorola Android UI
- Blurred (disambiguation)
