= Teenage Dream (Katy Perry song) =

2010 single by Katy Perry

Single by Katy Perry

from the album Teenage Dream
- Released: July 23, 2010
- Studio: Conway Recording Studios, (Hollywood, California); Playback Recording Studios (Santa Barbara, California)
- Genre: Electropop; power pop
- Length: 3:47
- Label: Capitol
- Songwriters: Katy Perry; Lukasz Gottwald; Max Martin; Benjamin Levin; Bonnie McKee
- Producers: Dr. Luke; Benny Blanco; Max Martin

Katy Perry singles chronology
"California Gurls" (2010)	"Teenage Dream" (2010)	"Firework" (2010)

Music video
- "Teenage Dream" on YouTube

"Teenage Dream" is a song by American singer Katy Perry. It was released as the second single from her third studio album of the same name on July 23, 2010. She and Bonnie McKee co-wrote the track with its producers Dr. Luke, Max Martin, and Benny Blanco. The track was recorded at Conway Recording Studios, based in Hollywood, Los Angeles, and Playback Recording Studios, based in Santa Barbara, California. McKee describes "Teenage Dream" as a throwback song to the euphoric feelings of being in love as a teenager while Perry described the song as reminiscent of her youth. Musically, "Teenage Dream" is a mid-tempo pop song with a retro sound. It is styled in the genres of power pop and electropop, while taking influence from other genres such as disco and pop rock. Perry starts the song in a high-pitched voice while her vocals grow stronger as the song progresses. Lyrically, "Teenage Dream" discusses being with a lover who makes one feel young again.

Critics were initially divided about the song at release. However, the song has received retrospective critical acclaim with Glamour calling it "one of the best pop songs of all time." The song topped the US Billboard Hot 100, becoming Perry's third number-one single on that chart, and her second consecutive number-one single after "California Gurls". It also reached number one in Ireland, New Zealand, and Slovakia. "Teenage Dream" entered the top ten in 13 countries in total. "Teenage Dream" has been certified Diamond in the United States, Australia, and Canada, and Gold or Platinum in ten additional countries. The song has sold 12 million copies worldwide.

A music video for the song was filmed in various locations around Perry's hometown in Santa Barbara, California and was directed by Yoann Lemoine (a.k.a. Woodkid). The video showcases Perry being in love with her high school boyfriend. Perry has performed the song on Saturday Night Live, the 2010 Teen Choice Awards, 53rd Annual Grammy Awards, the Super Bowl XLIX halftime show, and in every one of her concert tours since the California Dreams Tour. "Teenage Dream" was nominated for the Grammy Award for Best Female Pop Vocal Performance, becoming Perry's third nomination in the category. The song has been covered numerous times, appearing on American Idol, The Voice, and Glee. Billboard ranked "Teenage Dream" among the "500 Best Pop Songs of All Time" in 2023 at number 38, and Rolling Stone ranked among "The 250 Greatest Songs of the 21st Century So Far" in 2025 at number 55.

== Background and writing ==
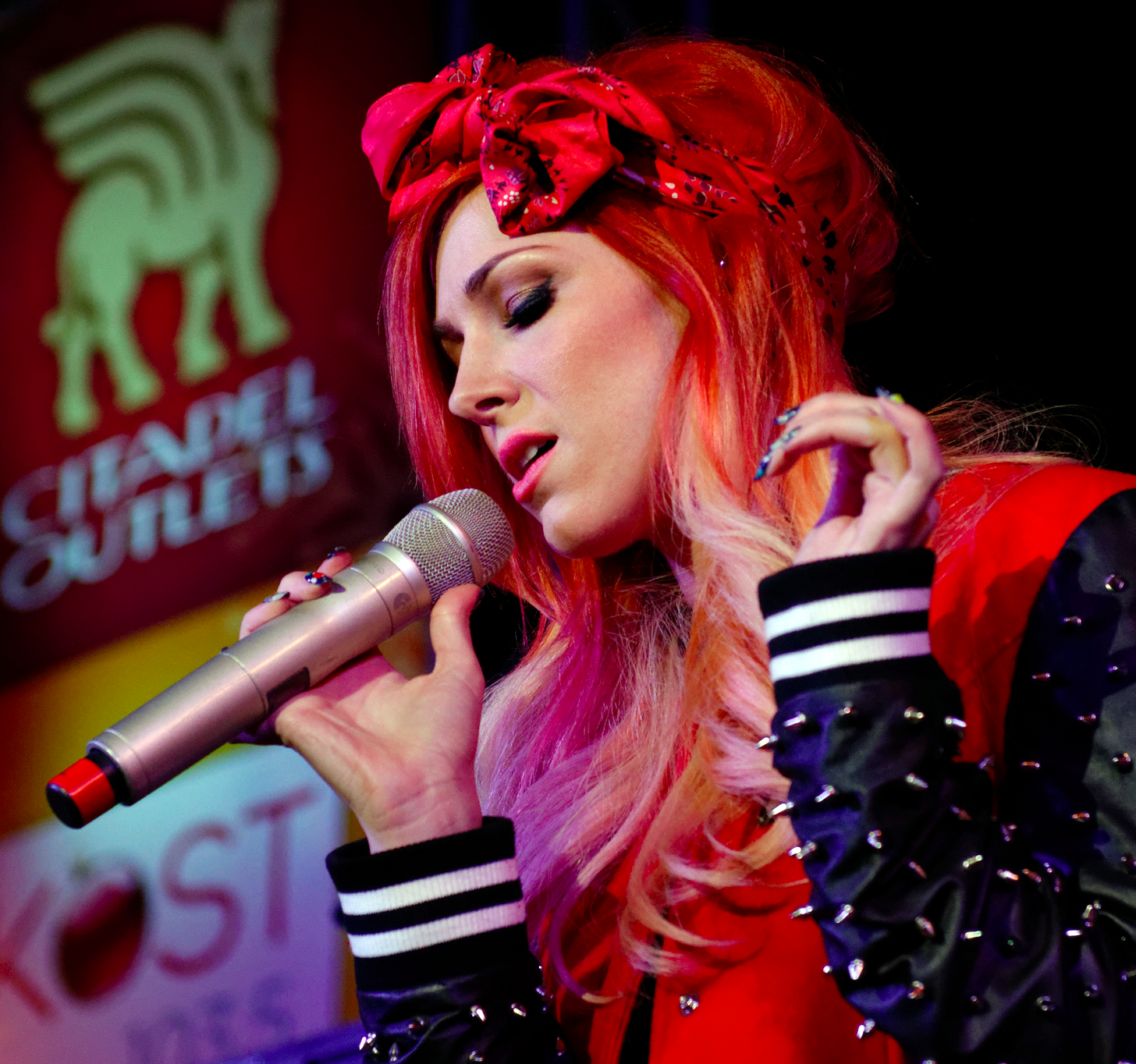
Bonnie McKee (pictured) co-wrote "Teenage Dream".

When Perry and McKee first met in 2004, they both were "really into Lolita" and "had a mutual fascination with the adolescent state of mind." They explored the themes in their first records: Perry wrote One of the Boys, which touched on the early stages of discovering that boys could be more than friends, whereas McKee wrote "Confessions of a Teenage Girl", which was about using sexual power to one's advantage. For the Teenage Dream sessions, Perry and McKee had a "forever young" idea in mind. Perry at first wrote a lyric about Peter Pan, but they later deemed it as "too young" since "we wanted it to have more edge, more sex." Another version included the lines "And the next thing you know / You're a mom in a minivan", which made them laugh uncontrollably for an hour. There was a final version that was based around the metaphor of "trying me on" comparing clothes to sex, in a similar manner to Madonna's 1985 single "Dress You Up". It was rejected by the producers, as McKee explained, "Luke always makes us 'Benny Proof' everything. He says that if Benny doesn't get it, America won't get it." Blanco showed them the Teenagers's 2007 single "Homecoming" and asked them to write in a similar style. McKee said that "[We] looked at each other with dread, knowing we had to start all over again..... We were both so over it we just called it a night."

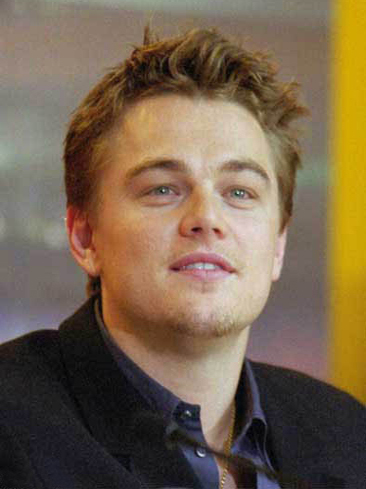
Leonardo DiCaprio was one of the inspirations for "Teenage Dream".

McKee continued working on the song the following days. She explained, "I thought about my own adolescent years, my own first love. I thought about watching Baz Luhrmann's 'Romeo and Juliet' and putting on a little mini disco ball light and just dreaming of Leo. I thought about me and my friends sitting around at slumber parties in the '90s, giddy even just THINKING about boys..... I thought about what Benny said and I listened to the song again, and I was like the Teenagers..... that's such a great word, Teenager. It is a very descriptive word; it packs a lot of emotion and imagery into three syllables..... I couldn't believe after all of our agonizing over 'youth' themes, that we had overlooked such an obvious one – the teenage condition." The following week, Perry invited McKee, Luke, and Martin to write in her hometown of Santa Barbara, California. McKee tried to approach Luke about her idea, but he was upset about the amount of time he had spent working in the chorus, so he banned them from changing it. They started working on the verses, where Perry had already prepared most of the imagery.

Perry described the process as "a very pure moment for me" and continued saying, "[It was] where I started my creative juices. And also it kind of exudes this euphoric feeling because everybody remembers what their teenage dreams were — all the girls that were on your poster walls." After she recorded the vocals, McKee pulled Luke and Martin aside and told them her idea, to which they responded, "Well why didn't you say that in the first place?". The chorus was rewritten, and the line "Skin tight jeans" was taken from the early "trying me on" version. When the final version was finished, McKee said, "We were all so pumped that it had paid off. I remember Max sitting back and saying 'I wish we could bottle this feeling'. It was really magical." Perry commented that even though the song was rewritten many times, she was "so happy to finally get somewhere that we all agreed on" after it was finished. During an interview in June 2010, Perry confirmed "Teenage Dream" as the second single from the album, and said that the song was about "kind of like feeling that way when you were a teenager: really emotional, really invested..... It's intense being in love and being a teenager." After confirming that "Teenage Dream" was also the title of the album, she explained that it was a throwback to her teenage years, as she thought back to her youth while contemplating marriage to her then-boyfriend Russell Brand. She added, "To me, this year is pretty heavy. I am going to be getting married and putting out this record, and there is so much going on that it's nice to think of those young dreams."

== Composition ==
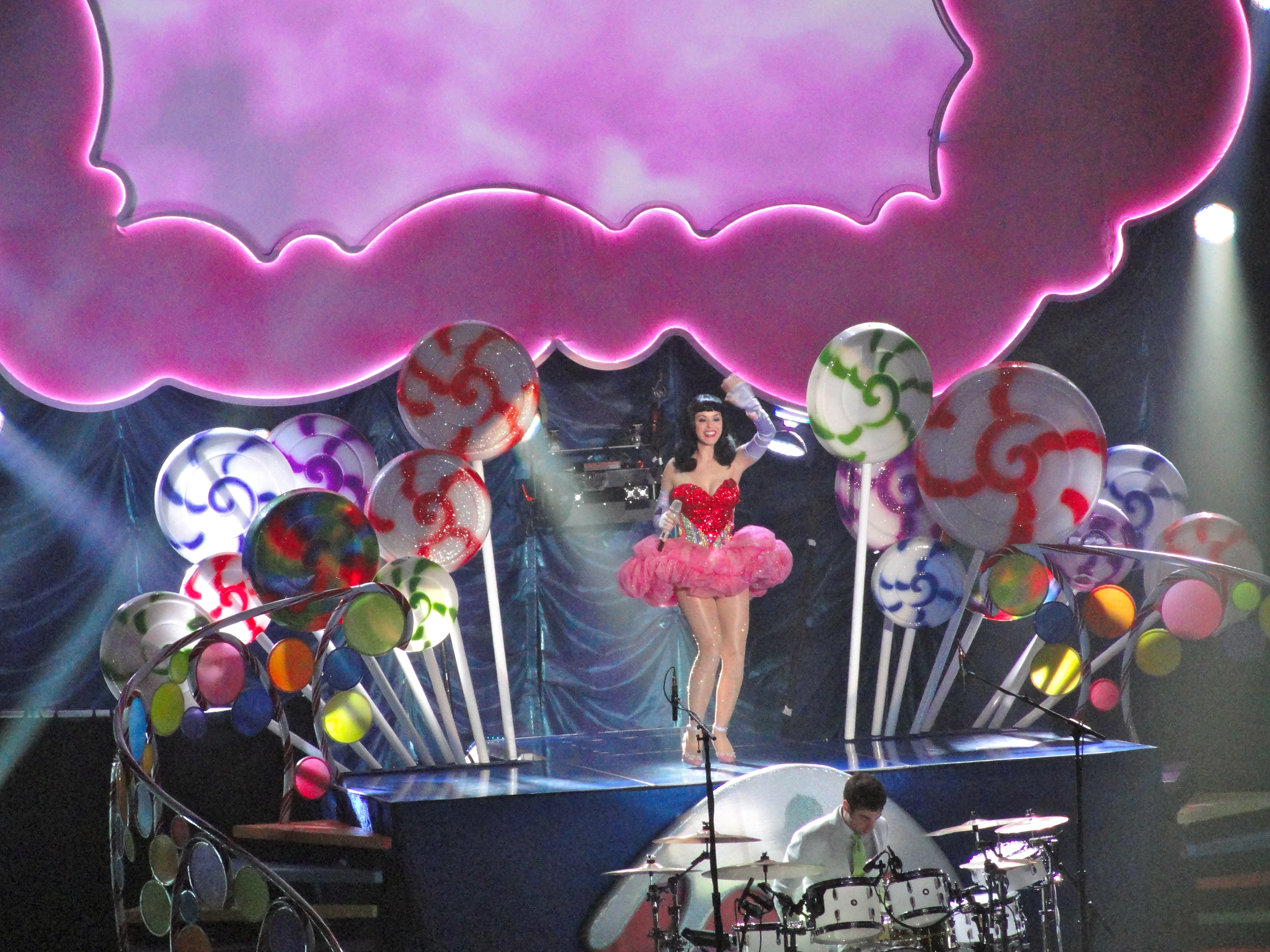
Perry performing "Teenage Dream" at the California Dreams Tour

"Teenage Dream" is a midtempo love song with a strong beat that follows the retro sound of previous single "California Gurls". It is predominantly a power pop and electropop song, which features influences of disco, pop rock, and rock music. Musicnotes published this song in the key of B♭ major, with a tempo of 120 beats per minute. It starts with the sequence of B♭–B♭_{2} played by a guitar. These intervals are played on guitar throughout the song, but with the addition of different bass notes from halfway through the first verse, the overall harmony can be heard as E♭maj_{7} – Gm – Fsus_{4}. The general chord progression of the song is made from the progression E♭ - Gm – F. Perry's vocals in the song span from the note of B♭_{3} to the note of F_{5}. The song starts with relatively high vocals, with Perry singing in head voice; it also continues during the second verse. Amos Barshad of New York said that "if not for a bluntly muscular chorus ('You! ..... make! ..... me!'), [the song] is nearly a ballad." The lyrics refer to being with a lover that makes one feel like a teenager. According to James Montgomery of MTV, the lyrics refer to being in love, and about the feelings of commitment and security that it brings. They also talk about taking the relationship further in lines such as: "Let's go all the way tonight / No regrets, just love / We can dance until we die / You and I / We'll be young forever".

In a 2014 Slate article, composer Owen Pallett analyzed the song using music theory to explain its success. He focused on two factors: the tonal interplay of the chords and melody, and Perry's use of syncopation in her vocals. "This song is all about suspension—not in the voice-leading 4–3 sense, but in the emotional sense, which listeners often associate with 'exhilaration,' being on the road, being on a roller coaster, travel," he explained.

That suspension is created "simply, by denying the listener any I chords," Pallett explains. After the first few lines, the B♭ tonic chord that repeats throughout the song is offset by bass notes that give it a more dominant 7th feel. "The I chord will never appear again," he observes. At the same time, however, Perry begins singing the melody on that note, and returns to it frequently, even when it clashes with the dominant V chord as she sings "feel like I'm living a". "[T]he vocal melody establishes the key so clearly that there is no doubt ... Her voice is the sun and the song is in orbit around it," he concludes. "The insistence of the tonic in the melody keeps your ears' eyes fixed on the destination, but the song never arrives there. Weightlessness is achieved. Great work, songwriters!" Pallett notes other classic pop songs, such as Fleetwood Mac's "Dreams" and Coldplay's "Viva la Vida", that employ the same device.

"The second key to this song's Enormous Chart Success," Pallett continues, "has to do with the weighting of the melody lines." Perry begins singing each verse on the beat ("you think I'm pretty ...") but then falls off it before the end of the first line ("... makeup on"), syncopating the melody, and creating additional tension. "Her lines dovetail elegantly into each other. This contributes to the feeling of suspension that I mentioned above. As listeners, we're waiting for her to get to the point." Pallett says she does indeed do this in the pre-chorus when she accentuates the imperatives ("Let's go all the way tonight ...") by returning to the beat. Pallett then calls it "genius" that the chorus itself inverts the weighting of the verses, as the line "You make me feel like I'm living a teenage dream" goes from off beat to on and then back again, in a single line.

Further, Pallett writes, in the song's bridge, Perry adds more complexity to the song—and makes it more memorable, in his opinion—by taking the simple step of singing the "let you put your hands on me in my skintight jeans" lyrics entirely on beat, including the reiteration of the song's title. "How brilliant. The title of the song is rhythmically weighted two ways—it's like a flank attack. Two sides of the same face. You WILL remember the name of this song."

== Critical reception ==
Critics were divided by "Teenage Dream" at the time of its release. Craig Marks of Billboard said that along with "California Gurls", the songs "are textbook summer singles whose ingenious pop hooks and zillion-dollar drum tracks are stamped with Perry's knack for a memorable line and frothy, gum-snapping persona." Billboard named "Teenage Dream" as the "second best song of the 2010s so far" in 2015. James Montgomery of MTV commented that "Teenage Dream" showed a "definite change of pace for Perry. While it's still as saccharine sweet as her previous hits, there's also a rather, well, mature quality to it (despite the title)." Amos Barshad of New York said, "Right now, it's feeling a bit too earnest, and not nearly as catchy as the follow-up single from Perry's first album ('Hot n Cold', most definitely still a jam). That said, we are now mentally preparing ourselves for its ubiquity." Alyssa Rosenberg of The Atlantic dismissed the lyrics as "simply annoying and incoherent" and added that "the hook and chorus aren't nearly compelling enough to pull me back into it."

== Retrospective acclaim and legacy ==
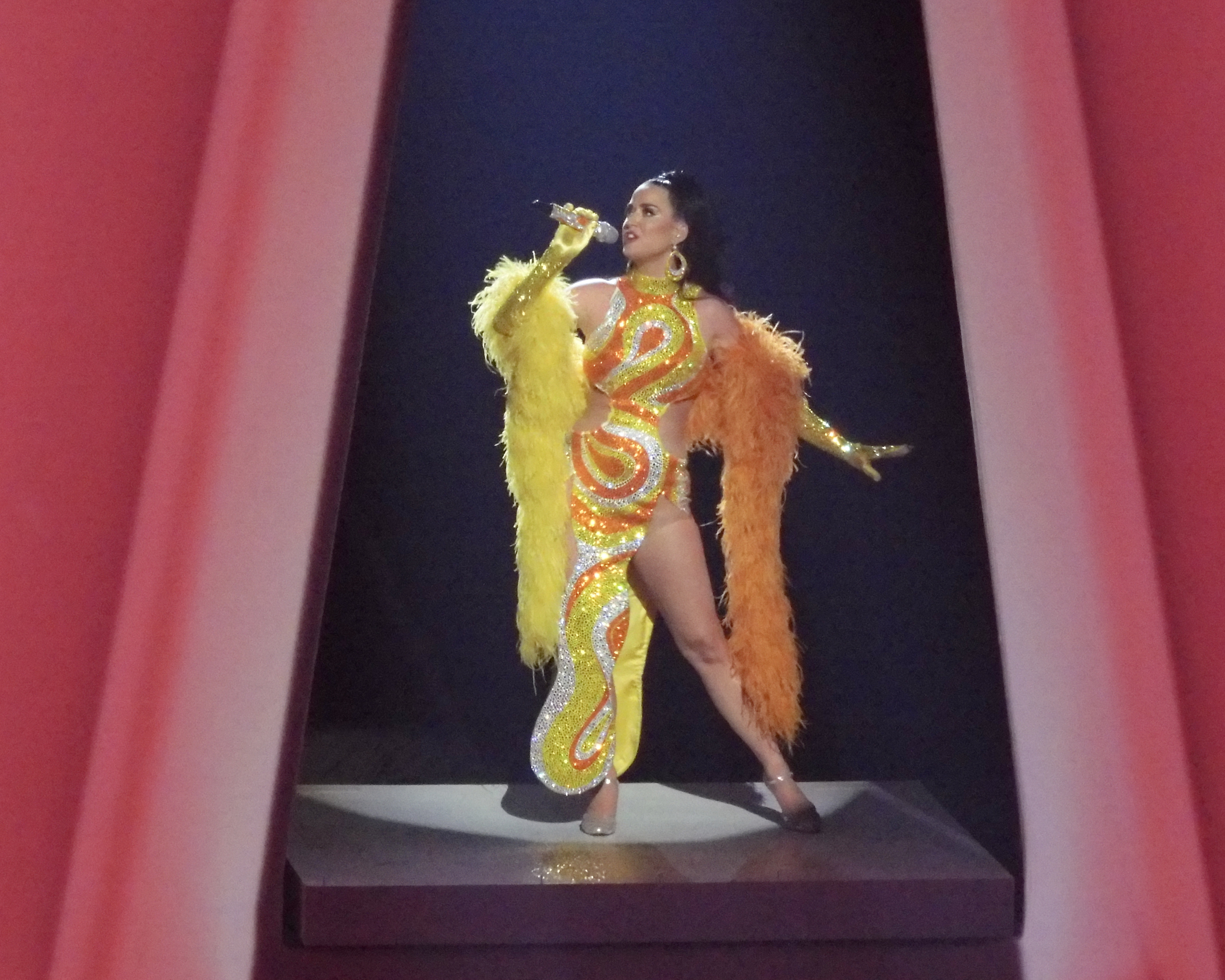
Perry performing "Teenage Dream" at her Play residency

Retrospectively, the song has received acclaim, appearing in several critics' lists of Perry's best songs. Entertainment Weekly praised the song, saying it captures "all the contact-high euphoria of falling in love for the first time [...] minus the awkward bits of being an actual adolescent [...] in one pure, radiant blast of let’s-go-all-the-way-tonight bliss." Rolling Stone ranked it number four on their "Best Singles of 2010" list and The Village Voice ranked it 14th on its 38th annual Pazz & Jop critics' poll.

In 2014, Gawker ranked it the best number-one single of the last ten years while Pitchfork ranked it the 35th best song released in the first half of the 2010s and the 102nd best song of the 2010s. In 2018, NPR listed "Teenage Dream" at number 63 on their list of the 200 Greatest Songs by Women of the 21st Century. Billboard ranked the song at number two on their list of 20 best songs of the 2010s so far in 2015, and also placed it on their list of The 100 Songs That Defined The Decade in 2019. uDiscover Music ranked "Teenage Dream" at number eight in the list of 20 Katy Perry songs that shaped 21st-century pop music.

Slate wrote that the widespread success of the song "seems to mystify all the Katy Perry haters in the world". Metro called "Teenage Dream" a perfect pop song, further wrote that "there are, really, few songs that you could ever class as perfect, and the choices are obviously almost always subjective, but Katy Perry's 'Teenage Dream' is perhaps one no-one can argue with". Glamour compared the song to Michael Jackson's "Thriller", Madonna's "Like a Prayer", and Britney Spears' "...Baby One More Time" and called it "one of the best pop tunes ever crafted". New Zealand musician Lorde cited "Teenage Dream" as an influence, stating "When I put that song on, I'm as moved as I am by anything by David Bowie, by Fleetwood Mac, by Neil Young. It lets you feel something you didn't know you needed to feel... There's something holy about it". Country musician Maren Morris said she grew up listening to "Teenage Dream" and called the song "one of the greatest songs of all time".

Billboard ranked "Teenage Dream" among the "500 Best Pop Songs of All Time" in 2023 at number 38.

== Commercial performance ==
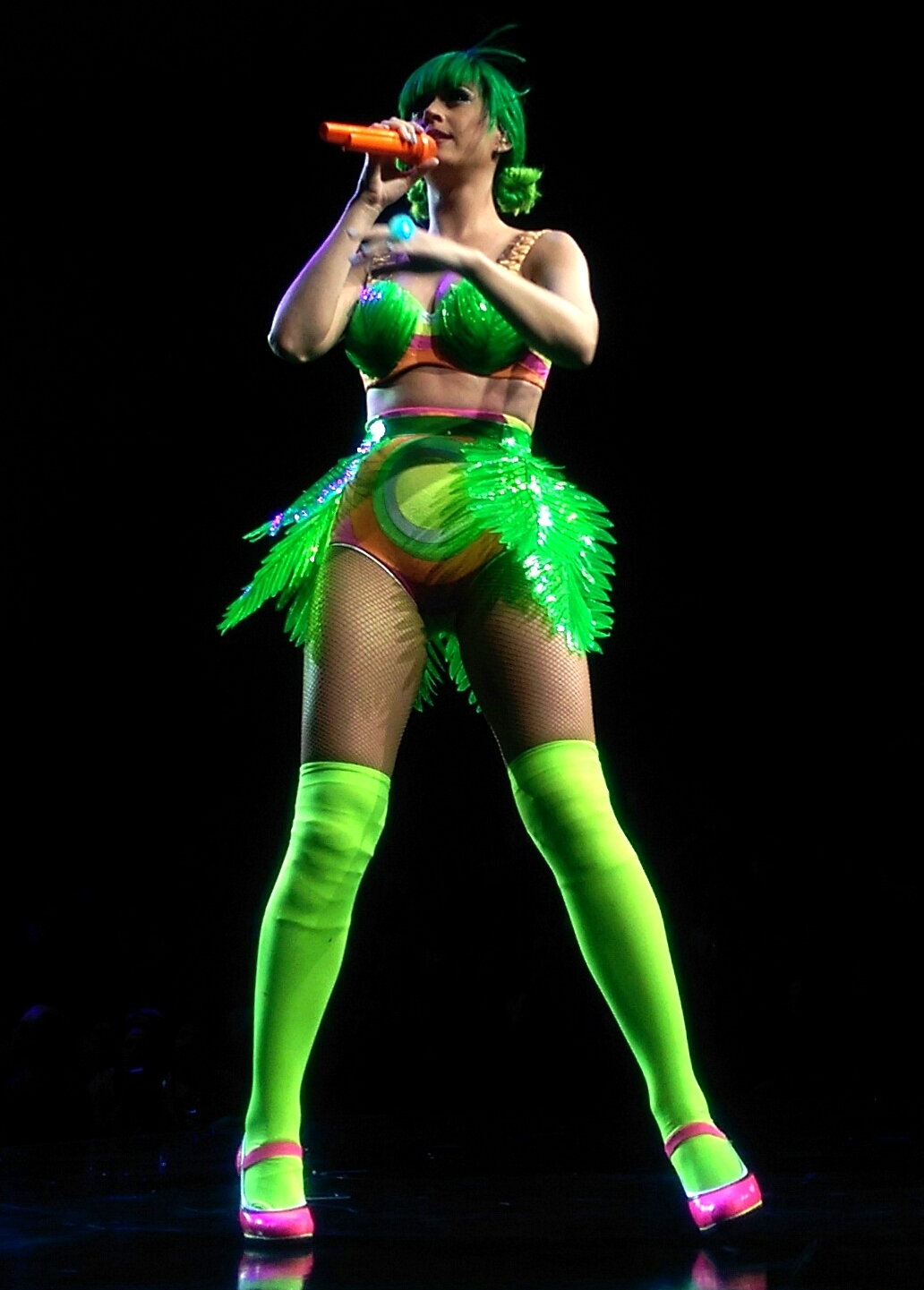
Perry performing "Teenage Dream" at the Prismatic World Tour

"Teenage Dream" debuted at number 20 on the US Billboard Hot 100 dated August 7, 2010, becoming the week's Hot Shot debut. It also debuted on the Hot Digital Songs chart at number 11 with 84,000 downloads and on the Radio Songs chart at number 75. According to Nielsen Broadcast Data Systems, "Teenage Dream" set the record for most added song in a week with 64 new stations and 14.9 million plays. The following week, it jumped to number seven on the Hot 100, due to a radio audience of 29.5 million impressions and an increase of 183,000 downloads. On the issue dated September 18, 2010, the song topped the chart becoming her second consecutive number one-single and her third overall number one-single. As of July 2024, the song has been certified Diamond by the Recording Industry Association of America (RIAA) and sold 10 million copies only in the United States, becoming her sixth song reach this status.

The same week the song topped the charts in the US, it debuted at number 20 in the Canadian Hot 100. On the September 2 issue of the Canadian Digital Download Chart, "Teenage Dream" rose to number one, making it her third number one on that tally. It went to number one in New Zealand on the August 30 chart making it her third number one in New Zealand that year, preceded by "If We Ever Meet Again" with Timbaland in early 2010 and "California Gurls". Overall the song remained at the top for four weeks in New Zealand. It was her fourth number one overall achieving this with "I Kissed a Girl" in 2008. On September 5, 2010, "Teenage Dream" debuted on the UK Singles Chart at number two selling over 86,000 units in its debut week. It was kept off the top spot by the release of Olly Murs' debut single "Please Don't Let Me Go". The following week it stayed at number two behind Alexandra Burke's "Start Without You", before moving down to number three the following week. The song reached number one on the Scottish Singles Chart.

Internationally, the song met a well commercial success, topping in Slovakia and reaching the top five in Austria, Croatia, Bulgaria and Israel, top ten ten in Germany, Switzerland and Italy, top twenty in Spain, Belgium, Finland and Denmark and top thirty in Brazil, Sweden and Hungary. In France, although it failed to enter in the top 50 from the main chart, the French Singles Chart, the song reached the top ten in French Download Singles 50, at number 6, becoming her sixth top ten at the time. It entered at number 75 several months after its release in the French Singles Chart and stayed 6 weeks, becoming her shortest-running week until "Walking On Air" who stayed 5 weeks and debuted at number 25. As of May 2022, "Teenage Dream" has sold 12 million copies worldwide.

== Music video ==
=== Background and concept ===
Perry during a beach party in the music video for "Teenage Dream"

The music video for "Teenage Dream" was filmed in Santa Barbara, California, in July 2010, and was directed by Yoann Lemoine. Perry planned the concept along with the songwriters during the sessions. Pictures from the shoot feature Perry kneeling in the sand looking at a man (played by Josh Kloss) wearing speedos, while others show her kissing the man in a hotel pool. She commented about the filming on her Twitter, saying, "That's a wrap for Teenage Dream! So gorgeous [.....] In my hometown. I got to cast all my friends in the new music vid for Teenage Dream = amazing insanity." The video features images of Perry in a car with a boyfriend, then, Perry is shown in a party with her friends, and the closing scene shows Perry kissing her boyfriend under the water. Perry was interviewed online via YouTube, where she talked about the music video. She said: "It is gonna be completely different from 'California Gurls.' With 'Teenage Dream' you'll see a very raw, almost vulnerable [side] ..... I had to wear so many less layers of makeup. I had to make out with a boy which was very traumatizing, I was kind of mean to him. I would be the one to call cut because I was like, 'oh I can't do this!' I feel so horrible. But I know it's a job. [Russell and I] understand what our work is."

=== Release ===
A lyric video with pictures was uploaded to Perry's YouTube account on July 26, 2010. A 30-second snippet was released on August 5, 2010. The clip showed Perry in a montage of locations around Santa Barbara including riding a late 1960s white BMW New Class convertible, kissing her love interest on the bed as well as the pool scene at the Sandman Inn on State Street in Santa Barbara, and dancing on the beach with her friends. The full video premiered on MTV on August 10, 2010, at 8:00 pm ET. Its UK premiere was at 10:45 pm on ITV2. The 4:39 minute-long official remix was posted on Katy Perry's Vevo account on YouTube on October 27, 2010, featuring an inserted party scene.

== Live performances ==
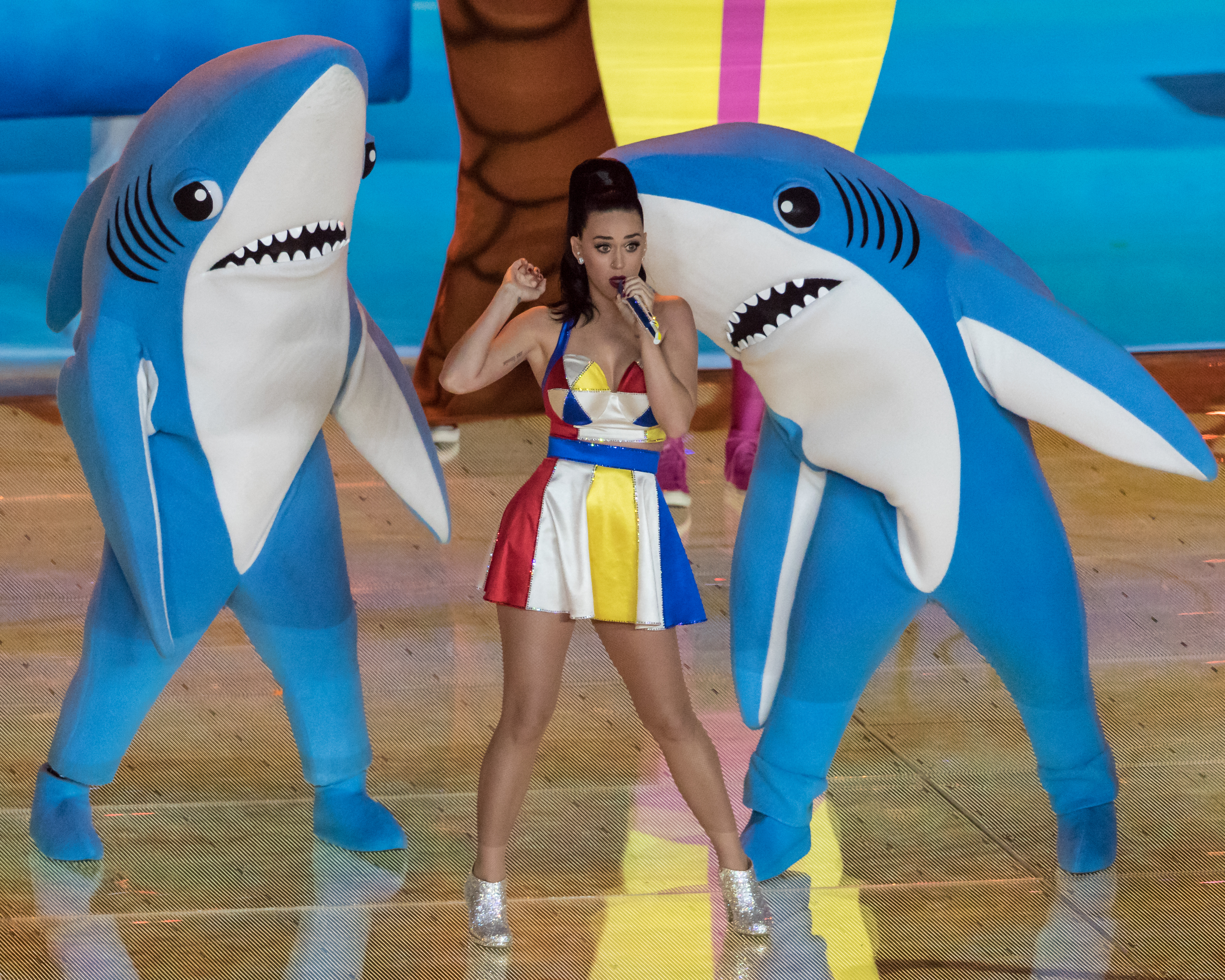
Perry performing "Teenage Dream" at the Super Bowl XLIX halftime show

Perry performed "Teenage Dream" at the MTV World Stage 2010 held in Sunway Surfbeach, Malaysia. Perry performed her songs "California Gurls", "Hot n Cold" and "Teenage Dream" on Sunrise in Australia. On August 9, 2010, she performed it as the opening song of the Teen Choice Awards when she was hosting the award ceremony. She then appeared and performed "Teenage Dream" on the Late Show with David Letterman and Today show. The same month, Perry traveled to Europe and performed the song on The Album Chart Show in the UK, on Le Grand Journal in France and on UK chat show Alan Carr: Chatty Man. On September 25, 2010, she was the musical guest and performed the song on Saturday Night Live. In October 2010, she performed the song on Wetten, dass..? in Germany. Perry performed the song with actor Darren Criss for the first time on the Trevor Project Live on December 5, 2010.

On February 13, 2011, Perry performed "Teenage Dream" at the 53rd Annual Grammy Awards. The song was featured on the set list of the California Dreams Tour in 2011 as the opening act of the show. The show begins with a video screen introduction which tells the story of a girl named Katy who lives in a colorless world wasting her life cutting meat for a mean old butcher. One night, Perry escapes her dreadful reality by falling asleep and visiting a vibrant candy land in search of her pet cat, Kitty Purry and also of the love of her life, the Baker's Boy, played by Nick Zano. Perry then appears on stage and starts performing "Teenage Dream" with her dancers, while wearing a white dress with spinning peppermints. For Obama's 2012 presidential candidacy, Perry performed several of her hit songs dressed as a ballot, including "Teenage Dream", "Firework", and "Wide Awake". Expressing solidarity for his campaign, the box next to Obama's name was shaded. For her 2014–15 The Prismatic World Tour and her 2017-2018 Witness: The Tour, "Teenage Dream" was included on the setlist. Teenage Dream will once again be on her setlist in The Lifetimes Tour (2025).

On May 25, 2014, Perry performed the song at BBC Radio 1's Big Weekend in Glasgow.

On February 1, 2015, Perry performed the song during the Super Bowl XLIX halftime show.

On May 27, 2017, Perry performed the song at BBC Radio 1's Big Weekend in Hull.

== Formats and track listings ==
- Digital download
1. "Teenage Dream" – 3:47
- CD single
1. "Teenage Dream" – 3:47
2. "Teenage Dream" (Instrumental) – 3:47
- Digital download – Remix EP
1. "Teenage Dream" (Vandalism Le Pop Mix) – 3:54
2. "Teenage Dream" (Vandalism V8 Vocal Remix) – 7:04
3. "Teenage Dream" (Manhattan Clique remix) – 6:40

== Credits and personnel ==
Credits adapted from Teenage Dream album liner notes.

- Katy Perry – songwriting, vocals
- Dr. Luke – songwriting, producer, drums, keyboards, programming
- Max Martin – songwriting, producer, drums, keyboards, programming
- Benny Blanco – songwriting, producer, drums, keyboards, programming
- Bonnie McKee – songwriting
- Emily Wright – engineering
- Sam Holland – engineering
- Tucker Bodine – assistant engineering
- Aniela Gottwald – assistant engineering
- Şerban Ghenea – mixing
- John Hanes – mix engineering
- Tim Roberts – assistant mix engineering
- Brian Gardner – mastering

== Charts ==
=== Weekly charts ===
Chart (2010–2011)	Peak position
Australia (ARIA)	2
Austria (Ö3 Austria Top 40)	2
Belgium (Ultratop 50 Flanders)	14
Belgium (Ultratop 50 Wallonia)	15
Brazil (Brasil Hot 100 Airplay)	25
Brazil (Billboard Hot Pop Songs)	1
Bulgaria Airplay (BAMP)	5
Canada Hot 100 (Billboard)	2
CIS Airplay (TopHit)	61
Croatia International Airplay (HRT)	2
Czech Republic Airplay (ČNS IFPI)	8
Denmark (Tracklisten)	13
Euro Digital Song Sales (Billboard)	1
European Hot 100 Singles (Billboard)	5
Euro Digital Tracks (Billboard); Clean album version	19
Euro Digital Tracks (Billboard); Explicit album version	4
Finland (Suomen virallinen lista)	14
France (SNEP)	75
Germany (GfK)	6
Hungary (Rádiós Top 40)	22
Ireland (IRMA)	1
Israel International Airplay (Media Forest)	5
Italy (FIMI)	9
Japan Hot 100 (Billboard)	19
Japan Adult Contemporary Airplay (Billboard)	78
Luxembourg Digital Song Sales (Billboard)	3
Mexico Anglo (Monitor Latino)	2
Netherlands (Dutch Top 40)	4
Netherlands (Single Top 100)	17
New Zealand (Recorded Music NZ)	1
Poland (Airplay Chart)	5
Poland (Dance Top 50)	42
Portugal Digital Song Sales (Billboard)	7
Russia Airplay (TopHit)	83
Scottish Singles Sales (Official Charts)	1
Slovakia Airplay (ČNS IFPI)	1
Spain (Promusicae)	12
Sweden (Sverigetopplistan)	21
Switzerland (Schweizer Hitparade)	8
UK Singles (Official Charts)	2
US Billboard Hot 100	1
US Adult Contemporary (Billboard)	8
US Adult Pop Airplay (Billboard)	1
US Dance Club Songs (Billboard)	1
US Dance Airplay (Billboard)	1
US Pop Airplay (Billboard)	1
US Rhythmic Airplay (Billboard)	9
Venezuela Pop Rock General (Record Report)	1

=== Year-end charts ===
Chart (2010)	Position
Australia (ARIA)	9
Austria (Ö3 Austria Top 40)	42
Belgium (Ultratop Flanders)	89
Brazil (Crowley)	17
Canada (Canadian Hot 100)	16
Croatia International Airplay (HRT)	78
European Hot 100 Singles	38
Germany (Media Control AG)	44
Hungary Singles Chart	48
Italian Singles Chart	67
Japanese Adult Contemporary Chart	22
Netherlands (Dutch Top 40)	27
Netherlands (Single Top 100)	91
New Zealand (Recorded Music NZ)	12
Sweden (Sverigetopplistan)	84
Switzerland (Schweizer Hitparade)	57
UK Singles (Official Charts Company)	32
US Billboard Hot 100	17
US Adult Contemporary (Billboard)	49
US Adult Top 40 (Billboard)	25
US Dance Club Songs (Billboard)	34
US Dance/Mix Show Airplay (Billboard)	18
US Mainstream Top 40 (Billboard)	15
US Rhythmic (Billboard)	50

Chart (2011)	Position
Canada (Canadian Hot 100)	61
US Billboard Hot 100	75
US Adult Contemporary (Billboard)	20
US Adult Top 40 (Billboard)	50

== Certifications and sales ==
Region	Certification	Certified units/sales
Australia (ARIA)	11× Platinum	770,000^{‡}
Austria (IFPI Austria)	Platinum	30,000^{*}
Brazil (Pro-Música Brasil)	Platinum	60,000^{‡}
Canada (Music Canada)	Diamond	800,000^{‡}
Denmark (IFPI Danmark)	Platinum	90,000^{‡}
Finland	Platinum	4,000
France (SNEP)	Platinum	200,000^{‡}
Germany (BVMI)	Gold	150,000^{^}
Italy (FIMI)	Gold	15,000^{*}
Mexico (AMPROFON)	Gold	30,000^{*}
New Zealand (RMNZ)	4× Platinum	120,000^{‡}
South Korea	—	74,645 (Note: South Korea sales figures as of December 2010.)
Spain (Promusicae)	Gold	30,000^{‡}
Sweden (GLF)	Gold	20,000^{‡}
United Kingdom (BPI)	3× Platinum	1,800,000^{‡}
United States (RIAA)	Diamond	10,000,000^{‡}
Ringtone
Canada (Music Canada)	Gold	20,000^{*}
Streaming
Greece (IFPI Greece)	Gold	1,000,000^{†}
Summaries
Worldwide	—	12,000,000 (Note: Worldwide sales figures as of May 2022.)
^{*} Sales figures based on certification alone.^{^} Shipments figures based on certification alone.^{‡} Sales+streaming figures based on certification alone.

== Release history ==
Release dates and formats for "Teenage Dream"
Region	Date	Format	Version(s)	Label	Ref.
Canada	July 23, 2010	Digital download	Original	Capitol	
United States	July 23, 2010	Digital download	Original	Capitol	
Australia	July 28, 2010	Digital download	Original	Capitol	
Austria	July 28, 2010	Digital download	Original	Capitol	
France	July 28, 2010	Digital download	Original	Capitol	
Germany	July 28, 2010	Digital download	Original	Capitol	
New Zealand	July 28, 2010	Digital download	Original	Capitol	
Norway	July 28, 2010	Digital download	Original	Capitol	
United States	August 3, 2010	Contemporary hit radio	Original	Capitol	
United States	August 24, 2010	Rhythmic contemporary radio	Original	Capitol	
United Kingdom	August 30, 2010	Digital download	Original	Capitol	
Various	September 3, 2010	Digital download	Remix EP	Capitol	
Germany	September 3, 2010	CD	Original; Instrumental	Capitol	
Italy	October 8, 2010	Radio airplay	Original	Polydor	
United Kingdom	October 26, 2010	CD	Original; Instrumental	EMI	

== Glee version ==
The Beelzebubs, a male a cappella group from Tufts University, covered "Teenage Dream" and gained prominence when it was used on the American musical television series Glee in the episode "Never Been Kissed". The Beelzebubs provided the arrangement and back-up vocals (recorded during September in New York City) for the performance, and actors playing students from the fictional Dalton Academy Warblers lip-synced to their vocals. The lead vocals were provided by Darren Criss, playing Blaine Anderson in the episode. Following the airing of the episode in the US on November 9, 2010, the track was released as a single credited to the Glee cast; the recording is also featured on Glee: The Music, Volume 4. The cover sold 55,000 copies through the iTunes Store on the first day, breaking the group's first-day sales record previously held by "Empire State of Mind". Selling 214,000 copies over the week, the song debuted at the eighth position on the Billboard Hot 100, surpassing "Don't Stop Believin'" for the highest first-week sales of any Glee song, and first top ten by Glee Cast on the chart since "Don't Stop Believin'". It remains the third best-selling recording in the show's history, having sold 652,000 copies in the United States. The song also charted at number ten in Canada, twenty-four in Australia, and eighteen in Ireland. The cover was included in a list of no particular order of the 210 best songs of 2010, published by the New York Post.

The song appears in three Glee albums: Glee: The Music, Volume 4, Glee: The Music Presents the Warblers and the live album Glee: The 3D Concert Movie. Criss covered the song again on Glee's season four episode, "The Break-Up", on October 4, 2012, with a slower, piano-only version. Unlike the original version, which was lip-synced, Criss sang this version live on set to capture the emotion of the performance.

=== Chart performance ===
Chart (2010-2011)	Peak position
Australia (ARIA)	24
Canada Hot 100 (Billboard)	10
Ireland (IRMA)	18
US Billboard Hot 100	8

=== Certifications ===
Region	Certification	Certified units/sales
United States (RIAA)	Gold	652,000

== See also ==
- List of number-one pop hits of 2010 (Brazil)
- List of number-one singles of 2010 (Ireland)
- List of number-one singles in 2010 (New Zealand)
- List of number-one singles and albums of 2010 (Scotland)
- List of Hot 100 number-one singles of 2010 (U.S.)
- List of Mainstream Top 40 number-one hits of 2010 (U.S.)
- List of number-one dance singles of 2010 (U.S.)
- List of number-one dance airplay hits of 2010 (U.S.)
- List of Hot Adult Top 40 Tracks number-one singles of 2010
- List of highest-certified singles in Australia
