= The Dalton Academy Warblers =

Fictional a cappella glee club in the show Glee

Background information
- Origin: Westerville, Ohio
- Genre: A cappella
- Years active: 2010–2015
- Label: Columbia Records
- Members: Grant Gustin (Sebastian); Dominic Barnes (Trent); Curt Mega (Nick); Riker Lynch (Jeff); Jon Hall (Beatboxer); Titus Makin Jr. (David); Eddy Martin (Thad); Nolan Gerard Funk (Hunter)
- Past members: Darren Criss (Blaine); Chris Colfer (Kurt); Telly Leung (Wes)

The Dalton Academy Warblers are a fictional a cappella glee club from the private school Dalton Academy, located in Westerville, Ohio. They were first introduced in the Glee television episode "Never Been Kissed". The episode also introduced recurring guest star Darren Criss as Blaine Anderson, lead singer and junior member of the group. Performing a cover version of Katy Perry's "Teenage Dream" with Criss on lead vocals, the actors who portrayed the Warblers lip synced to background vocals provided by the Beelzebubs, an all-male a cappella group from Tufts University in Medford, Massachusetts, who did not appear onscreen.

Tufts Beelzebubs voiced the background of the Warblers up until the end of the second season. When the Warblers returned in the season three episode "The First Time", Curt Mega, who sings lead on the Warblers track in this episode, mentioned the backgrounds were instead sung by "Jon Hall, Brock Baker and Luke Edgemon and some others", with the three named men having played on-screen Warblers in the second season. Some of the actors who played Warblers in the second season, including Hall and Mega, returned for the third. Glee character Blaine Anderson (Darren Criss) was lead singer of the Warblers during season two, and after he left Dalton Academy, Sebastian Smythe (Grant Gustin) took over the Warblers in season three.

Singles by the Warblers, with series stars Criss and Chris Colfer performing lead vocals, have collectively sold over 1.3 million copies through March 2011. Their first album, Glee: The Music Presents the Warblers, released by Columbia Records on April 19, 2011, debuted at number two on the US Billboard 200 and number one on Billboard's Soundtracks chart, selling 86,000 copies in its first week.
