= Blurred (play) =

Blurred is a play by Stephen Davis that focuses on schoolies week. It was written for young actors and first produced at Brisbane Festival Hall in 1999 for STAGE X as part of an initiative by the Queensland Performing Arts Trust. It was later turned into Blurred, a 2002 Australian film.

== Synopsis ==
Blurred is a one-act play that contains social comment and black comedy. The audience is faced with the brutal truth of Schoolies Week celebrations. While it raises continual laughter there is a sinister, threatening underlying beat. Between an opening and closing scene of a couple of old-hand predators, the action follows the journeys of several students to the Gold Coast, Queensland. The audience experience this rite of passage that has become a tradition for Australian school-leavers.
