= Telly Leung =

American actor and singer

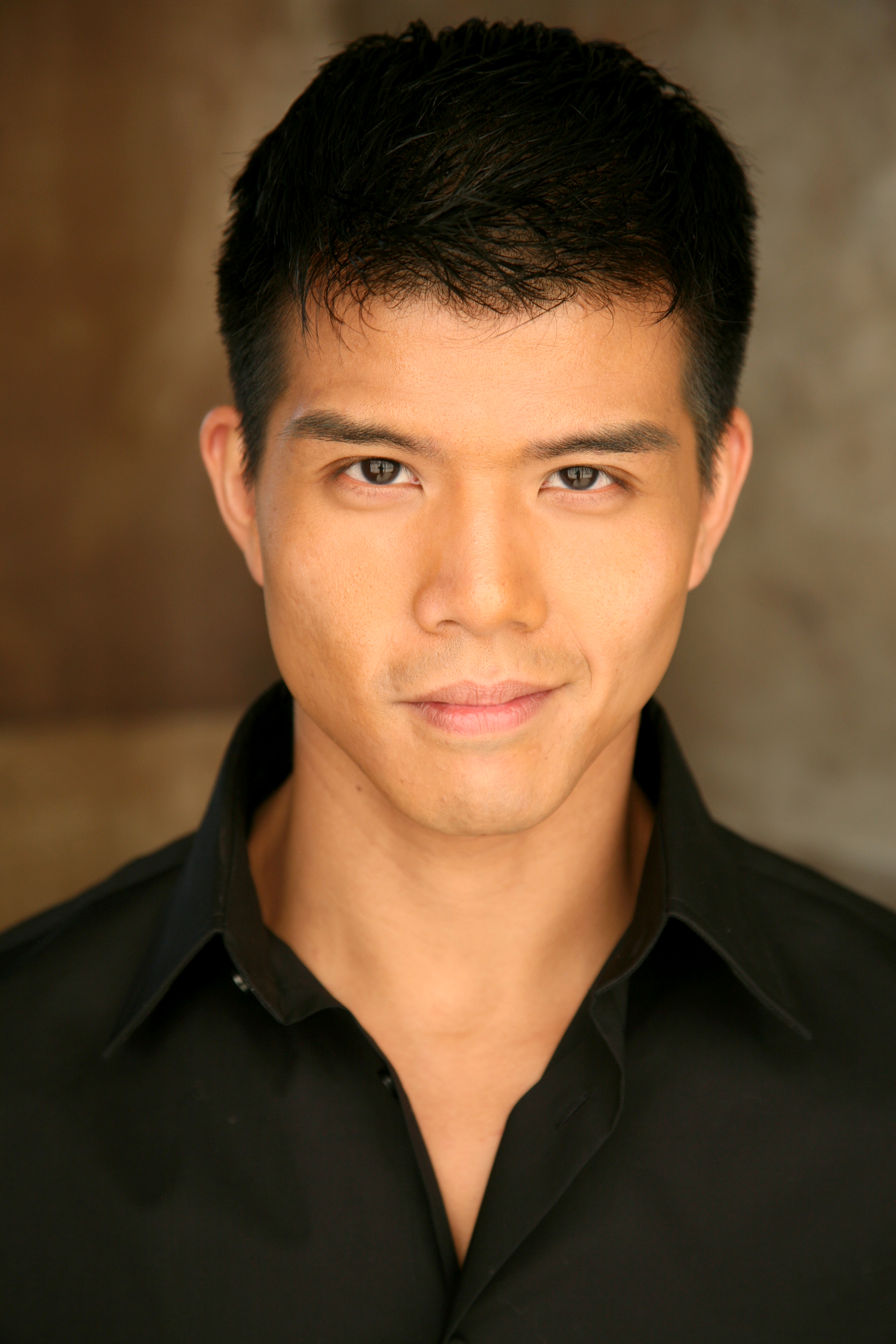
- Born: January 3, 1980 (age 46); New York City, U.S.
- Education: Carnegie Mellon University (BFA)
- Occupations: actor; singer; songwriter
- Spouse: James Babcock (m. 2016)
- Website: www.tellyleung.com

Telly Leung (born January 3, 1980) is an American actor, singer and songwriter. He is known for his work in musical theatre on Broadway and for his role as Wes, a member of the Dalton Academy Warblers on the Fox comedy-drama series Glee. In 2011, he starred in the Broadway revival of Godspell at the Circle in the Square Theatre.

Leung was named one of 12 Faces to Watch in 2012: Dance, Theater, Architecture, and Art by the Los Angeles Times.

== Early life and education ==
Leung was born January 3, 1980, and raised in New York City. He grew up in a traditional Chinese home in Bay Ridge, Brooklyn. He gained admission into New York's prestigious Stuyvesant High School, from which he graduated in 1998, alongside fellow actor Malcolm Barrett. It was at Stuyvesant that Leung seriously pursued theater, performing in high school productions of Pippin, Guys & Dolls, and West Side Story. His first professional job was as a featured performer in THE WB-TEAM 11, doing live and television promotional work for the WB Channel 11. After high school, Leung was accepted into Carnegie Mellon University's School of Drama.

== Career ==
=== Acting ===
During the summers off from college, Leung earned his Equity Card performing at the Pittsburgh Civic Light Opera and The MUNY in St. Louis. He worked with directors and choreographers including Tony Award winner Thommie Walsh, Larry Fuller, and Lee Roy Reams. It was also at CMU that he met fellow Broadway performer Billy Porter, who returned to his alma mater to direct the main stage production of Stephen Sondheim's Company. After casting Leung as Bobby in Company, Porter telephoned colleagues involved in the Broadway revival of Flower Drum Song and landed Leung an audition.

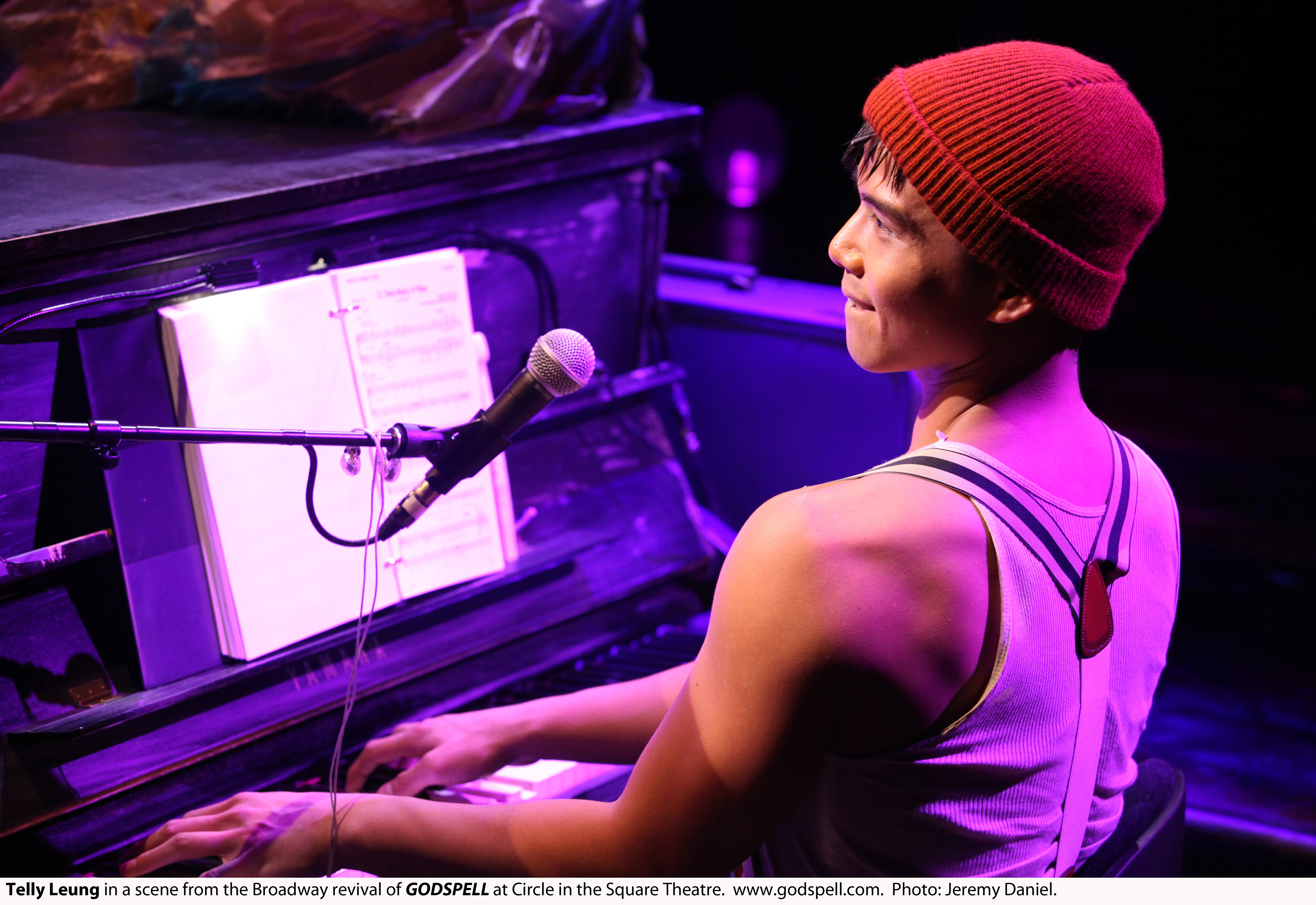
Leung performing in the 2011 Broadway Revival of Godspell

In the fall of 2002, Leung made his Broadway debut in the revival of Flower Drum Song, starring Lea Salonga, as a member of the ensemble and an understudy for Wang Ta. He later worked on Broadway with Sondheim in Roundabout Theatre's revival of Pacific Overtures in 2005. After Pacific Overtures, Leung originated the role of Boq in the Chicago company of the Stephen Schwartz musical Wicked. He moved back to New York in 2006 to take part in the Paper Mill Playhouse production of Godspell. He then returned to Broadway and performed as an ensemble member in the final run of Rent.

In 2007, he guest starred in an episode of Law & Order: Criminal Intent. Leung was a member of the final company of Rent – and made his film debut as part of the ensemble in Rent: Filmed Live on Broadway. He had a recurring role in the musical comedy-drama series Glee from 2010 to 2011, portraying the role of Wes, a member of the Dalton Academy Warblers.

Leung appeared in the Broadway revival of Godspell at the Circle in the Square Theatre. He reprised his role from the Paper Mill production as the "All Good Gifts" soloist. He was a featured performer in the world premiere of the musical Allegiance at the Old Globe Theatre in San Diego. The production premiered in September 2012, with Lea Salonga and George Takei also in the cast. In 2014, Leung appeared in the play The World of Extreme Happiness at Goodman Theatre in Chicago. He went on to star in the co-production at the Manhattan Theatre Club in February 2015.

In October 2015, Leung returned to Broadway in the musical Allegiance at the Longacre Theatre alongside co-stars George Takei and Lea Salonga. He then went on to perform in the acapella musical In Transit. Leung played the titular character of the Broadway production of Aladdin, having started his run on June 13, 2017.

In 2022, Leung directed Theatre Raleigh's production of Yellow Face.

In August 2022, it was announced that Leung was cast in a new, recurring role for the third season of Max television series Warrior.

=== Music ===
In 2005, Leung released an original EP titled Getaway on Mopptopp Records. His first solo LP, I'll Cover You, was released on December 4, 2012, through Yellow Sound. Leung is a featured performer on the cast recordings of Godspell, Flower Drum Song, Pacific Overtures, Dear Edwina, and Wall to Wall Sondheim.

== Personal life ==
Leung, who is openly gay, married James Babcock in December 2016.

== Notable roles ==
Theater
Year	Play	Role	Notes
2002–2003	Flower Drum Song	Ensemble	August Wilson Theatre, Broadway; Understudy for Wang Ta
2004–2005	Pacific Overtures	Ensemble	Studio 54, Broadway; Understudy for Kayama
2005	Thoroughly Modern Millie	Bun Foo	Regional
2005	Wicked	Boq / Tin Woodman	Oriental Theatre
2006–2010	Rent	Ensemble	Nederlander Theatre, Broadway and National tour; Understudy for Angel
2010	Rent	Angel Schunard	Hollywood Bowl
2011–2012	Godspell	Ensemble	Circle in the Square Theatre, Broadway
2012, 2015–2016	Allegiance	Young Sam Kimura	Old Globe Theatre and Longacre Theatre, Broadway
2016	The Secret Garden	Fakir Bastiaan	David Geffen Hall
2016–2017	In Transit	Steven	Circle in the Square, Broadway
2017–2019	Aladdin	Aladdin	New Amsterdam Theatre, Broadway
2019; 2021	Jesus Christ Superstar	Peter	Tokyu Theatre Orb
2023	Allegiance	Young Sam Kimura	Charing Cross Theatre, London, United Kingdom
2025–2026	The Phantom of the Opera	The Phantom	218 West 57th Street, New York City, Off-Broadway

Film and television
Year	Title	Role	Notes
2007	Law & Order: Criminal Intent	Kenny Li	Episode: "Renewal"
2008	Rent: Filmed Live on Broadway	Ensemble	Understudy for Angel
2009	Limelight	Kevin Chang	Pilot
2010	Rent at the Hollywood Bowl	Angel Schunard	
2010–2011	Glee	Wes	7 episodes
2011	Late Show with David Letterman	'Godspell' Ensemble	1 episodes
2014	Deadbeat	Hiro Tamagachi	Episode: "The Hot God Contest"
2016	Odd Mom Out	Richard	Episode: "The High Road"
2016	George Takei's Allegiance	Sammy Kimura	Television film
2018	Instinct	Sam	Episode: "Bye Bye Birdie"
2020	The Nice List	Chestnut	Television film
2021	New Amsterdam	Singer No. 2	Episode: "Blood, Sweat & Tears"
2023	Warrior	Marcel	5 episodes
2025	Greys Anatomy	Patient's Friend	Episode: "Jump (for my love)"

Video games
Year	Title	Role	Notes
2005	True Crime: New York City	Fei Lao / Peasant	

== Discography ==
Studio albums

- Songs for You (2015)
- I'll Cover You (2012)

Extended plays

- Getaway (2005)

Singles

- "New York State of Mind" (2015)

Cast albums

- Godspell (2011)
- Sweet Bye and Bye (2011)
- Dear Edwina (2008)
- Wall to Wall Sondheim (2006)
- Pacific Overtures (2005)
