= Maistro =

UK-based company

Maistro UK Ltd
- Type: Private
- Founded: 2007; 19 years ago
- Headquarters: Shrewsbury, UK
- Area served: Worldwide
- Key people: David Rumble (Chair)
- Services: Procurement-as-a-Service and Managed Services
- Website: maistro.com welovetoknow.com

Maistro (formerly Blur Group) is a UK-based company which provides an AI-native online platform for organisations to buy and manage services in General Business Services (GBS), Business Process Outsourcing (BPO), Technology Services (ITES) and Digital Enablement Services (DES). It operates its Managed Services through a subsidiary The Knowledge Group, T/A tkg, which delivers services for clients in the UK, Europe and USA.

== Services ==
The group operates two related platforms.

Maistro is an AI-native sourcing platform that uses AI orchestration to help organisations identify, evaluate and select service providers. It focuses on General Business Services (GBS), Business Process Outsourcing (BPO), IT-Enabled Services (ITES) and Digital Enablement Services (DES). It covers the process from defining requirements through supplier discovery, shortlisting, evaluation and contracting. Maistro is offered on a freemium basis.

The Knowledge Group (tkg), Maistro’s subsidiary, operates a separate platform built on Maistro’s underlying technology. It uses its own large language model for the same categories, complementing this with real-time data and insights from a large pool of category specialists. Clients typically pay a platform fee plus charges based on token usage. The tkg platform also uses a practitioner model, in which sourcing specialists work alongside the platform to provide advisory and outsourcing support.

Users of both platforms have access to the group’s combined supplier network, which the company states includes over 35,000 suppliers across the UK and Europe, Asia-Pacific and North America. Suppliers are vetted to different levels depending on each customer’s requirements.

== History ==
=== Establishment ===
The company was founded as Blur Group PLC in 2007 and was based in Exeter Science Park, Exeter, in the UK. Its early service offerings included a b2b exchange, b-uncut.net, focused initially on the media and creative industries.

Under the leadership of CEO Philip Letts (formerly CEO of Beenz.com), an investment round in Q4 2011 attracted investment from Archie Norman, among others.

In 2012, the company claimed its 1,200th project, and went public on the London Stock Exchange Alternative Investment Market (AIM) in October 2012.

In 2013, Blur raised $11.5m in a secondary round of financing and opened an office in Dallas, Texas, followed by raising a further $22m in May 2014. Also in 2014, it claimed the third iteration of its platform was being adopted faster than anticipated. In 2015, it claimed it had 65,000 service providers.

=== Financial reporting concerns (2014-2017) ===
In 2014, Blur Group's stock price fell due to concerns regarding how revenue was reported. This came to light after a profit warning was released, indicating that multiple projects valued at over $100,000 were delayed until the next quarter, resulting in an 80% plunge in stock prices over previous year. Blur issued four profit warnings between January 2014 and May 2015, and had to replace three CFOs in two years.

An investigation led by the Financial Reporting Council (FRC) was initiated to determine if Blur Group was the principal or agent with regards to the outsourcing services provided. The investigation concluded in September 2015, with the FRC welcoming the actions taken by the Blur Group directors, which included making a prior year restatement to reduce reported revenues and increase loss before taxes, as well as clarify the organisation's revenue recognition accounting policy.

Further financial reporting problems led to the company's shares being suspended in June 2017, and reports that Blur could go into administration.

=== 2017 leadership changes ===
In July 2017, the company replaced its entire board.

CEO Philip Letts left the company on 1 August 2017 (having presided over a share price plunge from a 2014 high of 665p to 3p), Laurence Cook, appointed as chief commercial officer in November 2016, became Blur Group CEO, and new chairman David Rowe slashed costs and raised £1.5 million to try to steady the company. The company moved its UK office to Pynes Hill in Exeter in late 2017.

=== Name change, delisting ===
In January 2018, Blur Group PLC changed its name to Maistro PLC.

In March 2019, the company moved its offices back to Exeter Science Park.

On 28 June 2019, at the request of the company, Maistro PLC Ordinary Shares were cancelled from trading on AIM and the company became a private limited company, Maistro UK Ltd.

=== 2020-present ===
In October 2020, CEO Laurence Cook stepped down and strategic development director Phillip Shuldham-Legh was appointed Maistro CEO.

Former England captain and Rugby World Cup winner, Lawrence Dallaglio was company sales director until November 2022.

In November 2020, the company announced it had achieved ISO27001 accreditation.

In November 2022, the company merged with The Knowledge Group Services Limited, then operating in the UK and Europe adding specialist capabilities in the GBS sector.

In January 2024, Spencer Brooks was appointed Group Managing Director and David Rumble took over the role as Chair.

In April 2024, the Group moved its offices to Shrewsbury Business Park.
