= Schoolies week =

Australian week-long student holiday after final examinations

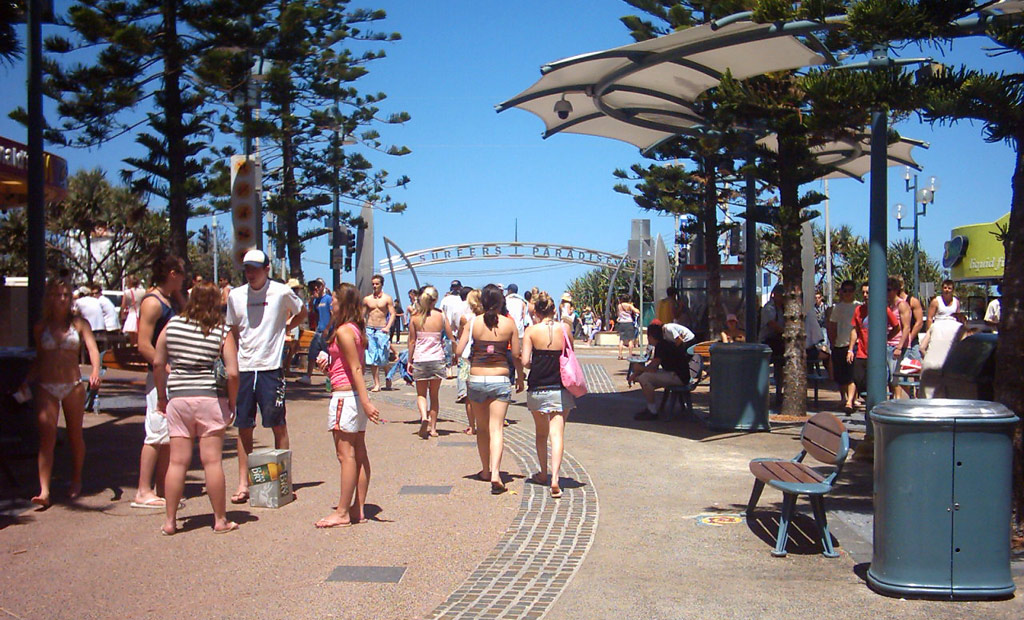
Cavill Mall in Surfers Paradise during Schoolies week.

Schoolies or schoolies week (also known as leavers' or leavers' week in Western Australia and coasties in the Australian Capital Territory) refers to the Australian tradition of high-school graduates (also known as "schoolies" or "leavers") having week-long holidays following the end of their final examinations in late November and early December.

"Toolies" refers to older revellers who participate in Schoolies week but graduated in an earlier year. "Foolies" refers to younger adolescents who participate in Schoolies week but have not yet graduated from high school. Schoolies week is seen as a final party with schoolmates before they head their separate ways.

== History ==
There is a history of school leavers following their final examinations with a holiday on the Gold Coast in Queensland from at least the 1970s. Over time, it acquired the name "Schoolies Week" and events specifically for schoolies week began to be organised. It is claimed the first organised event was in 1976 at Lennon's Broadbeach International Hotel, after manager Geoff Lewis visited Spring Break in Fort Lauderdale and promoted the idea to university students in Queensland. From then on the Gold Coast attracted schoolies from all over Australia for celebrations. Since then, the tradition has spread, and Australian high-school graduates celebrate their graduation with a week-long party at many popular tourist destinations around the country.

Schoolies week is considered by many teenagers in Australia as a cultural rite of passage. Schoolies week is seen as a transitional period from youth to adulthood, marking a change of state from the imposition of school discipline to the chosen freedom to have a body which is out of control.

In 2020, the Queensland Government cancelled all Schoolies events due to the COVID-19 pandemic, while in 2021, the state's border was closed at the time, meaning no Schoolies from other states could attend.

== Locations ==
The Gold Coast, Queensland, particularly Surfers Paradise, maintains its status as the largest single venue for this revelry, attracting tens of thousands of schoolies, mostly from Queensland and northern New South Wales. The Gold Coast is viewed as a liminal space, somewhere to get away, a city of theme parks and leisure by the sea where transitions are possible. Research carried out in 2003 found schoolies boosted the Gold Coast economy by $59 million. In 2011, up to 40,000 students were expected to visit the Gold Coast. Around 16,000 schoolies visited the Gold Coast in 2021.

Schoolies are also present on the Sunshine Coast; this is an alternative for the graduates who fear the negative media attention attracted on the Gold Coast. According to the Sunshine Coast Region council the Sunshine Coast had about 500 schoolies visit in 2009. The local council on the Sunshine Coast stopped providing events for schoolies in 2007.

Schoolies have similar traditions at Magnetic Island off Townsville, Airlie Beach in the Whitsundays and Port Macquarie. Byron Bay and Surfers Paradise are particularly popular amongst private school graduates. For South Australia, Victor Harbor is the location of choice, while in Victoria the Surf Coast is popular, mainly consisting of Lorne and Torquay, however Phillip Island is also quite popular for students living in the east and south of Victoria. At Victor Harbor in 2011, approximately 15,000 students were expected to celebrate. In Western Australia, Rottnest Island off Perth and the South West towns of Dunsborough and Busselton are popular destinations. Also, Western Australians often go to Bali, as it is a spot for parties, late nights, and cheap shopping. In Tasmania there is not an established "Schoolies" location or tradition as such. Internationally, popular schoolies destinations include Bali, Fiji and Vanuatu. In Fiji, whole islands have been dedicated to schoolie celebrations.

=== Official destinations ===
According to Schoolies.com, there were 11 "official" destinations as of 2024. Of the 10 Australian destinations, three are in Queensland (Airlie Beach, the Gold Coast and the Sunshine Coast (Coolum, Mooloolaba and Noosa Heads)), three are in Victoria (Lorne, Phillip Island and Rye), one is in New South Wales (Byron Bay) and one is in Western Australia (Dunsborough). Additionally, the list also includes three international destinations: Fiji, Vanuatu and the island of Bali in Indonesia.

== Official Schoolies events ==
In South Australia, the annual Schoolies Festival at Victor Harbor is run by not-for-profit charity Encounter Youth (EY) and supported by the South Australian Government and South Australian Police. Free bus services to and from the festival are provided from 12 locations across the state, with shuttle buses throughout the event, seeking to minimise drink driving. EY's "Green Team" volunteers commenced in 1998 after locals raised concerns about the thousands of school leavers partying in Victor Harbor. Adelaide Pastor Frank Ahlin brought 40 volunteers to help. Nigel Knowles has been CEO of EY since 2008, and the organisation oversees the festival with input from local council, police and emergency services. It is funded by school leavers and volunteers paying to attend. In 2023, there were 5,000 schoolie attenders and 426 volunteers.

In Queensland, various parties and festivals are run by different private organisations. Safer Schoolies is a Queensland Government initiative launched in 2003 that provides the "Schoolies Hub" on the beach at Surfers Paradise, a free, fenced, alcohol and drug free entertainment precinct only available to registered school leavers.

Leavers WA is a Western Australian state government harm minimisation and crime prevention strategy. WA Police and the Department of Health partner with numerous other agencies and organisations seeking to provide a safe event with bus services, wristbands, and an alcohol and drug free entertainment zone at Dunsborough.

From 1997 until 2003, an 'alternative Schoolies' was held on the Sunshine Coast with a week-long organised alcohol and drug free event. A strategy was developed by the Sunshine Coast Community Drug Awareness Network, who partnered with the Caloundra City, Maroochy and Noosa shire councils, local police, Sunbus, volunteer organisations and local businesses to run the festival, which attracted between 1000 and 2000 school leavers. It came to an end as ticket sales did not cover costs.

Most Schoolies events are supported by an all-volunteer group of Christians who are recruited into the Red Frogs network. Around 1,500 volunteers serve in 17 locations across Australia. The group aims to provide direct support to partying school-leavers through a positive presence. This might involve walking them home, cleaning or cooking for them. The network began at the Gold Coast in 1997.

=== Commercial enterprises ===
In 1992, Sports Break Travel Pty Ltd trademarked the word "Schoolies". In 1995, they brought a Federal Court case against P&O Holidays for using the word in its brochures and magazines. P&O denied they had infringed the trademark, and brought a counter-claim asking for it to be expunged from the trademark register. In 2000, Justice James Burchett ruled in favour of P&O, saying the word was established in colloquial usage by the early 1980s and therefore "should not be the unique preserve of one trader". In 2005, the Australian Competition and Consumer Commission accepted an enforceable undertaking from Break Free Holidays that it would no longer threaten legal proceedings against others who use the word.

The website Schoolies.com, despite sometimes being called the "official Schoolies website," is an accommodation and booking service operated by private company Group Travel Manager. Former AFL footballer, Matt Lloyd has been its CEO since 1996. The company provides photo IDs and security patrols, organises parties and partners with Red Frogs in some locations, providing free accommodation to volunteers. In 2019, the company promoted a partnership with dating app Tinder, a plan that was discontinued after receiving backlash from parents and the media. The company also received criticism in 2020 for giving credit vouchers rather than refunds to students who had to cancel trips due to the pandemic.

In 2008, Jot Lynas, Steve Pirie, and Bryan Scott cofounded Unleashed Travel, a company specialising in overseas destinations aimed at schoolies. The first year, they chartered a resort in Fiji and had 400 school leavers book in. By 2011, the company was named one of Business Review Weekly's 100 fastest growing startups with a turnover of AUD$6 million. They provide security, airport transfers, and ban duty free alcohol. In 2020, the company received criticism for postponing rather than cancelling its trips due to the pandemic, therefore not providing refunds on deposits.

== Toolies and foolies ==
Popular schoolies' (or leavers') venues are often attended by people well past school age, labelled by the media as "toolies" or "droolies". Toolies are associated with the targeting of drunk teenagers for sex, and are also frequently involved in disturbances taking place during the celebrations. Because of this, toolies are a major topic of media scrutiny during Schoolies week. The term also includes early school leavers who are in apprenticeship training but join in the schoolies celebrations.

Another group that have some presence at Schoolies week celebrations are those known as "foolies" or "pre-schoolies". These are adolescents who have not yet left school but still partake in activities during Schoolies week. Many organised events during Schoolies week, such as concerts, only admit those who are school leavers. On the Gold Coast in particular, Schoolies are often given wristbands as a form of identification.

== Criticism ==
Since the event began to attract large enough numbers to warrant annual media attention, Schoolies week has become a familiar concept nationwide. The media have represented the event as a period of lawlessness, loutish behaviour and unruliness. Some local residents and media have criticised the event due to binge drinking and sexual promiscuity. Police attention is regularly required where the collective behaviour of schoolies at some locations gets out of hand, such as at Rottnest Island in 1986. In efforts to reduce such acts, the week-long event on Rottnest Island in Western Australia has, as of 2006, been reduced to three days, which itself has resulted in a fair amount of criticism from young members of the public.

In recent years, violence (notably sexual violence) has become an increased threat to the safety of attendees. Fights have broken out between schoolies from one area and another and predictable media coverage of antics, accidents, and attacks has followed. The Queensland Government has been criticised for their efforts to stage-manage the event and limit celebrations.

2009 saw one of the most troublesome Gold Coast Schoolies celebrations in history, where in one night, police arrested 30 schoolies, and the number of arrests for the entire week doubled compared to the previous year. Superintendent Jim Keogh said that during eight days of 2009 schoolies celebrations, 217 schoolies had been arrested on 244 charges, compared with 94 schoolies arrested for the same period in 2006. Charges were laid against schoolies for serious assault, drunk and disorderly conduct, drug possession and obstructing police. The incidents prompted talks of banning Schoolies week. This has led schoolies to look at safer alternatives to ensure their wellbeing.

== Problems and risks ==
Schoolies week celebrations can involve large volumes of alcohol and other drugs such as tobacco, cannabis and ecstasy. Confrontations between participants can occur resulting in violent assaults. Other problems and risk associated with schoolies week include sexual health and sexual assault. In 2010, the Queensland Police made 145 arrests of school leavers on the Gold Coast, down from the 220 arrests made in 2009.

=== Alcohol and other drugs ===
Widely considered a week long alcohol binge, schoolies week is most criticised for excessive drinking and problems that flow from this. A 2010 study found that almost two-thirds of schoolies will consume more than ten drinks per night. The survey also revealed that most of the teenagers surveyed rated the experience negatively afterwards.

More recently laws have been changed at a Federal level increasing the tax on pre-mixed spirits, and at a state level in Queensland to focus on parents supplying alcohol to their children in an irresponsible way. Drink spiking has also been a significant problem.

The availability of drugs at Schoolies week has also been a problem. In 2011, 25% of male schoolies and 14% of females reported being stoned most or every day or night of Schoolies week.

=== Sex ===
Sexual health has been made a focus since opportunities for casual sex at schoolies week can lead to unprotected sex and the propagation of sexually transmitted infections (STIs). There are also concerns about sexual activity in public places such as beaches. Increases in sexual assaults during schoolies week destinations has also been a problem. A 2010 study found that one-third of males were expecting to have sex with multiple partners.

=== Violence ===
Schoolies has been long known for its violence, and media reporting has often focused on schoolies violence. In 1996, the Gold Coast City Council began to increase regulation of events and spaces.

One of the most violent Schoolies was in 2002 at the Gold Coast. Police were under-resourced, as several violent clashes occurred involving groups of people every night that week. In subsequent years with police numbers significantly increased and innovative approaches developed, the violence has continued, but police have rapidly engaged and resolved violence. When the Queensland Government took over the management of Schoolies at the Gold Coast in 2003 from the Gold Coast City Council, after the most violent Schoolies week in 2002, their primary concern was public perceptions of Schoolies week.

Schoolies destinations have been more heavily policed since, and some destinations have engaged private security guards to assist. The most significant statistic regarding violence at schoolies over the past few decades has placed the blame more so in the hands of 'toolies' than 'schoolies' themselves. Damage to hotel rooms has occurred, as well as vandalism to other private and public property.

=== Injuries and death ===
In 2002, the Queensland Government established a triage to treat and assess injuries and implement first aid. There have been a number of schoolies-related deaths and many violent altercations between youths. In one case death resulting from balcony fall in 2010 which has been claimed to be from planking. Climbing between apartment balconies is problematic. The offence can lead to arrest and is punishable by a fine of up to $2,875 and one year imprisonment.

== Popular culture ==
- Blurred is an Australian play about school leavers travelling to schoolies week.
- Blurred is a 2002 Australian film based on the play.
- Extensive footage of schoolies and schoolies week was featured in Fat Pizza Uncensored, a DVD collection of extras sold with some copies of the DVD for Fat Pizza: The Movie.
- The band TISM recorded a song titled "Schoolies Week," which parodies schoolies week, describing it as having the same properties that would be found in hell.
- Episode 8 of Season 3 of Heartbreak High (2022—2026) was set at Schoolies on The Gold Coast

== See also ==
- Civil disturbances in Western Australia
- Russ, Norwegian graduate revelry
- Senior Week, a week where recently graduated high school seniors in the United States go to the beach
- Spring break, a week-long recess from studying in early spring at universities in the United States, Canada, Japan, Korea, China and other countries.
- Swotvac, week period preceding examinations
