= Once Upon a Dream (Lea Michele cabaret) =

2008 concert tour by Lea Michele

- Tour by Lea Michele
- Start date: February 15, 2008
- End date: August 16, 2008
- Legs: 1
- No. of shows: 6 in North America

Lea Michele concert chronology
- Once Upon a Dream (Lea Michele cabaret) (2008); Glee Live! In Concert! (2010-2011)

Once Upon a Dream is the debut solo concert residency / cabaret act by American singer Lea Michele. The residency was performed at Feinstein's at the Loews Regency in New York City. It was performed at the time while Michele was starring on Broadway in Spring Awakening and prior before being cast as Rachel Berry on Glee. It showcases the stage and future screen star performing of variety of dream Broadway role songs honoring the women that inspired her. The show was initially a one night only concert on February 25, 2008. However, due to an overwhelming sold out success, Michele performed 2 encore engagements.

Michele later updated the show bringing it to Los Angeles' Upright Cabaret at Mark's Restaurant in West Hollywood for 3 sold-out shows in August 2008. That engagement marked as her West Coast debut.

== Setlist ==
The following setlist is obtained from the debut concert on February 25, 2008. It is not a representation of all shows on the residency.

1. "Not For The Life of Me" from Thoroughly Modern Millie
2. "Once Upon a Dream" / "Someone Like You" from Jekyll and Hyde
3. "Easy To Be Hard" from Hair
4. "Waiting For Life" from Once On This Island
5. "I Don't Know How To Love Him" from Jesus Christ Superstar
6. "Touch Me" from Spring Awakening
7. "Another Day"
8. "Say It Somehow" from The Light in the Piazza
9. "Somewhere" from West Side Story
10. "Now While I'm Around" from Sweeney Todd - Duet with Landon Beard
11. "The Wizard and I" from Wicked
12. "Not A Day Goes By" from Merrily We Roll Along
13. "Life Of The Party" from The Wild Party
14. "On My Own" from Les Misérables

Notes

- "You'll Never Get Away From Me" from Gypsy was performed with Jonathan Groff at the April 7th, 2008 show
- "A Little Fall Of Rain" from Les Misérables was performed with John Lloyd Young during the Los Angeles shows.
- John Lloyd Young performed a mini set of "Can't Take My Eyes Off Of You" and "Multitudes of Amys" while Michele did a wardrobe change during the Los Angeles shows

== Dates ==
Date	City	Country	Venue	Special Guest
North America
February 25, 2008	New York City	United States	Feinstein's at the Loews Regency	Landon Beard
April 7, 2008	New York City	United States	Feinstein's at the Loews Regency	Landon Beard, Jonathan Groff
June 16, 2008	New York City	United States	Feinstein's at the Loews Regency	Michael Arden
August 15, 2008	Los Angeles	United States	Upright Cabaret at Mark's Restaurant	John Lloyd Young
August 16, 2008	Los Angeles	United States	Upright Cabaret at Mark's Restaurant	John Lloyd Young
