= Kevin Tancharoen =

American director, producer & screenwriter (born 1984)

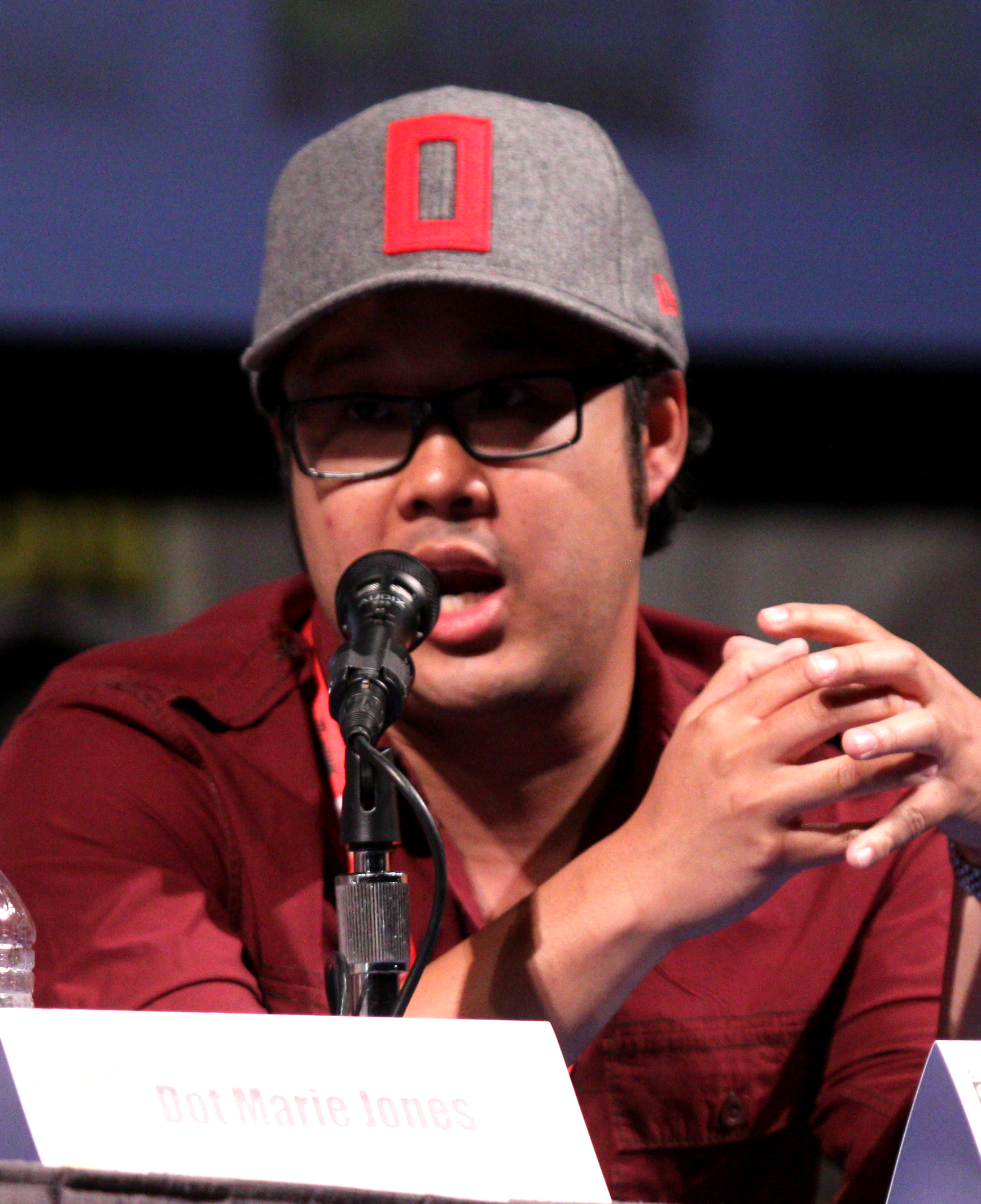
- Tancharoen at San Diego Comic-Con in July 2011
- Born: Kevin Harwick Tancharoen; April 23, 1984 (age 42); Los Angeles, California, U.S.
- Occupations: Director, producer, screenwriter, dancer, choreographer
- Years active: 2003–present
- Spouse: Ashley Edner (m. 2022)
- Relatives: Maurissa Tancharoen (sister); Bobby Edner (brother-in-law); Jed Whedon (brother-in-law)

Kevin Tancharoen (born April 23, 1984) is an American director, producer, screenwriter, dancer, and choreographer. On September 29, 2011, New Line Cinema/Warner Bros. announced that Tancharoen would direct a film adaptation of Mortal Kombat after he created the successful web series Mortal Kombat: Legacy, although he dropped out of the project in 2013.

== Life and career ==
Tancharoen was born in Los Angeles, California. He is the brother of writer and producer Maurissa Tancharoen (and brother-in-law of Jed Whedon) and the son of Tommy Tancharoen.

He is known for being a choreographer for Madonna, directing Britney Spears' "The Onyx Hotel Tour" and co-creating DanceLife on MTV.

He made his feature film directorial debut in 2009 with the remake of the 1980 film Fame. In 2010, Tancharoen directed the short film Mortal Kombat: Rebirth as a proof of concept for his vision of a new Mortal Kombat feature. From that, he directed and produced the Mortal Kombat: Legacy web series.

In 2011, Tancharoen directed Glee: The 3D Concert Movie, a 3D concert film of the Glee Live! In Concert! tour based on the musical TV series. On September 29, 2011, New Line Cinema/Warner Bros. announced that Kevin Tancharoen had signed on to direct a new big-screen adaptation of Mortal Kombat, but he backed out of the project in October 2013. In an interview, Tancharoen told Nerd Reactor that he is still planning to direct season 3 of Mortal Kombat: Legacy.

== Filmography ==
=== Film ===
- Fame (2009)
- Mortal Kombat: Rebirth (2010; also screenwriter, producer and editor)
- Glee: The 3D Concert Movie (2011)
- Arcana (2011)

=== Television ===
- Britney Spears Live from Miami (2004)
- The JammX Kids (2004)
- Twentyfourseven (2006)
- Dancelife (2006; 8 episodes, also co-executive producer)
- Pussycat Dolls Present: The Search for the Next Doll (2007)
- Mortal Kombat: Legacy (2011–2013; co-developer)
- Sequestered (2014; 8 episodes, also co-producer)
- Agents of S.H.I.E.L.D. (2014–2020; 16 episodes)
- The Flash (2015–2018; 3 episodes)
- Supergirl (2015; 1 episode)
- 12 Monkeys (2016; 1 episode)
- Arrow (2016–2018; 3 episodes)
- Legends of Tomorrow (2016–2017; 2 episodes)
- Midnight, Texas (2017; 1 episode)
- Prison Break (2017; 2 episodes)
- Iron Fist (2017; 1 episode)
- Star (2017–2018; 2 episodes)
- Inhumans (2017; 1 episode)
- Deception (2018; 1 episode)
- Warrior (2019; 1 episode)
- Titans (2019; 1 episode)
- A Million Little Things (2019; 1 episode)
- Tell Me a Story (2020; 1 episode)
- Helstrom (2020; 1 episode)
- The Book of Boba Fett (2022; 1 episode)
- The Brothers Sun (2024; 5 episodes, also executive producer)
- Teacup (2024; executive producer)
- S.W.A.T. Exiles (2026; 1 episode)

=== Other ===
- You Got Served (2004, actor) as Dancer
- Strange Fruit (2008; editor and composer)
- Mortal Kombat: Rebirth (2010; producer)
- Mobbed (2011; consulting producer)

== Personal life ==
Tancharoen started dating actress Ashley Edner in May 2019. They became engaged in September 2020 after 14 months of dating. They married on February 12, 2022.
