= Lea Michele on screen and stage =

Lea Michele filmography
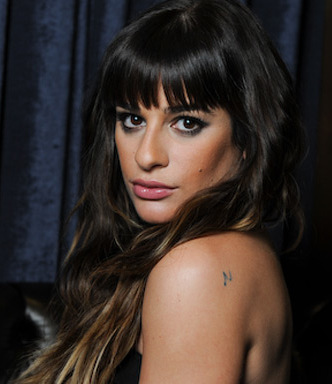
- Film: 5
- Television: 10
- Stage: 12
- Music videos: 3

The following is the list of film, television and theatre credits for American actress, singer, and author Lea Michele. Michele came to worldwide prominence after being cast in the main role of Rachel Berry in the Fox musical comedy-drama series Glee (2009–15). On Broadway, Michele originated the role of Wendla Bergmann in the rock musical Spring Awakening (2006–08) and as a child appeared in Les Misérables as Young Cosette. She also originated the role of Little Girl in Ragtime and played Shprintze and Chava in the Broadway revival of the musical Fiddler on the Roof.

Michele made her film debut in the ensemble romantic comedy New Year's Eve (2011). Michele then voiced the main character Dorothy Gale in the animated film Legends of Oz: Dorothy's Return (2014). She then starred as Hester Ulrich in Fox's horror-comedy series Scream Queens (2015–16). Michele portrayed Valentina Barrella in the ABC sitcom The Mayor (2017–18). In July 2019, Michele was cast as Olivia Henderson in the ABC's tv movie Same Time, Next Christmas.

== Film ==
Year	Title	Role	Notes	Ref
1998	Buster & Chauncey's Silent Night	Christina (voice)		
2011	Glee: The 3D Concert Movie	Rachel Berry		
2011	New Year's Eve	Elise		
2014	Legends of Oz: Dorothy's Return	Dorothy Gale (voice)		
2022	Spring Awakening: Those You've Known	Herself	Documentary	

== Television ==
Year	Title	Role	Notes	Ref
2000	Third Watch	Sammi	Episode: "Spring Forward Fall Back"	
2009–15	Glee	Rachel Berry	118 episodes	
2010	The Simpsons	Sarah (voice)	Episode: "Elementary School Musical"	
2011	The Cleveland Show	Rachel Berry (voice)	Episode: "How Do You Solve a Problem Like Roberta?"	
2014	Sons of Anarchy	Gertie	Episode: "Smoke 'em If You Got 'em"	
2015–16	Scream Queens	Hester Ulrich	23 episodes	
2017	Dimension 404	Amanda	Episode: "Matchmaker"	
2017–18	The Mayor	Valentina Barella	13 episodes	
2019	Same Time, Next Christmas	Olivia Henderson	Television film	
2026	Elsbeth	Darcy Miles	Episode: "Lean Girls"	
TBA	Untitled Glee Reboot †	Rachel Berry	Upcoming series	

== Stage ==
Year	Title	Role	Venue	Ref
1995–96	Les Misérables	Young Cosette u/s Gavroche	Imperial Theatre	
1997	Ragtime	Little Girl	Toronto Centre for the Arts	
1998–99	Ragtime	Little Girl	Lyric Theatre	
2004	The Diary of Anne Frank	Anne Frank	Round House Theatre	
2004–05	Fiddler on the Roof	Shprintze	Minskoff Theatre	
2006	Hot and Sweet	Naleen	New York Musical Theatre Festival	
2006	Spring Awakening	Wendla Bergmann	Atlantic Theater Company	
2006–08	Spring Awakening	Wendla Bergmann	Eugene O'Neill Theatre	
2008	Alive in the World	Phoebe	The Zipper Factory	
2008	Les Misérables	Éponine Thénardier	Hollywood Bowl	
2010	The Rocky Horror Show	Janet Weiss	Wiltern Theatre	
2019	The Little Mermaid	Princess Ariel	Hollywood Bowl	
2021	Spring Awakening 15th Reunion Concert	Wendla Bergmann	Imperial Theatre	
2022–23	Funny Girl	Fanny Brice	August Wilson Theatre	
2023	Ragtime	Ensemble	Minskoff Theatre	
2025-26	Chess	Florence Vassy	Imperial Theatre	

== Music videos ==
Year	Song	Artist	Ref
2013	"Cannonball"	Herself	
2014	"On My Way"	Herself	
2019	"Christmas in New York"	Herself	
