= The Revenge of the Radioactive Lady =

2011 novel by Elizabeth Stuckey-French

- First edition
- Author: Elizabeth Stuckey-French
- Language: English
- Genre: Fiction
- Publisher: Doubleday
- Publication place: United States

The Revenge of the Radioactive Lady is a 2011 novel by Elizabeth Stuckey-French. The story follows a woman who decides to exact revenge on the man who secretly poisoned her over forty years ago.

== Background ==
The story is loosely-based on prenatal experiments conducted at Vanderbilt University, in which 700 pregnant women were given radioactive iron in order to see if radioactivity could pass through the placenta and affect the unborn children. (The experiments found that it could.) The women were given prenatal vitamin drinks and were unaware that the beverages contained radio active material.

Author Elizabeth Stuckey-French said that she found out about the government-engineered radiation experiments upon discovering the book The Plutonium Files: America’s Secret Medical Experiments in the Cold War by Eileen Welsome at her local library.

== Plot summary ==
Marylou Ahearn temporarily moves from Memphis, Tennessee to Tallahassee, Florida to take an extended vacation. In actuality though, she is really there in order to find and murder retired doctor Wilson Spriggs. It is explained that in the 1950s, Dr. Spriggs was in charge of a medical experiment where pregnant woman were unknowingly given a vitamin cocktail with radioactive iron as part of a secret government study. Marylou was one of the patients who was given the cocktail in 1953. Though she did not know this until years later, the effects of the iron caused her to develop several health problems. Including for her daughter, Helen, to die from cancer at only eight years old.

Once she gets to Tallahassee, Marylou goes by the pseudonym Nancy Archer from the film Attack of the 50 Foot Woman, and moves into a house on the edge of Dr. Spriggs' neighborhood. But she soon discovers that Wilson is now suffering from dementia, and has been relocated there to live with his daughter, Caroline. Deciding she needs a new approach, Marylou befriends Caroline's daughter and Wilson's youngest grandchild, Suzi, and soon gets to know the rest of the family. She then decides that instead of killing a man who no longer members his crimes, she should ruin his entire family.

It turns out that Marylou will not have to make much effort. Caroline is going through a mid-life crisis, and is estranged by her husband, Vic. Their oldest daughter Ava has Asperger syndrome; along with a severe obsession with Elvis. Otis, their son, spends most of his time working in the family shed, and Suzi, the seemingly normal child, feels neglected in her own home.

Marylou first takes Ava to a professional photographer since she wants to be on America's Next Top Model, and convinces her to take nude photographs for her application. She then tricks Suzi into going to a fundamentalist church run by her neighbor, Buff Coffey, as a way to encourage her to become a devout Christian. After seeing some of the experiments Otis is conducting in the shed, Marylou decides to report him to the United States Environmental Protection Agency.

Over time, Marylou begins to grow close to the Spriggs family, and regrets the ramifications of her actions. Suzi ends up getting molested by Buff, who also tried to make advances against her sister. Ava's naked pictures are uploaded online by the photographer. And Vic's work project is put in jeopardy when he and Marylou catch his employee Gigi tampering with their research findings. Caroline eventually discovers the truth about Marylou's real identity through old files about her father's research, and confronts her. Marylou explains that while she did intend to destroy their lives, she abandoned that idea because she realized that they were innocent people.

Sometime after this, Buff regains support from the church for what happened with Suzi. Causing an outraged Marylou to give him a pineapple upside down cake mixed with poison. She then takes Wilson back to the clinic where they first met in hopes of jogging his memory. During the trip, she and Wilson form a connection over the past. When Caroline tracks them down, Marylou and her father tells them that they have decided to get married.

== Characters ==
Marylou Ahearn- Marylou is the main protagonist of the story. She is approximately seventy-four years old at the beginning of the novel. Marylou was pregnant about three times in her life (the first two being miscarriages) from her ex-husband Teddy. Right before Helen's death, Marylou realizes that the medicine given to her by Wilson Spriggs could have caused her illness when she sees him at the same hospital where Helen is staying. Her theory is later proven true when she and dozens of other women are given settlements from the government. The money Marylou receives allows her to retire from her job as a teacher.

Dr. Wilson Spriggs- Dr. Spriggs is the physician who gave Marylou the radioactive drug cocktail in 1953. Which was actually a part of a secret government study that used over hundreds of unknowing women as their test subjects. Wilson had his daughter Caroline with his first wife Martha, and was married to a woman named Verna Tommy up until her death three years ago. He moves in with his daughter's family after he starts experiencing memory problems.

== Reviews ==
The book received positive reviews from the New York Times.
