= Brunette Ambition =

2014 book by Lea Michele

- Author: Lea Michele
- Language: English
- Genre: Autobiography
- Publisher: Crown Archetype
- Publication date: May 20, 2014
- Publication place: United States
- Media type: Hardcover
- Pages: 208
- ISBN: 9780804139076

Brunette Ambition is an autobiographical book by American actress and singer Lea Michele, released on May 20, 2014, by Random House imprint Crown Archetype. It placed at number three on The New York Times Best Seller list shortly after its release. The book also debuted on the U.S. Nonfiction Best Seller list at number nine.

Brunette Ambition covers topics such as family and friendships, working in show business, fashion, food, and personal health.

== Background ==
On May 23, 2013, it was reported that Michele had landed a book deal with Random House and Harmony Books to write an autobiography, chronicling her rise from Broadway actress to the star of the Fox comedy-drama series Glee. In the announcement, Michele said, "There was not a guidebook when I was growing up, that detailed everything I would need to do, and know, to get where I am today. But I believe I can write one of the sorts: not a how-to-make-it-in-show-business book, but a guide to harnessing tenacity, passion, enthusiasm and hard work to make your dreams come true."

== Related books ==
In June 2014, shortly after the release of Brunette Ambition, it was reported that Michele would write a follow-up. The second book, titled You First: Journal Your Way to Your Best Life was published on September 22, 2015, by Crown Archetype.
