= List of awards and nominations received by Lea Michele =

Lea Michele awards and nominations
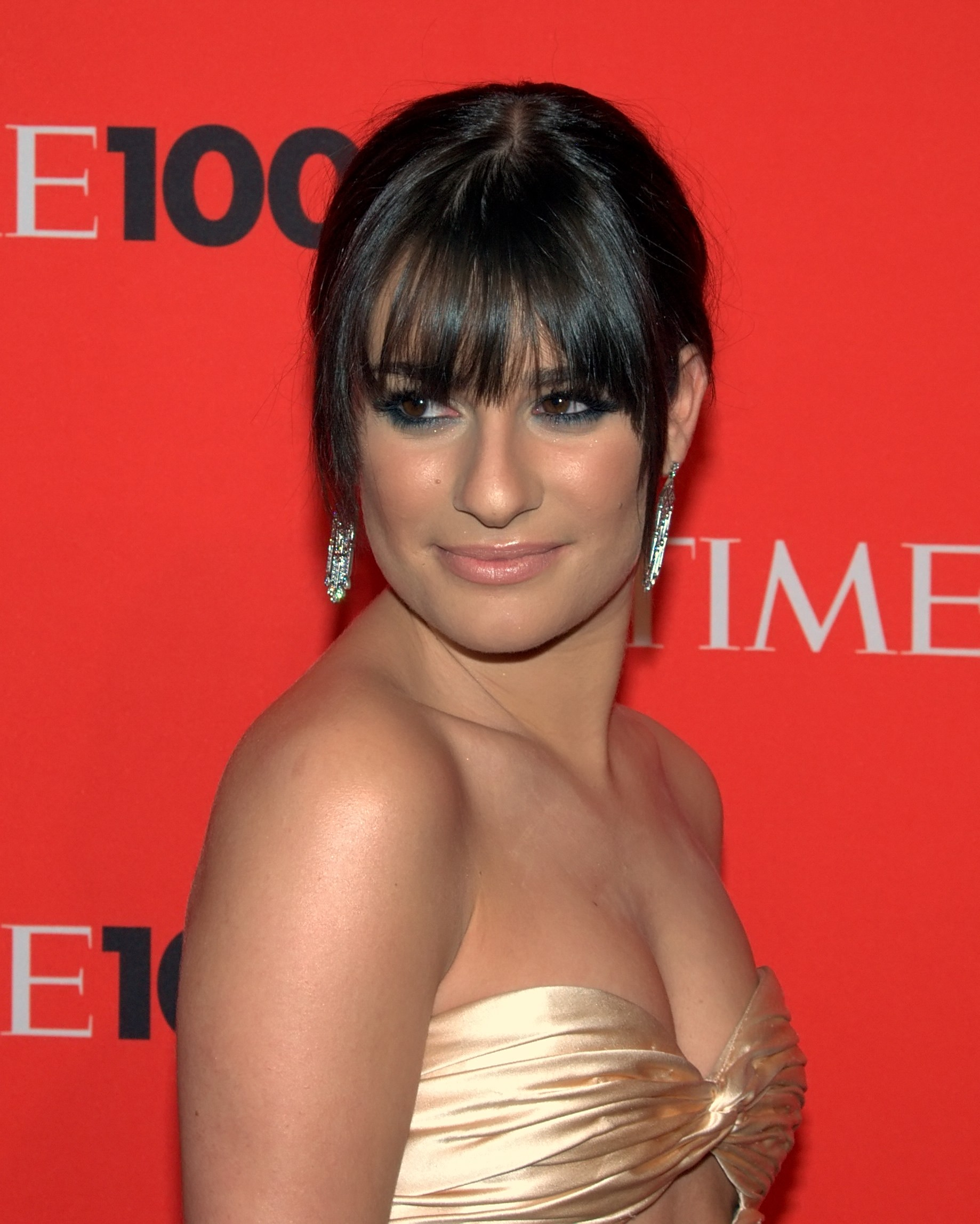
- Michele at the Time 100 gala in 2010
Awards and nominations
Award	Wins	Nominations
Billboard Women in Music	1	1
Broadway.com Audience Awards	7	10
Drama Desk Awards	0	1
Golden Globe Awards	0	2
Grammy Awards	0	1
People's Choice Award	3	5
Primetime Emmy Awards	0	1
Screen Actors Guild Awards	1	4
Satellite Awards	1	4
Teen Choice Award	4	12

The following is a list of awards and nominations received by American actress and singer-songwriter Lea Michele. Michele's portrayal of Rachel Berry in the comedy-drama series Glee has received much critical praise, earning her two Golden Globe nominations for Best Actress in a Television Series – Comedy or Musical and a Primetime Emmy nomination for Outstanding Lead Actress in a Comedy Series. She has also received a Satellite Award, a Screen Actors Guild Award and three consecutive People's Choice Awards for her performance in the role. Prior to starring in Glee, Michele was the female star of Spring Awakening on Broadway, for which she was nominated for the Drama Desk Award for Outstanding Actress in a Musical.

== Theatre awards ==
=== Broadway.com Audience Awards ===
Year	Award	Category	Work	Result	Ref.
2007	Broadway.com Audience Awards	Favorite Leading Actress in a Broadway Musical	Spring Awakening	Nominated	
2007	Broadway.com Audience Awards	Favorite Female Breakthrough Performance	Spring Awakening	Won	
2007	Broadway.com Audience Awards	Favorite Onstage Pair	Spring Awakening	Won (Note: Shared with Jonathan Groff)	
2007	Broadway.com Audience Awards	Favorite Ensemble Cast	Spring Awakening	Won (Note: Shared with the cast of that respective media.)	
2023	Broadway.com Audience Awards	Favorite Replacement	Funny Girl	Won	
2026	Broadway.com Audience Awards	Favorite Leading Actress in a Musical	Chess	Won	
2026	Broadway.com Audience Awards	Favorite Diva Performance	Chess	Won	
2026	Broadway.com Audience Awards	Favorite Onstage Pair	Chess	Nominated (Note: Shared with Nicholas Christopher)	
2026	Broadway.com Audience Awards	Favorite Onstage Pair	Chess	Nominated (Note: Shared with Aaron Tveit)	
2026	Broadway.com Audience Awards	Performance of the Year (Musical)	Chess	Won	

=== Drama Desk Awards ===
The Drama Desk Awards are an annual event celebrating excellence in New York City theatre productions.

Year	Award	Category	Work	Result	Ref.
2007	Drama Desk Awards	Outstanding Actress in a Musical	Spring Awakening	Nominated	

=== Drama League Awards ===
Year	Award	Category	Work	Result	Ref.
2026	Drama League Award	Distinguished Performance	Chess	Nominated	

== Film and television awards ==
=== Behind the Voice Actors Awards ===
Year	Award	Category	Work	Result	Ref.
2015	Behind the Voice Actors Awards	Best Female Lead Vocal Performance in a Feature Film	Legends of Oz: Dorothy's Return	Nominated	

=== Dorian Awards ===
Year	Award	Category	Work	Result	Ref.
2014	Dorian Awards	TV Musical Performance of 2013	"Make You Feel My Love" on Glee	Nominated	

=== DoSomething Awards ===
Year	Award	Category	Work	Result	Ref.
2012	Do Something Awards	Best Actress	Glee	Won	

=== Primetime Emmy Awards ===
The Primetime Emmy Awards are an annual ceremony celebrating excellence in the television industry.

Year	Award	Category	Work	Result	Ref.
2010	Primetime Emmy Awards	Outstanding Lead Actress in a Comedy Series	Glee	Nominated	

=== E! Best. Ever. TV Awards ===
Year	Award	Category	Work	Result	Ref.
2014	E! Best. Ever. TV Awards	Best Actress in a Comedy	Glee	Won	

=== Gay People's Choice Awards ===
Year	Award	Category	Work	Result	Ref.
2010	Gay People's Choice Awards	Favorite Breakout Actress	Glee	Won	

=== Glamour Women of the Year Awards ===
Year	Award	Category	Work	Result	Ref.
2010	UK Glamour Women of the Year Awards	US TV Actress of the Year	Glee	Won	
2012	UK Glamour Women of the Year Awards	US TV Actress of the Year	Glee	Won	

=== Golden Globe Awards ===
The Golden Globe Awards are annual events celebrating both the film and television industry.

Year	Award	Category	Work	Result	Ref.
2010	Golden Globe Awards	Best Actress – Television Series Musical or Comedy	Glee	Nominated	
2011	Golden Globe Awards	Best Actress – Television Series Musical or Comedy	Glee	Nominated	

=== Golden Nymph Awards ===
Year	Award	Category	Work	Result	Ref.
2011	Golden Nymph Awards	Outstanding Actress – Comedy Series	Glee	Nominated	

=== Golden Remote Awards ===
Year	Award	Category	Work	Result	Ref.
2013	Golden Remote Awards	Favorite Funny Girl	Glee	Won	

=== New York Television Festival Awards ===
Year	Award	Category	Work	Result	Ref.
2009	New York Television Festival Awards	Best Nonscripted Host or Star	Around the Block	Won	

=== NewNowNext Awards ===
Year	Award	Category	Work	Result	Ref.
2010	NewNowNext Awards	Brink of Fame: Actor	Glee	Won	

=== Nickelodeon Australian Kids' Choice Awards ===
Year	Award	Category	Work	Result	Ref.
2010	Nickelodeon Australian Kids' Choice Awards	Fave TV Star	Glee	Nominated	

=== People's Choice Awards ===
The People's Choice Awards is an annual awards show recognizing the people and the work of popular culture. The winners are voted for by the general public.

Year	Award	Category	Work	Result	Ref.
2012	People's Choice Awards	Favorite Actress in a Comedy – TV	Glee	Won	
2013	People's Choice Awards	Favorite Actress in a Comedy – TV	Glee	Won	
2014	People's Choice Awards	Favorite Actress in a Comedy – TV	Glee	Won	
2014	People's Choice Awards	Favorite TV Gal Pals (with Naya Rivera)	Glee	Won	
2016	People's Choice Awards	Favorite Actress in a New TV Series	Scream Queens	Nominated	

=== Satellite Awards ===
The Satellite Awards are annual awards given out by the International Press Academy for excellence in television and film.

Year	Award	Category	Work	Result	Ref.
2009	Satellite Awards	Best Performance by an Actress in a Musical or Comedy Television Series	Glee	Won	
2010	Satellite Awards	Best Performance by an Actress in a Musical or Comedy Television Series	Glee	Nominated	

=== Screen Actors Guild Awards ===
The Screen Actors Guild Award is an accolade given out by SAG-AFTRA, in recognition of excellence in film and primetime television.

Year	Award	Category	Work	Result	Ref.
2010	Screen Actors Guild Awards	Outstanding Performance by an Ensemble in a Comedy Series	Glee	Won	
2011	Screen Actors Guild Awards	Outstanding Performance by an Ensemble in a Comedy Series	Glee	Nominated	
2012	Screen Actors Guild Awards	Outstanding Performance by an Ensemble in a Comedy Series	Glee	Nominated	
2013	Screen Actors Guild Awards	Outstanding Performance by an Ensemble in a Comedy Series	Glee	Nominated	

=== Teen Choice Awards ===
The Teen Choice Awards is an annual event held to honor the biggest achievements in music, movies, sports, television, and fashion. The awards are voted for by teens aged 13 to 19.

Year	Award	Category	Work	Result	Ref.
2009	Teen Choice Awards	Choice TV Breakout Star	Glee	Nominated	
2010	Teen Choice Awards	Choice TV Actress: Comedy	Glee	Nominated	
2010	Teen Choice Awards	Choice Music Group	Glee	Nominated	
2011	Teen Choice Awards	Choice Music Group	Glee	Nominated	
2012	Teen Choice Awards	Choice TV Actress: Comedy	Glee	Won	
2012	Teen Choice Awards	Choice Movie Scene Stealer	New Year's Eve	Nominated	
2013	Teen Choice Awards	Choice TV Actress: Comedy	Glee	Won	
2013	Teen Choice Awards	Choice Style Icon	Herself	Nominated	
2014	Teen Choice Awards	Choice TV Actress: Comedy	Glee	Won	
2015	Teen Choice Awards	Choice TV Actress: Comedy	Glee	Won	
2016	Teen Choice Awards	Choice TV Actress: Comedy	Scream Queens	Nominated	
2016	Teen Choice Awards	Choice TV Villain	Scream Queens	Nominated	

=== TV Guide Awards ===
Year	Award	Category	Work	Result	Ref.
2012	TV Guide Awards	Favorite TV Couple	Glee	Nominated (Note: Shared with Cory Monteith)	

=== TV Land Awards ===
Year	Award	Category	Work	Result	Ref.
2010	TV Land Awards	Future Classic	Glee	Won	

== Music awards ==
=== All About Music Awards ===
Year	Award	Category	Work	Result	Ref.
2011	All About Music Award	Song of the Year	"Get It Right"	Nominated	

=== Billboard's Women in Music Awards ===
Year	Award	Category	Work	Result	Ref.
2010	Billboard's Women in Music	Triple Threat Award	Herself	Won	

=== Grammy Awards ===
The Grammy Award is an accolade by the National Academy of Recording Arts and Sciences of the United States to recognize outstanding achievement in the music industry.

Year	Award	Work	Result	Ref.
2011	Best Pop Performance by a Duo or Group with Vocals	"Don't Stop Believin"	Nominated	

=== Hollywood Music in Media Awards ===
Year	Award	Category	Work	Result	Ref.
2015	Hollywood Music in Media Award	Song – TV Show / Digital Series	"This Time" (from Glee)	Won	

=== World Music Awards ===
The World Music Awards is an international awards show celebrating the world's best-selling artists from each major territory. Nine awards are voted online by the public.

Year	Award	Category	Work	Result	Ref.
2014	World Music Award	World's Best Album	Louder	Nominated	
2014	World Music Award	World's Best Live Act	Herself	Nominated	
2014	World Music Award	World's Best Female Artist	Herself	Nominated	
2014	World Music Award	World's Best Entertainer of the Year	Herself	Nominated	

=== Young Hollywood Awards ===
The Young Hollywood Awards is an award presented annually which honors the year's biggest achievements in pop music, movies, sports, television, fashion and more, as voted on by teenagers aged 13–19 and young adults.

Year	Award	Category	Work	Result	Ref.
2014	Young Hollywood Award	Coolest Crossover Artist	Herself	Nominated	

== Honors ==
=== DoSomething.org ===
Year	Award	Category	Work	Result	Ref.
2011	List of Top 20 Celebs Gone Good of 2011	Advocate for Animal Rights	Herself	Won	

=== Giffoni Film Festival ===
Year	Award	Category	Work	Result	Ref.
2014	Giffoni Film Festival	Giffoni Award	Herself	Won	

=== US Glamour Women of the Year Awards ===
Year	Award	Category	Work	Result	Ref.
2011	US Glamour Women of the Year Awards	The Diva Next Door	Herself	Won	

=== PETA Anniversary Gala ===
Year	Award	Category	Work	Result	Ref.
2010	PETA's 30th Anniversary Gala	Humanitarian Award	Herself	Won	

=== Step Up's Inspiration Awards ===
Year	Award	Category	Work	Result	Ref.
2016	Step Up's Inspiration Awards	Inspiration Honoree	Herself	Won	

=== Time 100 Most Influential People ===
The Time 100 is an annual list of the 100 most influential people in the world, assembled by the American news magazine Time.

Year	Award	Category	Work	Result	Ref.
2010	Time 100	100 Most Influential People	Herself	Won	
2023	Time 100	100 Most Influential People	Herself	Won	

=== Variety Power of Women Awards ===
The Variety Power of Women Awards is an annual event that celebrates Hollywood's most philanthropic and inspiring women.

Year	Award	Category	Work	Result	Ref.
2011	Variety Power of Women Awards	Lifetime Impact Honoree	Herself	Won	

=== Victoria's Secret Sexiest ===
Year	Award	Category	Work	Result	Ref.
2010	Victoria's Secret Sexiest 2010	Sexiest Smile	Herself	Won	
