= Elizabeth Stuckey-French =

American short story writer and novelist

- Born: Little Rock, Arkansas
- Occupations: Short story writer, novelist, fiction Writer
- Spouse: Ned Stuckey-French
- Writing career
- Genre: Creative fiction
- Notable works: "Electric Wizard," "Mudlavia," The First Paper Girl in Red Oak, Iowa, "Revenge of the Radioactive Lady"
- Website: elizabethstuckeyfrench.com

Elizabeth Stuckey-French is an American short story writer, novelist, and professor.

== Early life and education ==
Stuckey-French was born in Little Rock. She grew up in the town of Lafayette, Indiana.

She graduated from Purdue University and was founding editor of the Sycamore Review. She was a James A. Michener Fellow at the Iowa Writers Workshop; she graduated with an MFA in 1992.

== Career ==
Stucky-French's stories have appeared in The Atlantic Monthly, The Gettysburg Review, The Southern Review, Five Points, Narrative. She teaches creative writing at Florida State University.

== Reception ==
Richard Russo, in his commentary about the selections in the 2005 O. Henry anthology, called Stuckey-French's "Mudlavia", "the one that burrowed deepest under my skin". He praised the "simplicity of its storytelling; the way its private and public stories play off each other; its fond, gentle humor; the heartbreaking, hard-won wisdom of its narrator."

== Personal life ==
Stuckey-French lived in Tallahassee, Florida with her husband Ned Stuckey-French and her two daughters. Ned died of cancer in June 2019.

== Awards ==
- 2005 O. Henry Award for the story "Mudlavia", cited by juror Richard Russo
- 2004–2005 Howard Foundation grant
- Indiana Arts Foundation grant
- Florida Arts Foundation grant

== Works ==
=== Short stories ===
- "Junior," The Atlantic, April 1996
- "Electric Wizard," The Atlantic, June 1998
- "Mudlavia," The Atlantic, September 2003
- The First Paper Girl in Red Oak, Iowa. Doubleday. 2000. ISBN 978-0-385-49893-7.
- Tenderloin and other stories. 1992.

=== Novels ===
- Mermaids on the Moon. Doubleday. 2002. ISBN 978-0-7862-4857-5.
- Mudlavia, Doubleday
- The Revenge of the Radioactive Lady, Doubleday, 2011
- Where Wicked Starts, 2014, with Patricia Henley

=== Anthologies ===
- Michael Wilkerson; Deborah Galyan, eds. (1990). "Blessing". New territory: contemporary Indiana fiction. Indiana University Press. p. 95. ISBN 978-0-253-20595-7. "Elizabeth Stuckey-French."

=== Non-fiction ===
- Janet Burroway; Elizabeth Stuckey-French (2007). Writing fiction: a guide to narrative craft. Pearson Longman. ISBN 978-0-321-38414-0.
