= Patricia Henley =

American author

Patricia Henley is an American author. Her debut novel Hummingbird House (published in 1999 by MacMurray & Beck) was a finalist for the 1999 National Book Award for Fiction. She has also published collections of short stories, poetry and non-fiction. Henley taught creative writing at Purdue University.

Hummingbird House tells the story of Kate Banner, an American midwife caring for patients in 1980s Nicaragua during the Nicaraguan Revolution. She is caring for a woman who gave birth the night before but that woman dies. Her boyfriend Deaver, who belittles her with terms like "lightweight" and "spoiled North American woman" breaks up with her. Demoralized after the death of her patient and 8 years of grueling service, she decides to leave her post and return to the United States. Before heading to the United States, Banner stops in Guatemala to visit some friends. She soon learns of another injustice; the Guatemalan government is cracking down on locals from indigenous Mayan descent. Banner unites with the local indigenous peoples as they fight for their rights. Writing for The New York Times, Jeannie Pyun stated that the message of the novel is that "personal connection is the wellspring of political involvement, and Henley frequently expresses this in expert language." Pyun also stated that the novel's shifts from third-person narration in the present day to first-person flashbacks may make it difficult to follow the plot.

In 2014, Henley co-authored the young adult novel Where Wicked Starts with Elizabeth Stuckey-French.

Henley has cited Alice Munro as an early influence in her career. In 2014, Henley's essay The Potholder Model of Literary Ambition, was published in the anthology A Story Larger Than My Own, in which female authors discuss their craft and look back on their careers.

Henley wrote the play If I Hold My Tongue about four former sex workers living in a halfway house struggling to re-integrate into society. The play was originally developed at the Compass Rose Theater in Annapolis, Maryland and premiered in September 2015 at the Kennedy Center as part of the Women's Voices Theater Festival. The festival showcased 51 plays written by women from local theater companies in the Washington, D.C. area.
