= Lea Michele =

American actress and singer (born 1986)

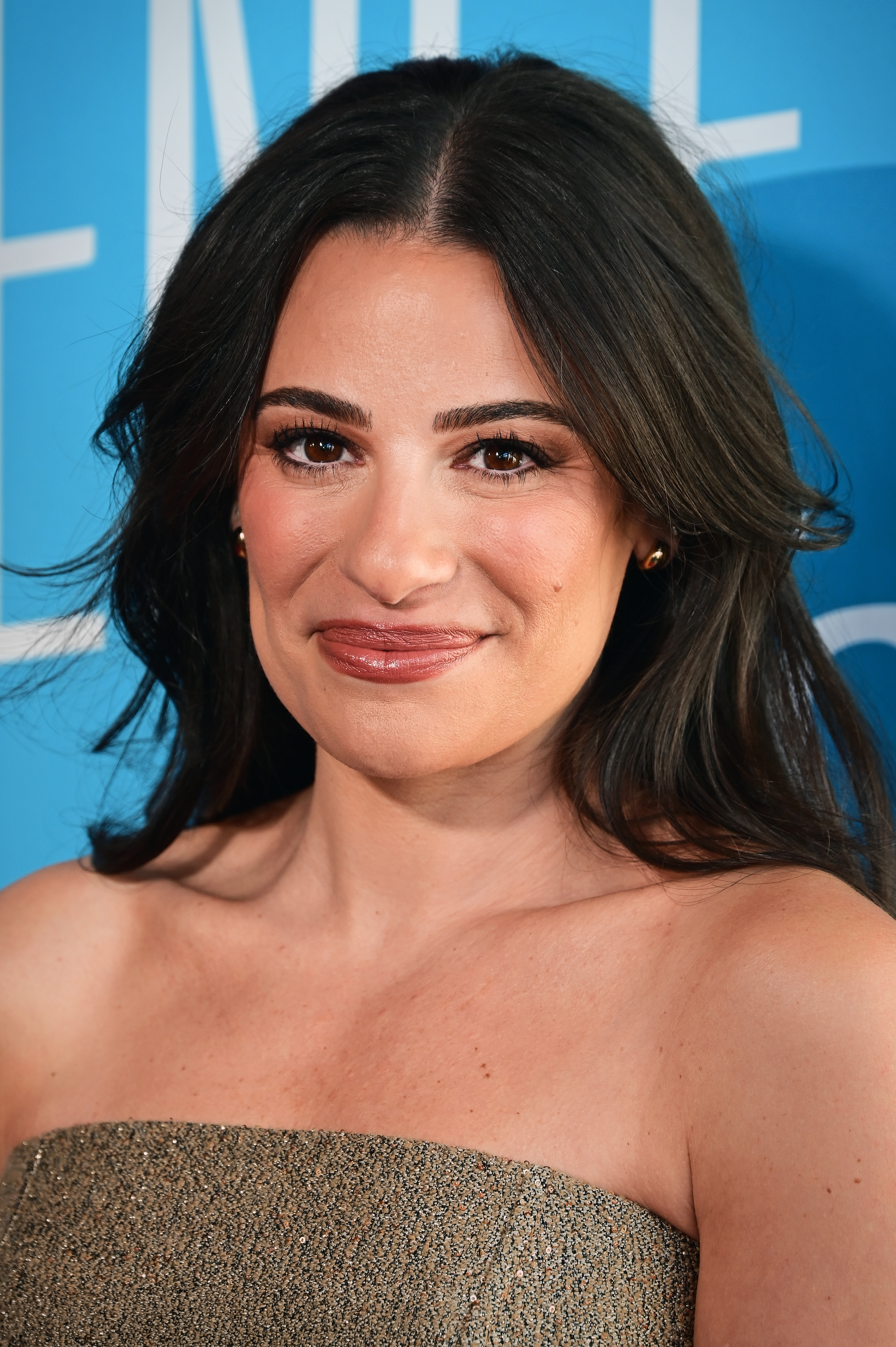
- Michele in 2026
- Born: Lea Michele Sarfati; August 29, 1986 (age 40); The Bronx, New York, U.S.
- Occupations: Actress; singer; songwriter; author
- Years active: 1995–present
- Works: Performances; discography (Note: In addition to solo music, Michele has contributed as a member of the Glee cast to the series' discography. For information about said work, see Glee albums and singles discography and List of songs in Glee.)
- Spouse: Zandy Reich (m. 2019)
- Children: 2
- Awards: Full list
- Musical career
- Genres: Broadway; pop; vocal
- Instrument: Vocals
- Years active: 1996–present
- Label: Columbia
- Website: leamichele.com

Lea Michele Sarfati (/ˈliːə mɪˈʃɛl/ LEE-ə mish-EL; born August 29, 1986) is an American actress, singer, and songwriter. She began her career as a child actress on Broadway, appearing in productions of Les Misérables (1995–1996), Ragtime (1997–1999), Fiddler on the Roof (2004–2005), and Spring Awakening (2006–2008). She found prominence playing Rachel Berry on the Fox series Glee (2009–2015), receiving nominations for an Emmy Award and two Golden Globe Awards. She also contributed to music recorded for the series, which spawned multiple hits on the Billboard charts and earned her a Grammy Award nomination.

Michele made her feature film debut in New Year's Eve (2011). She starred as Hester Ulrich on the TV series Scream Queens (2015–2016) on Fox, and as Valentina Barella on the ABC sitcom The Mayor (2017). In 2012, she was signed to Columbia Records and released her debut single in 2013, "Cannonball". Next, her debut studio album, Louder (2014), came out, debuting at No. 4 on the Billboard 200 chart in the United States. In 2017, she released her second studio album, Places. In 2019, she released Christmas in the City, her third album, and in 2021 released her fourth studio album, Forever. Michele has also published two books, Brunette Ambition (2014) and You First: Journal Your Way to Your Best Life (2015).

In 2022, Michele returned to Broadway starring as Fanny Brice in the musical revival of Funny Girl, and received widespread acclaim for her performance. She starred as Florence in the 2025 Broadway revival of Chess opposite Aaron Tveit and Nicholas Christopher until June 21, 2026.

== Early life and education ==
Lea Michele Sarfati was born on August 29, 1986, in The Bronx, New York. She is the only child of Edith Thomasina (née Porcelli), a retired nurse, and Mark David Sarfati, a real estate agent and former delicatessen owner. Her mother is Italian American with ancestors from Rome and Naples, while her father is a Sephardic Jew with Judaeo-Spanish-speaking ancestors from Thessaloniki, Greece. Most of the Jews in Thessaloniki were killed during the Holocaust, including Michele's great-great-grandmother. (Note: Her paternal grandmother, Sylvia "Celia" (née Veissy), was born in New York. Sylvia's parents, Benouta "Bessie" (née Cohenka) and Morris Joseph Veissy, were born in Thessaloniki, Greece. (Who Do You Think You Are?, May 1, 2016)) Michele grew up with her mother's Catholic faith, and has said that her father "gladly" attended Mass with them. Until she was 4 she lived in the Bronx and her parents moved to a more suburban area, Tenafly, New Jersey. The family also rented an apartment in Manhattan, where they lived when Michele was performing on Broadway. Michele went to Rockland Country Day School for elementary school in Congers, New York.

Michele began using her middle name as a last name at an early age. When she went on her first audition, for the role of Cosette in Les Misérables, she gave her name as Lea Michele and has used it professionally ever since. She said that she intentionally did not use her surname because she was teased about its pronunciation. During the audition, she sang "Angel of Music" from The Phantom of the Opera – the only musical she knew at the time. Michele went along to support a friend, but ended up landing the part herself. In 1997, she was homeschooled while living and working in Toronto, where she performed in a production of Ragtime. For her high school education, Michele attended Tenafly High School in Tenafly, New Jersey. She was on the volleyball and debate teams, and participated in choir at the school. In her teens, when she was not working on the stage, she had a part-time job at a bat mitzvah dress shop. She also worked at her father's deli.

Michele refrained from auditioning for Broadway roles during her freshman, sophomore, and junior years to focus on her education. In the summers of 2000, 2001, and 2002, she attended Stagedoor Manor, a renowned performing arts training center in the Catskills. At Stagedoor, she was part of the touring troupe Our Time Cabaret, and performed in productions of Side by Side by Sondheim and The Who's Tommy. During her final summer at the camp, Michele was to perform in a production of Sweet Charity, but instead booked the role of Wendla Bergmann in a workshop of Spring Awakening, forcing her to drop out. She was later accepted to New York University's Tisch School of the Arts in Manhattan, but opted instead to continue working professionally on the stage. When she was 19 years old, her mother Edith was diagnosed with uterine cancer. Edith received treatment from Memorial Sloan Kettering Cancer Center on the Upper East Side in Manhattan.

== Career ==
=== 1995–2008: Beginnings and stage roles ===
Michele made her Broadway debut in 1995, at age 8, as a replacement in the role of Cosette in Les Misérables. She was also the understudy for the role of Gavroche followed by the role of the Little Girl in the 1998 original Broadway cast of Ragtime. She portrayed the part of the Little Girl for a year in the original Toronto cast, before the production transferred to Broadway. As a child, she voiced Christina, a main character in the animated film Buster & Chauncey's Silent Night, released on October 13, 1998. In 2004, Michele began portraying Shprintze in the Broadway revival of the musical Fiddler on the Roof, and was the understudy for the role of Chava. She performed on the cast recording of the show.

Michele next played the role of Wendla Bergmann in Steven Sater and Duncan Sheik's musical version of Spring Awakening, starring in early workshops and Off-Broadway performances, before finally originating the role in the 2006 Broadway production at 20. In February 2005, she performed as Wendla at the Lincoln Center for the Performing Arts. Around the same time that Spring Awakening was set to go to Broadway, Michele was offered the role of Éponine Thénardier in the Broadway revival of Les Misérables. She elected to remain with Spring Awakening, which premiered on Broadway in December 2006. For her performance, she was nominated for a Drama Desk Award for Outstanding Actress in a Musical. In January 2008, she starred as Phoebe in a concert production of the musical Alive in the World, benefiting the Twin Towers Orphan Fund.

In April 2008, she performed a Flops n' Cutz concert at Joe's Pub in the East Village with her boyfriend at the time, stage actor Landon Beard. She debuted her solo cabaret Once Upon a Dream at Feinstein's at the Loews Regency. In May 2008, she and her co-star Jonathan Groff left the Broadway cast of Spring Awakening. She performed as Claudia Octavia in a reading of Sheik and Sater's new musical, Nero, in July 2008 at Vassar College in Poughkeepsie, New York. In August 2008, Michele portrayed Éponine in the Hollywood Bowl's Les Misérables concert, which was directed by Richard Jay-Alexander. She starred alongside Brian Stokes Mitchell, who played Javert, and John Lloyd Young, who played Marius Pontmercy, each of whom later guest-starred on Glee. While in Los Angeles for the Les Misérables concerts, she sang at the Upright Cabaret at Mark's Restaurant in Hollywood in August 2008. In September 2008, she performed at the benefit Broadway Chance Style: Up Close & Personal along with Laura Bell Bundy, Eden Espinosa, Kristoffer Cusick, and other stars.

=== 2009–2012: Glee and mainstream success ===
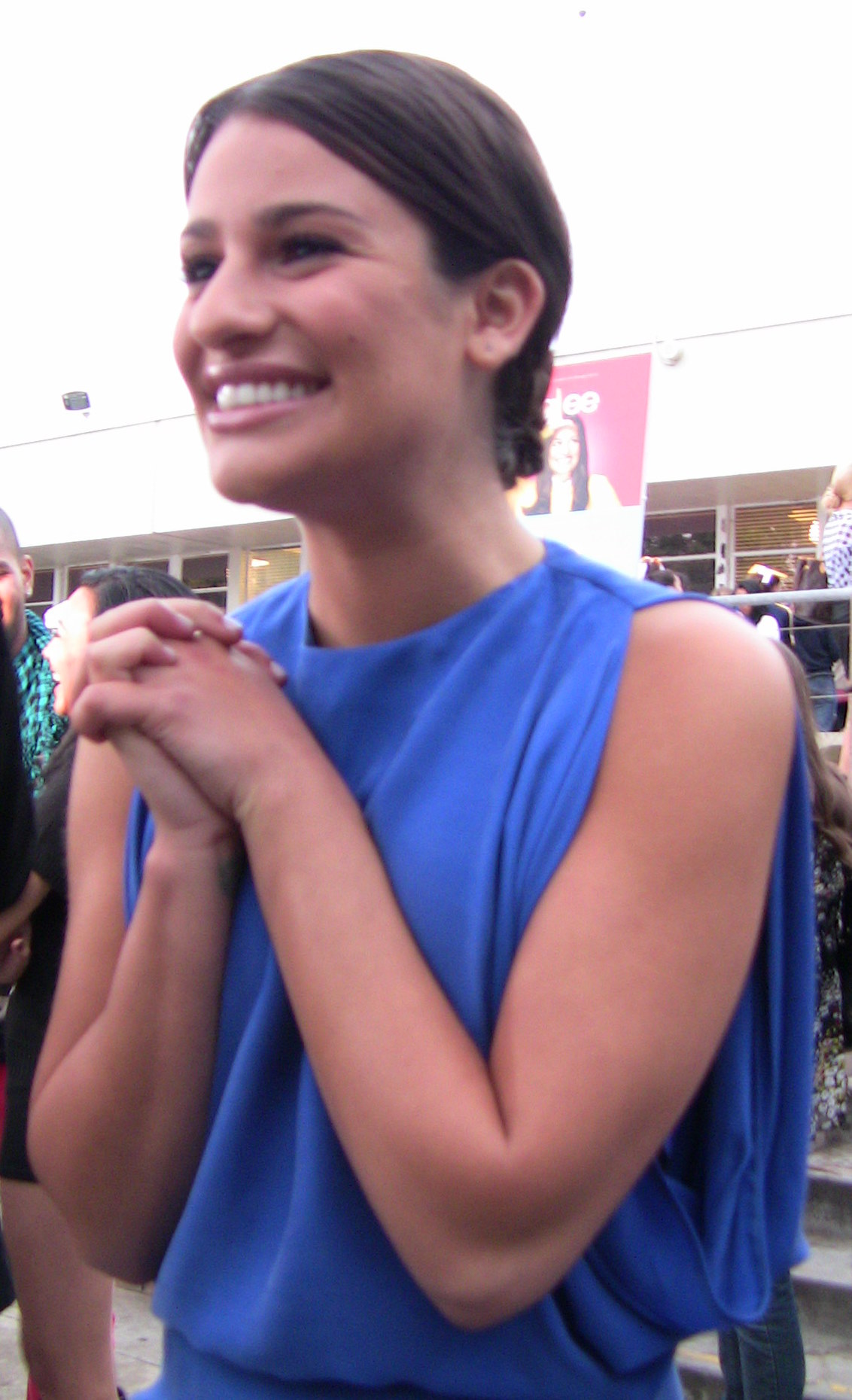
Michele at the premiere of Glee, May 11, 2009

From 2009 until it ended in 2015, Michele starred in Glee, a Fox musical comedy-drama series, as Rachel Berry, the show's female lead and star singer. The role was written specifically for Michele by the show's co-creator Ryan Murphy. She won a number of awards for portraying Rachel, including the 2009 Satellite Award for Best Actress – Television Series Musical or Comedy. She was also nominated for the 2009 Golden Globe Award for Best Actress – Television Series Musical or Comedy, and the 2010 Primetime Emmy Award for Outstanding Lead Actress in a Comedy Series.

Michele was included on Time's list of the 100 Most Influential People In the World for 2010. In December 2010, she received Billboard's first-ever Triple Threat Award. Several songs performed by Michele on the show were released as singles available for digital download. Her cover of The All-American Rejects' song "Gives You Hell" reached the top 40 on the Billboard Hot 100. She was the lead singer for 14 of the top 20 best-selling Glee cast songs as of 2010. In 2011, she was nominated for two Grammy Awards, for Best Pop Performance by a Duo or Group with Vocals ("Don't Stop Believin'") and Best Compilation Soundtrack Album (Glee: The Music, Volume 1). Also in 2011, Michele was nominated again for the Golden Globe Award for Best Actress – Television Series Musical or Comedy. In 2012 and 2013, she won the People's Choice Award for Favorite TV Comedy Actress.

In May 2010, Michele and the cast of Glee embarked on a U.S. tour playing 10 shows in Phoenix, Los Angeles, Chicago, and New York City. The final show of 2010 was at Radio City Music Hall. Jonathan Groff, who played Michele's love interest Jesse St. James on the show, performed with her at the Los Angeles and New York City shows. Glee Live! In Concert! expanded in 2011 to include 22 shows across North America and nine shows in England and Ireland. The cast acted in character for the concerts, which received positive reviews.

In October 2010, Michele and co-star Matthew Morrison performed as Janet Weiss and Brad Majors, respectively, in the 35th anniversary benefit concert of The Rocky Horror Picture Show. It benefited The Painted Turtle summer camp in Lake Hughes, California, and starred Jack Nicholson and Danny DeVito. In February 2011, she performed at the Grammys' MusiCares Person of the Year event in Los Angeles, honoring Barbra Streisand. Michele sang "My Man" from the Streisand film Funny Girl. Before the Super Bowl XLV on February 6, 2011, she performed "America the Beautiful" with the United States Air Force group Tops In Blue. She then starred in Garry Marshall's romantic comedy film New Year's Eve playing Elise, a back-up singer and the love interest of Ashton Kutcher's character. The film was released worldwide on December 9, 2011.

=== 2013–2016: Louder and Scream Queens ===
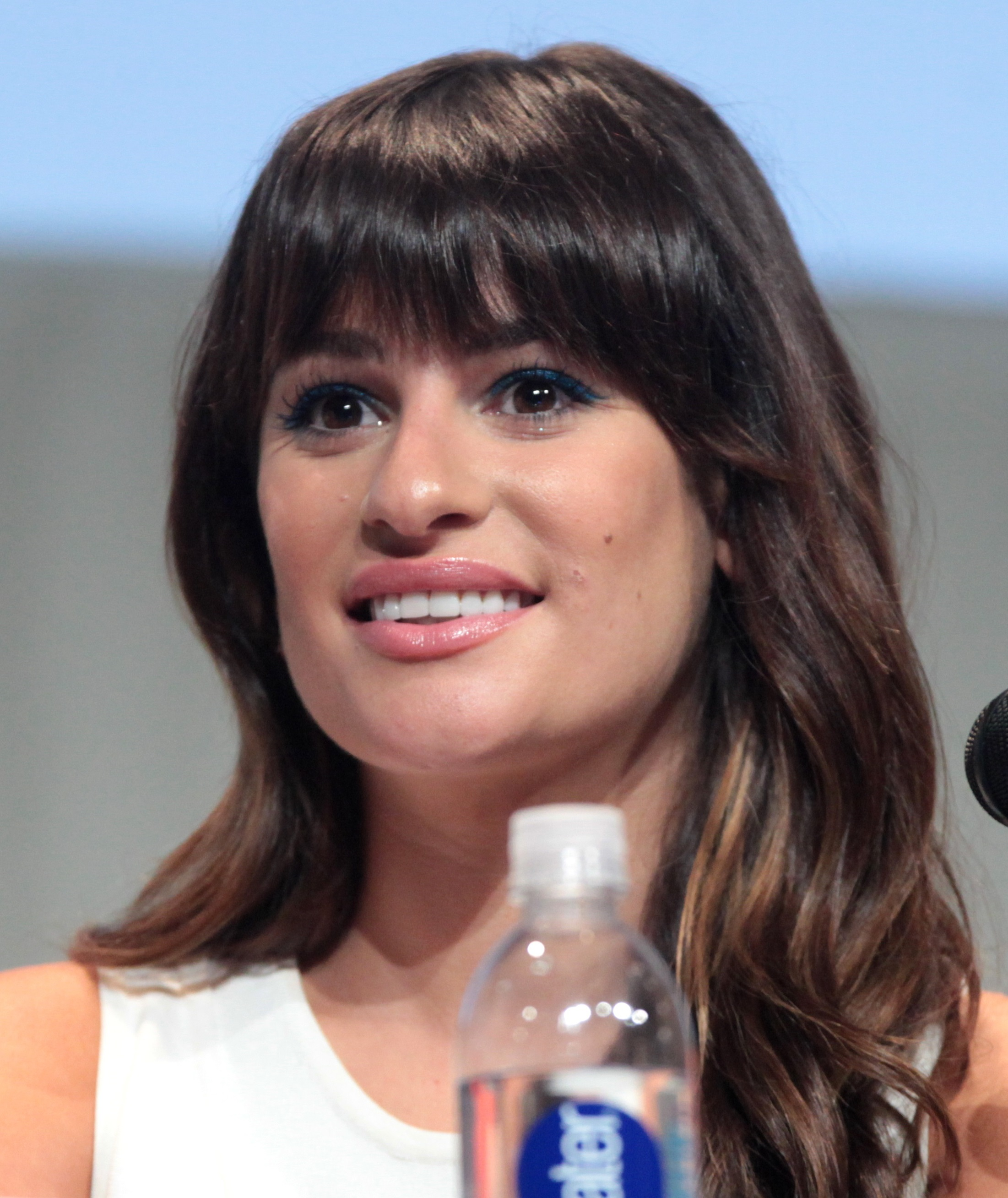
Michele at the 2015 San Diego Comic-Con

On September 18, 2012, it was announced that Michele would work on her first solo album. She began recordings for the album on October 19, 2012. She said that it was a "pretty slow process" and the album would be more "pop/rock driven" rather than Broadway influenced. On November 27, 2013, it was announced that the first single from her debut album Louder would be "Cannonball", which was released on December 10, 2013. "Cannonball" debuted at No. 75 on the Billboard Hot 100, and Michele became the first main Glee cast member to have a song chart as a lead soloist. The single sold more than 51,000 copies in its first week of sale. The music video was released on January 9, 2014. Michele then released four promotional singles in the lead-up to the album: "Battlefield", "Louder", "What Is Love?", and "You're Mine". Louder was released on February 28, 2014 and debuted on the Billboard 200 at No. 4 selling more than 62,000 copies in its first week. The second single from the album, "On My Way", was released on May 4, 2014, and the music video premiered on May 19, 2014.

Michele voiced the lead role of Dorothy Gale in the animated musical film Legends of Oz: Dorothy's Return, which opened in North American theaters on May 9, 2014. In May 2013, it was announced that she had signed a deal with Harmony Books and Random House to pen a part memoir, part how-to book titled Brunette Ambition and the book was published on May 20, 2014. She had multiple book signings in the United States, including a signing and Q&A event hosted by Jonathan Groff. The book debuted at No. 9 on the Nonfiction Best Seller list a week after it was released, and debuted on The New York Times Best Seller list at No. 3. Michele released a second book, You First: Journal Your Way to Your Best Life, on September 22, 2015, which was also published by Random House.

In July 2014, it was announced that Michele would guest star in the final season of FX's drama series Sons of Anarchy, playing the role of Gertie, a truck stop waitress who connects with Gemma Teller Morrow (Katey Sagal). Michele's episode, "Smoke 'em If You Got 'em", aired on October 14, 2014. From 2015 to 2016, Michele starred in the Fox horror-comedy series Scream Queens, alongside original scream queen Jamie Lee Curtis, portraying the quirky, neck brace-wearing Hester Ulrich. She was nominated for the People's Choice Award for Favorite Actress in a New TV Series, and two Teen Choice Awards for Choice TV Actress: Comedy and Choice TV: Villain for her performance in the role. On March 15, 2016, the charity single "This Is for My Girls", on which Michele was one of eight featured singers, was released as a charity single. The song, written by Diane Warren, benefited the White House's #62MillionGirls campaign and the Obama administration's Let Girls Learn initiative, set up by Michelle Obama, the First Lady.

=== 2017–2021: Further television work and albums ===
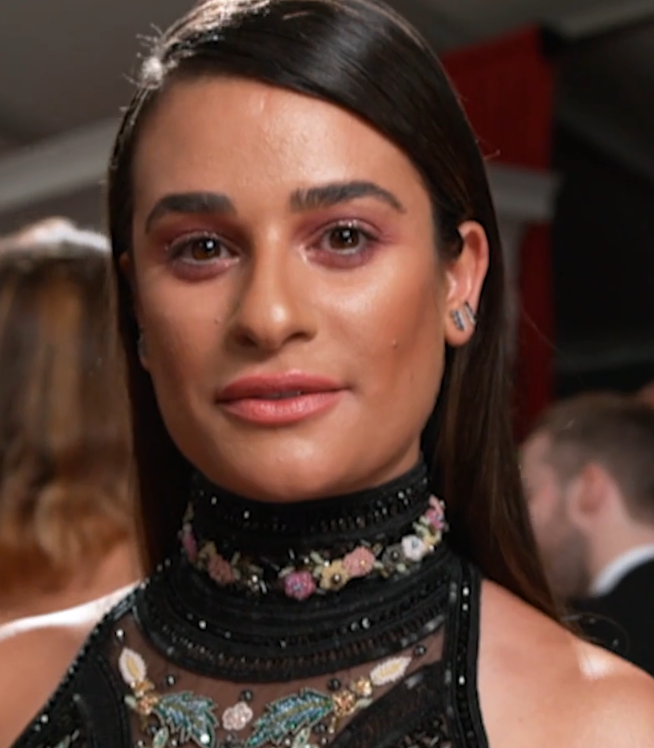
Michele at the 59th Annual Grammy Awards in February 2017

Michele began recording for her second studio album in April 2015. She stated that the album would be less pop-influenced than her debut and that she would be going back to her roots with a more theatrical sound. In January 2017, she played three shows on a mini tour titled An Intimate Evening with Lea Michele, supporting her second studio album, Places. The tour continued with additional shows in the UK and North America in April and May 2017. The lead single from the second album, "Love Is Alive", was released on March 3, 2017. Three promotional singles were released as a lead-up to the album: "Anything's Possible", "Run to You", and "Getaway Car". Places was released on April 28, 2017, and debuted at No. 28 on the Billboard 200 chart with over 16,000 units sold in its first week.

On April 4, 2017, Michele appeared as Amanda in the first episode of Dimension 404, Hulu's science fiction anthology series, alongside Robert Buckley and Joel McHale. She subsequently portrayed political advisor Valentina Barella in ABC's sitcom The Mayor, created by Jeremy Bronson and executive produced by Daveed Diggs, starring opposite Brandon Micheal Hall and Yvette Nicole Brown. On October 8, 2017, Michele performed as a headlining act at the third annual Elsie Fest held in Central Park founded by her Glee co-star Darren Criss. In April 2018, it was announced that she and Criss would co-headline a tour (the LM/DC Tour). It included shows in several North American cities in May and June 2018. and had stops in the United Kingdom and Ireland from October to December 2018. In May 2019, it was announced that Michele would host a health and wellness digital series for the Ellen DeGeneres Network, titled Well, Well, Well with Lea Michele. Michele's third studio album, Christmas in the City, was released on October 25, 2019. She starred as the lead in Same Time, Next Christmas, a film for ABC. From December 19, 2019, Lea Michele performed live in a series of shows at Adler Hall on the Upper West Side of Manhattan. Michele released her cover album, Forever: A Lullaby Album, on November 5, 2021.

=== 2022–present: Broadway return ===
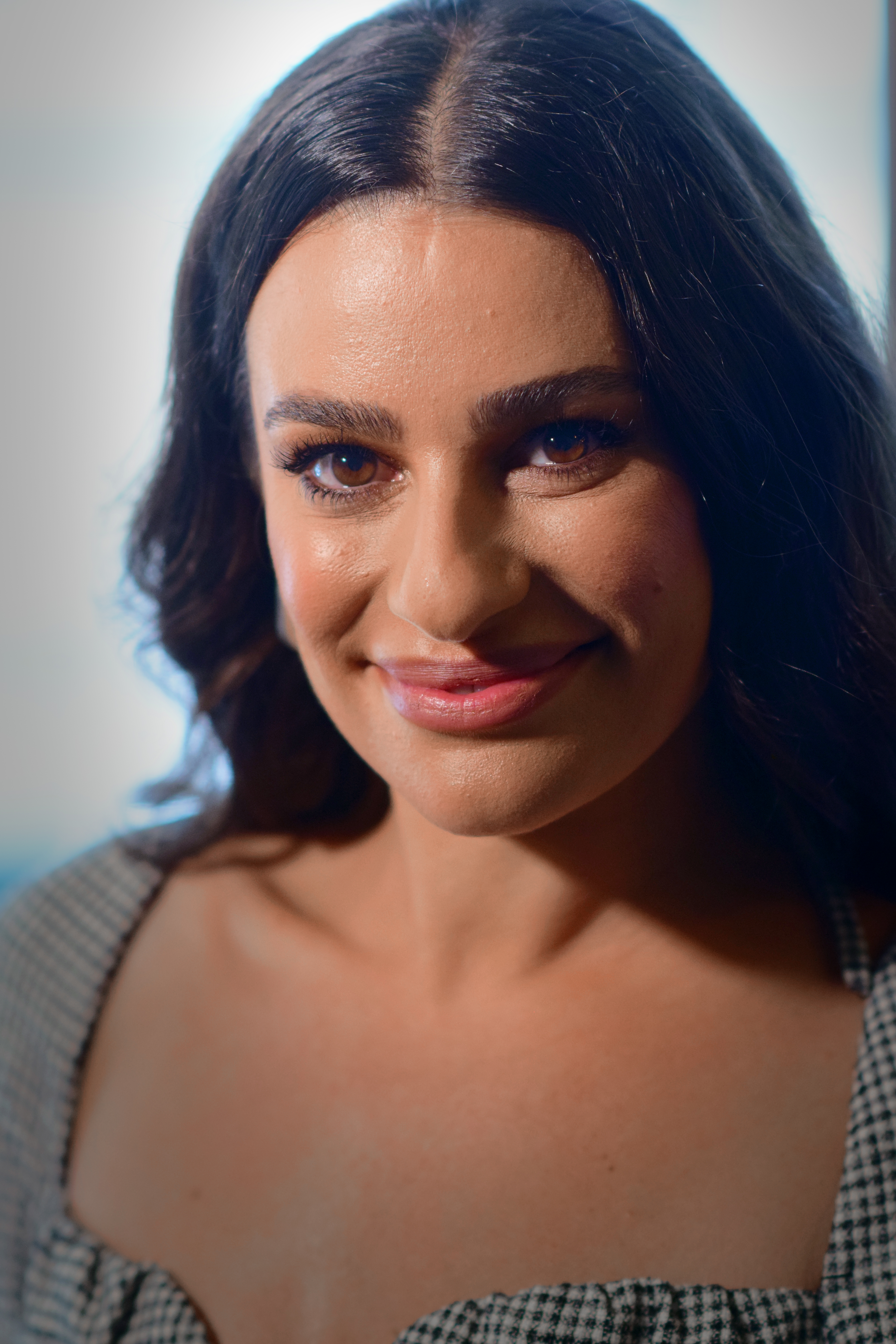
Michele photographed during the run of Funny Girl in September 2022

On July 11, 2022, it was announced that Michele would return to Broadway in the stage musical production of Funny Girl. Michele replaced Beanie Feldstein in the leading role of Fanny Brice on September 6, 2022, after Feldstein announced that she was leaving the production two months earlier than originally planned. Michele starred opposite Ramin Karimloo, who played the role of Nick Arnstein. She was scheduled to perform seven shows a week, excluding Thursday evenings. The parallels between Michele taking on the role and her Glee character's story line where she lands her dream role in the musical's first Broadway revival have been widely discussed in the media. Her character's obsession with the musical was written into Glee in part because of Michele's own interest in it since she first saw the movie adaptation in 2007. On September 11, 2022, four days into her run as Fanny Brice, Michele announced that she had tested positive for COVID-19, requiring her to be in isolation for at least 10 days. She returned to the stage on September 20, 2022.

Critics widely praised Michele's performance. On opening night, Michele received seven standing ovations for her performance, which had been highly anticipated. Jackson McHenry with Vulture wrote, "With every eye roll toward the audience and every belt, Michele seems to face the pressure to not just be good, or great, but the greatest. This is less a star vehicle than gladiatorial combat. She makes it through with blood on the sand." Jesse Green, writing for The New York Times, initially gave the musical a poor review when it starred Feldstein. After seeing Michele's iteration, he praised her performance, while maintaining his criticisms of the overall production, saying, "Both vulnerable and invulnerable, kooky and ardent, [Michele] makes the show worth watching again. She can't make it good, though. Michael Mayer's production is still garish and pushy, pandering for audience overreaction." The show had its final performance on September 3, 2023. Michele was named one of the 100 most influential people in the world by Time in 2023.

In May 2025, Michele was cast as Florence Vassy in the 2025 Broadway revival of Chess opposite Aaron Tveit and Nicholas Christopher, starting on October 15, 2025, at the Imperial Theatre. She was nominated for a Drama League Award for her performance.

== Artistry ==
=== Influences ===
One of the most significant influential figures in Michele's life is Barbra Streisand, whom she cites as being her "role model". Michele's mother Edith played Streisand's films for her when she was a child. Michele dedicated a chapter in her book, Brunette Ambition, to Streisand, noting that it is important for people to have someone to look up to. Michele wrote, "I really love her, she's always been such a role model to me. She's someone who has built her career on focusing on what makes her unique and what makes her special." Another actress who influenced Michele was Natalie Wood. Michele said that she watched West Side Story as a child, wanting to play the role of Maria.

Actress and singer Audra McDonald has also been an influence on Michele. Michele told The Fresno Bee, "Audra is probably the best singer in the world—up there with Barbra. I don't think she has any idea what an influence she had on me. I would say 80 percent of my singing knowledge came from Audra. . . . How to warm up. How to breathe. How to take care of my voice. All of my beliefs are because Audra instilled them in me." Recording artist Alanis Morissette has been an inspiration throughout Michele's career. Morissette's album Jagged Little Pill was the first album Michele purchased, and in a 2014 interview Michele said she still owns it. She said, "I love Alanis Morissette. . . . All of her songs are lyrically so beautiful and vocally she's so strong." Celine Dion has also influenced Michele as a singer.

=== Voice ===
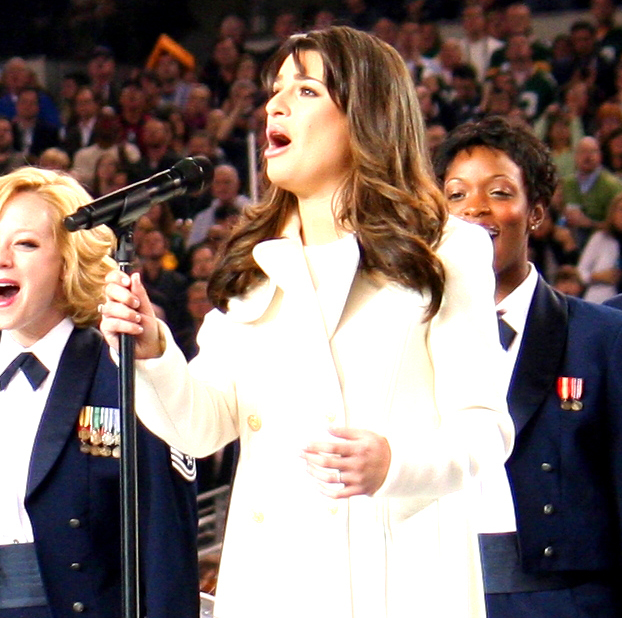
Michele performing America the Beautiful at the Super Bowl XLV on February 6, 2011

Michele possesses a soprano vocal range. As of 2013, her voice reportedly spans approximately three octaves. Her vocals have been lauded, however, Christopher Weingarten of Rolling Stone felt that Michele's voice is "a little too perfect" for pop music charts. The Boston Globe said that her voice is a "mighty soprano" and her vocals are most comfortable when she "straddles the line between Katy Perry and Celine Dion." Hanh Nguyen wrote on Zap2it about Michele's voice on the Glee Live! In Concert! tour, "One can truly hear the quality of the live vocals, which in the case of Lea Michele is the real deal. She sounds even better than on the show. . . . Her "Don't Rain on My Parade" live is an amazing and thrilling treat." Billboard said that her live performance of "Love Is Alive" on The Late Late Show with James Corden "emotional performance showcased Michele's strong vocal ability."

== Reception and public image ==
Michele has received multiple accolades throughout her career. Her breakthrough performance as Rachel Berry in Glee received widespread recognition. For the role, she was nominated for the Primetime Emmy Award for Outstanding Lead Actress in a Comedy Series in 2010 and twice consecutively for the Golden Globe Award for Best Actress in a Television Series – Musical or Comedy; and once in 2011 for the Grammy Award for Best Pop Performance by a Duo or Group with Vocals for the cast performance of "Don't Stop Believin'". As a member of the series' ensemble cast, Michele won a Screen Actors Guild Award for Outstanding Performance by an Ensemble in a Comedy Series once in 2010 out of four consecutive nominations. Prior to Glee, she received some recognition on stage, earning a Drama Desk Award nomination for her role in a 2007 production of Spring Awakening. In 2022, she returned to Broadway playing Fanny Brice in a revival of Funny Girl, to widespread critical acclaim.

In June 2020, actress Samantha Marie Ware accused Michele of bullying her and causing "traumatic microaggressions" while they worked together on the sixth season of Glee. Ware made the comments in direct response to Michele having posted a message on social media saying "George Floyd did not deserve this. This was not an isolated incident and it must end. #BlackLivesMatter." Other actors including former Glee co-stars Heather Morris, Alex Newell, and Amber Riley agreed that Michele had been hostile and rude to others on the set and had a prima donna attitude. Riley and Morris disputed the implication that Michele's behavior had been racist. Michele responded with an apology, saying that the comments from many cast members in response to Ware's accusation had made her aware that her general treatment of all cast members during those years was "insensitive or inappropriate", a sign of "immaturity", and that she was "unnecessarily difficult" toward others around her, and she would "keep working to better [herself] and take responsibility for [her] actions."

Michele has been the subject of rumors, conspiracy theories, and jokes that she is illiterate since 2017, with the rumor becoming a popular Internet meme in March 2018 and again in 2022. The rumor started with Jaye Hunt and Robert Ackerman of the podcast One More Thing as they were discussing a scene from Naya Rivera's memoir Sorry Not Sorry in which Michele refused to improvise scenes with Tim Conway. Michele responded in an interview with The New York Times in September 2022, saying, "I went to Glee every single day; I knew my lines every single day, and then there's a rumor online that I can't read or write? It's sad. It really is. I think often if I were a man, a lot of this wouldn't be the case." Michele addressed the rumor again in 2025 on Jake Shane's podcast and said that she was on a debate team in school before reading aloud Shane's notecards to prove she could read. She had also previously joked about the conspiracy theory on social media.

== Other projects ==
=== Philanthropy ===
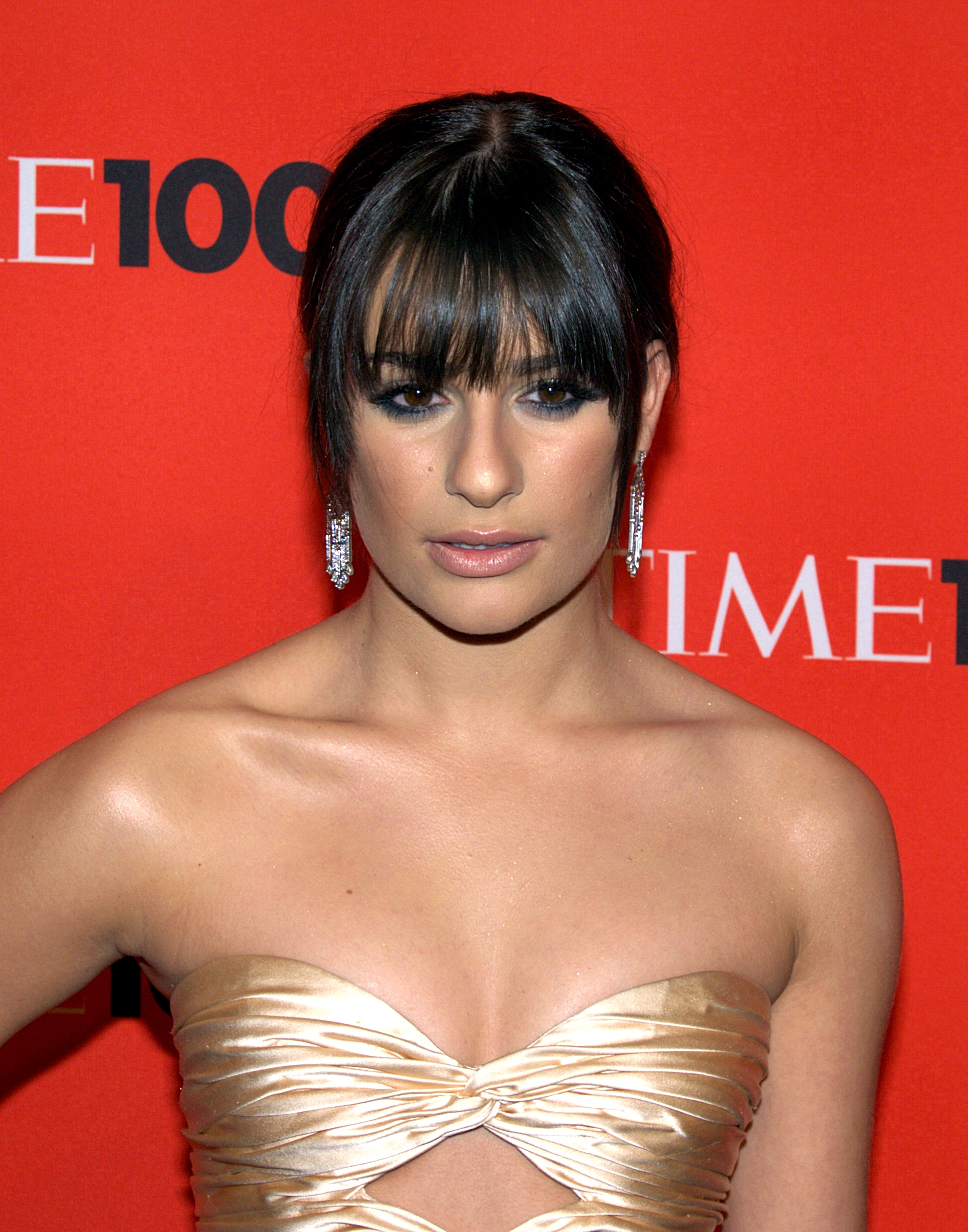
Lea Michele at the 2010 Time 100 event at Lincoln Center in Manhattan, New York

Michele supported Broadway Cares/Equity Fights AIDS, performing Off-Broadway at Unsung: 'Tis the Season to Be Naughty in December 2007 at the Lucille Lortel Theatre. She has participated in Broadway Barks, Broadway Bares, the Easter Bonnet Competition, and the Broadway Flea Market & Grand Auction. She has been active in campaigning for animal rights; in 2008, she appeared in PETA's advertising campaign "Buck Cruelty! Say No to Horse-Drawn Carriage Rides". In 2008, Michele performed in a benefit concert production of Alive in the World to aid the Twin Towers Orphan Fund. In support of gay rights, she performed at the Human Rights Campaign dinner in November 2009. Also in November 2009, Michele and Jonathan Groff performed for True Colors Cabaret, a fundraiser in support of gay, lesbian, bisexual and transgender equality. In April 2010, she appeared in a PETA public service announcement, speaking out against fur clothing. In September 2010, she was honored by PETA for her work with animals. In 2010, Michele was named to the Time 100 list for her artistic talent and the ability to influence student participation in school activities.

In October 2010, Michele performed at a benefit concert for The Painted Turtle summer camp. The concert celebrated the 35th anniversary of The Rocky Horror Picture Show, with Michele playing the lead role of Janet Weiss. In February 2011, she performed for the Grammy Award's MusiCares benefit in Los Angeles. In April 2012, she performed for the Jonsson Cancer Center Foundation's 17th annual signature fundraiser, Taste for a Cure, at the University of California, Los Angeles (UCLA) with her Glee co-star Darren Criss. In October 2012, she and Criss performed together at the Big Brothers Big Sisters of Greater Los Angeles 2012 Stars Gala. In July 2012, she hosted the launch of Valspar's Hands for Habitat charity auction, donating a signed hand print to be auctioned. The money raised from the auction went to Habitat for Humanity's disaster response programs. Michele has been an ambassador for L'Oréal's Women of Worth program since December 2012, celebrating women who have positively impacted their communities. In June 2013, she co-hosted the launch of Feed America for Target. Proceeds from the lifestyle collection benefited Feeding America based in Chicago.

In August 2013, Michele again donated a hand print to the Valspar Hands for Habitat charity auction. She was the host of the fundraiser "Lea Michele's Night of Shopping and Cocktails" on December 14, 2013, presented by SodaStream, which benefited Chrysalis, a non-profit organization helping homeless people find work. In April 2014, Michele and Criss again performed together at the 19th annual Taste for a Cure event for the Jonsson Cancer Center Foundation. In October 2014, she teamed up with Evian to encourage women to perform their own breast exams in an attempt to raise awareness of early cancer detection. In February 2016, it was announced that Michele would collaborate with Burt's Bees in a campaign to raise awareness of the declining population of bees.

In June 2016, the Human Rights Campaign released a video in tribute to the victims of the 2016 Pulse nightclub shooting in Orlando, Florida, in which Michele and other celebrities recounted the stories of the people killed there. She continues to support the non-profit Step Up based in Los Angeles and attends the annual Step Up Inspiration Awards. In April 2017, Barnes & Noble donated a portion of every purchase of Places (Michele's second album) to Step Up. In November 2017, she partnered with eBay to design a pin to benefit Feeding America and auctioned off a visit to the set of one of her 2018 projects. In April 2019, she performed for the "A Grand Night" fundraising gala held at the Mark Taper Forum in Los Angeles. On May 1, 2019, Michele joined Michelle Obama at Reach Higher's 2019 College Signing Day. On November 24, 2019, she visited ill children at the Children's Healthcare of Atlanta hospital. In October 2023, she signed the "No Hostage Left Behind" letter, an open letter asking President Joe Biden to ensure the release of hostages kidnapped by Hamas during the October 7 attacks.

=== Product endorsements ===
In 2007, Michele and her Spring Awakening co-stars were featured in a Gap Inc. marketing campaign including magazine advertisements and billboards in Times Square in Manhattan. In 2010, Michele became a spokesmodel for beauty company Dove, performing the song "My Favorite Things" from The Sound of Music in Dove television commercials. In 2011, she appeared in a Super Bowl XLV commercial for Chevrolet, along with most of her Glee co-stars. She performed the song "See the USA in Your Chevrolet" as Rachel Berry. Also in 2011, she was the spokesperson for Nike's Training Club app. In September 2011, she appeared in commercials for Hewlett-Packard's HP TouchPad.

In January 2012, Candie's announced that Michele would be the spokesmodel for their brand, taking over from Vanessa Hudgens who was the face of the brand in 2011. In September 2012, it was revealed that Michele had signed an estimated $1 million deal to be a spokesperson for L'Oréal Paris. She has appeared in magazine ads and television commercials promoting their products. In September 2015, Pixelberry Studios announced their collaboration with Michele, launching High School Story with Lea Michele, a celebrity takeover update of their popular app. In December 2018 she and Old Navy and Lyft teamed to announce free car sharing to stores for holidays. In February 2019, she appeared in a commercial for Zola, a wedding website.

Michele had a partnership with HelloFresh, a meal kit delivery service, until June 2, 2020. The company announced they had ended their partnership with her as a result of a controversy surrounding accusations of bullying against Michele.

== Personal life ==
=== Relationships ===
Michele dated Glee co-star Matthew Morrison "back in the day for a Broadway beat," she said in her memoir, Brunette Ambition. Michele began working with actor Cory Monteith in 2008, when they were cast as love interests on Glee. In February 2012, the media reported that they had begun dating. They remained together until his death in July 2013.

Michele and businessman Zandy Reich married on March 9, 2019, in Napa, California. They have two children: a son, born in August 2020, and a daughter, born in August 2024.

Michele has an enduring friendship with and enjoys mutual professional and personal support from Jonathan Groff. The two starred together in Glee, Spring Awakening and multiple other shows.

=== Health ===
In September 2019, Michele revealed that she had polyendocrine metabolic ovarian syndrome (PMOS). She was diagnosed around the age of 30, having struggled with symptoms including weight gain and acne since the end of Glee.

== Performances ==
=== Film and television ===
- Buster & Chauncey's Silent Night (1998)
- Glee (2009–2015)
- Glee: The 3D Concert Movie (2011)
- New Year's Eve (2011)
- Scream Queens (2015–2016)
- The Mayor (2017–2018)

=== Stage ===
- Les Misérables (1995–1996)
- Ragtime (1997–1999; 2023)
- The Diary of Anne Frank (2004)
- Fiddler on the Roof (2004–2005)
- Spring Awakening (2006–2008; 2021)
- Les Misérables (2008)
- The Rocky Horror Show (2010)
- The Little Mermaid (2019)
- Funny Girl (2022–2023)
- Chess (2025–2026)

=== Concert tours and residencies ===
- Once Upon a Dream (2008)
- Glee Live! In Concert! (2010–2011)
- An Intimate Evening with Lea Michele (2017)
- LM/DC Tour (with Darren Criss) (2018)
- Christmas in NYC: Live in Concert (2019)
- Spring Awakening Reunion Concert (2021)
- Life in Music Tour (2022)
- Carnegie Hall debut (2023)
- Lea Michele Live (2025)

== Discography ==
- Louder (2014)
- Places (2017)
- Christmas in the City (2019)
- Forever (2021)

=== Cast recordings ===
- 1996: Ragtime (Original Broadway Cast Recording)
- 2004: Fiddler on the Roof (2004 New Broadway Cast Recording)
- 2006: Spring Awakening (Original Broadway Cast Recording)
- 2021: Some Lovers (Original Studio Cast Recording)
- 2022: Funny Girl (2022 New Broadway Cast Recording)
- 2026: Chess (2025 New Broadway Cast Recording)

=== Soundtracks ===
- 2009-2015: Glee: The Music 16 soundtracks, 6 compilations, 11 EP's
- 2010: The Sound of Music (45th Anniversary Special Edition)
- 2011: New Year's Eve (Original Motion Picture Soundtrack)
- 2014: Legends of Oz: Dorothy Returns (Original Motion Picture Soundtrack)

== Written works ==
- Brunette Ambition (2014)
- You First: Journal Your Way to Your Best Life (2015)

== See also ==
- List of songs in Glee (seasons 1, 2, 3, 4, 5 and 6)
