= Glee: The 3D Concert Movie =

2011 American 3D concert documentary film

- Theatrical release poster
- Directed by: Kevin Tancharoen
- Produced by: Dante Di Loreto; Ryan Murphy
- Starring: Dianna Agron; Chris Colfer; Darren Criss; Kevin McHale; Lea Michele; Cory Monteith; Heather Morris; Amber Riley; Naya Rivera; Mark Salling; Jenna Ushkowitz; Harry Shum Jr.; Chord Overstreet; Ashley Fink
- Cinematography: Glen MacPherson
- Edited by: Myron I. Kerstein; Jane Moran; Tatiana S. Riegel
- Music by: James S. Levine
- Production companies: Ryan Murphy Productions; 20th Century Fox Television
- Distributed by: 20th Century Fox
- Release dates: July 3, 2011 (Odeon Leicester Square); August 6, 2011 (Los Angeles); August 12, 2011 (United States)
- Running time: 84 minutes
- Country: United States
- Language: English
- Budget: $9 million
- Box office: $18.7 million

Glee: The 3D Concert Movie is a 2011 American 3D concert documentary film directed by Kevin Tancharoen and produced by Dante Di Loreto and Ryan Murphy. It is based on the Fox television series Glee and features the cast performing during the Glee Live! In Concert! tour. The film was Cory Monteith and Mark Salling's final film roles before their deaths in July 2013 and January 2018 respectively.

The film was released theatrically by 20th Century Fox in the United States on August 12, 2011. The film received mixed reviews from critics and was a box office disappointment, grossing only $18 million worldwide on a $9 million budget.

== Synopsis ==
Glee: The 3D Concert Movie depicts a Glee Cast concert in East Rutherford, New Jersey during the group's 2011 Glee Live! In Concert! tour. It features behind-the-scenes footage, and a setlist of songs from the show's first and second seasons. As well as the behind-the-scenes footage, the film portrays the series' influence on teenagers, including one who is gay named Trenton, one with Asperger syndrome named Josey Pickering, and a cheerleader with short stature named Janae. The fan segments were created by documentary filmmaker Jennifer Arnold.

== Cast ==
- Dianna Agron as Quinn
- Chris Colfer as Kurt
- Darren Criss as Blaine
- Kevin McHale as Artie
- Lea Michele as Rachel
- Cory Monteith as Finn
- Heather Morris as Brittany
- Amber Riley as Mercedes
- Naya Rivera as Santana
- Mark Salling as Puck
- Jenna Ushkowitz as Tina
- Harry Shum Jr. as Mike
- Chord Overstreet as Sam
- Ashley Fink as Lauren

Gwyneth Paltrow, who plays Holly Holliday on the series, appears uncredited (credited in the "songs performed by..." section, on the song "Forget You"), while Jane Lynch, who plays Sue Sylvester in the series, appears uncredited in an opening scene only included on the DVD/Blu-ray release. Ten actors and dancers appear as the Dalton Academy Warblers, joining Criss for a mini-set of three songs. Four of these Warblers appeared on the Glee TV series in the second season: Titus Makin Jr. (David), Curt Mega (Nick), Riker Lynch (Jeff), and Jon Hall (vocal percussionist).

== Production ==
=== Background ===
In May 2010, the Glee cast performed a sold-out 13-date North American concert tour. A European extension of the tour was announced in November of that year, and further North American dates were added for May and June 2011.

In early May 2011, it was announced that 20th Century Fox and series creator Ryan Murphy would together produce a 3-D film of the tour, directed by Kevin Tancharoen and shot during the North American leg. Murphy stated that the number of venues Glee Live! In Concert! could visit was limited, due to time constraints imposed by producing the television series, and as such, the film would enable a wider audience to experience the tour. Gary Newman, chairman of 20th Century Fox, expanded: "Part of what motivated us to do this movie in the first place is there was such a clamoring among Glee fans who said, 'Why didn't you bring this tour to my city?' They felt left out because we only went to four cities during our first tour. This movie will give fans—not just in the US but around the world—the chance to experience the 'Glee' concert in a visceral way." Newman said that the 3D format was chosen to give the audience "an immersing experience", and that the project is principally about "brand extension". He suggested that Glee is apt to work in the medium of film as many fans are teenagers and young adults, the prime concert film demographic, and are able to relate to Glee's central themes such as inclusion.

=== Filming ===
Filmed on June 16–17, 2011, at the Meadowlands Arena in East Rutherford, New Jersey, Glee: The 3D Concert Movie was shot with the Cameron-Pace Group's 3D Fusion camera system. Glen MacPherson served as director of photography, and utilised seven Fusion 3D rigs with a range of set-ups, including a Cablecam, Steadicam, and Technocrane. The digital cinematography cameras held by the rigs mainly comprised a combination of Arri Alexas and Red Epics. CPG CEO Vince Pace noted, "One of the biggest challenges that we were able to overcome was the way these cameras are handled in a live production environment (compared with a feature shoot). The infrastructure of (CPG's mobile 3D production truck) had to accommodate the multiple camera formats and process them as a single format. That is not common in the broadcast world." The production truck was updated accordingly, and acquired, amongst other new technology items, a Kayenne Video Production Center production switcher, which allowed for the creation of line cuts—explained by Vince as cuts "created live and used to capture the energy at the time of the performance." He cited this as a factor which helped enable the film's completion with just a six-week post-production schedule. Though Pace would not disclose the project's budget when interviewed by The Hollywood Reporter, he said that it was around 40% lower than previous 3D concert films, and narrowed the cost gap between 2D productions and CPG's earlier 3D works, such as Hannah Montana and Miley Cyrus: Best of Both Worlds Concert and Jonas Brothers: The 3D Concert Experience. Such budget was later revealed by The Hollywood Reporter to be $9 million.

== Release ==
Glee: The 3D Concert Movie premiered in Los Angeles on August 6, 2011, and received a nationwide release on August 12, 2011, playing in movie theaters from August 12 to 26, with sneak previews August 10, 2011 in select theaters. The film was released in the United Kingdom on August 19, 2011, also running for a two-week engagement. The press junket for the film was held in Los Angeles on August 6–7, 2011.

=== Critical reception ===
Review aggregator Rotten Tomatoes reports that 60% of 90 critics gave the film a positive review, with an average rating of 5.72/10. The site's critics consensus reads: "The unconverted will remain just as perplexed as ever, but for gleeful Gleeks, The 3D Concert Movie delivers exactly what it promises." On Metacritic the film has a weighted average score of 48 out of 100, based on 28 critics, indicating "mixed or average" reviews. Audiences polled by CinemaScore gave the film an average grade of "A" on an A+ to F scale.

=== Box office ===
The film opened exclusively in 3D in 2,040 theaters. It performed below expectations in its opening weekend, earning just $5.7 million and failing to appear in the box office top 10. The film was expected to open in the $10–12 million range. As of September 29, 2011, the film had grossed $11,862,398 domestically and $18,252,398 worldwide, based on a $9 million budget. In the United States, the film is the seventh highest-grossing music concert film of all time.

=== Home media ===
The film was released by 20th Century Fox Home Entertainment on DVD, though the DVD version is not identical to the film. At a press conference the day of the film's premiere, Ryan Murphy said, "We're doing another version in a couple of weeks on DVD". One announced difference between the versions is that Jane Lynch (Sue Sylvester), who does not appear in the film, does appear in the video. The film was released on December 20, 2011, in the United States, in DVD, Blu-ray, and 2-disc 3D Blu-ray formats. The UK edition, in these formats, was released earlier, on December 5, 2011. The film was released on Blu-ray in Australia on December 7, 2011.

== Setlist ==
The songs as performed in the film do not follow the order on the soundtrack album.

1. "Don't Stop Believin'" – Finn, Rachel, New Directions
2. "SING" – Rachel, Finn, New Directions
3. "Empire State of Mind" – Artie, Finn, Puck, Rachel, Mercedes, Santana, New Directions
4. "I'm a Slave 4 U" – Brittany
5. "Fat Bottomed Girls" – Puck
6. "Don't Rain on My Parade" – Rachel
7. "P.Y.T. (Pretty Young Thing)" – Artie
8. "Ain't No Way" – Mercedes
9. "Jessie's Girl" – Finn
10. "Valerie" – Santana
11. "Firework" – Rachel
12. "Teenage Dream" – Blaine, Warblers
13. "Silly Love Songs" – Blaine, Warblers
14. "Raise Your Glass" – Blaine, Warblers
15. "Happy Days Are Here Again / Get Happy" – Kurt, Rachel
16. "Safety Dance" – Artie
17. "Lucky" – Sam, Quinn
18. "River Deep – Mountain High" – Mercedes, Santana
19. "Forget You" – Holly, Artie, Mercedes, Santana, New Directions
20. "I Want to Hold Your Hand" – Kurt
21. "Born This Way" - Kurt, Tina, Mercedes, New Directions
22. "Loser like Me" – Rachel, Finn, Mercedes, Santana, Brittany, New Directions
23. "Don’t Stop Believin'" (end credits) – Finn, Rachel, New Directions
24. "Somebody to Love" – Finn, Rachel, Mercedes, Artie, New Directions
- "Dog Days Are Over", "Single Ladies" and "Friday" did not appear in the film, but were included on the home release.

== Soundtrack ==
A soundtrack accompanying the concert film titled, Glee: The 3D Concert Movie (Motion Picture Soundtrack) was released on August 9, 2011, by Columbia Records and Fox Music.
