= Glee Live! In Concert! =

2010–2011 concert tour

- Promotional tour by Glee cast
- Promotional poster for tour
- Location: North America • British Isles
- Associated album: Various
- Start date: May 15, 2010
- End date: July 3, 2011
- Legs: 3
- No. of shows: 32 in North America; 9 in the British Isles; 41 in total
- Website: www.gleetour.com

Glee Live! In Concert! was a 2010—2011 concert tour performed in-character by members of the cast of the popular television series Glee. The tour, created by series creator Ryan Murphy, was designed to build on the overwhelming response to the series, with Murphy stating that the series' soundtrack and concerts were an additional revenue stream from the series. The tour, which played in North America, the United Kingdom and Ireland, received positive responses from both music critics and fans of the series. The first North American leg of the tour in May 2010 played ten shows, in four cities, seen by over 70,000 spectators, generating over five million dollars in ticket sales and ranking ninth on the Billboard Hot Tours list. The 2011 tour was seen by an audience of over 485,000 and placed sixteenth on Billboard's annual Top 25 Tours list, earning over $40 million from 31 shows, played in 21 cities.

== Background ==
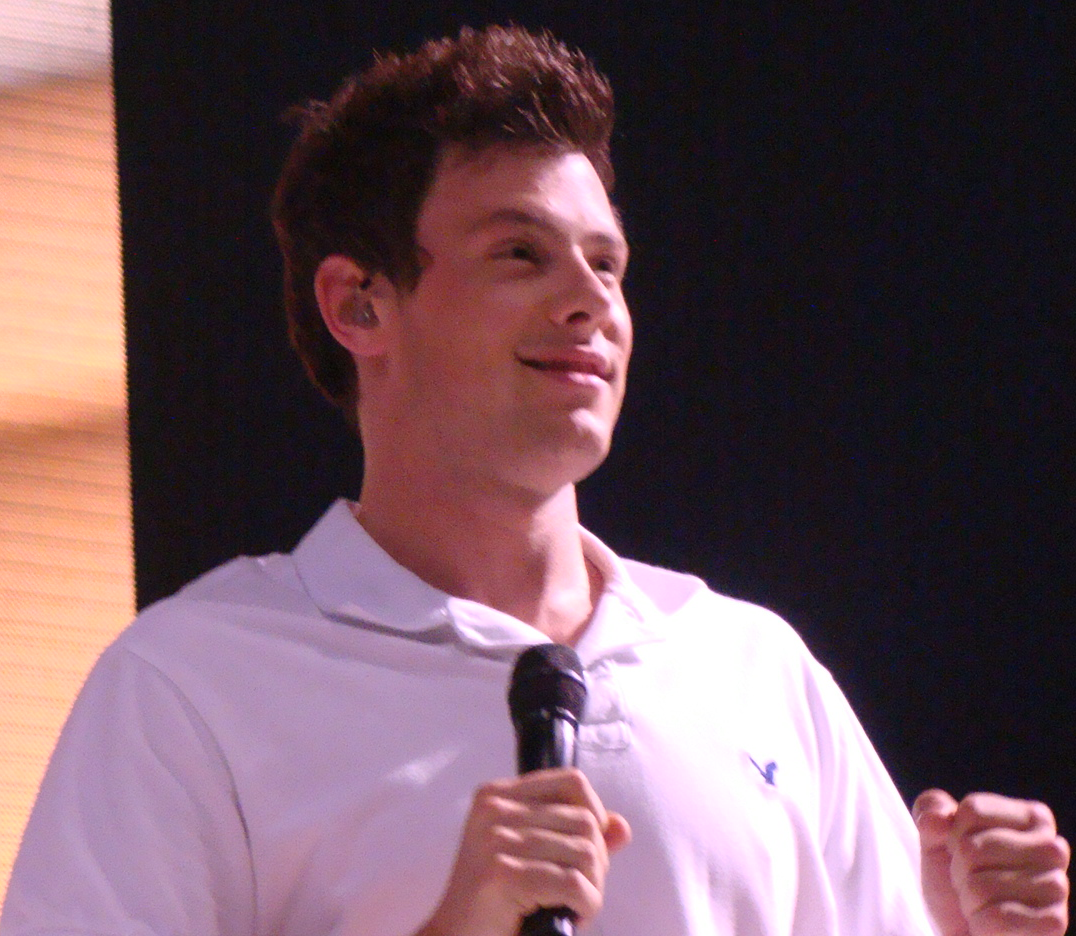
Monteith on the tour.

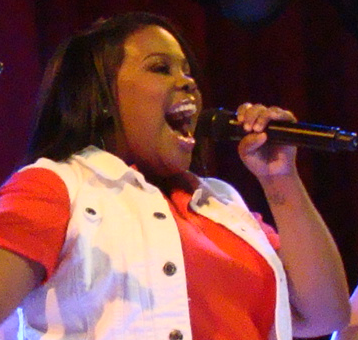
Riley on the tour.

The response of the fans to our little show has been so immediate and so gratifying, we wanted to get out and thank them live and in person," commented Murphy. "And what show lends itself more to a concert than ‘Glee?’ We can’t wait to take this show on the road and the actors couldn’t be more excited to perform live for audiences in these four cities.

— Ryan Murphy, Glee Live! press release

Initially, the cast of the series performed a small promotional tour ("The Gleek Tour") at various Hot Topic stores in the U.S. to showcase the series' soundtrack and to meet with fans of the show. This was followed with a performance of "The Star-Spangled Banner" at Citizens Bank Park for the 2009 World Series. A concert tour was hinted by several cast members via Twitter at the beginning of 2010. The success of the promotional outing lead to the creation of the concert tour. The tour was officially announced via Fox on March 1, 2010, at the conclusion of the first season. Lea Michele (Rachel Berry) expressed her excitement for the tour stating, "This has been such an extraordinary year for 'Glee' and I can’t think of a better way to finish up the first season than performing live on stage with the cast". Her comments were later shared by Cory Monteith (Finn Hudson) stating, "This show has changed my life in so many ways. If you had told me a year ago that I’d be performing classic rock songs in concert theaters around the country, I would never have believed you. We are psyched!". The tour performed over a dozen sell-out shows in the United States.

Special appearances were made by Jane Lynch (Sue Sylvester) and Matthew Morrison (Will Schuester) for a performance at the Radio City Music Hall in New York City. Jonathan Groff (Jesse St. James) performed along with Michele at the Gibson Amphitheatre in Los Angeles and at the Radio City Music Hall in New York City, New York.

As the series entered its second season, Fox announced an additional tour leg in the United Kingdom and Ireland. Murphy responds that the show in the U.S. saw an amazing response and the tour extension was to thank the fans overseas for their dedication to the series and promised an additional North American tour in the summer of 2011. Amber Riley (Mercedes Jones) shared the cast's enthusiasm for the tour extension remarking, "I loved performing for the fans in Los Angeles, Chicago, Phoenix and New York last year and didn’t think there was any way to top that experience. But performing in the great arenas of London, Manchester and Dublin? How cool is that? We cannot wait." Joining the tour extension are new cast members Chord Overstreet (Sam Evans), Ashley Fink (Lauren Zizes) and Darren Criss (Blaine Anderson).

== Concert synopsis ==
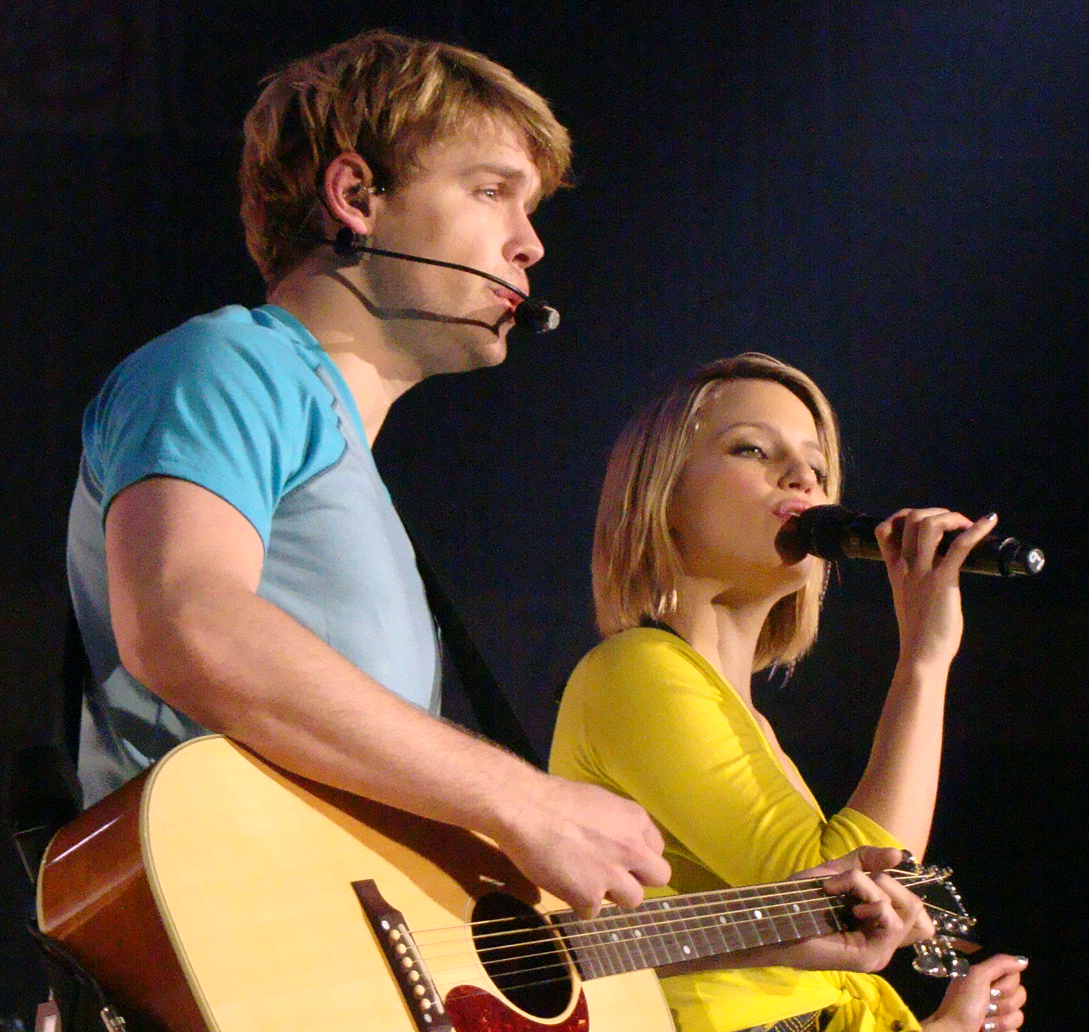
Overstreet and Agron performing "Lucky" on the tour.

=== 2010 ===
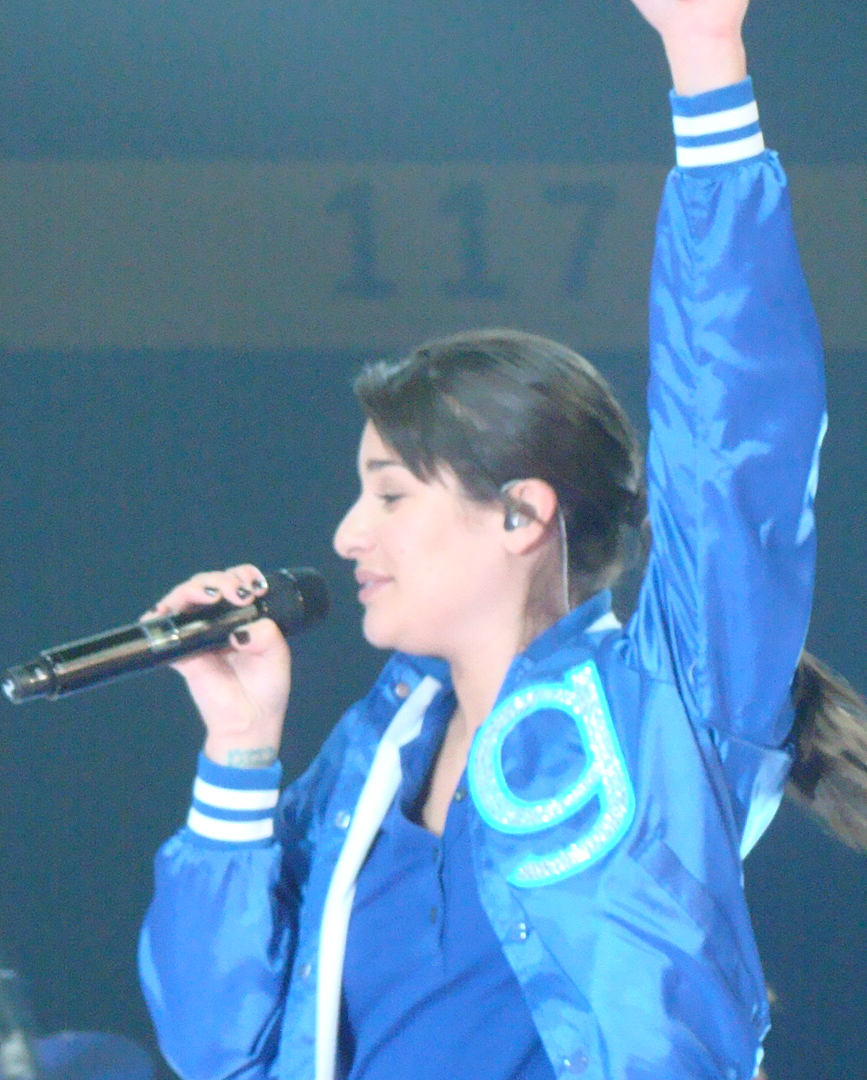
Michele performing "Somebody to Love" on the tour.

The concerts began with a pre-recorded greeting from Jane Lynch as cheerleading coach Sue Sylvester, insulting both audience members and the forthcoming performances. Cast members all performed in character, including able-bodied actor Kevin McHale appearing in a wheelchair as glee club member Artie Abrams who had a disability. As in the show, for the performance of "Jump" the stage was filled with mattresses and the cast wore matching pajamas, while an Escalade was used as a prop for the performance of "Bust Your Windows". Cory Monteith, performing as drum-playing football quarterback Finn Hudson, played the drums as backing for "Sweet Caroline", and several cast members wore Lady Gaga costumes for the performance of "Bad Romance". “Halo/Walking On Sunshine” was also performed with female members of New Directions wearing their iconic yellow dresses. Dancers appeared as rival glee club Vocal Adrenaline, for a masked dance routine of "Rehab" and "Mercy", with no singing involved. The main setlist concluded with a performance of "Like a Prayer", including backing singers dressed in choir robes, while the encore consisted of "True Colors" and "Somebody to Love".

=== 2011 ===
After a 20-minute support set from The Legion of Extraordinary Dancers and the handing out of "Sue's Barf Bags", the main show opened with a pre-recorded video from Sue and Mr. Schuester that introduced the New Directions. The cast members were all in character, and again began their setlist with a performance of "Don't Stop Believin'" with the whole cast on stage. Tina and Mercedes then took the lead vocals in a performance of "Dog Days Are Over", and Rachel and Finn took the leads in "Sing", with the full cast remaining on stage for both songs. There were then smaller group/solo performances, including "Fat Bottomed Girls" by Puck which began with the first venture onto the second stage at the back of the arena with Finn accompanying on the drum-kit, and a lip-synced performance of "I'm a Slave 4 U" from Brittany. The set was preceded by a conversation between the character of Brittany and Mr. Schuester, with the latter performing via a pre-recorded video. This conversation was mostly drowned out by laughter from the crowd.

The whole cast then came back together to perform "Born This Way", including all their original episode T-shirts (a number of which were also made for sale at the merchandising stalls). Rachel then performed "Firework", before a video interlude from Sue introduced the Warblers, who began a three-song set with "Teenage Dream" on the second stage. The setting of the New Directions' choir practice room was then projected onto the stage and the show took on the typical feel of an episode with various characters performing as their accomplices sat/stood around and watched. Brittany appeared on-stage to begin a skit with Blaine and later Kurt, which led into a performance of "Jessie's Girl" by Finn. The last number of the main set was a whole-cast performance of original song "Loser Like Me". After a short interval, Kurt appeared unannounced with Brittany, Tina and a number of other dancers on the second stage and performed a short version of their dance to Beyoncé's "Single Ladies (Put a Ring on It)" as seen in the first season, although the original vocals were kept. Artie then performed "The Safety Dance". The whole cast returned to the main stage for the last two numbers of the night, "Empire State of Mind" and, as was the case in the 2010 tour, "Somebody to Love".

== Critical reception ==
Ed Masley for USA Today described the opening concert as "equal parts musical theater, giddy pop culture phenomenon and Journey-loving rock show". He felt that Riley was the strongest performer, praising her renditions of "Bust Your Windows" and "Beautiful", and preferred the more "wholesome" songs, opining that: "The raps and overt sexuality on Salt-N-Pepa's "Push It" felt a little forced and out of character, especially sandwiched between "My Life Would Suck Without You" and "Don't Rain on My Parade"." Amanda Kwan of The Associated Press was critical of the tour, deeming the debut concert "an evening that only a fan would appreciate" and "a glorified high school talent show". Kwan felt that the setlist was "disjointed", and noted that the cast slipped confusingly in and out of character throughout the concert. Martin Cizmar of the Phoenix New Times deemed the concert over-sanitized, criticizing the decision to change the "Bad Romance" lyric "I'm a free bitch, baby" to "I'm a freak, baby."

Mikael Wood for the Los Angeles Times enjoyed the first Gibson Amphitheatre concert, writing that it "had the triumphant, sometimes self-satisfied feel of a victory lap." MTV's Aimee Curran also gave the concert a positive review, writing: "The cast was able to make every song their own while still managing to maintain the original artist's integrity." Hahn Nguyen of Zap2it wrote: "seeing it live is well worth the money and effort. Not only is there an elevated, infectious energy you don't get from just watching the show at home, but the feeling of togetherness can't be matched." and "One can truly hear the quality of the live vocals, which in the case of Lea Michele is the real deal. She sounds even better than on the show...Her "Don't Rain on My Parade" live is an amazing and thrilling treat." Variety's Andrew Barker gave a less favorable review, writing: "while its distinctive blend of high camp and recognizable tunes may click on the small screen, when translated to stage the conceit becomes little more than a frantic, under-imagined jukeboxer, and only occasionally a well-performed one. Four-city tour will likely rake in the cash and merit a reprise, but whether it deserves it is a different matter." Though he did, again, note Riley's "solid" performances and calling Lea Michele "the most obvious pro" claiming her songs were performed "with power and presence". "Wisely, the producers never left either woman offstage for long.""

== Opening act ==
The opening act for the US leg of tour was the Legion of Extraordinary Dancers (LXD), the dance project of cast member Harry Shum Jr. He described it as being like "worlds colliding", explaining to the New York Post that in the run-up to the tour, he was rehearsing with the cast, then practicing with LXD until midnight, working closely with the group's choreographer Christopher Scott. He commented: "I think [Glee and LXD] go hand-in-hand in terms of creating art. That's what's so great about them choosing LXD. They could have had an opening band but I think it's going to be a much different show having elements of LXD in it."

== Setlist ==
2010
1. "Don't Stop Believin'" – Full cast: Lea Michele and Cory Monteith soloists
2. "My Life Would Suck Without You" – Full cast: Lea Michele and Cory Monteith soloists
3. "Push It" – Full cast: Lea Michele, Cory Monteith, and Kevin McHale soloists
4. "Don't Rain on My Parade" – Lea Michele
5. "Beautiful" – Amber Riley
6. "Sweet Caroline" – Mark Salling
7. "The Boy Is Mine" – Amber Riley and Naya Rivera
8. "The Lady Is a Tramp" – Mark Salling, Amber Riley, and Naya Rivera
9. "Defying Gravity" – Chris Colfer and Lea Michele
10. "Bust Your Windows" – Amber Riley, Heather Morris – dancing
11. "Bad Romance" – Jenna Ushkowitz, Chris Colfer, Lea Michele, Dianna Agron, Harry Shum Jr., Heather Morris, and Naya Rivera
12. "Dancing with Myself" – Kevin McHale
13. "It's My Life" / "Confessions Part II" – Kevin McHale and Cory Monteith
14. "Halo" / "Walking on Sunshine" – Lea Michele, Jenna Ushkowitz, Amber Riley, Dianna Agron, Naya Rivera, Heather Morris
15. "Rehab" – Vocal Adrenaline
16. "Mercy" – Vocal Adrenaline
17. "Jump" – Full cast: Lea Michele, Cory Monteith, and Amber Riley soloists
18. "Faithfully" – Lea Michele and Cory Monteith
19. "Any Way You Want It" / "Lovin', Touchin', Squeezin'" – Full cast: Lea Michele and Cory Monteith soloists
20. "Like a Prayer" – Full cast: Lea Michele, Cory Monteith, Chris Colfer, and Amber Riley soloists

Encore

21. "True Colors" – Full cast: Jenna Ushkowitz soloist
22. "Somebody to Love" – Full cast: Lea Michele, Cory Monteith, and Amber Riley soloists

Notes

- "Hello", performed by Lea Michele and Jonathan Groff, was included in performances at the Gibson Amphitheatre (Los Angeles, California), and Radio City Music Hall (New York City, New York).
- "Over the Rainbow", performed by Matthew Morrison along with Mark Salling, was included in the performance at the Radio City Music Hall (New York City, New York).
2011
1. "Don't Stop Believin'" – Full cast: Lea Michele and Cory Monteith soloists
2. "Dog Days Are Over" – Full cast: Jenna Ushkowitz and Amber Riley soloists
3. "Sing" – Full cast: Lea Michele and Cory Monteith soloists
4. "I'm a Slave 4 U" – Heather Morris
5. "Fat Bottomed Girls" – Mark Salling
6. "I Want to Hold Your Hand" – Chris Colfer
7. "Ain't No Way" – Amber Riley
8. "P.Y.T. (Pretty Young Thing)" – Harry Shum Jr., Kevin McHale
9. "Born This Way" – Full cast: Chris Colfer, Jenna Ushkowitz, and Amber Riley soloists
10. "Firework" – Lea Michele
11. "Teenage Dream" – The Warblers
12. "Silly Love Songs" – The Warblers
13. "Raise Your Glass" – The Warblers
14. "Happy Days Are Here Again / Get Happy" – Lea Michele and Chris Colfer
15. "Lucky" – Dianna Agron and Chord Overstreet (Not performed on June 13, June 29 and July 2 due to Dianna Agron's absence.)
16. "River Deep – Mountain High" – Amber Riley and Naya Rivera (Performed solo by Amber Riley on June 30 due to Naya Rivera's absence.)
17. "Don't Rain on My Parade" – Lea Michele (May 21–28 and June 16–18 only)
18. "Jessie's Girl" – Cory Monteith
19. "Valerie" – Naya Rivera (Not performed on June 30 due to Naya Rivera's absence)
20. "Loser like Me" – Full cast: Lea Michele and Cory Monteith soloists

Encore

21. "Single Ladies (Put a Ring on It)" – Chris Colfer, Jenna Ushkowitz, and Heather Morris
22. "Friday" – Chord Overstreet, Mark Salling, Kevin McHale, Darren Criss, and Harry Shum, Jr. (Removed after June 12)
23. "The Safety Dance" – Kevin McHale
24. "Empire State of Mind" – Full cast: Kevin McHale, Cory Monteith, Mark Salling, and Amber Riley soloists
25. "Somebody to Love" – Full cast: Lea Michele, Cory Monteith, and Amber Riley soloists

Notes

- "Forget You", performed by Gwyneth Paltrow and the full cast (excluding Darren Criss and Lea Michele; Amber Riley, Kevin McHale and Naya Rivera soloists), was included in the 6/16/2011 & 6/17/2011 performances at the Izod Center (East Rutherford, New Jersey) It was also performed in London on June 29th.
- "True Colors", performed by Jenna Ushkowitz on the last London performance on June 30, in Dublin on July 2 and on July 3 for the last show.

== Shows ==
List of concerts, showing date, city, country, venue, opening act, tickets sold, number of available tickets and amount of gross revenue
Date	City	Country	Venue	Opening act	Attendance	Revenue
Leg 1 — North America
May 15, 2010	Phoenix	United States	Dodge Theatre	—N/a	9,539 / 9,539	$595,938
May 16, 2010	Phoenix	United States	Dodge Theatre	—N/a	9,539 / 9,539	$595,938
May 20, 2010	Los Angeles	United States	Gibson Amphitheatre	—N/a	23,720 / 23,720	$1,649,743
May 21, 2010	Los Angeles	United States	Gibson Amphitheatre	—N/a	23,720 / 23,720	$1,649,743
May 22, 2010	Los Angeles	United States	Gibson Amphitheatre	—N/a	23,720 / 23,720	$1,649,743
May 25, 2010	Rosemont	United States	Rosemont Theatre	—N/a	8,895 / 8,895	$624,453
May 26, 2010	Rosemont	United States	Rosemont Theatre	—N/a	8,895 / 8,895	$624,453
May 28, 2010	New York City	United States	Radio City Music Hall	—N/a	29,739 / 29,739	$2,161,304
May 29, 2010	New York City	United States	Radio City Music Hall	—N/a	29,739 / 29,739	$2,161,304
May 30, 2010	New York City	United States	Radio City Music Hall	—N/a	29,739 / 29,739	$2,161,304
Leg 2 — North America
May 21, 2011	Las Vegas	United States	Mandalay Bay Events Center	The LXD	8,210 / 8,210	$879,880
May 23, 2011	Sacramento	United States	Power Balance Pavilion	The LXD	10,224 / 10,224	$783,520
May 24, 2011	San Jose	United States	HP Pavilion	The LXD	23,086 / 23,086	$1,858,140
May 25, 2011	San Jose	United States	HP Pavilion	The LXD	23,086 / 23,086	$1,858,140
May 27, 2011	Anaheim	United States	Honda Center	The LXD	11,643 / 11,643	$801,591
May 28, 2011	Los Angeles	United States	Staples Center	—N/a	25,420 / 26,725	$1,721,168
May 29, 2011	San Diego	United States	Valley View Casino Center	The LXD	9,449 / 9,449	$737,801
June 1, 2011	Minneapolis	United States	Target Center	The LXD	12,209 / 12,209	$988,346
June 2, 2011	Indianapolis	United States	Conseco Fieldhouse	The LXD	11,449 / 11,449	$882,744
June 3, 2011	Rosemont	United States	Allstate Arena	The LXD	33,204 / 33,204	$2,708,378
June 4, 2011	Rosemont	United States	Allstate Arena	The LXD	33,204 / 33,204	$2,708,378
June 6, 2011	Uncasville	United States	Mohegan Sun Arena	The LXD	4,461 / 4,461	$555,475
June 7, 2011	Boston	United States	TD Garden	The LXD	12,735 / 12,735	$1,075,343
June 8, 2011	Philadelphia	United States	Wells Fargo Center	The LXD	14,649 / 14,649	$1,274,073
June 9, 2011	Washington, D.C.	United States	Verizon Center	The LXD	13,462 / 13,462	$1,182,755
June 11, 2011	Toronto	Canada	Air Canada Centre	The LXD	54,462 / 54,462	$4,452,129
June 12, 2011	Toronto	Canada	Air Canada Centre	The LXD	54,462 / 54,462	$4,452,129
June 13, 2011	Auburn Hills	United States	The Palace of Auburn Hills	—N/a	13,801 / 13,801	$1,052,618
June 14, 2011	Cleveland	United States	Quicken Loans Arena	The LXD	12,779 / 12,779	$1,029,611
June 16, 2011	East Rutherford	United States	Izod Center	The LXD	28,694 / 28,694	$2,401,433
June 17, 2011	East Rutherford	United States	Izod Center	The LXD	28,694 / 28,694	$2,401,433
June 18, 2011	Uniondale	United States	Nassau Veterans Memorial Coliseum	The LXD	24,669 / 24,669	$2,043,832
Leg 3 — British Isles
June 22, 2011	Manchester	England	Manchester Evening News Arena	The LXD	28,895 / 28,895	$2,363,373
June 23, 2011	Manchester	England	Manchester Evening News Arena	The LXD	28,895 / 28,895	$2,363,373
June 25, 2011	London	England	The O_{2} Arena	The LXD	103,513 / 103,513	$8,488,444
June 26, 2011	London	England	The O_{2} Arena	The LXD	103,513 / 103,513	$8,488,444
June 28, 2011	London	England	The O_{2} Arena	The LXD	103,513 / 103,513	$8,488,444
June 29, 2011	London	England	The O_{2} Arena	The LXD	103,513 / 103,513	$8,488,444
June 30, 2011	London	England	The O_{2} Arena	The LXD	103,513 / 103,513	$8,488,444
July 2, 2011	Dublin	Ireland	O_{2} Dublin	The LXD	33,412 / 33,412	$3,576,663
July 3, 2011	Dublin	Ireland	O_{2} Dublin	The LXD	33,412 / 33,412	$3,576,663
Total					562,319 / 563,624	$45,888,755

== Performers ==
Cast members perform in character as their Glee counterparts.

Performers (2010)

- Dianna Agron as Quinn Fabray
- Chris Colfer as Kurt Hummel
- Kevin McHale as Artie Abrams
- Lea Michele as Rachel Berry
- Cory Monteith as Finn Hudson
- Heather Morris as Brittany Pierce
- Amber Riley as Mercedes Jones
- Naya Rivera as Santana Lopez
- Mark Salling as Noah "Puck" Puckerman
- Harry Shum, Jr. as Mike Chang
- Dijon Talton as Matt Rutherford
- Jenna Ushkowitz as Tina Cohen-Chang

Performers (2011)

- Dianna Agron as Quinn Fabray
- Chris Colfer as Kurt Hummel
- Darren Criss as Blaine Anderson
- Ashley Fink as Lauren Zizes
- Kevin McHale as Artie Abrams
- Lea Michele as Rachel Berry
- Cory Monteith as Finn Hudson
- Heather Morris as Brittany Pierce
- Chord Overstreet as Sam Evans
- Amber Riley as Mercedes Jones
- Naya Rivera as Santana Lopez
- Mark Salling as Noah "Puck" Puckerman
- Harry Shum, Jr. as Mike Chang
- Jenna Ushkowitz as Tina Cohen-Chang

== Broadcasts and recordings ==
20th Century Fox released the movie of Glee Live! In Concert!, entitled Glee: The 3D Concert Movie, in theaters on August 12 for a two-week limited engagement; it was directed by Kevin Tancharoen. The film was shot during the concerts on June 16 and 17, 2011, in East Rutherford, New Jersey. The 3D concert film features the entire concert with Behind the Scenes footage, with special guest Gwyneth Paltrow as Holly Holliday. The DVD and Blu-ray of the film, including a 3D Blu-ray, were released around the world in December 2011, and featured exclusive performances which were cut from the film and introductions by Jane Lynch as Sue Sylvester.
