= 2nd Streamy Awards =

2010 awards ceremony recognizing online video

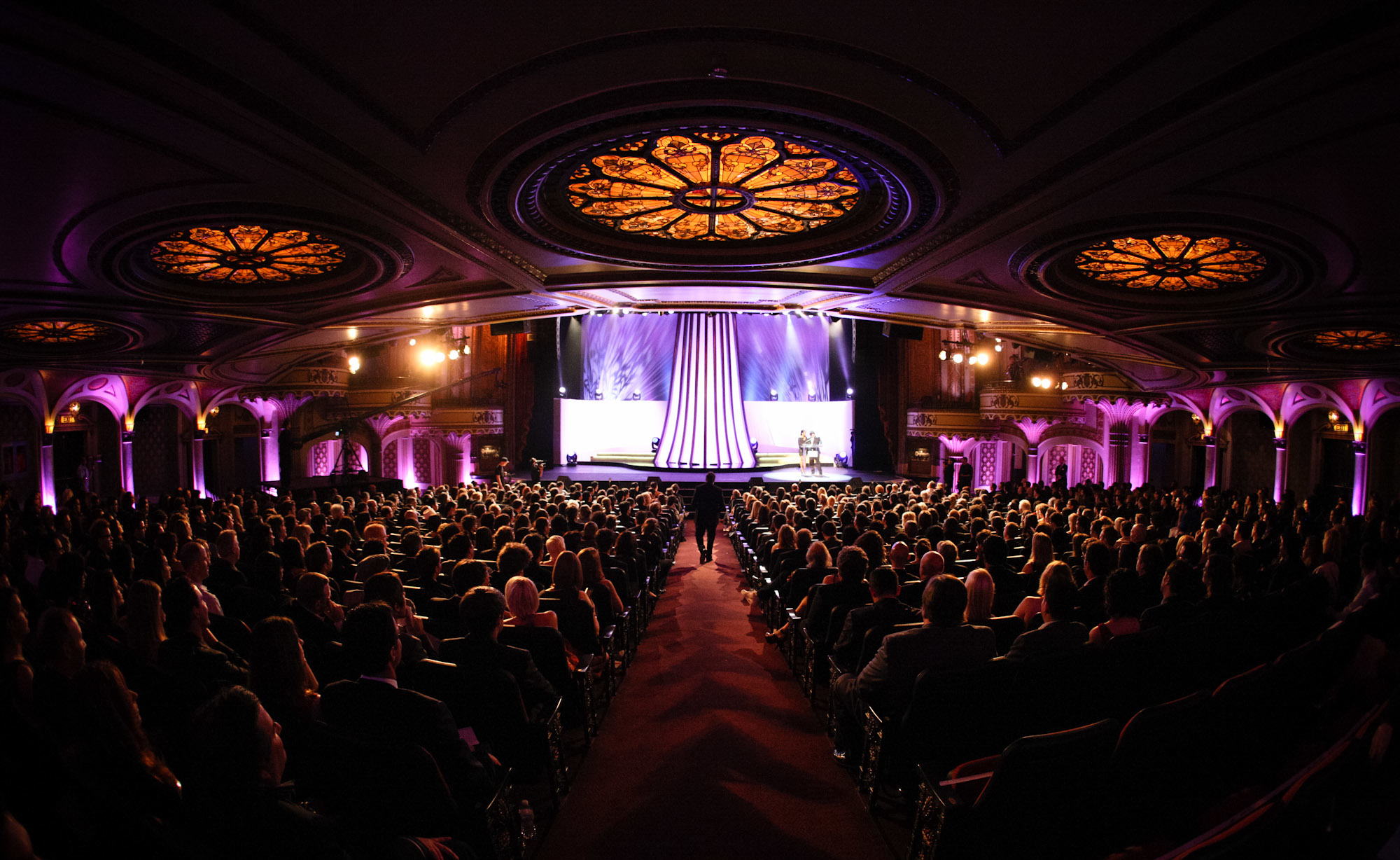
- The awards were held at the Orpheum Theatre, Los Angeles
- Date: April 11, 2010
- Location: Orpheum Theatre; Los Angeles, California
- Presented by: International Academy of Web Television
- Hosted by: Paul Scheer

Highlights
- Most awards: The Bannen Way (4)
- Most nominations: The Guild (8)
- Audience Choice: Agents of Cracked (Best Web Series)

Television/radio coverage
- Network: YouTube
- Runtime: >3 hours

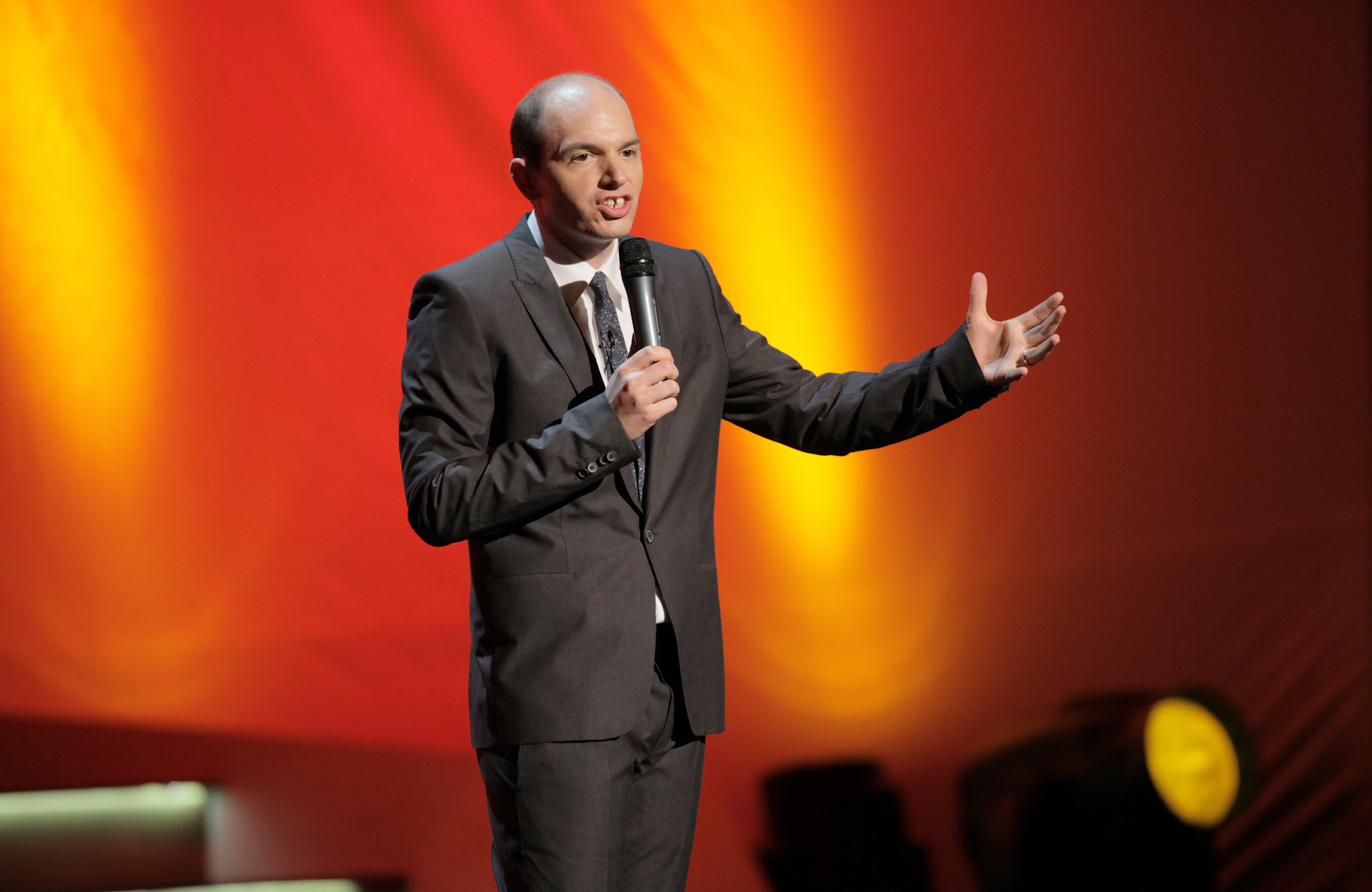
Paul Scheer hosting the show

The 2nd Annual Streamy Awards, presented by the International Academy of Web Television, was the second installment of the Streamy Awards honoring streaming television series. The awards were held on Sunday, April 11, 2010, at the Orpheum Theatre in Los Angeles, California. Paul Scheer served as the host of the presentation. Over 1,300 audience members were in attendance and the show was broadcast live online.

The show was met with technical difficulties and other disruptions throughout the ceremony and was criticized for its humour which was viewed as unfunny, crude, and deprecatory of internet culture. Controversy surrounding the reception of the event led to the International Academy of Web Television splitting from the show to create its own separate awards show, the IAWTV Awards, and a two-year hiatus of the Streamys.

== Winners and nominees ==
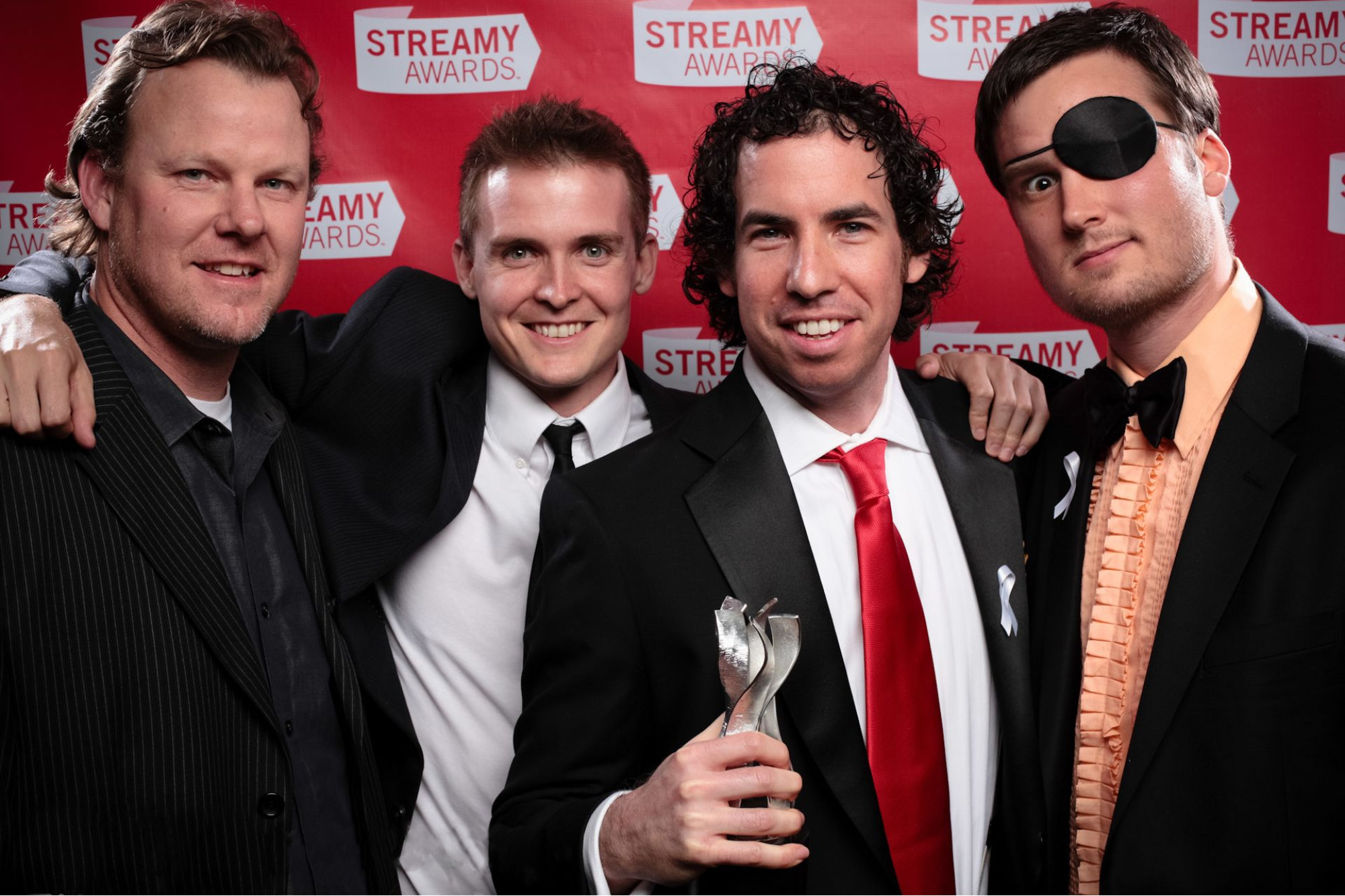
Agents of Cracked, winner of Audience Choice Award for Best Web Series

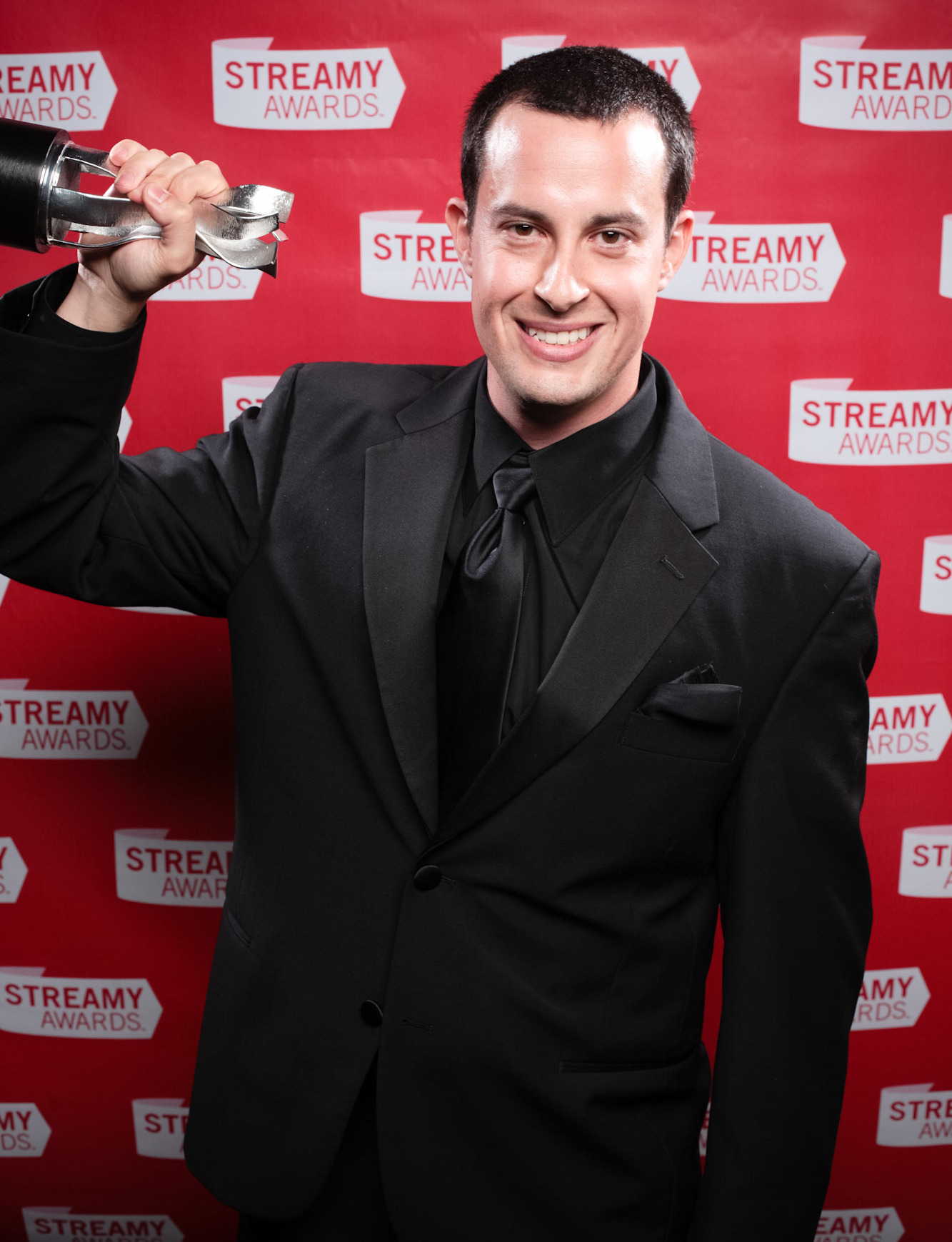
Sean Becker, winner of Best Directing for a Comedy Web Series

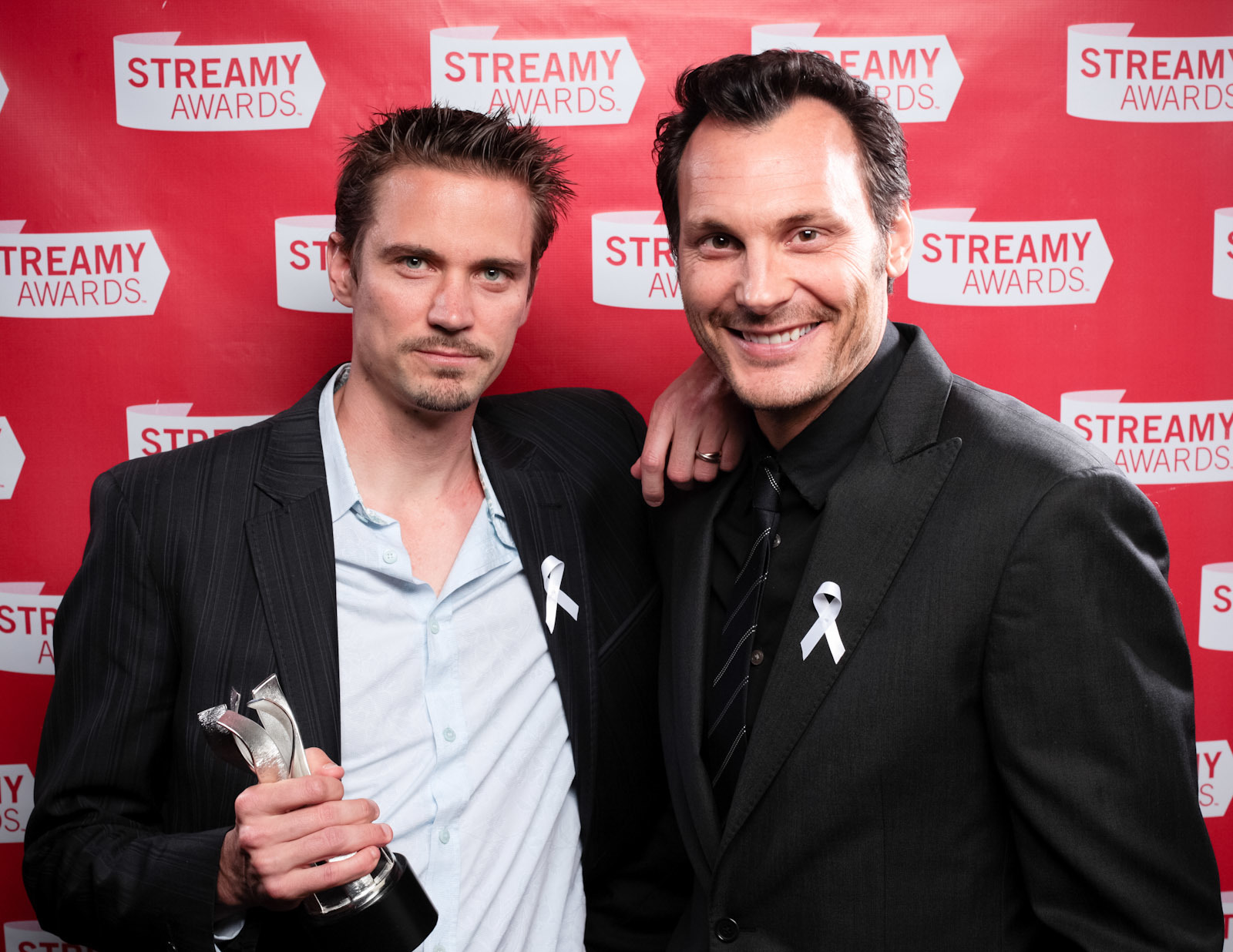
Jesse Warren, winner of Best Directing for a Dramatic Web Series, and Mark Gantt, winner of Best Male Actor in a Dramatic Web Series

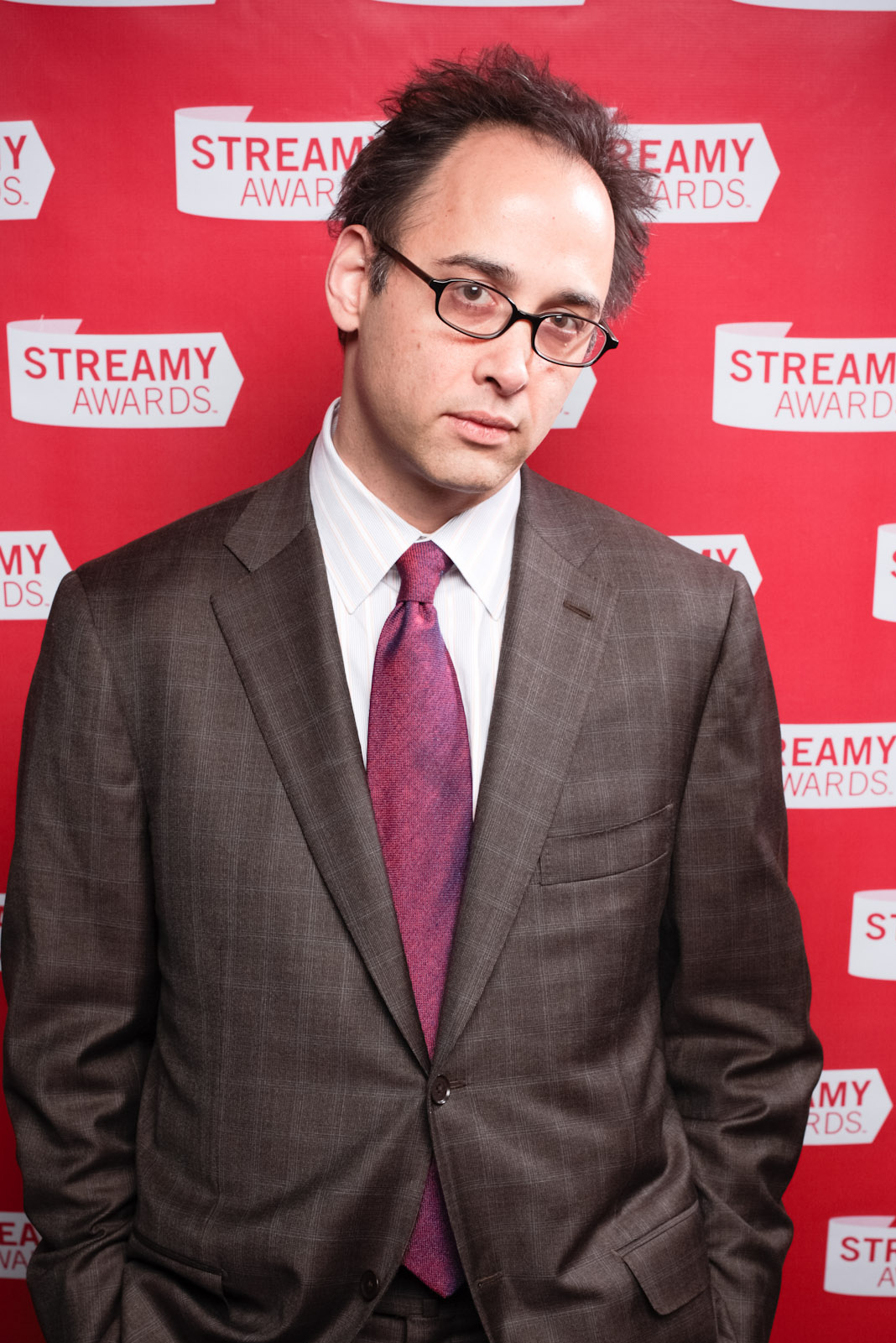
David Wain, winner of Best Writing for a Comedy Web Series

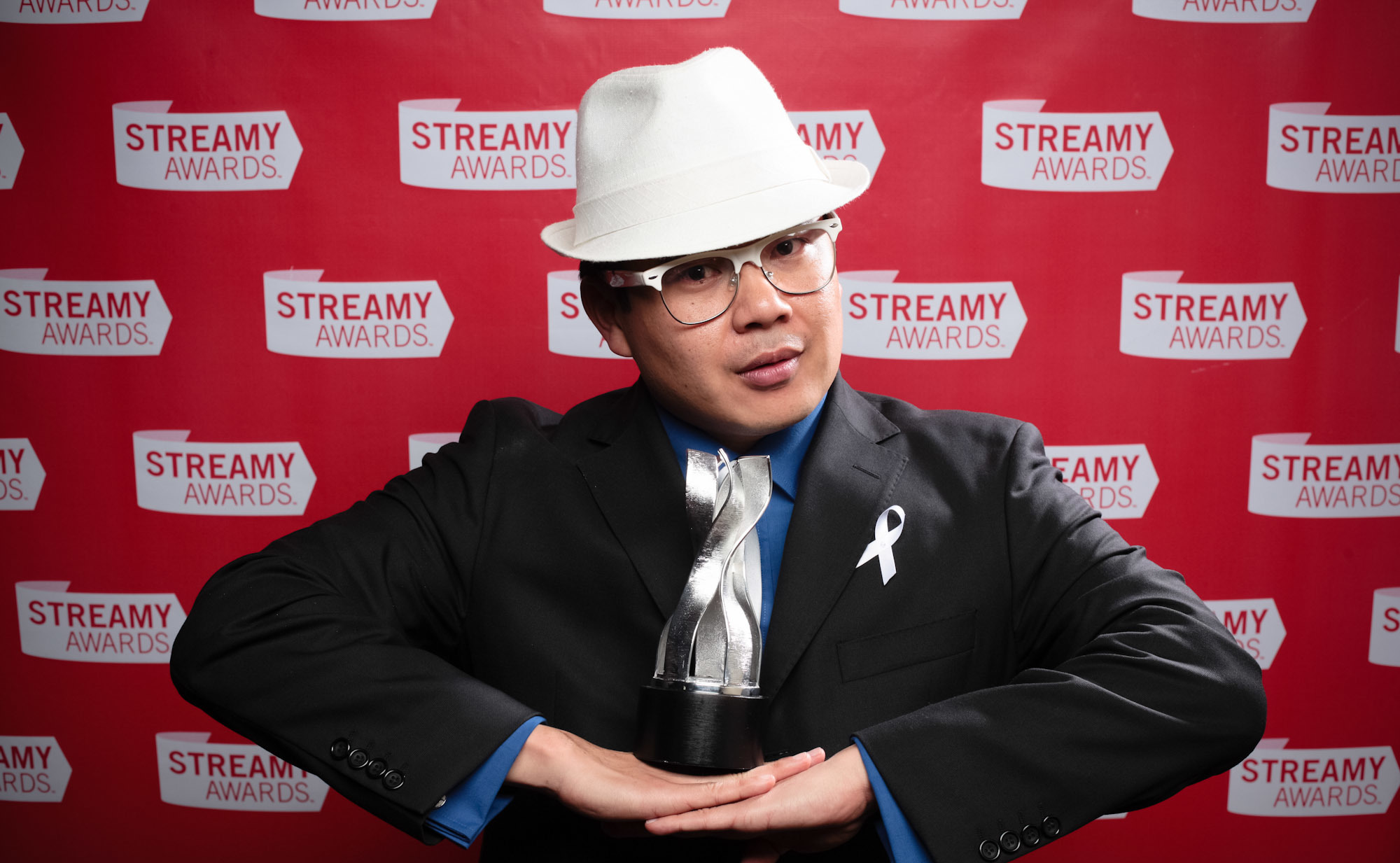
Bernie Su, winner of Best Writing for a Dramatic Web Series

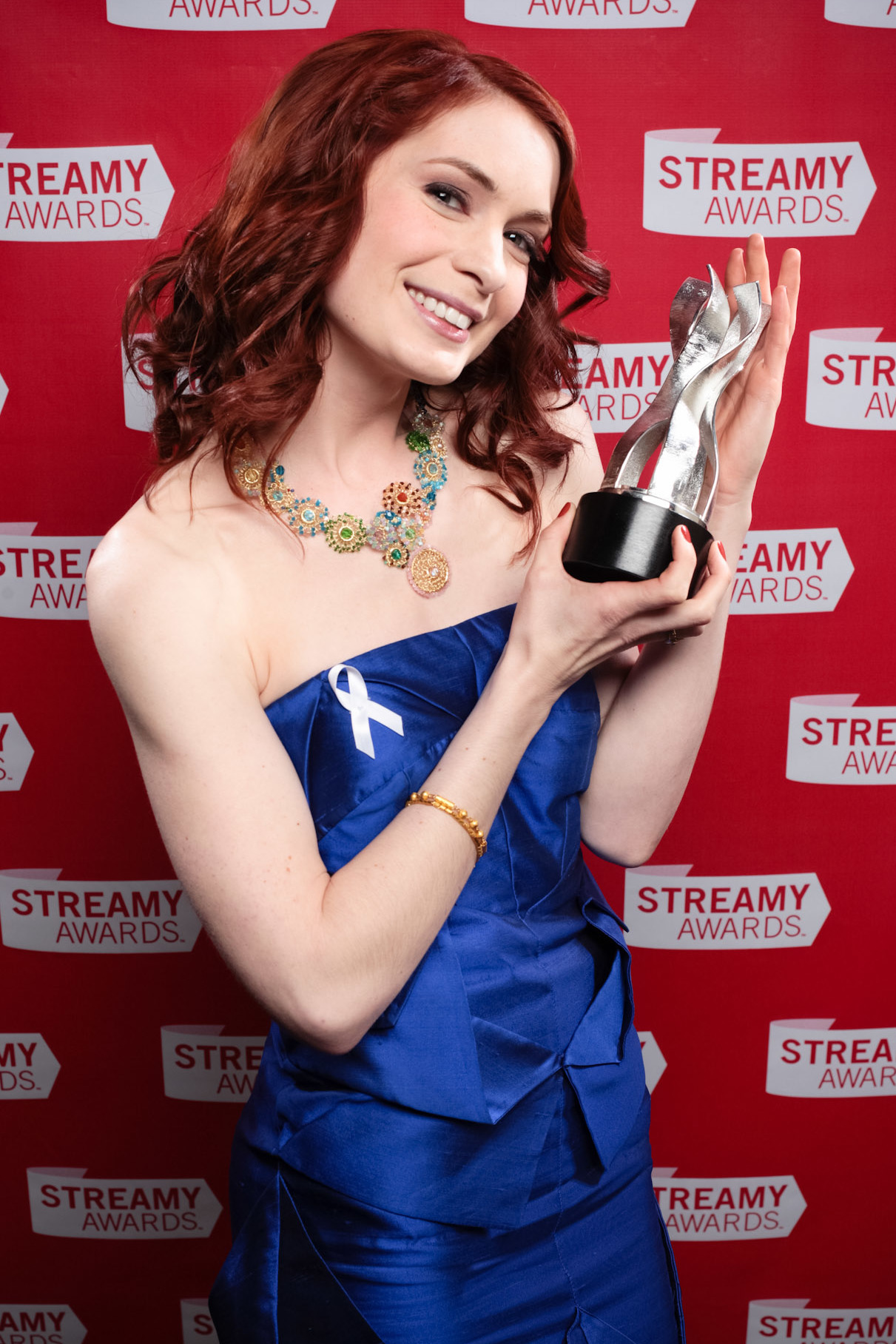
Felicia Day, winner of Best Female Actor in a Comedy Web Series

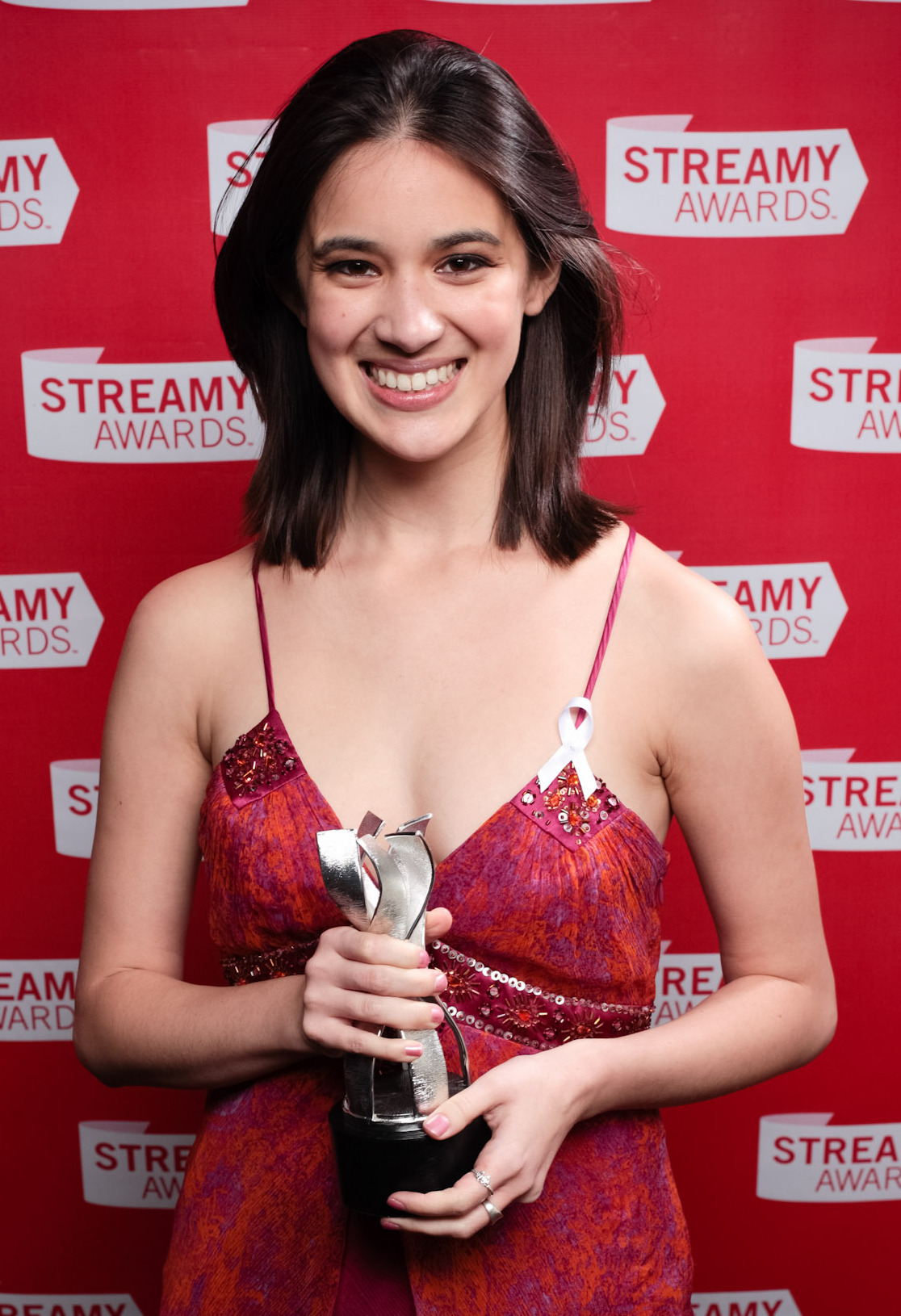
Rachael Hip-Flores, winner of Best Female Actor in a Dramatic Web Series

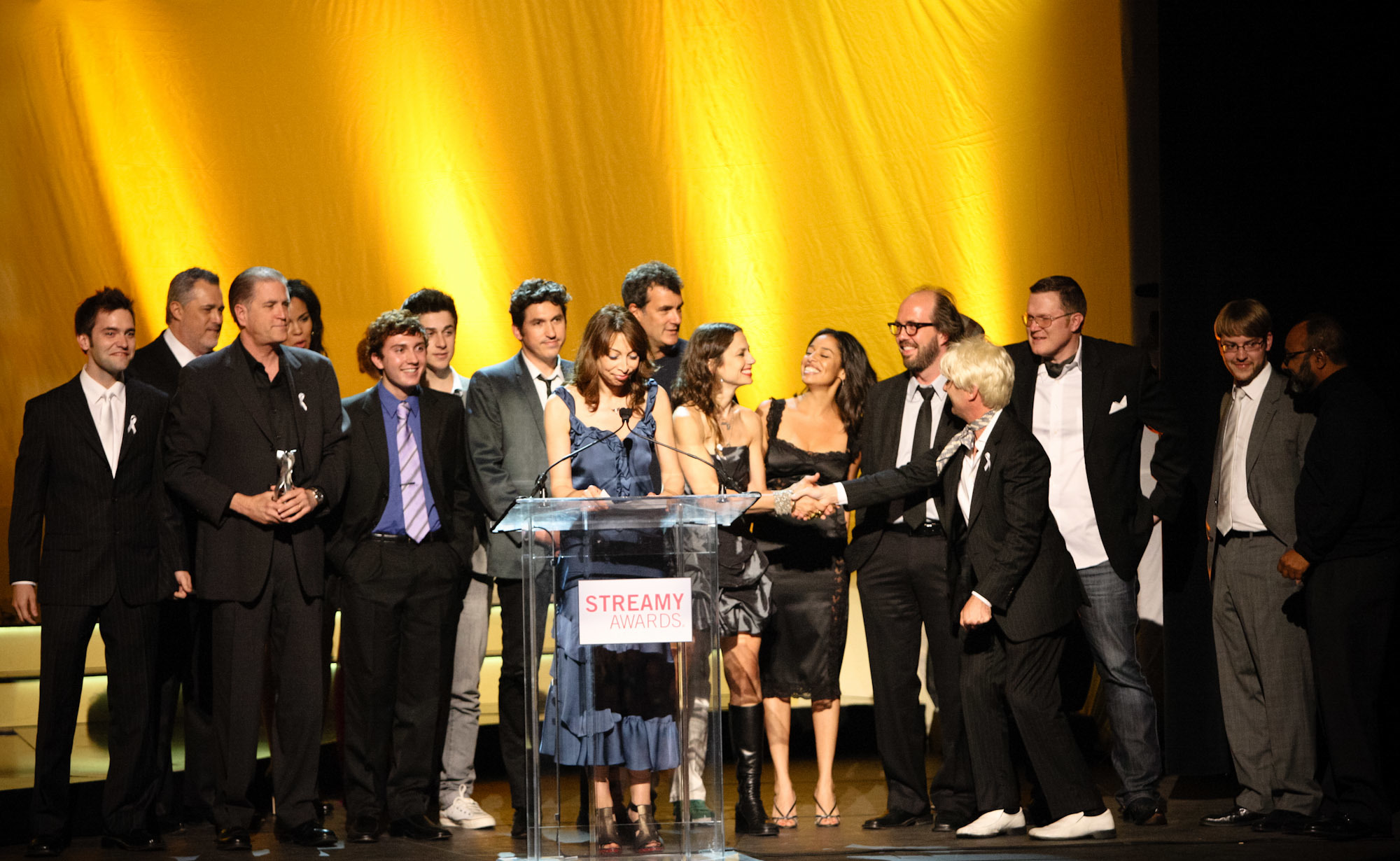
Easy to Assemble won Best Ensemble Cast in a Web Series and Best Product Integration in a Web Series

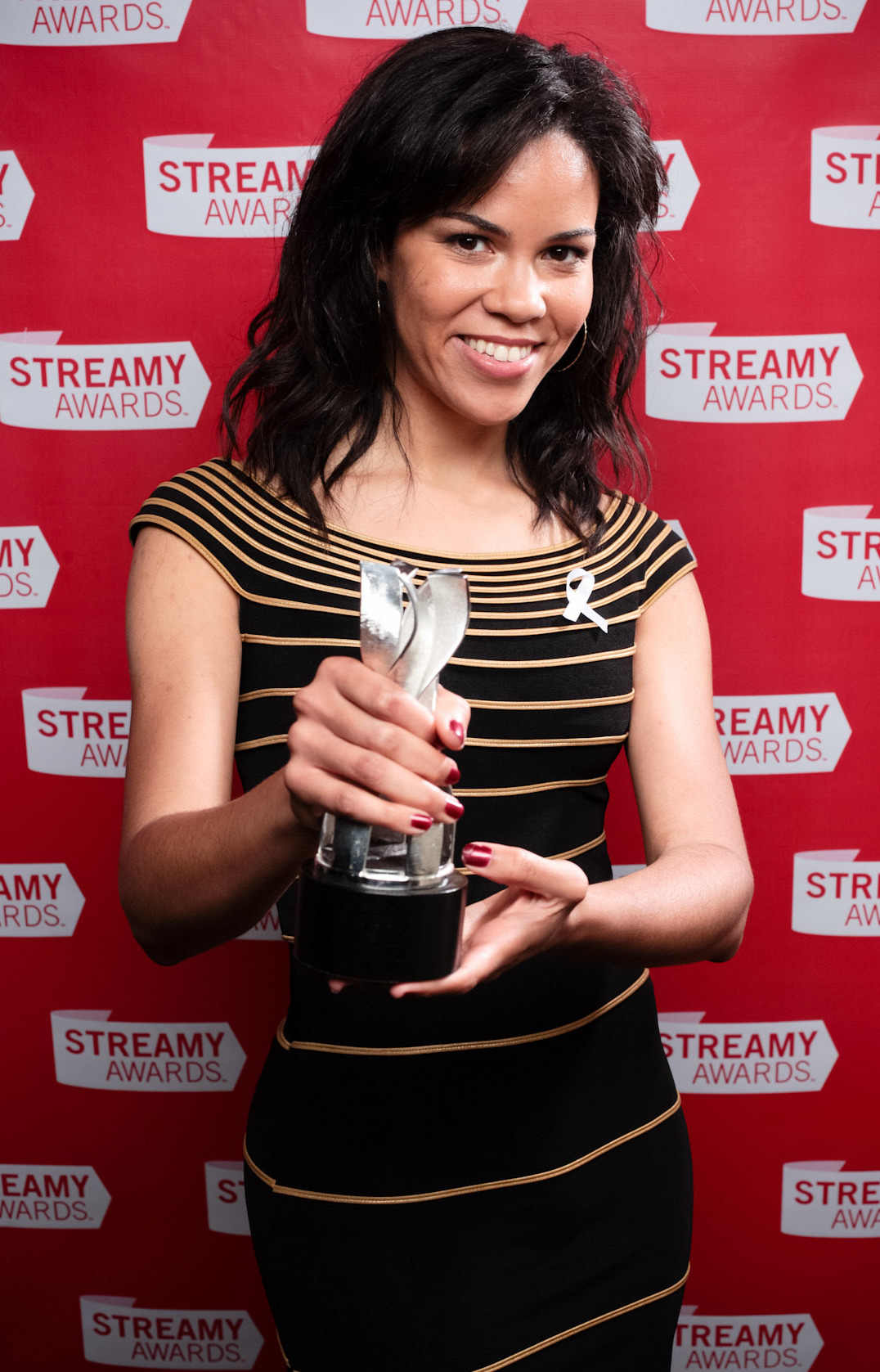
Zadi Diaz, winner of Best Web Series Host

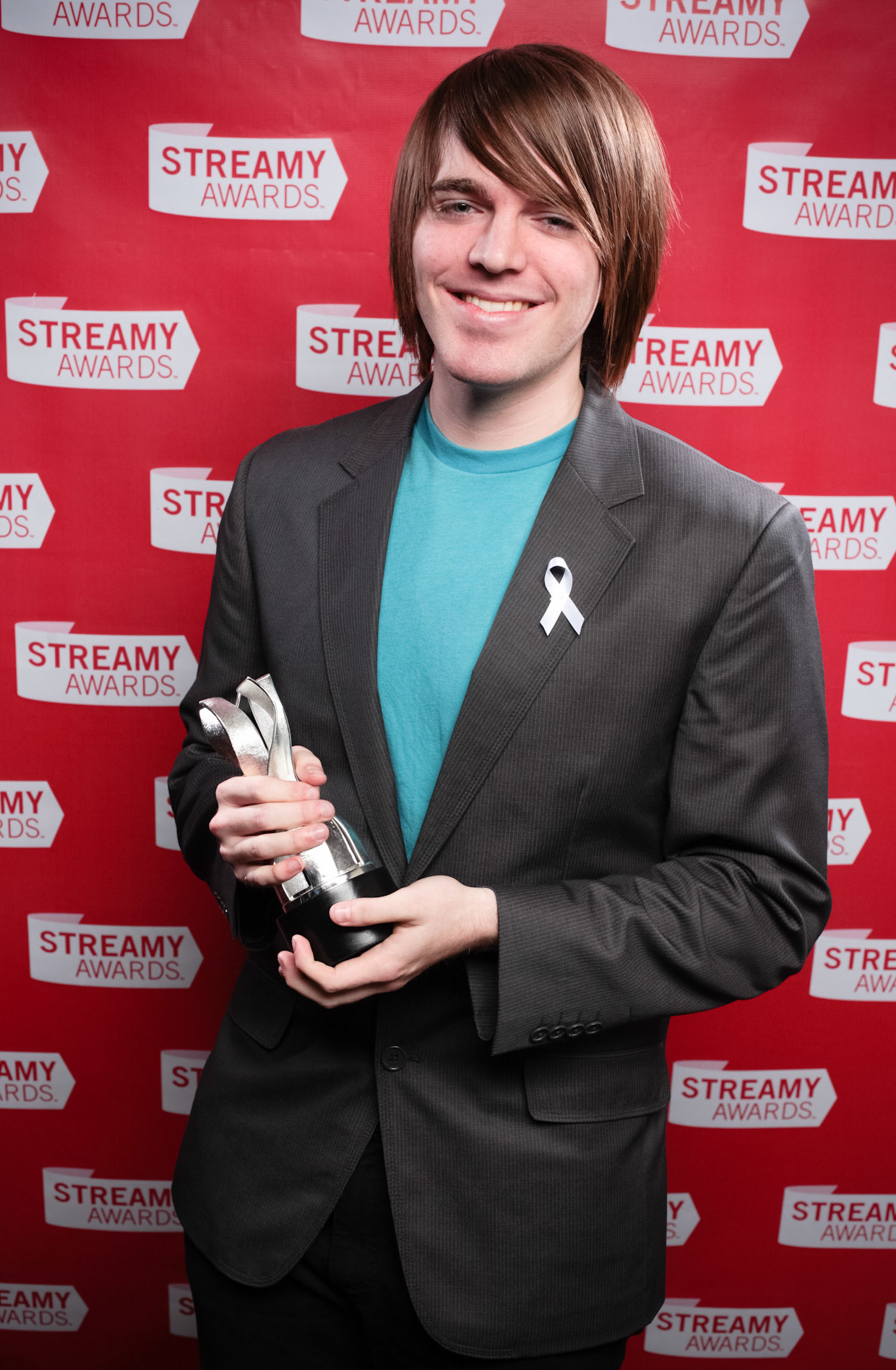
Shane Dawson, winner of Best Vlogger

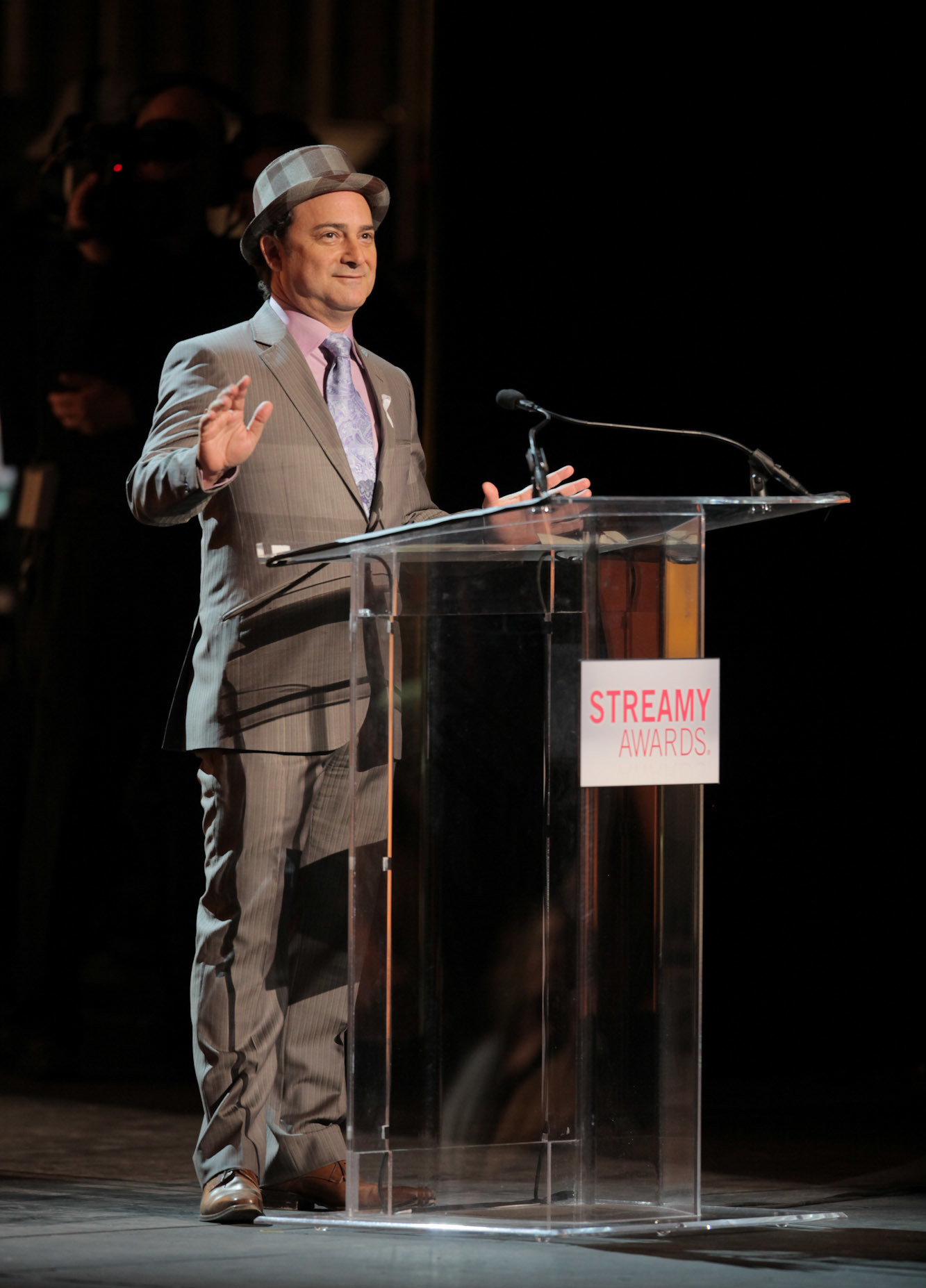
Kevin Pollak, winner of Best Live Production in a Web Series for Kevin Pollak's Chat Show

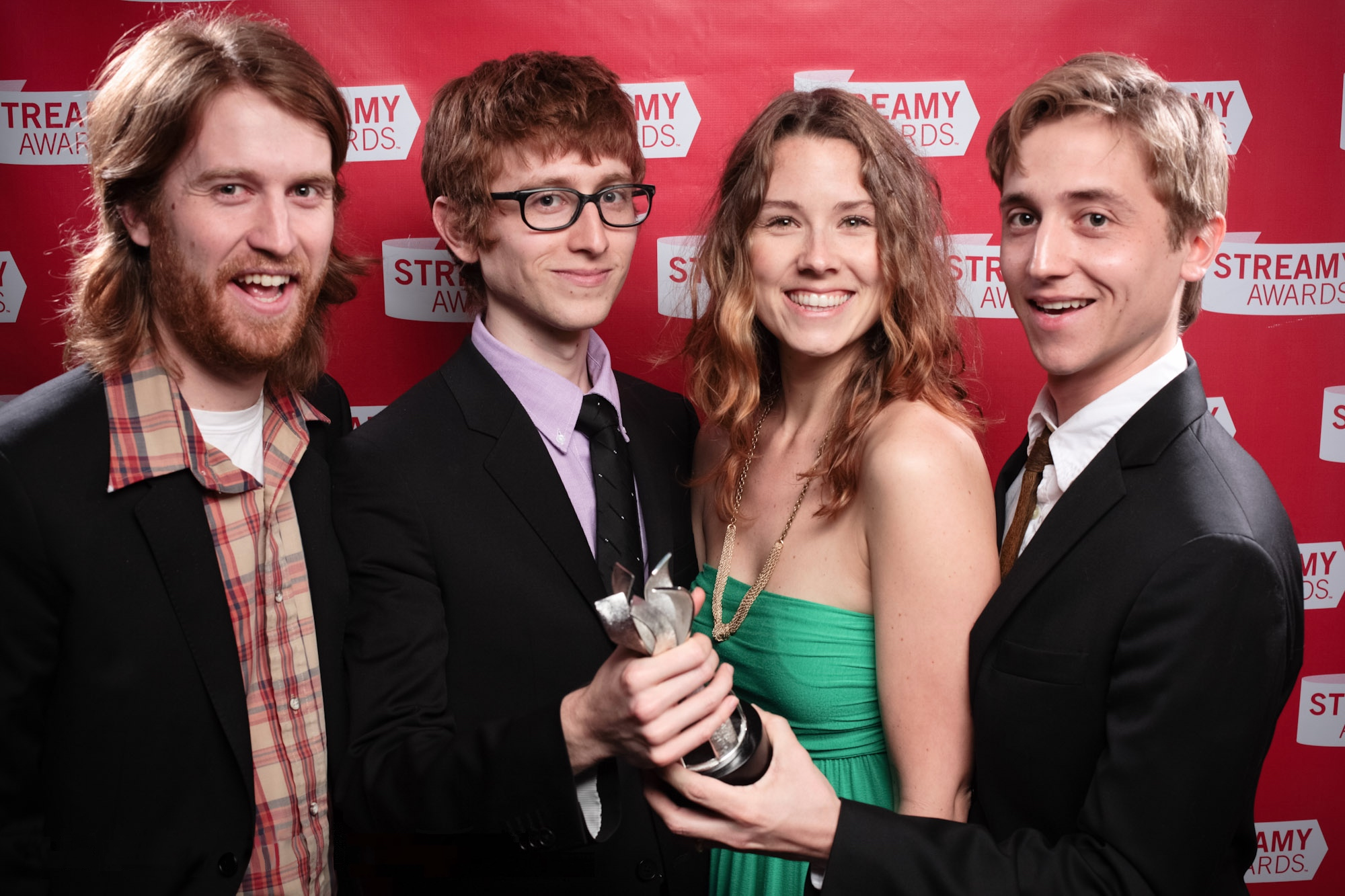
The Gregory Brothers, winners of Best Original Music, Best News or Politics Web Series, and Best Experimental Web Series

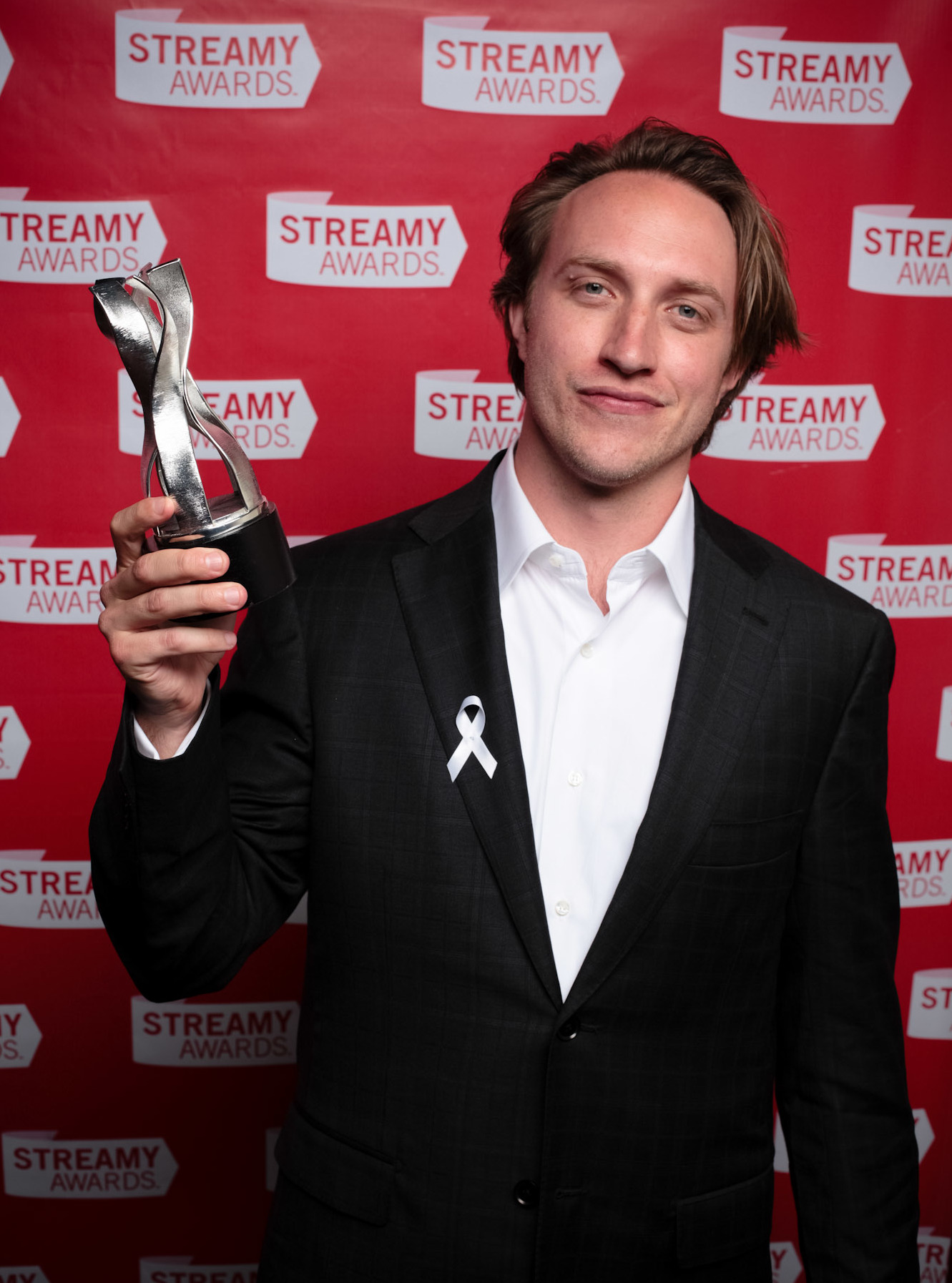
Chad Hurley, the co-founder of YouTube, was the Streamy Visionary Award Honoree

The nominees were announced on March 1, 2010, and the finalists for the Audience Choice Award for Best Web Series were announced on March 29. The Streamy Craft Award winners were announced in a ceremony hosted by Jim Festante at the Barnsdall Gallery Theater on April 7. The remaining awards were announced in the main ceremony at the Orpheum Theatre on April 11. Winners of the categories were selected by the International Academy of Web Television except for the Audience Choice Award for Best Web Series which was put to a public vote.

Winners are listed first, in bold.

OVERALL
Best Comedy Web Series	Best Dramatic Web Series
**Between Two Ferns with Zach Galifianakis**; The Guild; Easy to Assemble; The Legend of Neil; Wainy Days	**The Bannen Way**; Angel of Death; Compulsions; OzGirl; Valemont
Best Hosted Web Series	Best Reality or Documentary Web Series
**Diggnation**; A Comicbook Orange; EPIC FU; Kevin Pollak's Chat Show; The Totally Rad Show	**The Secret Life of Scientists**; Interview Project; Mommy XXX; RADAR; Streak to Win
Best News or Politics Web Series	Best Foreign Web Series
**Auto-Tune the News**; Rocketboom; The Tomorrow Show with Rocca; The Young Turks; VBS News	**OzGirl**; Flying Kebab; Girl Number 9; Noob; Riese
Best New Web Series	Best Companion Web Series
**Odd Jobs**; $5 Cover: Memphis; Girl Number 9; Old Friends; The Bannen Way	**The Office: Subtle Sexuality**; Assassin's Creed: Lineage; Dexter: Early Cuts; Harper's Globe; Weeds: University of Andy
Best Animated Web Series	Best Branded Entertainment Web Series
**How It Should Have Ended**; Eli's Dirty Jokes; Happy Tree Friends; Homestar Runner; Zero Punctuation	**Back on Topps (Topps, Dick's Sporting Goods)**; Brainstorm (Altoids); Easy to Assemble (IKEA); Parts Art (Lexus); The Temp Life (Spherion)
Best Experimental Web Series	Audience Choice Award for Best Web Series
**Auto-Tune the News**; Green Porno; HBO Cube; INST MSGS; Level 26	**Agents of Cracked**; Anyone But Me; Dorm Life; Elevator; Noob; Star-ving; The Guild; The Legend of Neil; The Totally Rad Show; The Young Turks
DIRECTING
Best Directing for a Comedy Web Series	Best Directing for a Dramatic Web Series
**Sean Becker for directing The Guild**; Chris Smith and Mark Stewart Iverson for directing Dorm Life; Scott Brown for directing Blue Movies; James Gunn for directing PG Porn; Sandeep Parikh for directing The Legend of Neil	**Jesse Warren for directing The Bannen Way**; Tina Cesa Ward for directing Anyone But Me; Nathan Atkinson for directing Compulsions; James Moran and Dan Turner for directing Girl Number 9; Joe Swanberg for directing Young American Bodies
WRITING
Best Writing for a Comedy Web Series	Best Writing for a Dramatic Web Series
**David Wain for writing Wainy Days**; Jason Sklar, Randy Sklar, Eric Friedman, and Matt Price for writing Back on Topps; Chris Smith, Jordan Riggs, Jessie Gaskell, Jack De Sena, Jim Brandon, Brian Singleton and Mark Stewart Iverson for writing Dorm Life; Felicia Day for writing The Guild; Tony Janning and Sandeep Parikh for writing The Legend of Neil	**Bernie Su for writing Compulsions**; Susan Miller and Tina Cesa Ward for writing Anyone But Me; James Moran for writing Girl Number 9; Mark Gantt and Jesse Warren for writing The Bannen Way; Christian Taylor for writing Valemont
PERFORMANCE
Best Male Actor in a Comedy Web Series	Best Female Actor in a Comedy Web Series
**Zach Galifianakis – (Between Two Ferns with Zach Galifianakis)**; Tony Hale – (CTRL); Amir Blumenfeld – (Jake and Amir); David Wain – (Wainy Days); Sandeep Parikh – (The Guild)	**Felicia Day – (The Guild)**; Lisa Kudrow – (Web Therapy); Illeana Douglas – (Easy to Assemble); Justine Bateman – (Easy to Assemble); Joanna Cassidy – (Sex Ed)
Best Male Actor in a Dramatic Web Series	Best Female Actor in a Dramatic Web Series
**Mark Gantt – (The Bannen Way)**; Craig Frank – (Compulsions); Robert Englund – (Fear Clinic); Joe Absolom – (Girl Number 9); Eric Balfour – (Valemont)	**Rachael Hip-Flores – (Anyone But Me)**; Zoë Bell – (Angel of Death); Tatyana Ali – (Buppies); Sophie Tilson – (OzGirl); Crystal Chappell – (Venice)
Best Ensemble Cast in a Web Series	Best Guest Star in a Web Series
**Easy to Assemble (Illeana Douglas, Justine Bateman, Eric Lange, Michael Irpino, Cheri Oteri, Daryl Sabara, Michael Panes, Rob Mailhouse, Sean Durrie, Tom Arnold, Ed Begley Jr., Tim Meadows, Ricki Lake, Greg Proops, Kevin Pollak)**; Back on Topps (Randy Sklar, Jason Sklar, Jason Nash, Janet Varney, Stephanie Courtney, Brian Huskey, Phil LaMarr); Dorm Life (Nora Kirkpatrick, Hannah Pearl Utt, Anne Lane, Jessie Gaskell, Brian Singleton, Jack De Sena, Chris Smith, Jim Brandon, Jordan Riggs, Pancho Morris); Gold (Robert John Brewer, James Paul Xavier, Nathan Mobley, Rick Robinson, David Nett, Gary Karp, Shannon Ivey, Alan Loayza, Shannon Nelson, Jeremy Guskin, Angela Schnaible); The Guild (Vincent Caso, Felicia Day, Jeff Lewis, Amy Okuda, Sandeep Parikh, Robin Thorsen)	**Weird Al Yankovic – (Know Your Meme)**; Chris Hardwick – (Back on Topps); Nathan Fillion – (PG Porn); Wil Wheaton – (The Guild); Courteney Cox – (Web Therapy)
Best Web Series Host	Best Vlogger
**Zadi Diaz – (EPIC FU)**; Michael Buckley – (What The Buck?!); Kevin Pollak – (Kevin Pollak's Chat Show); Alex Albrecht – (Diggnation); Kristyn Burtt – (The Web Files)	**Shane Dawson – (ShaneDawsonTV)**; Brigitte Dale – (Brigitte Dale); iJustine – (iJustine); Philip DeFranco – (sxePhil); Shira Lazar – (Shira Lazar)
CRAFT AWARDS
Best Editing	Best Cinematography
**Zach Arnold for editing The Bannen Way**; Nathan Black, Morgan Jon Fox, and Josh Swain for editing $5 Cover: Memphis; Jochen Kunstler and Jacob Vaughan for editing Angel of Death; Evan Gregory, Andrew Gregory, and Michael Gregory for editing Auto-Tune the News; David Bekoff for editing I Kissed a Vampire	**Christopher Charles Kempinski for cinematography in Riese**; Robert Lam for cinematography in Mountain Man; XiaoSu Han, Andreas Thalhammer for cinematography in LUMINA; Michael Lohmann for cinematography in Circle of Eight; Carl Herse for cinematography in Angel of Death
Best Art Direction	Best Sound Design
**Rick Gilbert for art direction in Green Porno**; Kit Pennebaker for art direction in $99 Music Videos; Matt Enlow for art direction in Mountain Man; Chad Krowchuk for art direction in Riese; Kim Bailey for art direction in Tiki Bar TV; Thierry Chaze for art direction in The Coat	**Kunal Rajan for sound design in Fear Clinic**; Bill Mellow and Kevin Belen for sound design in Riese; Michael Miller for sound design in Mountain Man; Seth Talley for sound design in Rockville, CA; Randy Kiss for sound design in The Vetala
Best Animation	Best Visual Effects
**Magnus Jansson for animation in theGoob**; Dan Meth for animation in College Humor: Hardly Working; David Winn, Alan Lau, Jason Sadler, Brad Rau, Roque Bollestros, Paul Allan, Nica Lorber, and Michael Lipman for animation in Happy Tree Friends; Daniel Baxter, Tommy Watson, and Tina Alexander for animation in How It Should Have Ended; Chris Weller and David Lamps for animation in Inventions	**Jason Bergman, Nicholas Onstad, Bethany Onstad, Jason Knetge, Erik Porn, Ikuo Saito, and David Dang for visual effects in Fear Clinic**; Reece Sanders and Clayton Jacobson for visual effects in Mordy Koots; Erik Beck for visual effects in Backyard FX; Tom Konkle, Thor Melsted, and Mike Smith for visual effects in Safety Geeks: SVI; Jeff Bell, Zack Finfrock, and Brett Register for visual effects in The Crew
Best Live Production in a Web Series	Best Original Music
**Kevin Pollak's Chat Show**; Coin-Op TV Live; Fantasy Football Live!; The RadNerd Show; TWiT.tv	**Evan Gregory, Andrew Gregory and Michael Gregory for Auto-Tune the News**; Chance McClain, Kevin Ryan, Frank Bullington, and Jeremy Botter for Horrible Turn; Mark Douglas for Key of Awesome; Rob Mailhouse, Todd Spahr, and Illeana Douglas for Sparhusen; Thierry Chaze for The Coat
Best Product Integration in a Web Series	Best Interactive Experience in a Web Series
**Easy to Assemble** – (IKEA); Circle of Eight – (Dodge Nitro); The Bannen Way – (Vitamin Water); Valemont – (Verizon Wireless); Woke Up Dead – (Kodak)	**Valemont**; Circle of Eight; I <3 Vampires; Married on MySpace; Wreck & Salvage: Suppendapo
Best Mobile Experience in a Web Series	
**Valemont**; AT&T Life Without Mobile; Mr. Wrong; Playboy: Interns; Seth on Survival	

Streamy Visionary Award Honoree

Chad Hurley - The co-founder of YouTube

=== Web series with multiple nominations and awards ===
Web series that received multiple nominations
Nominations	Web Series
8	The Guild
7	The Bannen Way
6	Easy to Assemble
6	Valemont
5	Girl Number 9
4	Anyone But Me
4	Auto-Tune the News
4	Back on Topps
4	Compulsions
4	Dorm Life
4	The Legend of Neil
4	Riese
3	Angel of Death
3	Circle of Eight
3	Fear Clinic
3	$5 Cover: Memphis
3	Kevin Pollak's Chat Show
3	Mountain Man
3	OzGirl
3	Wainy Days
2	Between Two Ferns with Zach Galifianakis
2	The Coat
2	Diggnation
2	EPIC FU
2	Green Porno
2	Happy Tree Friends
2	How It Should Have Ended
2	Noob
2	PG Porn
2	The Totally Rad Show
2	Web Therapy
2	The Young Turks

Web series that received multiple awards
Awards	Web series
4	The Bannen Way
3	Auto-Tune the News
2	Between Two Ferns with Zach Galifianakis
2	Easy to Assemble
2	Fear Clinic
2	The Guild
2	Valemont

== Reception ==
The show was poorly received by viewers, attendees and sponsors of the event, leading to an apology from the producer, Brady Brim-DeForest, and rumours that sponsors of the event wanted their money refunded. The show was criticized for its long runtime of over 3 hours, technical failures throughout the ceremony, and for containing unfunny, crude and sexist jokes, including jokes about porn, masturbation and vaginal rejuvenation. The show was also interrupted by streakers as part of a stunt by Best Reality or Documentary Web Series nominee Streak to Win. The poor reception of the event, and the surrounding controversy, resulted in the International Academy of Web Television separating from the Streamys to create its own awards, the IAWTV Awards, and a two-year hiatus of the Streamys.

Many online content creators, including iJustine and Chris Hardwick, felt that the ceremony did not represent online content creation and worried that it would be a setback for the medium being taken seriously. iJustine said that the show's skits had made her feel uncomfortable and condemned the excessive vulgarity, saying that she had left the event "feeling confused, embarrassed and a bunch of other emotions that I still have yet to put my finger on." Jim Louderback, CEO of the multi-channel network Revision3, called the show a "misogynistic, puerile, protracted and poorly executed event" and criticised one of the monologues that "went beyond poking fun at the industry, and was more like a spit in the face." YouTuber Michael Buckley also criticized the event in a tweet saying "All of the technical problems were one thing but it seemed like the jokes were picking on the internet – not CELEBRATING what we do." Erin Broadley of LA Weekly similarly opined "The technical difficulties were forgivable for an event only two years young; it was the tone of the program that was most upsetting to people, who saw last year's optimism replaced by self-deprecating humor and masturbation jokes". Due to nominees and award winners' disappointment with the show, an unofficial redo of the ceremony was held at the ACME Comedy Theatre.

== See also ==
- List of Streamy Award winners
