= Leslie, My Name Is Evil =

- Directed by: Reginald Harkema
- Written by: Reginald Harkema
- Produced by: Leonard Farlinger; Jennifer Jonas
- Starring: Kristen Hager; Gregory Smith; Ryan Robbins; Kristin Adams; Peter Keleghan; Kaniehtiio Horn
- Cinematography: Jonathon Cliff
- Edited by: Scott Vickrey
- Music by: Paul Kehayas
- Production company: New Real Films
- Distributed by: Lionsgate
- Release date: September 14, 2009 (TIFF)
- Running time: 85 minutes
- Country: Canada
- Language: English

Leslie, My Name Is Evil is a 2009 Canadian film written and directed by Reginald Harkema. It was renamed Manson, My Name Is Evil after its initial release.

== Plot ==
Leslie is a troubled 1960s teenager who eventually becomes a follower of Charles Manson and is charged, convicted, and sentenced to death in August 1969 for the murders of Leno and Rosemary LaBianca. The story revolves around how a young juror, Perry, becomes infatuated with Leslie during her trial.

== Cast ==
- Kristen Hager as Leslie Van Houten
- Gregory Smith as Perry
- Ryan Robbins as Charlie Manson
- Kristin Adams as Dorothy
- Peter Keleghan as Walter
- Kaniehtiio Horn as Patricia Krenwinkel
- Anjelica Scannura as Susan Atkins
- Travis Milne as Bobby Beausoleil
- Sarah Gadon as Laura
- Tom Barnett as Bob Ronka

== Release ==
After the film was renamed, Twitch Film criticized the film's marketing as deceptive, as it emphasized Manson instead of Van Houten.

== Reception ==
Rotten Tomatoes, a review aggregator website, reports that 67% of nine surveyed critics gave the film a positive review; the average rating is 5.96/10. Rick Groen of The Globe and Mail rated it 2/4 stars and called it "a cinematic essay that occasionally seems smart and sometimes just smart-alecky." Peter Howell of the Toronto Star rated it 1.5/4 stars and wrote that Harkema's comparison of the Manson murders to the Vietnam War "a dubious, illogical and frankly offensive connection to make". Todd Brown of Twitch Film wrote that "despite some very promising elements, Harkema is just not quite up to the task."
