= Leslie Van Houten =

American convicted murderer (born 1949)

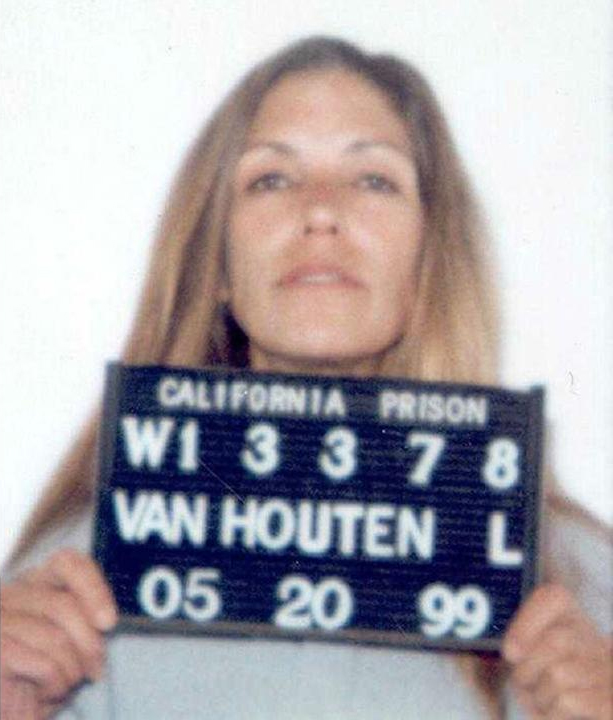
- Mug shot taken in May 1999
- Born: Leslie Louise Van Houten; August 23, 1949 (age 77); Altadena, California, U.S.
- Status: Released on parole in 2023
- Convictions: First degree murder (2 counts); Conspiracy to commit murder
- Penalty: Death; commuted to life imprisonment with the possibility of parole after 7 years

Details
- Date: August 10, 1969
- Killed: 2

Leslie Louise Van Houten (born August 23, 1949) is an American convicted murderer and former member of the Manson Family.

Van Houten was arrested and charged in relation to the 1969 murders of Leno and Rosemary LaBianca. Van Houten was convicted and sentenced to death, but a 1972 California Supreme Court ruling found the death penalty unconstitutional, resulting in her sentence being commuted to life in prison. Her conviction was overturned in a 1976 appellate court decision that granted her a retrial. Her second trial ended with a deadlocked jury and a mistrial. At her third trial in 1978, she was convicted of two counts of murder and one count of conspiracy and sentenced to seven years to life in prison. After spending 53 years in prison and 24 parole hearings, including five that recommended parole (2016–2021) but were vetoed by two California governors, Van Houten was paroled in 2023 when the courts overturned the fifth veto.

== Early life ==
Van Houten was born on August 23, 1949, in the Los Angeles suburb of Altadena to Paul Van Houten and Jane (née Edwards). Her father is of Dutch descent, and her mother is of Irish, English, Scottish, and German descent. She grew up in a middle-class churchgoing family along with an older brother and two adopted siblings, a brother and a sister, who were Korean. Her mother and father divorced when she was 14. She began smoking marijuana, and around the age of 15, began taking LSD. At 17, she ran away with her boyfriend. She returned to complete high school, graduating from Monrovia High School in Monrovia, California in 1967. According to Van Houten, she discovered that she was pregnant and was ordered by her mother to undergo an abortion and bury the fetus in their backyard. Van Houten stated that after that event, she felt very removed from her mother and harbored intense anger toward her. She had a period of interest in yoga and took a year-long secretarial course, but became a hippie, living at a commune.

== Manson Family ==
After a few months in a commune in Northern California, Van Houten met Catherine Share and Bobby Beausoleil and moved in with them and another woman during the summer of 1968. The four broke up after jealous arguments, and Share left to join Charles Manson's commune. Van Houten, then aged 19, followed Share. At that time, she phoned her mother to say she was dropping out and would not be making contact again.

Manson decided when they would eat and sleep, and when and with whom they would have sex. He controlled the taking of LSD, giving followers larger doses than he himself took. According to Manson, "When you take LSD enough times, you reach a state of nothing. Of no thought." According to Van Houten, she became "saturated in acid" and could not grasp the existence of those living a non-psychedelic reality.

From August 1968, Manson and his followers were based at the Spahn Ranch. Manson ostensibly ran his Family based on hippie-style principles of acceptance and free love. At the remote ranch, where they were isolated from any other influences, Manson's was the only opinion heard. At every meal he would lecture repetitively. Van Houten said Manson's attitude was that she "belonged to Bobby [Beausoleil]". According to Van Houten, she and other Manson followers looked to 14-year-old Family member Dianne Lake as the "empty vessel", the epitome of what women were supposed to be in the Manson system of values. When Barbara Hoyt spoke at Van Houten's parole hearing in 2013, she said that Van Houten was considered a "leader" in the Family.

== Murders ==
=== Murders of Leno and Rosemary LaBianca ===
On August 9, 1969, Van Houten, Tex Watson, Patricia Krenwinkel, Linda Kasabian, Susan Atkins, Clem Grogan and Manson went to the house of Rosemary and Leno LaBianca. Manson entered the house with Watson, then left with Kasabian, Atkins, and Grogan.

Van Houten and another woman held down Rosemary LaBianca as Watson stabbed Leno LaBianca. After stabbing Rosemary, Watson gave Van Houten a knife, and she stabbed the woman at least 14 more times. She testified in 1971, "And I took one of the knives, and Patricia [Krenwinkel] had one – a knife – and we started stabbing and cutting up the lady."

=== Motive ===
Manson, who denied responsibility, never explained a motive for the murders. Prosecutor Vincent Bugliosi suggested Manson was attempting to start a racial civil war. This motive was noted by California Supreme Court Justice Manuel Ramirez, in his 2004 decision to deny review of a Court of Appeal ruling upholding Van Houten's denial of parole.

== Trial ==
Manson was accused of orchestrating both attacks, but the only defendants at the trial whose murder charges were for actually inflicting injuries on the LaBiancas were Van Houten and Krenwinkel. Unlike the others, Van Houten was not accused of the murders of Tate and her friends.

Manson opposed his three female co-defendants running a defense that he had asked them to commit killings. Van Houten did not appear to take the court seriously (later claiming to have been supplied with LSD during the trial) and giggled during testimony about the victims. She testified to committing the murders she was charged with and denied that Manson had been involved. An often-cited example of how he seemed to exert control over Van Houten and the others was when Manson carved an X on his forehead and she and the other two women defendants copied him. In the latter stages of the trial they stopped mimicking him, Bugliosi suggested, because they realized it was making the extent of his influence over them apparent.

Van Houten dismissed three defense lawyers in succession for claiming her actions were attributable to Manson's control over her. When her attorney Ronald Hughes was asking an expert witness about the effect of LSD on judgment, Van Houten shouted that, "This is all such a big lie. I was influenced by the war in Vietnam and TV."

On March 29, 1971, she was convicted of murder along with the other defendants. During the sentencing phase of the trial, in an apparent attempt to exonerate Manson, Van Houten testified that she had committed a killing in which she was not involved. She told a psychiatrist of beating her adopted sister, leading him to characterize her as "a spoiled little princess" and a "psychologically loaded gun", and was adamant that Manson had no influence over her thought processes or behavior. Van Houten told the psychiatrist that she would have gone to jail for manslaughter or assault with a deadly weapon without ever meeting Manson. When her lawyer, attempting to show she felt remorse, asked if she felt sorrow or shame for the death of Rosemary LaBianca, Van Houten replied "sorry is only a five-letter word" and "you can't undo something that is done." In cross-examination, Van Houten aggressively implicated herself in inflicting wounds while the victim was living, and severely wounding the victim, severing her spine, which might have been fatal by itself. She vehemently denied acting on instructions from Manson, and said a court-appointed attorney who "had a lot of different ideas on how to get me off" had told her to claim Manson ordered the killings.

Van Houten was sentenced to be executed; she was the youngest woman condemned to death in California. No death row for female prisoners existed, and a special unit was built. The death sentences were automatically commuted to life in prison after the Supreme Court of California's People v. Anderson decision resulted in the invalidation of all death sentences imposed in California prior to 1972. With a first degree murder conviction she was eligible for parole once she had served seven years. In order to be released after seven years, she would have had to have been granted parole at her first parole hearing. The governor would not have been able to rescind that parole, since California governors did not gain that power until Proposition 89 was passed by the voters on November 8, 1988. In his bestselling book Helter Skelter, prosecutor Vincent Bugliosi said that "his guess" was that all three women would be released after 15–20 years.

=== Re-trial ===
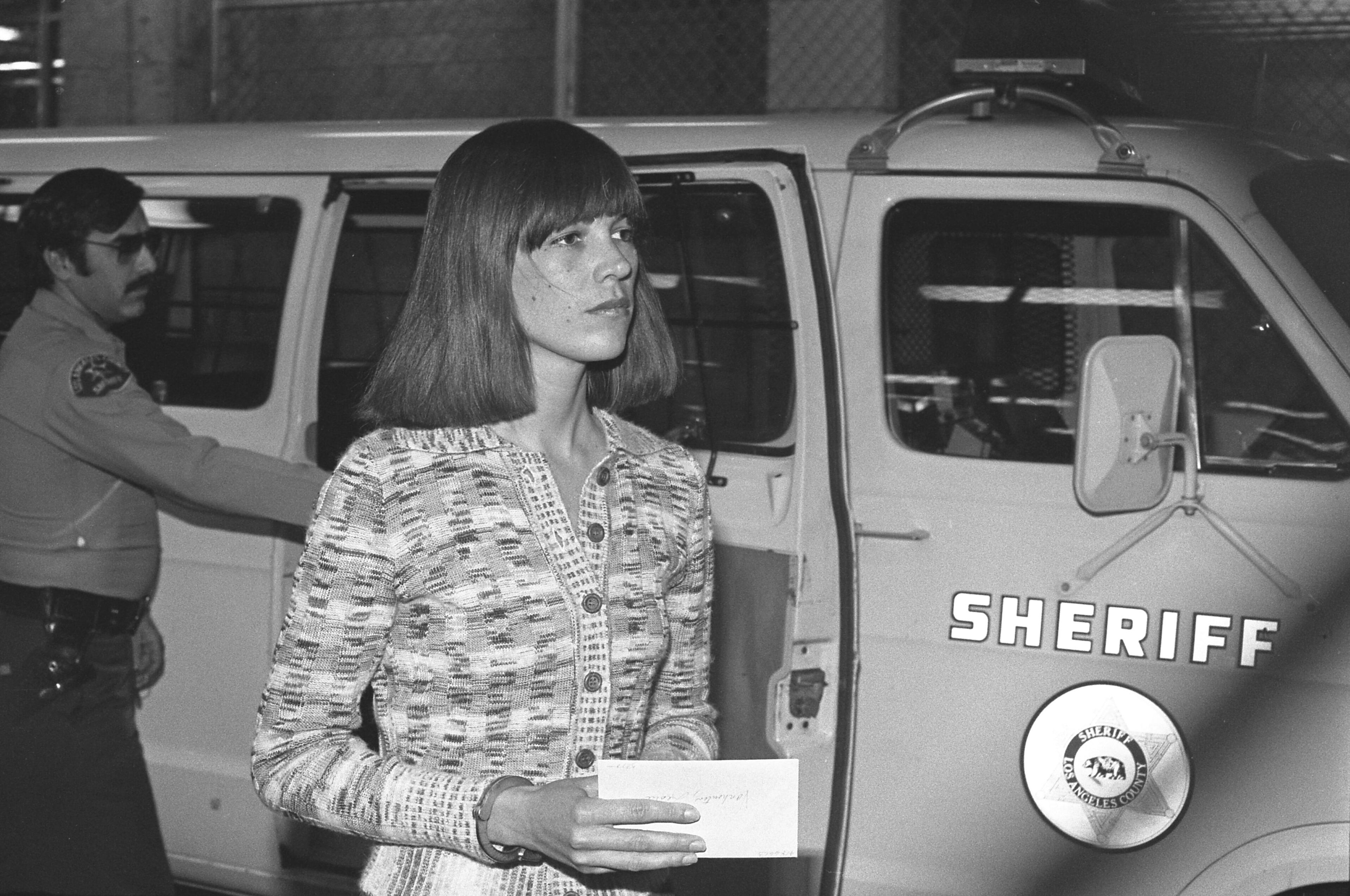
Van Houten arrives at a courthouse for a hearing in December 1976.

Van Houten was granted a retrial in 1977 due to the failure to declare a mistrial when her lawyer Ronald Hughes died. Her defense argued that Van Houten's capacity for rational thought had been diminished due to LSD use and Manson's influence. The jury could not agree on a verdict. According to what the jury foreman told reporters, they thought it was difficult on the basis of the evidence to determine whether Van Houten's judgment had been unimpaired enough for a verdict of first degree murder rather than manslaughter.

It was reported in the news media that because of time already served, Van Houten could go free that year if she was convicted of manslaughter. By law, prosecutors are not allowed to mention the possibility of the defendant being released on parole when arguing for a murder rather than manslaughter conviction because it is considered highly prejudicial to the defendant.

=== Second re-trial ===
The prosecution in 1970–71 had emphasized that the motive had nothing to do with robbery and the killers ignored valuable pieces of property. At Van Houten's second re-trial in 1978, the prosecution, who were being aided by a specialist in diminished responsibility, altered the charges by using the theft of food, clothing and a small sum of money taken from the house to add a charge of robbery, whereby the felony murder rule tended to undermine a defense of reduced capacity. She was on bond for six months before being found guilty of first-degree murder. Van Houten was given a life sentence that entailed eligibility for parole, for which the prosecutor said she would one day be suitable.

== Post-trial events ==
After the first trial, Van Houten and her female co-conspirators Susan Atkins and Patricia Krenwinkel were housed in a special housing unit built at the California Institution for Women. They were initially kept separate from the prison population because they were viewed as a threat to the other inmates.

In the early 1970s, Van Houten, Atkins and Krenwinkel worked with a social worker, Karlene Faith, who sought to help them re-establish their identities separate from the Manson Family. Faith wrote a book about her work with the women, The Long Prison Journey of Leslie Van Houten. In the book, Faith tells how two of the women believed that they would "grow wings and become fairies" after the expected race war had occurred. The women told Faith that they obtained that belief from Manson. Faith viewed all three of the Manson women as victims, and lobbied for their early release from prison. Faith's work with the Manson women was portrayed in the feature film Charlie Says.

Van Houten was befriended by film director John Waters. He campaigned for her early release from prison.

In 1975, the Manson women were moved to the general population at the California Institution for Women.

== Parole requests ==
Under California law, some life sentences are eligible for parole, and a parole board rejection of an application does not preclude a different decision in the future. Susan Atkins and Patricia Krenwinkel, who were originally convicted along with Van Houten and Manson at the main trial, had both been found guilty of the most notorious crime, the murder of five people at 10050 Cielo Drive. In addition, Krenwinkel was convicted of the murders of Leno and Rosemary LaBianca, while Atkins was convicted of murdering Gary Hinman.

One member of the Manson Family has been convicted of murder and released: Steve "Clem" Grogan. Grogan, convicted and given a death sentence by the jury for the torture-murder of Donald Shea with Manson, was freed in 1985. Bruce M. Davis, an accomplice of Manson in the killing of Shea, and with a second conviction for the Gary Hinman killing, was given a parole board recommendation for release in 2010 although very few inmates with even a single conviction on a charge of murder had been able to obtain parole in California before 2011. In each case, the sitting governor ordered a review or reversed the decision. Tex Watson was denied parole for the 15th time on October 27, 2016.

After receiving her 13th rejection, in which the hearing concluded she posed "an unreasonable risk of danger to society", Van Houten took legal action. Judge Bob Krug ordered the board to re-hear the application because their reasoning turned solely on the unalterable gravity of her offense and effectively gave her life without parole, "a sentence unauthorized by law". The judgment was overturned by a higher court, which said although parole hearings must consider evidence for an inmate being rehabilitated, a hearing had discretion to deny parole based solely on a review of the circumstances of the crime, if "some evidence" supported their decision.

In 2013, Van Houten was denied parole for the 20th time at a hearing. In announcing a decision to deny parole, the commissioner of the hearing board said that she had failed to explain how someone of her good background and intelligence could have committed such "cruel and atrocious" murders.

On April 14, 2016, a two-person panel of the California Parole Board recommended granting Van Houten's parole request, but California Governor Jerry Brown vetoed the release on the grounds that "Both her role in these extraordinarily brutal crimes and her inability to explain her willing participation in such horrific violence cannot be overlooked and lead me to believe she remains an unacceptable risk to society if released."

On September 29, 2016, Los Angeles County Superior Court Judge William C. Ryan issued an 18-page ruling upholding the governor's reversal earlier in the year of a parole board's decision to release Van Houten. Ryan wrote that there was "some evidence" that Van Houten presents an unreasonable threat to society. On December 21, the California Supreme Court denied Van Houten's petition to hear the case.

Van Houten has long since renounced Manson, who died in prison in November 2017. She has expressed remorse for her crimes, and at her 2013 parole hearing, her attorney argued that her value system was completely different from what it was in 1972. She expressed that she "takes offense to the fact that Manson doesn't own up" to his role in the murders. She told Vincent Bugliosi, the man who sent her to prison, "I take responsibility for my part, and part of my responsibility was helping to create him." She has written several short stories, once edited the prison newspaper and did some secretarial work at the prison.

Van Houten was again recommended for parole at her 21st parole hearing on September 6, 2017. The two-member panel found that Van Houten had radically changed her life in the more than 40 years she had been incarcerated. Governor Jerry Brown again denied her parole on January 19, 2018. Her legal team stated they would fight the decision. On June 29, 2018, Van Houten's parole was once again vetoed. The judge was again William C. Ryan, who said "Unless the inmate can demonstrate that there is no evidence to support the governor's conclusion that the inmate is a current danger to public safety, the petition fails to state a prima facie case for relief and may be summarily denied."

On January 30, 2019, during her 22nd parole hearing, Van Houten was recommended for parole for the third time. But on June 4, 2019, Governor Gavin Newsom overruled the parole board's recommendation, claiming the then 69-year-old Van Houten was still a "danger to society" and that she had "potential for future violence". She appealed the governor's decision, but on September 21, 2019, the appeals court panel ruled 2–1 in the governor's favor.

Van Houten was recommended for parole for the fourth time at a 23rd parole hearing on July 23, 2020, and a 120-day legal review period began. On November 28, Newsom again rejected the board's recommendation and vetoed Van Houten's parole. Among his reasons for denial, Newsom stated the then 71-year-old Van Houten "currently poses an unreasonable danger to society if released from prison". Again, her lawyer, Rich Pfeiffer, said they would appeal the governor's latest decision, but her request for review was rejected by the California Supreme Court on February 9, 2022.

On November 9, 2021, Van Houten was again recommended for parole by a parole board. On March 29, 2022, Governor Newsom again overruled the parole board's recommendation.

On May 30, 2023, a California Court of Appeal in Los Angeles set aside Governor Newsom's denial of Van Houten's parole, thus making her the first Manson family member to have a court rule in her favor for a parole recommendation. On July 7, 2023, Newsom announced that he would not file an appeal with the California Supreme Court to block her parole, paving the way for her release. Van Houten was released on parole on July 11, 2023, after serving over 52 years in prison. According to her attorney, citing the California Department of Corrections and Rehabilitation, Van Houten was transferred to a "transitional living facility" while subject to parole supervision. Her parole would last up to a maximum of three years, with her first discharge review scheduled after the first year. On August 7, 2025, she was formally discharged from parole, marking the end of her sentence. Sharon Tate's sister, Debra Tate, reacted to Van Houten's release by stating during an interview on the ABC News program Nightline, "Is she a nice girl? No. Is she an animal? I think she was then, and I fear that she still is." Krenwinkel and Watson remained imprisoned.

== In the media ==
Van Houten's parole hearings have appeared on Court TV and attracted nationwide media attention. They have featured comments from former prosecutors, relatives of her victims, and relatives of the victims of other killers. John Waters advocated for Van Houten's parole.

Van Houten told her story on the podcast Ear Hustle in the 2021 episode "Home for Me Really is a Memory".

=== Dramatic portrayals ===
Van Houten was portrayed by actress Cathey Paine in the 1976 made-for-TV film Helter Skelter. San Francisco-based actress Connie Champagne portrayed Van Houten in Dude Theater's 1989 stage play The Charlie Manson Story, first at Climate Theater and then Theatre Artaud, a black comedy directed by Christopher Brophy. The production was the first to de-glamorourize the Manson-myth and to question Manson's belief in the so-called "Helter Skelter". The 2009 film Leslie, My Name Is Evil (released in some countries under the titles Manson Girl and Manson, My Name Is Evil) is partially based on Van Houten's early life and stars actress Kristen Hager as Van Houten. In Helter Skelter (2004 remake of the 1976 film) Van Houten was portrayed by actress Catherine Wadkins. A year earlier, in 2003, Amy Yates portrayed Leslie Van Houten in the film The Manson Family. In the 2015 NBC fictional series Aquarius, which centers on the Los Angeles Police Department and the Manson murders, Emma Dumont portrays a character named "Emma", who is loosely based on Van Houten. Tania Raymonde portrayed Van Houten in Susanna Lo's 2016 film Manson Girls. Later in 2016, Greer Grammer portrayed Van Houten in Leslie Libman's film Manson's Lost Girls, which starred MacKenzie Mauzy as Kasabian. In 2018 she was portrayed by Gabrielle Klobucar in the made-for-TV documentary Inside the Manson Cult: The Lost Tapes. Also in 2018, English actress Hannah Murray played Van Houten in the feature movie Charlie Says. In 2019, Van Houten was played by Victoria Pedretti in Quentin Tarantino's film Once Upon a Time in Hollywood.
