= Compulsions =

2009 drama web series

- Official poster
- Also known as: Compulsions: The Web Series
- Genre: Thriller/Drama
- Created by: Bernie Su
- Directed by: Nathan Atkinson
- Starring: Craig Frank; Janna Bossier; Annemarie Pazmino
- Theme music composer: Sally Chou
- Composer: Sally Chou
- Country of origin: United States
- Original language: English
- No. of seasons: 1
- No. of episodes: 8

Production
- Executive producer: Bernie Su
- Producers: Robert Grand; Michael Tohl
- Production location: Hollywood
- Editor: Michael Darrow
- Camera setup: SONY EX-1
- Running time: 3-6 minutes

Original release
- Network: Dailymotion
- Release: December 1, 2009

Compulsions is a drama web series which debuted Dec 01, 2009 on Dailymotion.com. The show stars Craig Frank as Mark Sandler, an admitted Sadist leading a life with a dull desk job, alongside Justine Davis as Janna Bossier, Mark's friend and handler, and Annemarie Pazmino as Cassandra Morrissey.

== Premise ==
The series is the internal character story of Mark Sandler (Craig Frank), an admitted Sadist leading a life with a dull desk job. At night, he channels his inner compulsions as a professional interrogator, brutally and psychological extracting bits of crucial information from his "clients". Mark's one true friend and handler is Justine Davies (Janna Bossier) a compulsive Trophy Hunter and ruthless Retrieval Specialist who feeds Mark's compulsions with fresh interrogation subjects. Mark's world is threatened with the introduction of compulsive voyeur Cassandra Morrissey (Annemarie Pazmino).

== Characters ==
- Mark Sandler - Played by Craig Frank
- Justine Davis - Played by Janna Bossier
- Cassandra Morrissey - Played by Annemarie Pazmino

== Awards ==
=== Won ===
- 2010 Streamy Awards – Best Writing for a Drama Web Series (Bernie Su)

=== Nominated ===
- 2010 Streamy Awards – Best Drama Web Series, Best Directing for a Drama Web Series (Nathan Atkinson), Best Male Actor in a Drama Web Series (Craig Frank)
