= Kristen Hager =

Canadian actress (born 1983)

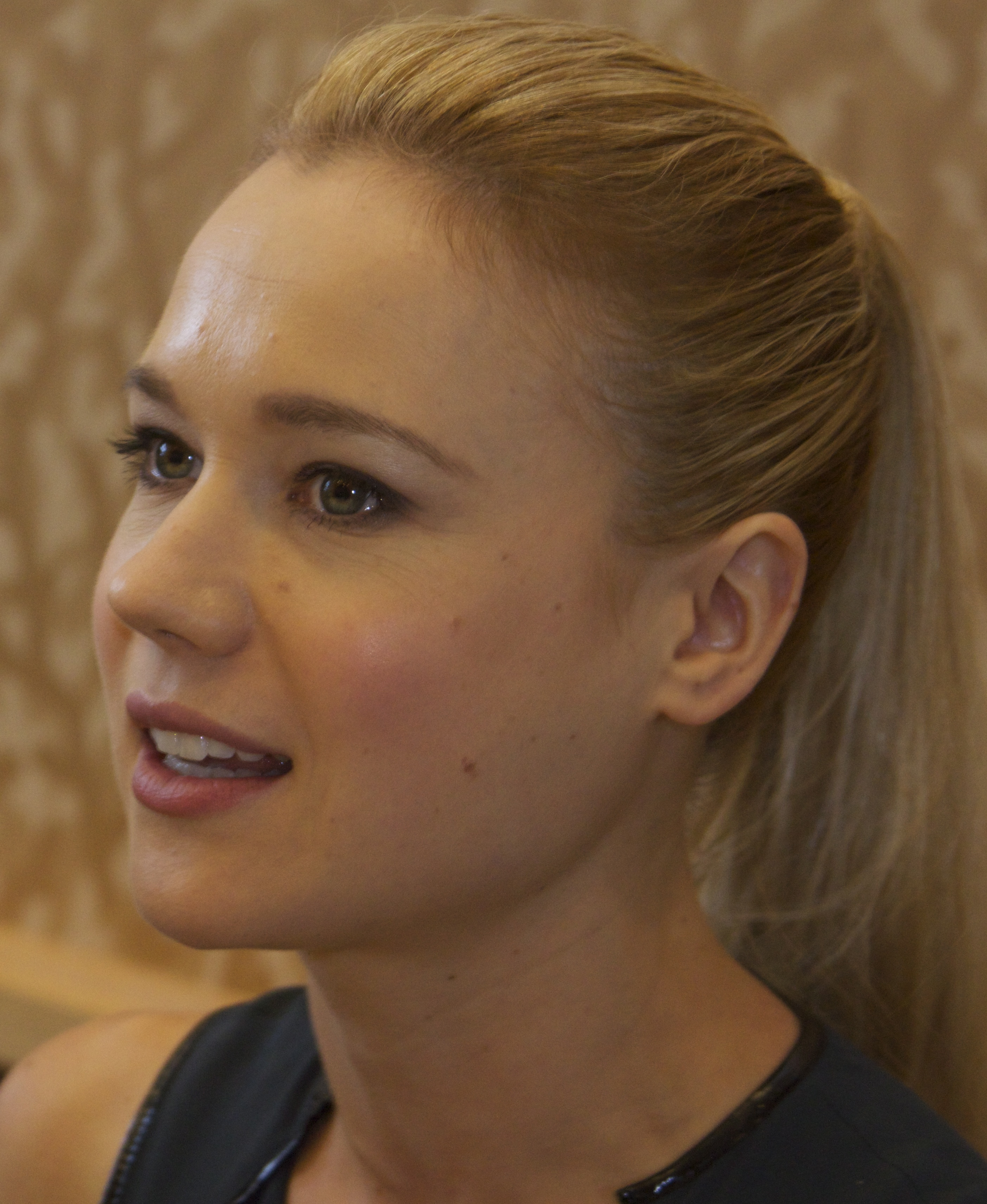
- Hager at San Diego Comic-Con in July 2013, promoting Being Human.
- Born: January 2, 1983 (age 43); Red Lake, Ontario, Canada
- Occupation: Actress
- Years active: 2005–present
- Spouse: Matt Jones (m. 2020)
- Children: 1

Kristen Hager (born January 2, 1983) is a Canadian actress. She co-starred in films Aliens vs. Predator: Requiem (2007) and Wanted (2008), and played Leslie Van Houten in the independent film Leslie, My Name Is Evil (2009). From 2011 to 2014, Hager starred as Nora Sergeant in the Syfy supernatural comedy-drama series, Being Human.

== Life and career ==
Hager made her first television appearance in the Lifetime mini-series where she gained a role on the Beach Girls in 2005. The following year, Hager had the recurring role on the short-lived The CW series, Runaway. In 2007, she had a small part in the biographical drama film I'm Not There, and in the same year played one of the female leads in the science-fiction action horror film Aliens vs. Predator: Requiem, the sequel to Alien vs. Predator. In 2008, she played James McAvoy's character's girlfriend in the action thriller, Wanted.

In 2009, Hager played the leading role in the independent film Leslie, My Name Is Evil about Leslie Van Houten. She had a supporting role in the Canadian family drama series, Wild Roses, and starred as the lead character in the MTV miniseries Valemont. In 2011, she was cast as Nora Sergeant in the Syfy supernatural comedy-drama series, Being Human. The series ended after four seasons in 2014. Hager also appeared in the films A Little Bit Zombie (2012), The Right Kind of Wrong (2013) and The Barber. In 2015, Hager was cast as a lead character on the ABC drama pilot The Adversaries, about a New York legal dynasty, co-starring alongside Christine Lahti and Terry O'Quinn.

== Personal life ==
On December 21, 2020, she married actor and comedian Matt Jones. They have a daughter, born in 2022.

== Filmography ==
=== Film ===
Year	Film	Role	Notes
2007	I'm Not There	Mona / Polly	
2007	Aliens vs. Predator: Requiem	Jesse Salinger	
2008	Wanted	Cathy	
2009	You Might as Well Live	Cookie De Whitt	
2009	Leslie, My Name Is Evil	Leslie Van Houten	
2011	Textuality	Dani	
2011	Servitude	Jenny	
2012	A Little Bit Zombie	Sarah	
2013	The Right Kind of Wrong	Julie Deere	
2014	The Barber	Audrey	
2015	Life	Veronica	
2015	In Embryo	Lilly	
2018	Clara	Rebecca	
2019	The Turkey Bowl	Jennifer "Jen" Harrison	
2020	Blood and Money	Debbie	

=== Television ===
Year	Title	Role	Notes
2005	Recipe for a Perfect Christmas	Morgan	Television film
2005	Beach Girls	Skye	Main role; 6 episodes
2006	Runaway	Kylie	9 episodes
2007	St. Urbain's Horseman	Ingrid	Miniseries
2008	The Dresden Files	Polly	Episode: "Storm Front"
2008	Sophie	Miriam Cambridge	Episode: "Guess Who's Coming to Dinner?"
2008	Of Murder and Memory	Aimee Linden	Television film
2009	Wild Roses	Adele Emond	7 episodes
2009	The Listener	Anna Sokur	Episode: "I'm An Adult"
2009	Valemont	Maggie Gracen / Sophie Fields	Miniseries
2009	Sorority Wars	Heather	Television film
2010	CSI: Miami	Melissa Walls	2 episodes
2010	Ties That Bind	Rachel Thomas	Television film
2011	NCIS: Los Angeles	Star	Episode: "Imposters"
2011–2014	Being Human	Nora Sergeant	Main role (seasons 2–4; recurring role, season 1); 39 episodes
2014	Untitled Miami Project	Luanne	Pilot
2015	The Adversaries	Jess Fisher	Pilot
2015	The Expanse	Ade Nygaard	2 episodes
2015	Masters of Sex	Isabella Ricci	Episode: "Two Scents"
2016	Gotham	Nora Fries	2 episodes
2017	The Kennedys: After Camelot	Joan Kennedy	4 episodes
2017	Law & Order: Special Victims Unit	Abby Clarke	Episode: "Spellbound"
2017	Schitt's Creek	Amy Grace	Episode: "Opening Night"
2018	NCIS: New Orleans	Adrian Conner	Episode: "Identity Crisis"
2018–2020	Condor	Mae Barber	Main role
2021–2022	Chicago Med	Stevie Hammer	Main cast (season 7; 14 episodes)
2025	Suits LA	Valerie Thompson	3 episodes
