= The Crew (web series) =

- Genre: Comedy, Science fiction
- Created by: Brett Register
- Written by: Brett Register
- Directed by: Brett Register
- Starring: Philip Bache; Brett Register; Jessica Rose; Craig Frank; Ariel Lazarus; Amy Kline; Angie Cole; Robin Thorsen
- Country of origin: United States
- Original language: English
- No. of seasons: 2
- No. of episodes: 21

Production
- Executive producers: Brett Register; Amber J. Lawson
- Producer: Cheo Ramsey

Original release
- Release: 2007 – 2009

The Crew is a sitcom web series that follows the lives of the engine room crew of the starship Azureas. The production had a financed 15-episode first season run, and was distributed through blip.tv, YouTube and Koldcast.tv. It was acquired for a second season run and distributed by Babelgum, known for The Guild and Lonelygirl15.

With help from a major distributor for the second season, The Crew has gained the attention of traditional news outlets such as The Wall Street Journal.

In 2010, The Crew was nominated for Best Visual Effects at the Second Annual Streamy Awards.

There have been no new episodes since 2009, and the creator appears to have moved onto other projects.

== Cast ==
- Philip Bache as Tom Wikenson
- Brett Register as Tim Waterson
- Craig Frank as Patrick Fargent
- Ariel Lazarus as Andrea Lee
- Amy Kline as Jennifer Parker
- Michael Hart as Stewart Kobbler
- Angie Cole as Amber
- Michelle Exarhos as Luet. Sarah Clauson
- Stephen Christian as Crewman Anderson
- Zack Finfrock as Crewman Bennett
- Cathy Baron as Dr. Talia
- Daniel Norman as Evil Patrick and Vrock
- Robin Thorsen as Aguile
- Benny Fine as Glon
- Payman Benz as Laurent
- Chad Jamian as Jala
- Jessica Rose as Map
- Taryn O'Neil as Corrine
- Sherwood Tondorf III as Tondorf

== Plot ==
=== Season 1 (2007–2008) ===
Title	Writer(s)	Director	Original airdate	#
"Pilot"	Brett Register	Brett Register	December 6, 2007	1
The Crew investigates a mysterious error sensor coming from the engine coil.
"Last Romantics"	Brett Register	Brett Register	December 13, 2007	2
Romance is all around on board the U.S. Azureas.
"Ghost Ship"	Brett Register	Brett Register	December 20, 2007	3
The Crew of the U.S. Azeruas come across an unidentified Ghost Ship out in space.
"Poop Deck"	Brett Register	Brett Register	December 27, 2007	4
Stewart Kobbler cleans up the engine room while the crew is away on their mission.
"An Explanation of Sorts"	Brett Register	Brett Register	January 3, 2008	5
With the Engine Room Crew back from their trip to the Ghost Ship, the mysteries discovered on board are revealed.
"Departed"	Brett Register	Brett Register	January 10, 2008	6
The U.S. Azureas is enlisted to track down and investigate a mysterious signal emanating from deep space.
"No Escape"	Brett Register	Brett Register	January 17, 2008	7
After the incident in the Engine Room, the ship is required to undergo a system update, implementing new safety protocols. During which, The Crew is released to the residence for some R&R.
"Barfly"	Brett Register	Brett Register	January 24, 2008	8
A classmate from Tim's past joins The Crew. Meanwhile, Jenni and her roommate Amber prepare for their night out.
"Verdict"	Brett Register	Brett Register	January 31, 2008	9
The truth about what "really" happened in the Residence is revealed.
"Call The Doctor"	Bernie Su	Brett Register	February 7, 2008	10
A doctor from the residence examines the crew. Tom is less than excited about getting examined.
"Break Ups to Make Ups"	Bernie Su and Brett Register	Brett Register	February 14, 2008	11
While Tom's obsession for Dr. Talia grows, Andrea implements her own seduction strategy.
"Cloned I"	Brett Register	Brett Register	February 21, 2008	12
The Crew investigates a mysterious rock found floating in space.
"Cloned II"	Brett Register	Brett Register	February 28, 2008	13
As the clones begin to take over the engine room, The Crew finally starts to figure out that something strange is in fact going on.
"Cloned III"	Brett Register	Brett Register	March 4, 2008	14
The conclusion to the epic clone saga.
"The Signal"	Brett Register	Brett Register	March 11, 2008	15
The origin of the signal is revealed in the season finale of The Crew.

=== Season 2 (2008-2009) ===
Title	Writer(s)	Director	Original airdate	#	
"Survival"	Brett Register	Brett Register	November 27, 2008	1	16
After being spit out of the black hole to the other side of the galaxy, the crew struggles to find leadership and a way home.
"Captives"	Brett Register	Brett Register	May 28, 2009	2	17
While being held captive by the Pirates, Tim and Patrick form an unlikely alliance.
"A Pirate's Life"	Brett Register	Brett Register	June 4, 2009	3	18
While inspecting the Pirate ship, Tom, Tim and Patrick find it well equipped and contains two captives, one with a possible treasure map on her back. Guest Starring Jessica Rose and Chad Jamian.
"Misguided"	Brett Register	Brett Register	June 11, 2009	4	19
Tom cancels all efforts to chart a way back home and, instead, turns the crew’s attention to finding lost treasure.
"Baby on Board"	Brett Register	Brett Register	June 18, 2009	5	20
Tim and Jenni discuss their relationship, while Andrea returns stirring up Tom and Stewart.
"Rendezous"	Brett Register	Brett Register	July 8, 2009	6	21
In the Mid-Season Finale, while on an Away Mission, Tom, Tim, Patrick and Jala run into some baddies as Andrea gets a special visitor in the brig. Taryn O’Neill and Woody Tondorf Guest Star.
