= Evan Mandery =

American author (born 1967)

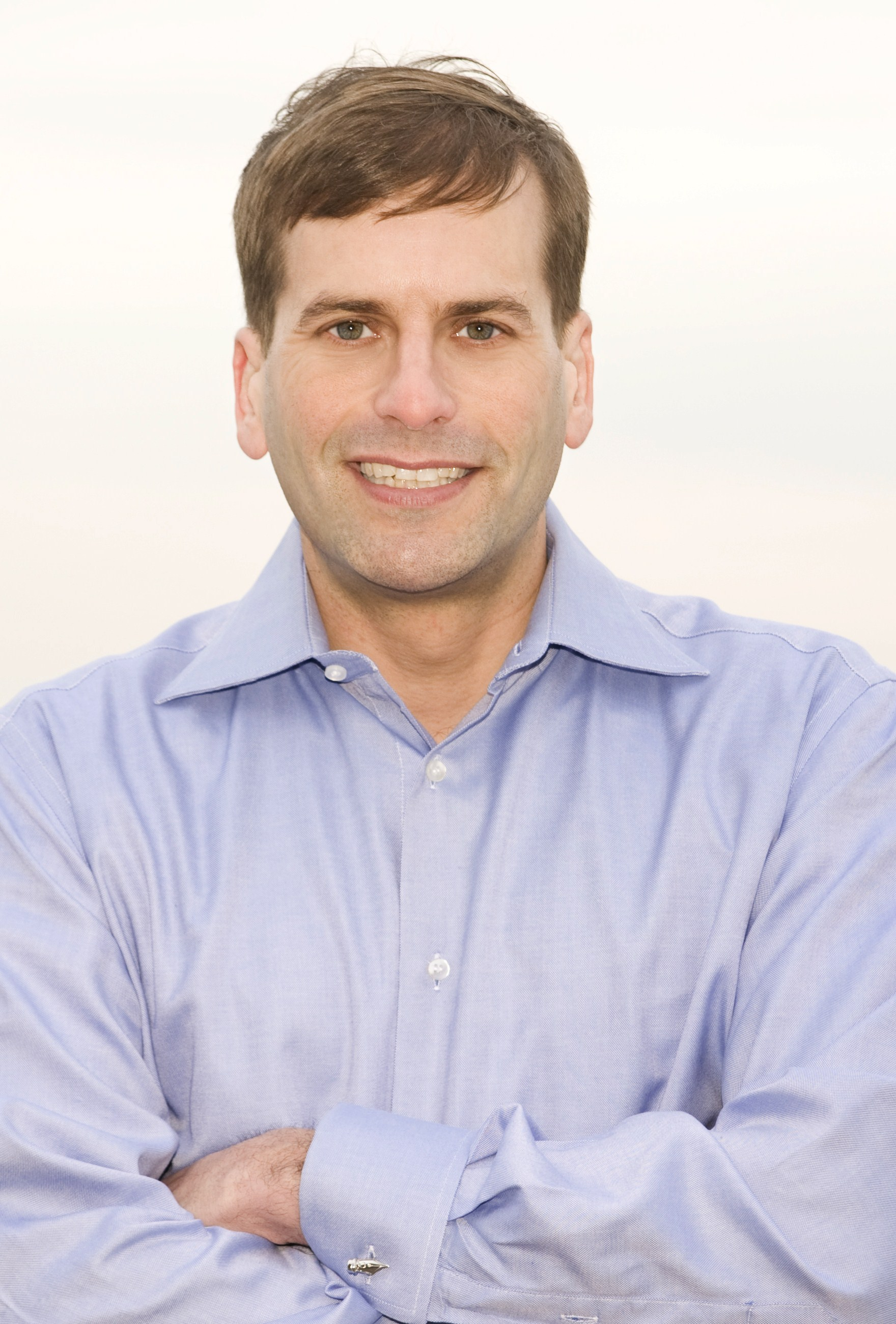
- Mandery in 2013
- Born: 1967 (age 58–59); Brooklyn, New York, U.S.
- Education: Harvard College, Harvard Law School
- Occupations: Author, Professor
- Spouse: Valli Rajah-Mandery
- Children: 3
- Writing career
- Genres: Humor, Literature, Fantasy & Science Fiction
- Website: evanmandery.com

Evan Mandery (born 1967) is an American author and criminal justice academic at John Jay College of Criminal Justice.

== Career ==
Mandery graduated from Harvard College in 1989 with a Bachelor of Arts degree in Social Studies. Later he graduated from Harvard Law School as Juris Doctor in 1992. He is a professor and chairperson of the criminal justice department, John Jay College of Criminal Justice. Mandery lives in Manhasset, New York. His wife, Valli Rajah-Mandery, is a sociologist, and they have three children. He was influenced by the writings of Kurt Vonnegut and Douglas Adams. Mandery is also an amateur poker player.

== Works of Fiction ==
=== Dreaming of Gwen Stefani ===
Mandery's first novel Dreaming of Gwen Stefani was published in 2007. A review about the book was available on Booklist magazine. The novel deals with a mathematical genius and hot-dog vendor who falls in love with Gwen Stefani.

=== First Contact (Or It's Later Than You Think) ===
Mandery's second novel, First Contact, Or, It's Later Than You Think, was published by HarperCollins in January, 2010. It is a story of a hyper-intelligent alien species and a dim-witted President, who is mistrustful of the aliens without basis. The book was reviewed in Booklist, Publishers Weekly, Library Journal and the Winnipeg Free Press.

=== Q ===
Q was published by HarperCollins in August, 2011. It is a story based on time travel, where the unnamed protagonist is visited by his future self and advised not to marry the love of his life. The novel was reviewed by The New York Times, the Financial Times, The Times Literary Supplement and Booklist magazine.

Q was published in the UK in July 2012 and thereafter translated into Italian (under the title Q una storia d'amore), Polish (as Q. Ponadczasowa historia miłosna), and Czech (as Má věčná Q).

In November, 2011, Columbia Pictures optioned the movie rights to Q. David Gordon Green was hired to write the screenplay and direct.

=== Artificial ===
Artificial, also referred to as ArtificialNext, is the first ever scripted and interactive show distributed on twitch.tv. Created by Bernie Su and Evan Mandery, Artificial follows Dr. Matt Lin (Tohoru Masamune) and his artificial intelligence creation/daughter Sophie (Tiffany Chu). Dr. Lin socializes Sophie with the live and interactive Twitch audience in order to help her become human. Episodes are broken into recorded and live scenes. In the live scenes, the audience directly influences the story, and, through in-stream polls and comments, helps the characters make decisions. The first season ran weekly from August 12, 2018, through October 25, 2018 for a total of sixteen episodes and accrued more than two million views. The second season began on March 6, 2019, and will conclude on August 28. In 2019, the series was awarded the Peabody Futures of Media Award for Webisode. The series also received a Creative Arts Emmy Award in 2018 for Outstanding Innovation in Interactive Media. Artificial has a spinoff podcast, Artificial Uncovered, which is an in-universe transmedia video podcast that airs as two livestreams with one of the show's two hosts providing commentary and taking questions on a pre-recorded podcast with both hosts. The audio of the pre-recorded segments is also posted for download.

=== The Professional ===
The Professional was published in 2020 by Classics of Golf. The Classics of Golf Library was founded and curated by Herbert Warren Wind. The novel tells the story of a journeyman professional golfer at different stages of his life.

== Works of non-fiction ==
Mandery began as a non-fiction writer and his first book The Campaign: Rudy Giuliani, Ruth Messinger, Al Sharpton and the Race to be Mayor of New York was published in 1999 by Westview Press. His academic writing focuses on capital punishment, and he has published two books on the subject named Capital Punishment in America: A Balanced Examination and A Wild Justice: The Death and Resurrection of Capital Punishment in America. A Wild Justice was reviewed by The New York Times.

Mandery is a critic of legacy preference and colleges admissions practices generally at Harvard and other elite private colleges. His op-eds have appeared in The New York Times, Huffington Post, CNN, The Harvard Crimson, and Daily News.

In 2022, Poison Ivy: How Elite Colleges Divide Us, was published by The New Press. In it, Mandery argues that elite colleges exacerbate social inequality.

== Books ==
- The campaign: Rudy Giuliani, Ruth Messenger, Al Sharpton, and the race to be mayor of New York City, 1999, ISBN 978-0813366982
- Eyes on City Hall: A Young Man's Education in New York Political Warfare, 2001, ISBN 978-0813398150
- Dreaming of Gwen Stefani, 2007, ISBN 978-0977197262
- First Contact: Or, It's Later Than You Think, 2010, ISBN 978-0061749773
- Capital Punishment: A Balanced Examination, 2011, ISBN 978-1449605988
- Q: A Novel, 2011, ISBN 978-0062098832
- A Wild Justice: The Death and Resurrection of Capital Punishment in America, 2013, ISBN 978-0393239584
- Poison Ivy: How Elite Colleges Divide Us, 2022, ISBN 9781620976951
