= Fear Clinic =

- Directed by: Robert Green Hall
- Starring: Robert Englund; Kane Hodder; Danielle Harris; Lisa Wilcox
- Country of origin: United States
- Original language: English
- No. of episodes: 5

Production
- Producers: Fear Chamber Productions; Dry County Films

Original release
- Release: October 26, 2009

Fear Clinic is a 2009 web series that was directed by Robert Green Hall and distributed through FEARnet. The series comprised five webisodes and starred Robert Englund, Kane Hodder, Danielle Harris, and Lisa Wilcox. Englund commented that it was initially difficult for him to "wrap [his] head around the idea of the webisode because it’s consolidated storytelling". A feature-length film was released on October 22, 2014.

== Synopsis ==
The series follows Dr. Andover (Robert Englund) a psychiatrist that desires to cure the fears of the population despite having lost his medical license. Andover has created the "Fear Chamber", a device that will totally immerse the patient in his or her worst fear. His techniques don't seem to work on everyone, as in the case of Susan (Danielle Harris), a woman that Andover is keeping captive until he can cure her.

== Cast ==
- Robert Englund as Dr. Andover
- Kane Hodder as Villatoro
- Danielle Harris as Susan
- Lisa Wilcox as Nurse Owens
- Angel Oquendo as Garcia
- Kate Nauta as Jackie
- Tory Kittles as Jonte
- John F. Beach as Ajax
- Lucas Till as Brett

== Episodes ==
No. overall	No. in season	Title	Original release date
1	1	"Hydrophobia"	October 27, 2009
2	2	"Scotophobia"	November 3, 2009
3	3	"Entomophobia"	November 10, 2009
4	4	"Misophobia"	November 24, 2009
5	5	"Claustrophobia"	December 8, 2009

== Film ==
In 2011 Englund stated that he, Harris, and Till were interested in starring in a feature film adaptation of the series that would expand upon the story line from the web series. Robert Hall returned to direct the film, and raised part of the movie's funding through fan donations on the crowdfunding website Indiegogo. Harris later withdrew from the project for unspecified reasons, and it was later announced that actors Fiona Dourif, Thomas Dekker, and Cleopatra Coleman were attached to the project. Hall began filming in late 2013 in Medina, Ohio.

Of the film, Englund commented that the series had initially been envisioned as a feature film entitled Fear Chamber and had gone through several iterations before becoming the web series and eventually in film format.

== Awards ==
Award	Category	Recipient	Result
2010 Streamy Awards	Best Male Actor in a Dramatic Web Series	Robert Englund	Nominated
2010 Streamy Awards	Best Sound Design	Kunal Rajan	Won
2010 Streamy Awards	Best Visual Effects	Jason Bergman, Nicholas Onstad, Bethany Onstad, Jason Knetge, Erik Porn, Ikuo Saito, and David Dang	Won
