= Mommy XXX =

American reality television web series

- Genre: Reality
- Created by: John Ferrie
- Directed by: John Ferrie
- Starring: Demi Delia; Chris Snail; Brandi Snail; Randy Spears
- Country of origin: United States
- Original language: English
- No. of seasons: 1
- No. of episodes: 13

Production
- Executive producers: Justin Born; John Ferrie; Viet Huynh; Choky Lim we
- Running time: 4-6 minutes (per ep.)

Original release
- Network: Crackle
- Release: June 18 – September 10, 2009

Mommy XXX is an American reality television web series directed and produced by John Ferrie and starring former porn star Demi Delia. The show was produced by Teru Media and premiered on Sony Pictures Entertainment owned Crackle on June 18, 2009. The show "chronicles the life of Demi Delia, an actively working porn star with two teenage children...". New episodes streamed on Thursday through September 10, 2009.

== Overview ==
"Mommy XXX takes us inside Demi's home -- known as "the Castle or Compound"—in The Valley where porn wannabes and naive newcomers to the adult film world hang out. In documenting the day-to-day life of a busy mom who also happens to be a real-life porn star, Mommy XXX episodes will expose Demi Delia's personal side..."

== Cast ==
- Demi Delia
- Chris Snail
- Brandi Snail
- Randy Spears

== Episodes ==
No.	Title	Original release date
1	"Boob Job #11"	June 18, 2009
To stay current in the porn industry, Demi Delia goes for her eleventh breast augmentation surgery, much to the chagrin of her children.
2	"My Boobs Hurt"	June 25, 2009
Delia is recovering well from her breast augmentation, but has a hard time being served bedside.
3	"On the Porno Set"	July 2, 2009
Delia needs to shoot a video for her new website, and she elects to have her ex-husband Randy Spears costar with her. Her two kids are not amused.
4	"Party with Pornstars"	July 9, 2009
Delia goes to dinner and a club for her birthday. Many of her fellow costars are in attendance.
5	"Puppy Rescue"	July 16, 2009
Delia's children, Chris and Brandi, go to a dog rescue center to help get some pit bulls adopted.
6	"Female Parts"	July 23, 2009
Delia accompanies her daughter Brandi to her first trip to the gynecologist.
7	"Porn Goes Psychic"	July 30, 2009
Delia invites a psychic to her home to give predictions to her and the other housemates.
8	"Handling Big Balls"	August 6, 2009
Delia, her children, Spears, and friends all go bowling. One of Delia's friends feels judged by the other bowlers for her appearance.
9	"My Little Brandi"	August 13, 2009
Delia's daughter, Brandi, is turning fifteen, and is having a co-ed party.
10	"Hot Girls Can't Drive"	August 20, 2009
Delia's son Chris and her friend Alanah Rae, a fellow porn actress, get driving lessons.
11	"Tattooed Vegans"	August 27, 2009
Delia's son Chris, and a couple of his friends go to a tattoo parlor for new tattoos and tattoo upkeep.
12	"Randy Spears in the Flesh"	September 3, 2009
Delia's ex-husband, Randy Spears begins researching how to switch from the porn industry to the voice over industry.
13	"Demi Delia aka Mommy XXX"	September 10, 2009
In the season finale, Delia and her children discuss how they have gotten to where they currently are and what they want to do in the future.
