= Bernie Su =

American web series creator

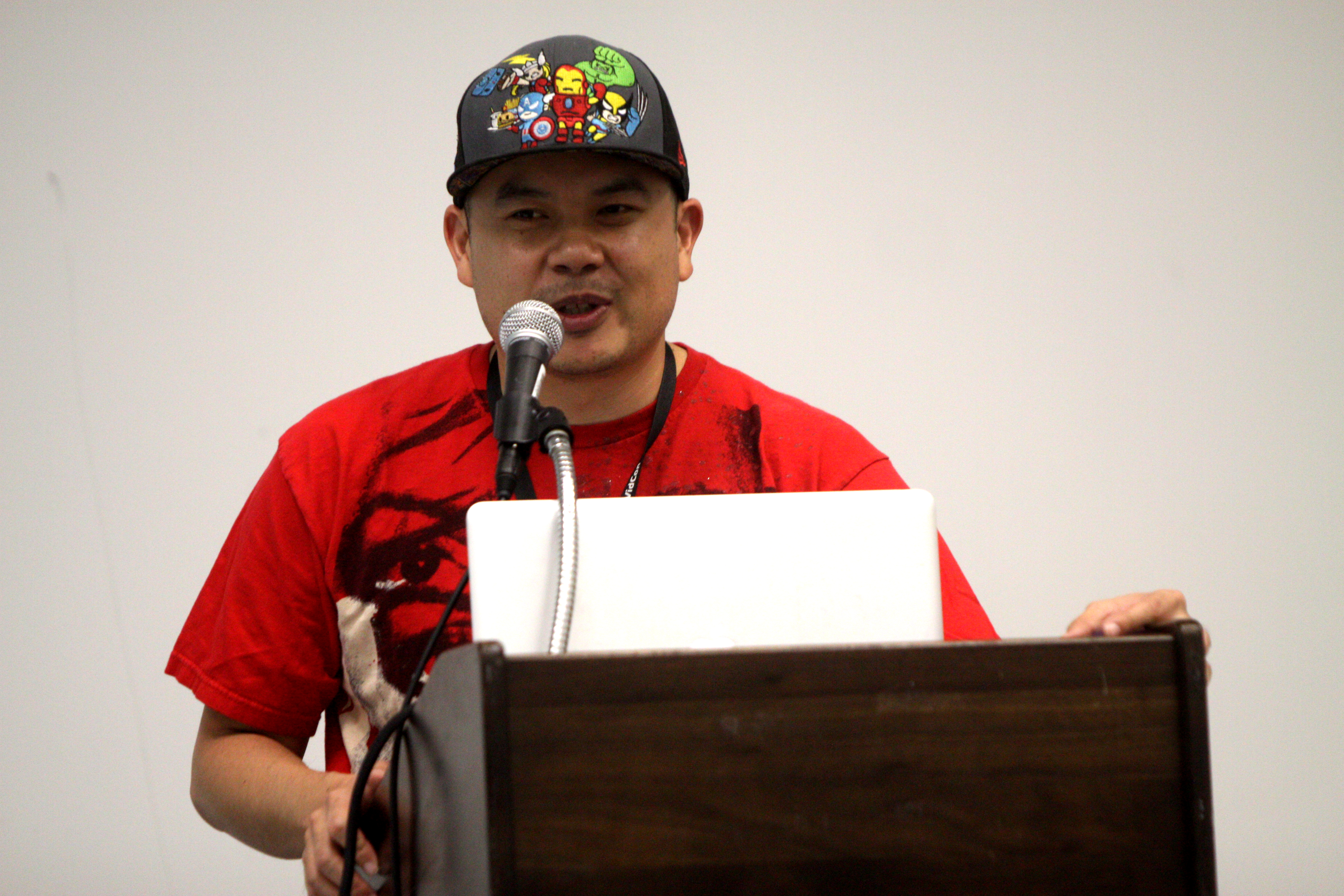
- Su at Vidcon 2012
- Born: May 31, unknown year
- Occupations: Web series creator, writer, director, film producer
- Years active: 2007–present
- Notable work: The Lizzie Bennet Diaries, Emma Approved

Bernie Su is an American web series creator, writer, director and producer. He is best known for his work on the Emmy Award-winning web series The Lizzie Bennet Diaries with Hank Green, a modern vlog-style adaptation of Jane Austen's Pride and Prejudice which won YouTube's first primetime Emmy. His five-platform interactive re-imagination of Austen's Emma, called Emma Approved, won the same Emmy two years later. Su also worked on Vanity, was Multi-channel network StyleHaul's first original online series, with Maybelline New York attached as the exclusive sponsor for its centennial celebration.

Su's most recent project, Artificial, follows a young AI named Sophie as she learns what it means to be a human. It is the first web series to debut on the streaming service Twitch and was awarded a Primetime Emmy and Peabody Award in 2019.

== Career ==
=== Compulsions ===
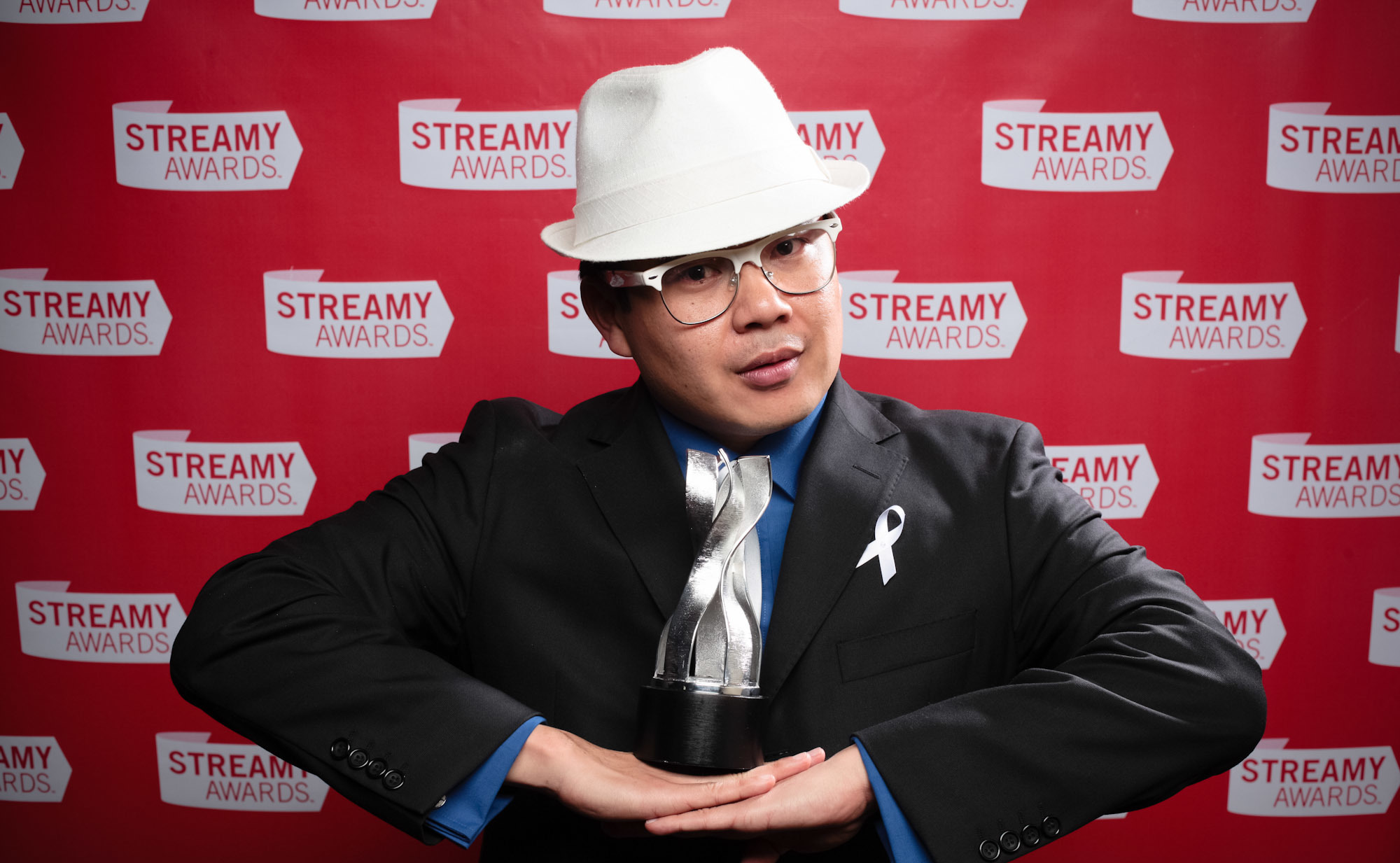
Su at the 2nd Streamy Awards in 2010

Compulsions is an American drama web series created by Su and directed by Nathan Atkinson. It debuted on Dailymotion on December 1, 2009 and was nominated for multiple Streamy Awards at the 2nd Streamy Awards the next year, including Best Drama Web Series, Best Directing for a Drama Web Series (Nathan Atkinson), and Best Male Actor in a Drama Web Series (Craig Frank). Su won the award for Best Writing for a Drama Web Series at the ceremony for writing the show.

=== The Lizzie Bennet Diaries and Pemberley Digital ===
The Lizzie Bennet Diaries is an American web series adapted from Jane Austen's Pride and Prejudice. The story is conveyed in the form of vlogs. It was created by Hank Green and Bernie Su, produced by Jenni Powell and stars Ashley Clements, Mary Kate Wiles, Laura Spencer, Julia Cho and Daniel Vincent Gordh. It premiered on YouTube on April 9, 2012 and concluded when the 100th episode was posted on March 28, 2013. The story is told in vlog-style by the eponymous character, each episode being between two and eight minutes long.

In 2013, The Lizzie Bennet Diaries won YouTube’s first primetime Emmy. The Guardian called The Lizzie Bennet Diaries "the best Austen adaptation around" at the 200th anniversary of Pride and Prejudice. In 2014, The Lizzie Bennet Diaries YouTube Channel was listed on New Media Rockstars Top 100 Channels, ranked at #40.

A DVD set containing every episode of the series and its spinoffs was launched on Kickstarter on March 22, 2013; the initial pledge goal of $60,000 was met within six hours.

=== Sequels ===
==== Welcome to Sanditon ====
Taking place after the events of The Lizzie Bennet Diaries, Welcome to Sanditon follows Gigi Darcy as she spends her summer in Sanditon, CA to run a beta demo of the Pemberley Digital Domino application. The residents of Sanditon have all been invited to join in the test, and discover how this “life-revealing” app performs.

The mini-series is a modernized adaptation of Jane Austen's unfinished novel, Sanditon. One notable difference from the source material is Gigi replaces the unfinished novel's original heroine, Charlotte Heywood (as Sanditon is actually not connected to Pride and Prejudice in any way).

==== Emma Approved ====
Taking place after the events of Welcome to Sanditon, Emma Approved focuses on Emma Woodhouse, a confident and proud female entrepreneur who believes she is an excellent matchmaker.

The series is a modernized adaptation of Jane Austen's novel, Emma. One notable difference from the source material is Caroline Lee replaces Augusta Hawkins as Philip Elton's wife (as Emma is actually not connected to Pride and Prejudice in any way).

The Secret Diary of Lizzie Bennet

The Secret Diary of Lizzie Bennet is a book by Bernie Su and Kate Rorick which takes readers deep inside Lizzie’s world and well beyond the confines of her camera.

=== Artificial ===
Artificial, also referred to as ArtificialNext, is the first ever scripted and interactive show distributed on Twitch. Created by Bernie Su and Evan Mandery, Artificial follows Dr. Matt Lin (Tohoru Masamune) and his artificial intelligence creation/daughter Sophie (Tiffany Chu). Dr. Lin socializes Sophie with the live and interactive Twitch audience in order to help her become human. Episodes are broken into recorded and live scenes. In the live scenes, the audience directly influences the story, and, through in-stream polls and comments, helps the characters make decisions. The first season ran weekly from August 12, 2018 through October 25, 2018 for a total of sixteen episodes and accrued more than two million views. The second season began on March 6, 2019, and will conclude on August 28. In 2019, he series was awarded the Peabody Futures of Media Award for Webisode. The series additionally has a spinoff podcast, Artificial Uncovered, an in-universe transmedia video podcast that airs as two livestreams with one of the show's two hosts providing commentary and taking questions on a pre-recorded podcast with both hosts. The audio of the pre-recorded segments is also posted for download.

== Awards and nominations ==
Year	Award	Category	Nominated Work	Result
2010	2nd Streamy Awards	Best Drama Web Series	Compulsions	Nominated
2010	2nd Streamy Awards	Best Writing for a Drama Web Series	Compulsions	Won
2013	3rd Streamy Awards	Best Writing: Comedy	The Lizzie Bennet Diaries	Won
2013	3rd Streamy Awards	Best Comedy Series	The Lizzie Bennet Diaries	Nominated
2013	3rd Streamy Awards	Best Interactive Program	The Lizzie Bennet Diaries	Won
2013	3rd Streamy Awards	Audience Choice for Series of the Year	The Lizzie Bennet Diaries	Nominated
2013	65th Primetime Creative Arts Emmy Awards	Outstanding Creative Achievement In Interactive Media - Original Interactive Program	The Lizzie Bennet Diaries	Won
2013	2nd International Academy of Web Television Awards	Best Interactive/Social Media Experience	The Lizzie Bennet Diaries	Won
2014	4th Streamy Awards	Best Drama Series	The Lizzie Bennet Diaries	Won
2014	4th Streamy Awards	Audience Choice	Emma Approved	Finalist
2014	Cynopsis Digital Model D Awards	Web Series Comedy	Emma Approved	Nominated
2014	3rd International Academy of Web Television Awards	Best Comedy Series	Emma Approved	Nominated
2015	67th Primetime Creative Arts Emmy Awards	Outstanding Creative Achievement In Interactive Media - Original Interactive Program	Emma Approved	Won
2016	43rd Daytime Emmy Awards	Outstanding Digital Drama Series	Vanity	Nominated
2019	Peabody Award	Futures of Media Award: Webisode	Artificial	Won
2019	71st Primetime Emmy Awards	Outstanding Innovation in Interactive Media	Artificial	Won
