= Valemont =

Television series

- Written by: Christian Taylor
- Directed by: Stefan Scaini
- Starring: Kristen Hager; Eric Balfour; Nikki Blonsky; Jessica Parker Kennedy; Dillon Casey
- Country of origin: United States
- No. of episodes: 35

Production
- Running time: 2½ minutes

Original release
- Network: MTV; MTV.com; V Cast Video
- Release: September 29 – October 6, 2009

Valemont is an American supernatural drama web series premiered on MTV on September 21, 2009. Two episodes premiered on Tuesdays during The Hills and The City. For six consecutive weeks, two and a half minute episodes of Valemont premiered in the commercial breaks directly preceding The Hills and following The City. The concluding 23 episodes of the series (35 episodes in total for season 1) were made available online at MTV.com and on V Cast Video from Verizon Wireless, along with other bonus footage.

== Description ==
The show follows Maggie Gracen (Kristen Hager), who after visiting the morgue to help identify the supposed burnt body of her brother Eric (Eric Balfour), decides to infiltrate Valemont University, an exclusive, historic and secretive college in rural Massachusetts from where some of the world’s greatest leaders have graduated, that her brother attended before disappearing mysteriously. Taking the identity of Sophie Fields (a student who turned down her acceptance to Valemont University due to pregnancy) so that her real identity will not be discovered, she delves deeper into the mystery of her brother's disappearance. On the surface Valemont is like any other University but something is different, something is strange, especially with the students. Some students are smart, some are athletic, some are strong, and some are vampires. Each episode begins with a video clip or text message from Eric's mobile device. The phones provide viewers with clues to characters in the show, and through an online gaming experience at ValemontU.com. In addition, a five second Verizon Wireless billboard will close each new episode of Valemont, driving to additional exclusive content on V CAST. The show also features music from Irish rock band Fight Like Apes.

== Episodes ==
Episode	Summary	Original air date
1	Maggie Gracen finds out that her brother was burned alive, and travels to a morgue where she sees her brother's burnt, black body covered in ashes. She steals his cell phone from the morgue and flees to her brother's old school, Valemont University as Sophie.	September 29, 2009
2	At Valemont University, Sophie meets her roommate, Poppy, and meets with Professor Blunt, one of the teachers at Valemont. Poppy introduces Sophie to the Panthera House, Valemont's version of the Greek system, which her brother was a part of. She also meets Sebastian, a dark, sinister stud who she thinks, can tell her about her brother's disappearance.	September 29, 2009
3	Sophie gets caught breaking into the Panthera House, where the residents decide to "have some fun with her" until Sebastian comes in, trying to save her. After trying to choke the head master, Sebastian says that there is nothing that he can do and the residents strip her, put her in a mouse costume, and write "CAT FOOD" on her stomach in marker.	October 6, 2009
4	Sophie goes into the bathroom to wipe off the marker, but she has a hallucination where blood starts coming out of her ribs and on the mirror, written in blood is the word, "Desmodus". When she wakes up from the hallucination, she meets Gabriel, who knew her brother. Gabriel asks her why she has a dead man's phone, to which she has no reply.	October 6, 2009

== DVD releases ==
The whole of series 1 was released in the UK on 1 Nov 2010, on a 2 Disc R2 DVD.

== See also ==
- Vampire film
- List of vampire television series
