= Green Porno =

2008 film by Isabella Rossellini

- Promotional photo from the Housefly episode of Green Porno
- Directed by: Jody Shapiro; Isabella Rossellini
- Written by: Isabella Rossellini
- Produced by: Rick Gilbert; Jody Shapiro; Isabella Rossellini
- Starring: Isabella Rossellini
- Edited by: Stacey Foster; Cynthia Madansky; Angelika Brudniak
- Music by: Andy Byers; Rick Gilbert
- Release date: 2008
- Language: English

Green Porno is a series of short films on animal sexual behaviour. The series, which began in 2008 and aired on The Sundance Channel, is conceived, written, and directed by its star, Isabella Rossellini.

In the eight films that comprise the first season, Rossellini enacts the mating rituals of various insects and other animals (including the dragonfly, spider, bee, praying mantis, earthworm, snail and housefly) with cardboard cut-outs and foam-rubber sculptures. Season two is devoted to marine life. Season three deals with ocean life threatened by commercial fishing.

== Origins ==
According to Rossellini, the idea for Green Porno stemmed from her relationships with both Robert Redford and his Sundance Channel. Rossellini had previously worked with Sundance on a previous short film My Dad Is 100 Years Old. Redford believed that the internet and the burgeoning mobile internet, allowed for the "re-launch of the short film format."

The Sundance Channel set aside an experimental budget and proposed that Rossellini's project should fall into the purview of Sundance's program The Green. Rossellini's love of animals and desire to balance out the current projects focusing on home and food with the animals that “surround us every day” yet have an “incredible variety of mating, which is very scandalous.”

== Concept and growth ==
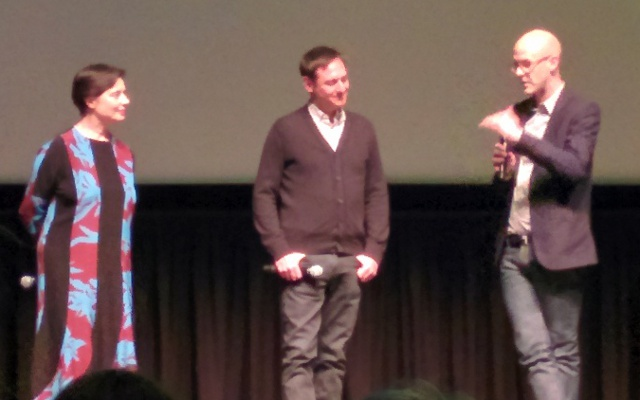
Isabella Rossellini (left) with Jody Shapiro (center) and Andy Byers (right) at the Sundance Kabuki

Rossellini says that she does a great deal of research before each episode, then spends a while determining how to translate that research into "something visual and how to make it comical."
The goal, according to Rossellini, is to be both entertaining and educational.

Jody Shapiro and Rick Gilbert are responsible for translating the research and concepts that Rossellini has into the paper and paste costumes which directly contribute to the series' unique visual style. After the costumes are designed, approximately one animal is filmed per day, for a total production time of about ten months per season.

Over the course of Green Porno's three seasons, the focus of the show has shifted. Season one dealt exclusively with invertebrates that humans can realistically encounter on a daily basis. The second season focused on sea creatures, but also included an episode on the sexual organs. For the third and shortest season, Green Porno adopted an overt environmental theme, specifically one which focused on the issue of over-fishing as contrasted with the mating habits of animals commonly used as food. In season three, Rossellini is joined by biologist Claudio Campagna.

== Multimedia expansion ==
With the third season, Sundance Channel embarked on a Green Porno multimedia push. All four episodes of the season premiered at the Toronto Film Festival on Friday, September 11, 2009. On September 14, 2009 the series premiered on the Sundance Channel's website, and September 21, 2009 saw the broadcast television premier. Green Porno: A Book and Short Films (HarperStudio – 2009) was released in September 2009, eight days after the internet premier of web series' third season. The book served as a supplement to the series and included full color photos, backstage footage shot by her nephew Tommaso Rossellini, and a DVD with all three seasons worth of Green Porno short films.

=== Sequel series ===
Bon Appetit was the theme of the third season of Green Porno, looking into the reproductive behavior of sea creatures that are part of the food industry, and the environmentally unsound practices involved in the fisheries. Seduce Me was called the "spawn" of Green Porno, and featured several short films on the various courtship displays and mating behavior of a wider range of animals. Rossellini also worked with Burt's Bees in a short series called "Burt Talks to the Bees" discussing the biology and behavior of honey bees as well as colony collapse disorder. In 2013, a third series titled Mammas looks at the various levels of parental investment mother animals give to their offspring, appropriately released on Mother's Day.

Rossellini also filmed a special for the Discovery Channel titled Animals Distract Me in the style of her Green Porno and other videos, describing the nature of the various animals in everyday life.

== Supporting cast ==
The Male Bees are played by Roberto Rossellini, Dallas Giorgi, and Louis Giacobetti. The part of the Baby Bee Larva is played by Ona Grandey.

== Awards and Media references ==
- 2009 Webby – Online Film and Video – Best Individual Performance – Isabella Rossellini
- 2009 Webby – Online Film and Video – Experimental – Green Porno

The series was mentioned by Stephen Colbert on The Colbert Report on 12 May 2008. It was also mentioned by Graham Norton on The Graham Norton Show (which airs on BBC America) on 31 May 2009. Clips from the Green Porno segments on ducks and on bedbugs appeared as "Kick-Ass Clip of the Week" on the 7 May 2010 episode of The Soup as well as in an installment in their occasional series The Soup Presents. The segment on bedbugs was mentioned by Jon Stewart on The Daily Show with Jon Stewart on 24 August 2010.

Several of the films were displayed at the Cleveland Museum of Natural History's temporary large exhibit on animal reproduction in early 2014, and at the Naturalis Biodiversity Center's permanent exhibit on Animal and Plant Seduction in July 2022.

The series is mentioned in the book Nature's Nether Regions by Menno Schilthuizen.
