= Ronald Hughes =

American lawyer who represented Leslie Van Houten

- Born: Ronald William Hughes; March 16, 1935
- Died: December 2, 1970 (aged 35); Ventura County, California, United States
- Resting place: Westwood Village Memorial Park Cemetery, Los Angeles, California, U.S.
- Occupation: Attorney

Ronald William Hughes (March 16, 1935 – December 2, 1970) was an American attorney who represented Leslie Van Houten, a member of the Manson Family. Hughes disappeared while on a camping trip during a ten-day recess from the Tate-LaBianca murder trial in November 1970. His body was found in March 1971, but his cause of death could not be determined. At least one Manson Family member has claimed that Hughes was murdered by the family in an act of retaliation. No one has been charged in connection with his death.

== Tate–LaBianca murder trial ==
Ronald Hughes was among the first lawyers to meet with Charles Manson in December 1969. Initially he signed on as the attorney for Manson, but was replaced by Irving Kanarek two weeks before the start of the trial.

Hughes eventually represented Leslie Van Houten in the Tate–LaBianca murder trial. He had failed the bar exam three times before passing and had never tried a case. Hughes, a onetime conservative, was called "the hippie lawyer" due to his intimate knowledge of the hippie subculture. That knowledge occasionally served his client well; he was able to raise questions about Linda Kasabian's credibility by asking her about hallucinogenic drugs, her belief in ESP, her thoughts that she might be a witch and her experiencing "vibrations" from Manson.

As attorney for defendant Van Houten, Hughes tried to separate the interests of his client from those of Manson, a move that angered Manson and may have cost Hughes his life. He hoped to show that Van Houten was not acting independently, but was completely controlled in her actions by Manson. This strategy contradicted Manson's plan to allow fellow family members to implicate themselves in the crimes, clearing him of all involvement.

Twenty-two weeks into the trial, which included outbursts and bizarre behavior from Manson and his co-defendants, the prosecution rested. Lawyers for the defendants stunned the courtroom by announcing that the defense also rested. Van Houten, Susan Atkins and Patricia Krenwinkel immediately shouted that they wanted to testify. Per Manson's instructions, the women said that they wanted to testify to committing the murders on their own and that Manson had nothing to do with the crimes. Hughes objected and stood up against Manson's ploy, stating, "I refuse to take part in any proceeding where I am forced to push a client out the window." After Manson made a statement to the court, however, he then told the women that they no longer had to testify. Judge Charles Older then ordered a ten-day recess to allow the attorneys to prepare for their final arguments. Hughes later told a reporter that he was confident that he could secure an acquittal for Van Houten.

== Disappearance ==
On November 27, 1970, Hughes embarked on a camping trip to a remote area near Sespe Hot Springs in Ventura County, California. According to James Forsher and Lauren Elder, two friends who accompanied Hughes on the trip, heavy rains which had caused flash floods in the area had mired their Volkswagen in mud. Forsher and Elder hitchhiked their way out, while Hughes decided to stay in the area until November 29. As the rains continued, the wilderness area was evacuated. Hughes was last seen by three campers on the morning of November 28. They later told investigators that Hughes was alone at the time and had briefly stopped to talk with them. Hughes also appeared to be unharmed and was in an area that was away from flood waters. When court reconvened on November 30, Hughes failed to appear. Due to continued rainstorms, the Ventura County sheriff had to wait two days before a search was launched.

On December 2, Judge Older ordered the trial to proceed and appointed a new attorney, Maxwell Keith, for Van Houten. The women angrily demanded the firing of all their lawyers, and asked to reopen the defense. Judge Older denied the request. By week's end, Hughes had been missing for two weeks. When the court reconvened, Manson and the women created a disturbance suggesting that Judge Older "did away with Ronald Hughes," which resulted in their being removed again from the courtroom.

== Death ==
Over the following months, police conducted more than a dozen searches of the area where Hughes was last seen. After receiving an anonymous tip in March 1971, police also searched in the area surrounding the Barker Ranch in Inyo County where Manson and his associates had previously lived.

On March 29, 1971, the same day the jury returned death penalty verdicts against all the defendants on all counts, Hughes' severely decomposed body was discovered by two fishermen in Ventura County. His body was found wedged between two boulders in a gorge. Hughes was later positively identified by dental X-rays. Due to the severe decomposition of his body, the cause and nature of his death was ruled as 'Undetermined'.

Hughes' funeral was held on April 7, 1971 in West Los Angeles. He is buried in Westwood Village Memorial Park Cemetery in Los Angeles.

== Aftermath ==
In his book Helter Skelter, Vincent Bugliosi wrote that Sandra Good, an associate of Manson and a close friend of devoted Manson family member Lynette "Squeaky" Fromme, claimed that Manson family members had killed "35 to 40 people" and that, "Hughes was the first of the retaliation murders." In the afterword to the 25th anniversary edition of the book, Bugliosi also said that he received a call in 1976 from a former member of the Manson family, "understandably wanting to remain anonymous," who also claimed that Hughes had been murdered by the family. Attorney Stephen Kay, who helped Bugliosi prosecute members of the family, stated that while he is "on the fence" about the family's involvement in Hughes' death, Manson had open contempt for Hughes during the trial. Kay added, "The last thing Manson said to him [Hughes] was, 'I don't want to see you in the courtroom again,' and he was never seen again alive [in the courtroom]."

Retired Ventura County sheriff Charlie Rudd, who was assigned to investigate Hughes' disappearance, stated that he felt Hughes' death was accidental because there were no signs of foul play. Rudd believes that Hughes was stranded by the rainstorm that had caused the creek to swell. He believes that Hughes drowned or was knocked unconscious and killed by rocks and debris as he was swept away by the water. Musician and author Ed Sanders, who was a friend of Hughes, wrote about his death in his 1971 book The Family. He stated therein that his death was due to accidental drowning.

In 1976, Van Houten was granted a new trial on the grounds that she was denied proper legal representation after Hughes disappeared before the closing arguments. Her retrial in 1977 ended in a hung jury. She was released from jail after posting $200,000 bond and retried in 1978. In her third trial, Van Houten was convicted of the first-degree murders of Leno and Rosemary LaBianca and conspiracy in connection with the Tate murders. She was sentenced to seven years to life in prison.

== See also ==
- List of solved missing person cases: 1950–1999
- List of unsolved murders (1900–1979)

== Footnotes ==
=== Sources ===
- Bugliosi, Vincent; Gentry, Curt (1994) [1974]. Helter Skelter: The True Story of the Manson Murders. W. W. Norton. ISBN 0-393-32223-8.
- Sanders, Ed (2002). The Family. Da Capo Press. ISBN 1-560-25396-7.
