= List of Emma Approved episodes =

Emma Approved is an American web series told in a vlog format created by Bernie Su, based on the novel Emma by Jane Austen. While the show is a follow-up to The Lizzie Bennet Diaries, it stands on its own. The series premiered on YouTube on October 7, 2013 and concluded on August 23, 2014. It starred Joanna Sotomura, Brent Bailey and Dayeanne Hutton.

In addition to the 72 regular episodes there were 24 other videos complementing the narrative such as 6 Q&As with the characters, 8 Harriet videos (including 1 bonus featuring fans of the show) and more, which brings the total of episodes in the series to 96.

== Episode list ==
=== Annie Taylor ===
No.	Title	Directed by	Written by	Length	Original release date
1	"I am Emma Woodhouse"	Bernie Su	Bernie Su	04:24	7 October 2013
2	"Imminent Success"	Bernie Su	Bernie Su	04:01	10 October 2013
3	"Self Sufficient"	Bernie Su	Bernie Su	06:08	14 October 2013
H1	"Harriet’s Application Video"	Bernie Su	Kate and Angelique Hanus	01:52	14 October 2013
4	"The Right Decision"	Bernie Su	Bernie Su	06:40	17 October 2013
5	"Do What’s Best"	Bernie Su	Bernie Su	05:09	21 October 2013
6	"Let’s Be Frank"	Bernie Su	Bernie Su	05:13	24 October 2013
7	"What Really Matters"	Bernie Su	Bernie Su	06:51	28 October 2013
8	"Being a Good Friend"	Bernie Su	Bernie Su	04:15	31 October 2013
9	"A Worthy Subject"	Bernie Su	Tracy Bitterolf	04:21	4 November 2013

=== Harriet Smith ===
No.	Title	Directed by	Written by	Length	Original release date
10	"Wind in the Sails"	Bernie Su	Tracy Bitterolf	05:23	7 November 2013
11	"Underwhelmed"	Bernie Su	Tracy Bitterolf	04:39	11 November 2013
12	"The Rooster Obstacle"	Bernie Su	Tracy Bitterolf	05:59	14 November 2013
QA1	"QA1 with Snarky Knightley"	Bernie Su	Tracy Bitterolf	03:27	16 November 2013
13	"Tweetception"	Bernie Su	Tracy Bitterolf	04:04	18 November 2013
14	"Hashtag Miracle Worker"	Bernie Su	Tracy Bitterolf	02:48	21 November 2013
M1	"Martin’s Crane Video"	Bernie Su	Tracy Bitterolf	01:15	21 November 2013
15	"Ambition & Fruition"	Bernie Su	Tracy Bitterolf	04:29	25 November 2013
16	"Giving Thanks"	Bernie Su	Tracy Bitterolf	06:17	28 November 2013

=== James Elton ===
No.	Title	Directed by	Written by	Length	Original release date
17	"First Impressions"	Bernie Su	Margaret Dunlap	04:47	2 December 2013
18	"Practice Date"	Bernie Su	Margaret Dunlap	07:02	5 December 2013
19	"The Proof is in the Yogurt"	Bernie Su	Kate Rorick	05:21	9 December 2013
20	"For a Very Special Lady"	Bernie Su	Kate Rorick	06:29	12 December 2013
QA2	"QA2"	Bernie Su	Kate Rorick	03:30	14 December 2013
21	"Fine Tuning"	Bernie Su	Kate Rorick	05:21	16 December 2013
H2	"Harriet Sings Picture Perfect"	Bernie Su	Music and Lyrics by Sally Chou	01:03	16 December 2013
22	"Planning Perfection"	Bernie Su	Margaret Dunlap	03:58	19 December 2013
23	"Moment of Triumph"	Bernie Su	Kate Rorick	06:58	23 December 2013
24	"Vingt-et-un"	Bernie Su	Margaret Dunlap	05:32	26 December 2013
25	"Should Have Listened"	Bernie Su	Bernie Su	06:10	3 February 2014
26	"New Direction"	Bernie Su	Bernie Su	06:26	6 February 2014
27	"The Need to Help"	Bernie Su	Bernie Su	07:12	10 February 2014
28	"Sister Attack"	Bernie Su	Bernie Su	05:52	13 February 2014

=== Izzy Knightley ===
No.	Title	Directed by	Written by	Length	Original release date
29	"Change of Plans"	Bernie Su	Bernie Su	07:29	17 February 2014
30	"Winners and Losers"	Bernie Su	Bernie Su	03:40	20 February 2014
31	"Listening, Again"	Bernie Su	Bernie Su	06:33	24 February 2014
32	"Listening, Again"	Bernie Su	Bernie Su	04:08	27 February 2014
H3	"Harriet’s First Song"	Bernie Su	Music and Lyrics by Sally Chou	02:10	27 February 2014
Harriet’s Music Club first video.
33	"Back in the Saddle"	Shilpi Roy	Tracy Bitterolf	04:29	3 March 2014
34	"Attitude and Gratitude"	Shilpi Roy	Tracy Bitterolf	07:19	6 March 2014
QA3	"QA3"	Shilpi Roy	Tracy Bitterolf	02:29	8 March 2014

=== Maddy Bates ===
No.	Title	Directed by	Written by	Length	Original release date
35	"Flies to Honey"	Shilpi Roy	Tracy Bitterolf	05:45	10 March 2014
36	"Internal Troubles"	Shilpi Roy	Tracy Bitterolf	06:58	13 March 2014
37	"Cinderella in the Making"	Shilpi Roy	Tracy Bitterolf	05:28	17 March 2014
38	"Surprise, Surprise"	Shilpi Roy	Tracy Bitterolf	05:43	20 March 2014
39	"Benefiting the Greater Good"	Shilpi Roy	Tracy Bitterolf	05:28	24 March 2014
40	"Two for Two"	Shilpi Roy	Tracy Bitterolf	06:38	27 March 2014
H4	"Maybe I Can"	Bernie Su	Music and Lyrics by Sally Chou	02:34	29 March 2014
Harriet’s Music Club second video.
41	"Karma is…"	Bernie Su	Ana Avila	04:15	31 March 2014
42	"No, No and No"	Bernie Su	Ana Avila	06:06	3 April 2014

=== Caroline Lee ===
No.	Title	Directed by	Written by	Length	Original release date
43	"To New Heights"	Bernie Su	Tracy Bitterolf	07:14	7 April 2014
44	"A Little Too Familiar"	Bernie Su	Tracy Bitterolf	07:03	10 April 2014
45	"Mirror, Mirror"	Bernie Su	Angelique Hanus	05:24	14 April 2014
46	"Cruel Intentions"	Bernie Su	Angelique Hanus	06:32	17 April 2014
47	"Plus One, Minus One"	Bernie Su	Bernie Su	04:41	21 April 2014
48	"Doppelgangers"	Bernie Su	Bernie Su	06:07	24 April 2014
H5	"Breathe and Believe"	Bernie Su	Music and Lyrics by Sally Chou	03:16	3 May 2014
Harriet’s Music Club third video.
QA4	"QA4"	Bernie Su	Unknown	01:46	17 May 2014
QA5	"QA5"	Bernie Su	Bernie Su	03:11	31 May 2014
49	"The New Girl"	Bernie Su	Shawna Benson & Julie Benson	05:44	2 June 2014

=== Bachelor Auction ===
No.	Title	Directed by	Written by	Length	Original release date
50	"The Bachelor"	Bernie Su	Shawna Benson & Julie Benson	06:06	5 June 2014
51	"Project Runway"	Bernie Su	Angelique Hanus	04:19	9 June 2014
52	"True Detective"	Bernie Su	Angelique Hanus	04:43	12 June 2014
53	"Gossip Girl"	Bernie Su	Ana Avila	05:36	16 June 2014
54	"The Dating Game"	Bernie Su	Ana Avila	04:46	19 June 2014
55	"Mythbusters"	Bernie Su	Tracy Bitterolf	06:12	23 June 2014
56	"Psych"	Bernie Su	Tracy Bitterolf	05:50	26 June 2014
57	"Babies and Bids"	Bernie Su	Tracy Bitterolf	06:40	30 June 2014

=== Boxx Hill ===
No.	Title	Directed by	Written by	Length	Original release date
58	"Ship Shape"	Bernie Su	Shawna Benson & Julie Benson	06:04	3 July 2014
59	"Car Crush"	Bernie Su	Angelique Hanus	05:19	7 July 2014
H6	"Behind the Scenes"	Bernie Su	Music and Lyrics by Sally Chou	03:22	9 July 2014
Harriet’s Music Club fourth video.
60	"Out of the Bag"	Bernie Su	Angelique Hanus	04:44	10 July 2014
QA6	"QA6"	Bernie Su	Bernie Su	03:12	12 July 2014
61	"The Usual Suspects"	Bernie Su	Shawna Benson & Julie Benson	04:59	14 July 2014
62	"Baby Bump"	Bernie Su	Shawna Benson & Julie Benson	06:11	17 July 2014
63	"Mood Swings"	Bernie Su	Ana Avila	04:28	21 July 2014
64	"Boxx Hill"	Bernie Su	Tracy Bitterolf	05:35	24 July 2014

=== Emma ===
No.	Title	Directed by	Written by	Length	Original release date
65	"Big Girls Don’t Cry"	Tracy Bitterolf	Shawna Benson & Julie Benson	07:06	28 July 2014
66	"All Apologies"	Tracy Bitterolf	Shawna Benson & Julie Benson	06:13	31 July 2014
67	"Secret Lovers"	Tracy Bitterolf	Ana Avila	06:56	4 August 2014

==== Frank and Jane ====
These episodes take place in between previous episodes but it wasn’t until later that they were posted on YouTube, reflecting the time Emma finds out about Frank and Jane.

No.	Title	Directed by	Written by	Length	Original release date
FJ1	"Frank and Jane Ep: 1"	Tracy Bitterolf	Angelique Hanus and Ana Avila	01:54	6 August 2014
This episode takes place right after episode 50.
FJ2	"Frank and Jane Ep: 2"	Tracy Bitterolf	Angelique Hanus and Ana Avila	01:12	6 August 2014
This episode takes place between the previous one and episode 51. The official Pemberley Digital website dated its events June 7, 2014.
FJ3	"Frank and Jane Ep: 3"	Tracy Bitterolf	Angelique Hanus and Ana Avila	01:46	6 August 2014
This episode takes place right after episode 53.
FJ4	"Frank and Jane Ep: 4"	Tracy Bitterolf	Angelique Hanus and Ana Avila	01:52	6 August 2014
This episode takes place after episode 55. The official website dated its events June 25, 2014.
FJ5	"Frank and Jane Ep: 5"	Tracy Bitterolf	Angelique Hanus and Ana Avila	02:10	6 August 2014
This episode takes place right before episode 56.
FJ6	"Frank and Jane Ep: 6"	Tracy Bitterolf	Angelique Hanus and Ana Avila	01:41	6 August 2014
This episode takes place between episodes 58 and 59. The official website dated its events July 6, 2014.
FJ7	"Frank and Jane Ep: 7"	Tracy Bitterolf	Angelique Hanus and Ana Avila	01:22	6 August 2014
This episode takes place right after episode 60.
FJ8	"Frank and Jane Ep: 8"	Tracy Bitterolf	Angelique Hanus and Ana Avila	01:39	6 August 2014
This episode takes place between episodes 61 and 62. The official website dated its events July 15, 2014.
FJ9	"Frank and Jane Ep: 9"	Angelique Hanus	Angelique Hanus and Ana Avila	01:42	6 August 2014
This episode takes place right before episode 63.

==== Back to Emma ====
No.	Title	Directed by	Written by	Length	Original release date
68	"The Boy is Mine"	Tracy Bitterolf	Tamara Krinsky & Alexandra Edwards	06:20	7 August 2014
69	"Strange Days"	Bernie Su	Tamara Krinsky & Alexandra Edwards	06:48	11 August 2014
70	"At Last"	Bernie Su	Tracy Bitterolf	07:48	14 August 2014
71	"A Little Less Conversation"	Bernie Su	Ana Avila	07:00	18 August 2014
72	"After All"	Bernie Su	Tracy Bitterolf	08:30	21 August 2014
H7	"A Smile On Every Day"	Tracy Bitterolf	Music and Lyrics by Sally Chou	04:40	23 August 2014
Harriet’s Music Club final video.
