= List of The Lizzie Bennet Diaries episodes =

The Lizzie Bennet Diaries is an American web series in the style of video blogging created by Hank Green and Bernie Su, based on the novel Pride and Prejudice by Jane Austen. The series premiered on YouTube on April 9, 2012, and concluded with its 100th episode on March 28, 2013. It starred Ashley Clements, Mary Kate Wiles, Laura Spencer, Julia Cho and Daniel Vincent Gordh.

Aside from Lizzie's 100 regular episodes and 10 Q&As videos, over the series' run other characters made their own vlogs, complementing the plot. Lydia's videos make up 34 episodes (including Q&A and special videos) found on her own channel, The Lydia Bennet; Maria Lu shares her experiences at work with her older sister Charlotte in 7 episodes at Maria of the Lu; Mr. Collins posts 8 instructional videos from his company at Collins and Collins; and Gigi Darcy uploaded 6 episodes, found on the Pemberley Digital channel. This brings the total of episodes to 165.

== Episode list ==
=== My name is Lizzie Bennet ===
No.	Title	Directed by	Written by	Length	Original release date
1	"My Name is Lizzie Bennet"	Bernie Su	Bernie Su & Hank Green	03:20	9 April 2012
2	"My Sisters: Problematic to Practically Perfect"	Bernie Su	Rachel Kiley	03:36	12 April 2012
3	"My Parents: Opposingly Supportive"	Bernie Su	Margaret Dunlap	03:11	16 April 2012
4	"Bing Lee and His 500 Teenage Prostitutes"	Bernie Su	Rachel Kiley	03:22	19 April 2012
5	"After the Wedding: The Real Bing Lee"	Bernie Su	Rachel Kiley	03:11	23 April 2012
6	"Snobby Mr. Douchey"	Bernie Su	Rachel Kiley	02:53	26 April 2012
7	"The Most Awkward Dance Ever"	Bernie Su	Bernie Su	03:08	30 April 2012
8	"Charlotte's Back!"	Bernie Su	Margaret Dunlap	02:45	3 May 2012
?1	"Questions and Answers #1 (ft. Lydia Bennet)"	Bernie Su	Bernie Su	03:59	5 May 2012
9	"Single and Happyish"	Bernie Su	Daryn Strauss	02:43	7 May 2012
10	"Cats and Chinchillas"	Bernie Su	Margaret Dunlap	02:50	10 May 2012
11	"The Charming Mr. Lee"	Bernie Su	Margaret Dunlap	02:42	14 May 2012
12	"Jane Chimes In"	Bernie Su	Margaret Dunlap	03:48	17 May 2012
13	"Bing! It's Time for Dinner"	Bernie Su	Bernie Su	03:08	21 May 2012
14	"I Really Suck at Video Games"	Bernie Su	Rachel Kiley	03:17	24 May 2012
15	"Lizzie Bennet is in Denial"	Bernie Su	Rachel Kiley	03:42	28 May 2012
16	"Happiness in the Pursuit of Life"	Bernie Su	Bernie Su	04:06	31 May 2012
17	"Swimming with Scissors"	Bernie Su	Bernie Su	03:24	4 June 2012
18	"25 Douchebags and a Gentleman"	Bernie Su	Anne Toole	04:24	7 June 2012
19	"The Green Bean Gelatin Plan"	Bernie Su	Margaret Dunlap	04:39	11 June 2012
20	"Enjoy the Adorbs"	Bernie Su	Margaret Dunlap	04:20	14 June 2012
21	"The Semester is Over"	Bernie Su	Margaret Dunlap	04:44	18 June 2012
22	"The Unavoidable Invittion"	Bernie Su	Margaret Dunlap	03:34	21 June 2012
?2	"Questions and Answers #2 (ft. Charlotte Lu)"	Bernie Su	Margaret Dunlap	03:11	23 June 2012
23	"One Sister Behind"	Bernie Su	Bernie Su	04:33	25 June 2012
24	"Jane's Back and Mom Isn't Happy"	Bernie Su	Bernie Su	03:20	28 June 2012

=== Vidcon ===
No.	Title	Directed by	Written by	Length	Original release date
25	"Vidcon Interruption"	Bernie Su	Bernie Su	03:14	2 July 2012
26	"Mom's Convoluted Plan"	Bernie Su	Bernie Su	03:34	5 July 2012

=== Netherfield ===
No.	Title	Directed by	Written by	Length	Original release date
27	"Welcome to Netherfield"	Bernie Su	Bernie Su	04:04	9 July 2012
28	"Meeting Bing Lee"	Bernie Su	Margaret Dunlap	04:03	12 July 2012
L1	"Boredom"	Bernie Su	Rachel Kiley	01:41	13 July 2012
29	"Ethics of Seeing Bing"	Bernie Su	Anne Toole	04:34	16 July 2012
L2	"About a Boy"	Bernie Su	Rachel Kiley	01:36	17 July 2012
30	"Ticking Clock"	Bernie Su	Anne Toole	04:37	19 July 2012
L3	"The Lodger"	Bernie Su	Rachel Kiley	01:59	20 July 2012
31	"Convertible Carpool"	Bernie Su	Margaret Dunlap	03:39	23 July 2012
L4	"Peer Pressure"	Bernie Su	Rachel Kiley	02:06	24 July 2012
32	"Turn About the Room"	Bernie Su	Bernie Su	04:21	26 July 2012
L5	"Babysitting"	Bernie Su	Rachel Kiley	01:55	27 July 2012
?3	"Question and Answers #3 (ft. Caroline Lee)"	Bernie Su	Bernie Su	02:52	28 July 2012
33	"Nope! He Doesn't Like Me!"	Bernie Su	Rachel Kiley	04:52	30 July 2012
L6	"Kitty Bennet"	Unknown	Unknown	01:06	31 July 2012
34	"Lizzie, Come Home"	Bernie Su	Bernie Su	05:13	2 August 2012
L7	"Going Home"	Bernie Su	Rachel Kiley	01:52	3 August 2012

=== Back home ===
No.	Title	Directed by	Written by	Length	Original release date
35	"Home Sweet Home"	Bernie Su	Kate Rorick	05:03	6 August 2012
36	"Mr. Collins Returns (Extended Edition)"	Bernie Su	Margaret Dunlap	05:49	11 August 2012
37	"Lydia vs Mr. Collins"	Bernie Su	Rachel Kiley	04:12	13 August 2012
38	"Tale of Two Gents"	Bernie Su	Kate Rorick	06:35	16 August 2012
39	"The Insistent Proposal"	Bernie Su	Anne Toole	05:19	20 August 2012
40	"Proposal Fallout"	Bernie Su	Margaret Dunlap	04:14	23 August 2012
?4	"Question and Answers #4"	Bernie Su	Bernie Su	03:11	25 August 2012
41	"Your Pitch Needs Work"	Bernie Su	Anne Toole	05:58	27 August 2012
42	"Friends Forever"	Bernie Su	Bernie Su	04:24	30 August 2012
43	"Missing Charlotte"	Bernie Su	Kate Rorick	05:19	13 September 2012
44	"Darcy Wickham Drama"	Bernie Su	Kate Rorick	04:33	6 September 2012
M1	"Intro to Vlogging - Maria Of The Lu"	Bernie Su	Margaret Dunlap	02:36	7 September 2012
45	"Wickham Story Time"	Bernie Su	Anne Toole	05:15	10 September 2012
M2	"What Are You Watching?"	Bernie Su	Margaret Dunlap	02:04	11 September 2012
46	"Birthday Party Battle Plan"	Bernie Su	Anne Toole	04:02	13 September 2012
M3	"Vlogging 2.0"	Bernie Su	Margaret Dunlap	01:32	14 September 2012
?5	"Question and Answers #5"	Bernie Su	Bernie Su	03:15	15 September 2012
47	"It's About Communicating"	Bernie Su	Rachel Kiley	04:05	17 September 2012
M4	"Editing Exercise"	Bernie Su	Margaret Dunlap	01:53	18 September 2012
48	"Snickerdoodles"	Bernie Su	Rachel Kiley	07:46	20 September 2012
M5	"Mentoring"	Bernie Su	Margaret Dunlap	01:55	21 September 2012
49	"Not Paranoid"	Bernie Su	Margaret Dunlap	05:19	13 September 2012
M6	"Employee Evaluation"	Bernie Su	Margaret Dunlap	02:06	25 September 2012
50	"Moving On"	Bernie Su	Margaret Dunlap	04:16	27 September 2012
M7	"Without Reservation"	Bernie Su	Margaret Dunlap	01:36	28 September 2012

=== Collins and Collins ===
No.	Title	Directed by	Written by	Length	Original release date
51	"Together Again"	Bernie Su	Margaret Dunlap	04:34	1 October 2012
52	"Better Living"	Bernie Su	Margaret Dunlap	03:39	4 October 2012
53	"Royal Dining"	Bernie Su	Rachel Kiley	04:29	8 October 2012
54	"Annie Kins"	Bernie Su	Rachel Kiley	05:24	11 October 2012
L8	"Miss Me Yet?"	Bernie Su	Rachel Kiley	01:40	12 October 2012
55	"Robot Surprise"	Bernie Su	Jay Bushman	04:52	15 October 2012
L9	"Study Break"	Bernie Su	Rachel Kiley	01:30	16 October 2012
56	"A New Buddy"	Bernie Su	Jay Bushman	05:35	18 October 2012
L10	"Ditching"	Bernie Su	Rachel Kiley	01:15	19 October 2012
?6	"Question and Answers #6"	Bernie Su	Bernie Su	03:58	20 October 2012
57	"Weirded Out"	Bernie Su	Anne Toole	03:53	22 October 2012
L11	"Girl Talk"	Bernie Su	Rachel Kiley	01:45	23 October 2012
58	"Care Packages"	Bernie Su	Anne Toole	05:00	25 October 2012
L12	"Life of the Party"	Bernie Su	Rachel Kiley	01:22	26 October 2012
L13	"Runaway"	Bernie Su	Rachel Kiley	01:37	30 October 2012
LH	"Halloween, Holla!!"	Bernie Su	Rachel Kiley	01:10	31 October 2012
59	"Staff Spirit"	Bernie Su	Kate Rorick	04:09	29 October 2012
60	"Are you Kidding Me!"	Bernie Su	Bernie Su & Hank Green	04:56	1 November 2012
L14	"The High Life"	Bernie Su	Rachel Kiley	02:46	2 November 2012
61	"Yeah I know"	Bernie Su	Kate Rorick	04:21	5 November 2012
L15	"Sister, Sister"	Bernie Su	Rachel Kiley	01:39	6 November 2012
L?1	"Answers from The Lydia Bennet"	Bernie Su	Rachel Kiley	01:39	7 November 2012
62	"Letter Analysis"	Bernie Su	Kate Rorick	04:26	8 November 2012
L16	"The D Word"	Bernie Su	Rachel Kiley	02:12	9 November 2012
?7	"Question and Answers #7 with Mr. Ricky Collins"	Bernie Su	Bernie Su	03:36	10 November 2012
63	"Unexpected Returns"	Bernie Su	Bernie Su	04:11	12 November 2012
L17	"There's Something About Mary"	Bernie Su	Rachel Kiley	01:32	13 November 2012
64	"C vs C"	Bernie Su	Rachel Kiley	06:11	15 November 2012
L18	"Friction"	Bernie Su	Rachel Kiley	01:43	16 November 2012
65	"Turkey Days"	Bernie Su	Margaret Dunlap	03:43	19 November 2012
L19	"Friends"	Bernie Su	Rachel Kiley	02:53	20 November 2012
L?2	"Answers from The Lydia Bennet #2"	Bernie Su	Rachel Kiley	02:53	21 November 2012
66	"Giving Thanks"	Bernie Su	Margaret Dunlap	03:54	22 November 2012
LT	"Totes Thanksgiving"	Bernie Su	Rachel Kiley	01:51	23 November 2012

=== Back home again ===
No.	Title	Directed by	Written by	Length	Original release date
67	"Back Home Again"	Margaret Dunlap	Margaret Dunlap	03:25	26 November 2012
68	"Leftovers"	Margaret Dunlap	Jay Bushman	04:28	29 November 2012
69	"Summer Friends"	Bernie Su	Anne Toole & Rachel Kiley	04:04	3 December 2012
70	"New Jane"	Bernie Su	Kate Rorick	05:01	6 December 2012
71	"Mr Bennet's Christmas Train Extravaganza"	Bernie Su	Kate Rorick	04:03	10 December 2012
72	"Party Time"	Bernie Su	Anne Toole & Kate Rorick	05:08	13 December 2012
73	"2 + 1"	Bernie Su	Rachel Kiley	05:20	17 December 2012
LDl	"Dear Lizzie"	Bernie Su	Rachel Kiley	01:34	19 December 2012
74	"How to Hold a Grudge"	Bernie Su	Rachel Kiley	03:41	20 December 2012
75	"Merry Christmas"	Margaret Dunlap	Anne Toole & Margaret Dunlap	03:10	24 December 2012
76	"Wishing Something Universal"	Bernie Su	Kate Rorick	04:29	27 December 2012
L20	"Vegas, Bitches!!"	Bernie Su	Rachel Kiley	01:03	28 December 2012
L21	"Midnight"	Bernie Su	Rachel Kiley	02:19	1 January 2013
L22	"Surprise!"	Bernie Su	Rachel Kiley	02:42	4 January 2013

=== Pemberley Digital ===
No.	Title	Directed by	Written by	Length	Original release date
77	"Tour Leader"	Bernie Su	Kate Rorick	06:13	7 January 2013
L23	"Mistakes"	Bernie Su	Rachel Kiley	02:21	8 January 2013
78	"The Lizzie Trap"	Bernie Su	Bernie Su	05:01	10 January 2013
L24	"Strangers"	Bernie Su	Rachel Kiley	03:34	11 January 2013
79	"The Unavoidable Mr. Lee"	Bernie Su	Margaret Dunlap	03:33	14 January 2013
L25	"Kicks"	Bernie Su	Rachel Kiley	02:25	15 January 2013
80	"Hyper-Mediation in New Media"	Bernie Su	Margaret Dunlap	05:14	17 January 2013
L26	"Dreams"	Bernie Su	Rachel Kiley	03:16	18 January 2013
?8	"Question and Answers #8 w/ Gigi Darcy"	Bernie Su	Bernie Su	02:33	19 January 2013
81	"Awkward"	Bernie Su	Margaret Dunlap	05:08	21 January 2013
L27	"Heartbreaker"	Bernie Su	Rachel Kiley	02:19	22 January 2013
82	"Checks and Balances"	Bernie Su	Jay Bushman	06:15	24 January 2013
L28	"Special Two"	Bernie Su	Rachel Kiley	04:56	25 January 2013
83	"Corporate Interview"	Bernie Su	Kate Rorick	05:16	28 January 2013
L29	"Good Enough"	Bernie Su	Rachel Kiley	04:41	29 January 2013
G1	"Demonstration"	Bernie Su	Bernie Su	02:45	30 January 2013
84	"Ugh"	Bernie Su	Kate Rorick	04:14	31 January 2013
G2	"Messages"	Bernie Su	Bernie Su	02:18	1 February 2013

=== Consequences ===
No.	Title	Directed by	Written by	Length	Original release date
85	"Consequences"	Bernie Su	Rachel Kiley	04:49	4 February 2013
G3	"Tracking"	Bernie Su	Bernie Su	03:08	5 February 2013
86	"Sisterly Support"	Bernie Su	Rachel Kiley	05:04	7 February 2013
G4	"Query"	Bernie Su	Bernie Su	02:23	8 February 2013
87	"An Understanding"	Bernie Su	Rachel Kiley	08:13	11 February 2013
G5	"If Else"	Bernie Su	Bernie Su	04:02	12 February 2013
88	"Okay"	Bernie Su	Rachel Kiley	04:36	14 February 2013
G6	"Return"	Bernie Su	Bernie Su	03:26	15 February 2013
89	"Insomnia"	Bernie Su	Margaret Dunlap	04:05	18 February 2013
90	"Something Lighter... Please"	Bernie Su	Margaret Dunlap	05:45	21 February 2013
?9	"Question and Answers #9 with Bing Lee"	Bernie Su	Bernie Su	03:07	23 February 2013
91	"How About That"	Bernie Su	Kate Rorick	04:09	25 February 2013
92	"Goodbye Jane"	Bernie Su	Kate Rorick	07:11	28 February 2013
93	"Look Who's Back"	Bernie Su	Margaret Dunlap	03:59	4 March 2013
94	"Revelations"	Bernie Su	Rachel Kiley	04:13	7 March 2013
95	"End of the Line"	Bernie Su	Jay Bushman & Bernie Su	05:49	11 March 2013
96	"Talking to Myself"	Bernie Su	Margaret Dunlap	04:20	14 March 2013
97	"Special Delivery"	Bernie Su	Kate Rorick	04:55	18 March 2013
98	"Gratitude"	Bernie Su	Kate Rorick	06:11	21 March 2013
?10	"Question and Answers #10 with William Darcy"	Bernie Su	Bernie Su	03:05	23 March 2013
99	"Future Talk"	Bernie Su	Jay Bushman	07:16	25 March 2013
100	"The End"	Bernie Su	Bernie Su	05:05	28 March 2013

== Bonus Episode list ==
In anticipation of the release of the series' novel on June 24, 2014, The Secret Diary of Lizzie Bennet by Bernie Su and Kate Rorick, two bonus episodes were posted in 2014, over a year after the series' end.

No.	Title	Directed by	Written by	Length	Original release date
1	"Dr. Gardiner's Seminar - Bonus 1"	Bernie Su	Kate Rorick	05:11	22 May 2014
2	"Dr. Gardiner's Seminar - Bonus 2"	Bernie Su	Kate Rorick	05:41	10 June 2014
