= Frankenstein, MD =

2014 American web series

- Genre: Comedy; Gothic horror
- Created by: Brett Register; Lon Harris; Bernie Su
- Based on: Frankenstein by Mary Shelley
- Written by: Brett Register; Lon Harris
- Directed by: Brett Register
- Starring: Anna Lore; Steve Zaragoza
- Country of origin: United States
- Original language: English
- No. of seasons: 1
- No. of episodes: 24

Production
- Executive producers: Brett Register; Lon Harris; Bernie Su
- Producers: Tracy Bitterolf; Frederick Kim
- Production location: YouTube Space LA
- Cinematography: Matt Ryan
- Running time: 6 minutes
- Production companies: Pemberley Digital; PBS Digital Studios

Original release
- Network: YouTube
- Release: August 19 – October 31, 2014

Frankenstein, MD is a 2014 American Gothic horror comedy webseries with transmedia elements. Produced in partnership between Pemberley Digital and PBS Digital Studios, the show is a modern adaptation of Mary Shelley's 1818 novel Frankenstein; or, The Modern Prometheus, replacing the eponymous character with Victoria Frankenstein, a medical student near graduation. The show, which represents PBS Digital's first foray into scripted content, was created by Bernie Su, Brett Register, and Lon Harris. It ran on YouTube from August 19 through October 31, 2014, and was generally well-received by critics.

== Synopsis ==
Frankenstein, MD is presented as an educational webseries presented by medical students (and later doctors) Victoria Frankenstein and Iggy DeLacey from the fictional Engle State University. Each episode generally consists of Frankenstein experimenting with cutting-edge medical technologies or theories, often using DeLacey or her childhood friends Eli Lavenza and Rory Clerval as subjects. Dr. Abraham Waldman serves as an adviser to Frankenstein, usually acting as a foil and reminding her of the impracticality or perceived impossibility of her experiments and theories.

Partway through the series, the show's unseen camera operator and editor, Robert Walton, dies from a fall while adventuring in Alaska, where his body is left partially preserved in the snow. Frankenstein becomes distraught and attempts to revive Walton's corpse with DeLacey's help in secret using the medical technologies she had expounded upon earlier in the show. The attempt is successful, but the revived creature is startled by light and escapes the lab, running into the woods. Later, as Frankenstein and Lavenza are trying to locate the creature from her father's basement, Clerval is killed mysteriously while camping. The creature confronts Frankenstein and asks her to make him a friend. She grows morally opposed to the idea of recreating her experiment and agrees to run off to Costa Rica with Lavenza after he confesses his love to her. The creature returns to her makeshift lab and kills Lavenza in anger after he tries to stop it from hurting Frankenstein.

== Production ==
Frankenstein, MD was announced in May 2014, in a partnership between PBS Digital Studios, the online arm of the American Public Broadcasting Service (PBS), and Pemberley Digital whose previous webseries included The Lizzie Bennet Diaries (an adaptation of Jane Austen's Pride and Prejudice) and Emma Approved (based on Austen's Emma). The show is a transmedia adaptation of Frankenstein; or, The Modern Prometheus by Mary Shelley that reimagines the story's male protagonist Victor Frankenstein as a female student of medicine named Victoria Frankenstein. The show is PBS Digital's first scripted program, though it also includes educational elements.

According to its writers, Frankenstein, MD's narrative fills a two-year gap left by Shelley's source text between Victor Frankenstein's time at medical school and his reappearance as a mad scientist. The original Frankenstein is driven to insanity by his ostracization and Frankenstein, MD attempted to recontextualize this concept by gender-swapping its lead. Victoria Frankenstein is a medical student and later doctor grappling with institutional sexism in what the creators called the "sort of a male-dominated profession" of medicine.

The show is produced by Bernie Su who was previously responsible for Pemberley Digital's other webseries. Filmed at YouTube's Space LA production studio, it premiered on the site on August 19, 2014. Prior to the show's premiere, accounts on social media for various characters in the show were created, allowing viewers to interact with Frankenstein's protagonists. Joe Hanson, host of PBS Digital's It's Okay To Be Smart, acts as the show's science consultant. In early episodes of the show, Frankenstein neglected to wear gloves during her experiments which Su claimed was because, "real science and real-life procedures aren't sexy for entertainment". During its run, fans noticed this and called the show out for the error; in later episodes she is depicted with gloves on for all of her scientific work. The first season of the show concluded after 24 five- to eight-minute episodes on October 31, 2014.

Episodes of Frankenstein, MD are directed by Brett Register, executive produced by Su, and produced by Tracy Bitterolf with consulting producer by Frederick Kim. Register and Lon Harris serve as showrunners with the latter also working as head writer. Other writers include Kim, Danielle Evenson, and Taylor Brogan. The series's cinematographer is Matt Ryan.

== Cast and characters ==
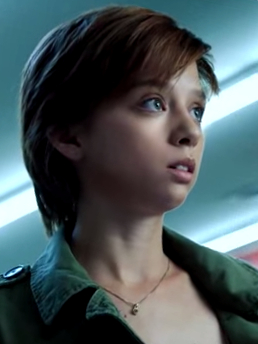
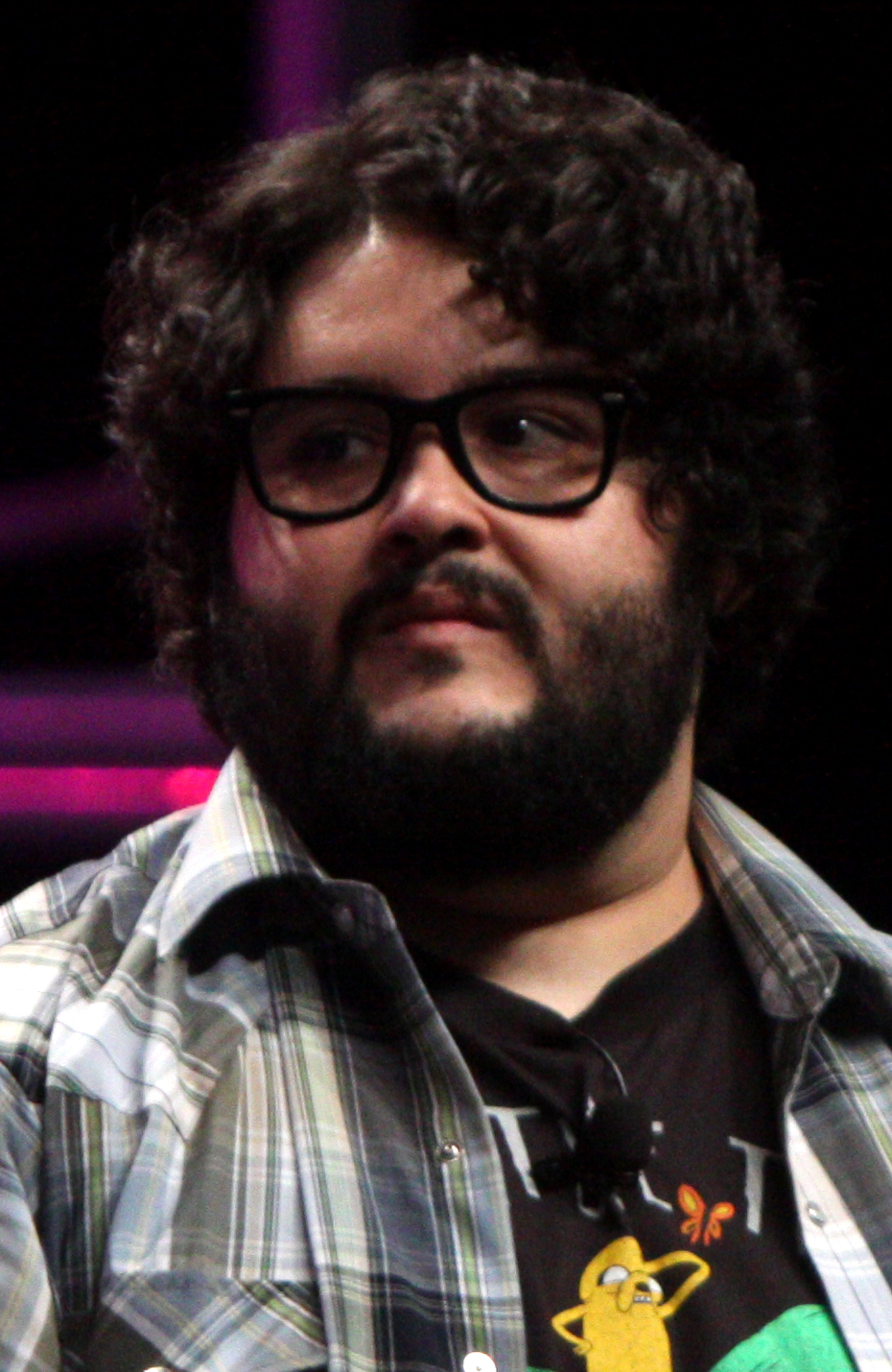
Lore (Frankenstein) and Zaragoza (DeLacey)
- Victoria Frankenstein (Anna Lore) – Analogous to Victor Frankenstein, she is a medical student described by The New York Observer as "smart, strong willed and filled with both an insatiable desire to learn about science and an unwavering belief in the field itself." According to Register, Frankenstein's character was not fully understood by the creators of the show until after Lore was cast on July 23, 2014. She helped them view the role as "this very confident but almost introverted character".
- Ludwig "Iggy" DeLacey (Steve Zaragoza) – Analogous to Igor, he is Frankenstein's fellow student and co-host of her show. Zaragoza mailed an audition tape to the show's producers before in-person auditions began which "set the bar for the character of Iggy" according to Register.
- Dr. Abraham Waldman (Kevin Rock) – Analogous to M. Waldman, he serves as a mentor to Frankenstein.
- Eli Lavenza (Brendan Bradley) – Analogous to Elizabeth Lavenza, he is one of Frankenstein's close friends.
- Rory Clerval (Sara Fletcher) – Analogous to Henry Clerval, she is another of Frankenstein's close friends.
- Robert Walton / The Creature (Evan Strand) – A combination of both Robert Walton and Frankenstein's monster from the novel, Walton is the camera operator for Frankenstein's vlog. He dies and is reanimated by her experiments. Lon Harris, a producer and writer of the series, chose Strand to perform The Creature because Strand's performance was very different from Boris Karloff's, and Tracy Bitterolf, a producer, praised Strand's control of his body. Strand described his performance as being inspired by a five-year-old child, a silverback gorilla, and a rhinoceros.

== Episodes ==
Frankenstein, MD episodes
No. overall	No. in season	Title	Original release date
1	1	"Introducing Victoria"	August 19, 2014
2	2	"The Truth about Fake Blood"	August 19, 2014
3	3	"Anaesthetics vs. Paralytics"	August 19, 2014
4	4	"Magnetic Brain Stimulation"	August 22, 2014
5	5	"Mind Control Rats"	August 26, 2014
6	6	"Frozen Rats"	August 29, 2014
7	7	"Natural Remedies"	September 2, 2014
8	8	"Sleep Deprivation"	September 5, 2014
9	9	"Great and Sudden Change"	September 9, 2014
10	10	"Build-a-Bone"	September 12, 2014
11	11	"The Spectacular Spider-Goat"	September 16, 2014
12	12	"Pressure Drop"	September 19, 2014
13	13	"Eyesight to the Blind"	September 23, 2014
14	14	"Unfrozen"	September 26, 2014
15	15	"Birth"	September 30, 2014
16	16	"Lesson One"	October 3, 2014
17	17	"The Brilliant Dr. Victoria"	October 7, 2014
18	18	"The Gummi Worm Story"	October 10, 2014
19	19	"Zombie Brain Aggression"	October 14, 2014
20	20	"Life Finds a Way"	October 17, 2014
21	21	"Should I Stay or Should I Go?"	October 21, 2014
22	22	"Friends with Words"	October 24, 2014
23	23	"#CreatureDay2"	October 28, 2014
24	24	"Alone Together"	October 31, 2014

== Reception ==
Reviewing the first three episodes of the show for The A.V. Club, Myles McNutt felt that the fact that the show was a coproduction of PBS and Pemberley Digital was "the most exciting part" but that it was also the element "that takes the most time to negotiate in the series’ first three episodes, as the writers and the audience alike adjust to the distinct goals of the science fiction vlog webseries." McNutt declared the first three episodes "a solid start" and rated them B+, B, and A−, respectively. Nicole Vranjican wrote in The New York Observer that the show "has a definite juvenile feel and is likely best suited for scientifically curious Jr. High students" and that its message "that being smart is cool...sets a standard for television that more TV shows should get behind". After viewing the first six episodes, Atiya Abbas noted in Vox Magazine that "[t]he series is light-hearted compared to the dark subject of the novel". On Hypable, Marama Whyte called the show "highly comedic" and noted its high production value and Anna Lore's "standout performance" as positive aspects. The show aired on domestic and international television in 2017 through a deal with Sinclair Broadcast Group.
