= Jay Bushman =

American transmedia writer

- Occupation: Writer
- Writing career
- Notable work: The Lizzie Bennet Diaries
- Website: www.jaybushman.com

Jay Bushman is an American transmedia writer and book author.

== Transmedia writing ==
Bushman was a writer and producer on The Lizzie Bennet Diaries, a digital adaptation of Pride & Prejudice, for which he won an Emmy in 2013 for "Outstanding Creative Achievement In Interactive Media – Original Interactive Program". The transmedia elements of the piece included 35 Twitter feeds for individual characters. The series ran from April 2012 to March 2013 and won YouTube Streamy Awards and the IAWTV Award for Best Interactive/Social Media experience.

The team followed the series' success with the release of Welcome to Sandition and Emma Approved, vlog series that also included Twitter accounts for individual characters.

In 2014, Bushman released #hamlet, a multiplatform web series. He was named one of "10 Filmmakers to Watch in 2014" by Independent Magazine.

Bushman worked at Fourth Wall Studios as a writer and producer, where he helped create the Emmy-nominated series Dirty Work and wrote and created the show Airship Dracula.

Bushman serves on the Peabody Awards Board of Jurors for Digital and Interactive Storytelling.

== Books ==
In 2021, Bushman released Novel Advice: Practical Wisdom for Your Favorite Literary Characters with Simon & Schuster, a book of advice for classic literature characters including Victor Frankenstein and Lady MacBeth.
