= Brendan Bradley =

Brendan Bradley may refer to:

- Brendan Bradley (actor) (born 1983), American actor
- Brendan Bradley (footballer) (born 1950), Irish footballer
