= Ministry of Culture and Tourism (Turkey) =

Government ministry of Turkey

- Kültür ve Turizm Bakanlığı
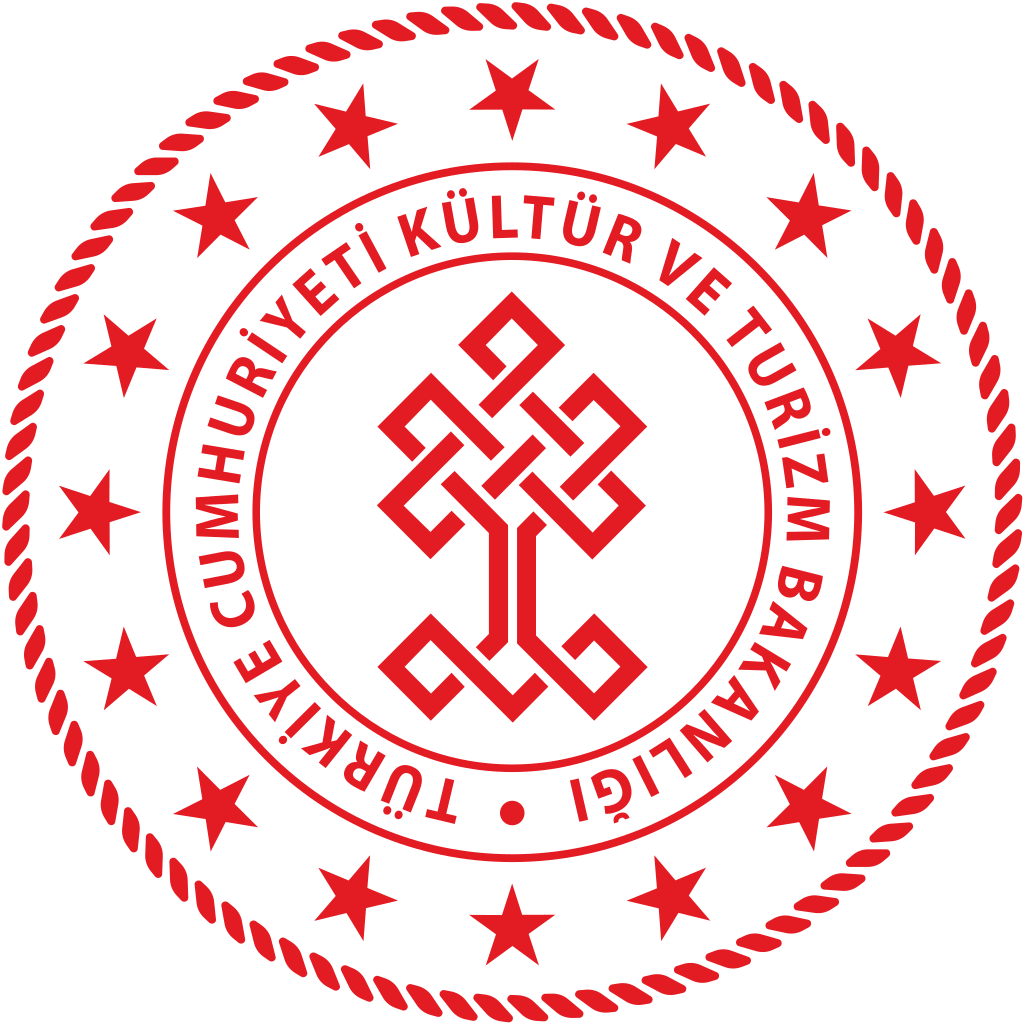

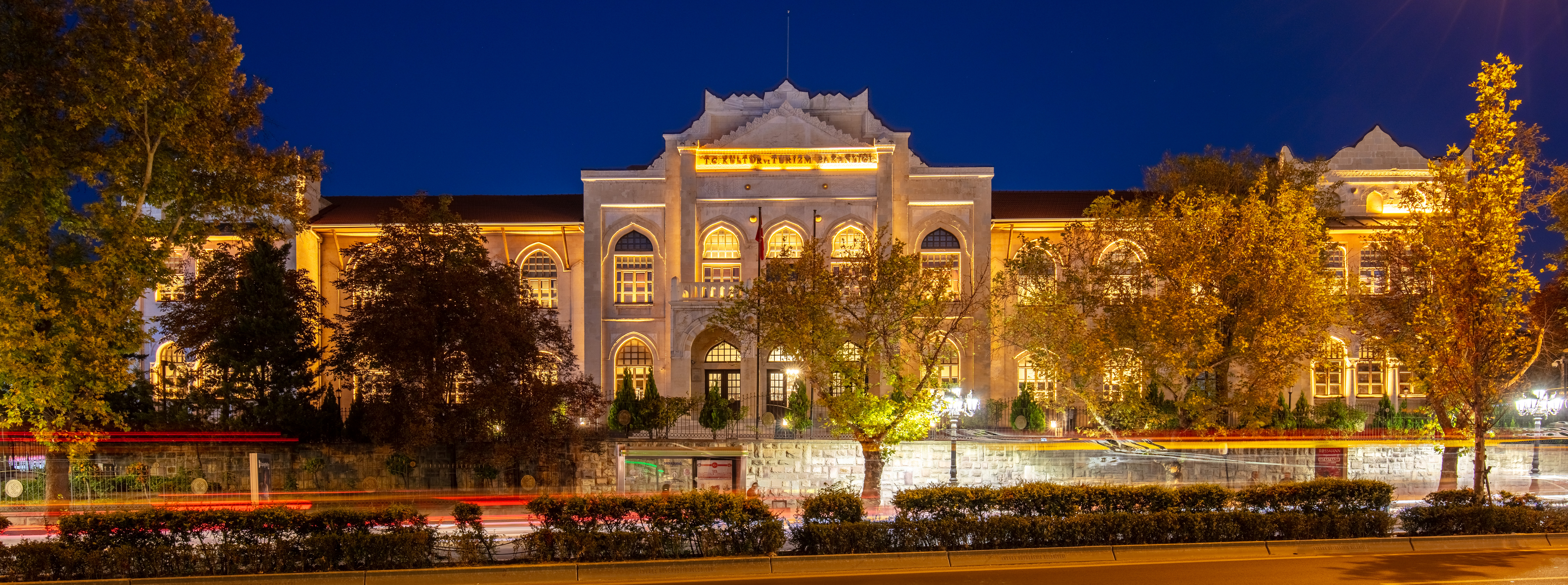
- Republic of Turkey Ministry of Culture and Tourism building, Ankara

Agency overview
- Formed: 2003
- Jurisdiction: Government of Turkey
- Headquarters: Ankara
- Annual budget: 38.964.106.000 TL (2024)
- Minister responsible: Mehmet Nuri Ersoy
- Deputy Ministers responsible: Batuhan Mumcu; Gökhan Yazgı; Nadir Alpaslan; Serdar Çam
- Website: ktb.gov.tr

The Ministry of Culture and Tourism (Turkish: Kültür ve Turizm Bakanlığı) is a government ministry of the Republic of Turkey, responsible for culture and tourism affairs in Turkey. Revolving fund management of the ministry is carried by DÖSİMM. On July 9, 2018, the newly elected President of Turkey Recep Tayyip Erdoğan announced his cabinet of the new Turkish political system. Mehmet Nuri Ersoy was appointed Minister of Culture and Tourism.

== Ministry functions ==
The Turkish Ministry of Tourism assigns inspectors who inspect tourism investments and enterprises. This includes inspecting safety measures.

One of the responsibilities of the ministry is the preservation of manuscripts, so they are available and accessible to researchers.

== Controversies ==
In promoting the country, the ministry often created promotional films for the country. In 2015, the ministry gained controversy after axing a scene from a $4 million-dollar promotional involving Julianne Moore due to her allegedly "poor acting". Ruhsar Demirel, of the Nationalist Movement Party, asked social affairs minister Ayşenur İslam: "How reasonable do you find promoting Turkey with the body of such names and women? How do you find, as a woman, giving plenty of money to a Hollywood star to promote Turkey, as if it were the 19th century?", and other politicians criticised her for a "depressive persona". In 2017, alongside Turkish Airlines and Turkish tourism companies, the Ministry of Culture and Tourism helped finance Non-Transferable, a romantic comedy film produced by Brendan Bradley.

In June 2018, the Ministry has sent a directive to the head of the excavations team in Turkey notifying them that according to a new regulation, 51 percent of archaeological excavation teams led by foreign crews should consist of Turkish nationals, the key posts in excavations such as archaeologist, anthropologist, art historian, restaurateur, architect, and photographer, should be reserved for Turkish citizens.

== See also ==
- List of Intangible Cultural Heritage elements in Turkey
- Tourism in Turkey
- Turkey Cultural Route Festivals
