= Türkiye Culture Route Festival =

Türkiye Culture Route Festival Türkiye Kültür Yolu Festivali
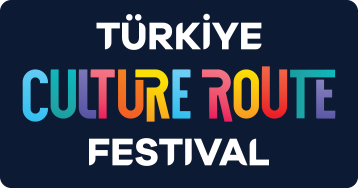
- Status: Active
- Genre: Festival
- Begins: 2021
- Frequency: Annually
- Locations: Ankara; Antalya; Çanakkale; Diyarbakır; Erzurum; Gaziantep; Istanbul; İzmir; Konya; Nevşehir; Trabzon
- Country: Turkey
- Inaugurated: 2021
- Founder: Ministry of Culture and Tourism of the Republic of Turkey
- Most recent: 2023
- Next event: 2024
- Website: kulturyolufestivalleri.com

Türkiye Culture Route Festival, are cultural festival that has been organized by the Ministry of Culture and Tourism of the Republic of Turkey in various provinces of Turkey since 2021. The festivals are organized with the aim of increasing Turkey's international brand value and making its historical and cultural heritage a center of attraction.

== History ==
Türkiye Culture Route Festival, which started with the Çanakkale Cultural Route Festival for the first time in 2021 by the Ministry of Culture and Tourism of the Republic of Turkey, continued with the Beyoğlu Culture Route Festival starting with the opening of the Atatürk Cultural Center on October 29.

The festival in 2022; It has been diversified as Ankara Başkent, Çanakkale Troya, Diyarbakır Sur and Konya Mystic Music Festival, and in 2023 as Nevşehir Cappadocia Balloon and Culture Road, Erzurum Palandöken, Trabzon Sümela, İzmir Efes, Gaziantep GastroAntep and Antalya.

Old logo until 2024

In December 2023, the festival became a member of the European Festivals Association (EFA).
