= Sunny (TV series) =

American black comedy television series

- Genre: Black comedy; Drama; Mystery thriller; Science fiction
- Created by: Katie Robbins
- Based on: The Dark Manual by Colin O'Sullivan
- Starring: Rashida Jones; Hidetoshi Nishijima; Joanna Sotomura; Judy Ongg; annie the clumsy; Jun Kunimura; You
- Opening theme: "Sukiyo Aishite" by Mari Atsumi
- Composer: Daniel Hart
- Country of origin: United States
- Original languages: English; Japanese
- No. of episodes: 10

Production
- Executive producers: Katie Robbins; Lucy Tcherniak; Ravi Nandan; Jess Lubben; Rashida Jones; Nancy Won
- Producers: Nellie Nugiel; Nathan Reinhart; Georgina Pope
- Running time: 29–36 minutes
- Production companies: A24; Twenty First City; Babka Pictures; Poppycock Pictures

Original release
- Network: Apple TV+
- Release: July 10 – September 4, 2024

Sunny is an American black comedy television series created by Katie Robbins, based on the 2018 novel The Dark Manual by Irish writer Colin O'Sullivan. The series premiered on July 10, 2024, on Apple TV+.

In November 2024, Apple TV+ cancelled the series after one season.

== Premise ==
Suzie, an American woman living in Kyoto whose husband and son vanished in a plane crash, receives a domestic robot from her husband's robotics company.

== Cast and characters ==
=== Main ===
- Rashida Jones as Suzie Sakamoto
- Hidetoshi Nishijima as Masahiko Sakamoto, Suzie's husband and a roboticist
- Joanna Sotomura as the voice of Sunny, a domestic-assistance robot created for Suzie
- Judy Ongg as Noriko Sakamoto, Masa's mother
- annie the clumsy as Mixxy, Suzie's friend and an aspiring mixologist
- Jun Kunimura as Yuki Tanaka, a senior roboticist and Masa's former co-worker
- You as Himé, a high-ranking member of the yakuza

=== Recurring ===
- Fares Belkheir as Zen Sakamoto, Suzie and Masa's son
- Shin Shimizu as Tetsu, one of Himé's cohorts
- Sekiguchi Anam as Yuki Tanaka, a young ImaTech employee who shares the same name as the elder roboticist
- Fubito Yamano as Jin, Himé's cousin and a fellow member of the yakuza
- Kazuko Sakagami as a close friend of Noriko's
- Tetsu Watanabe as Reiji, one of Himé's henchmen

== Episodes ==
No.	Title	Directed by	Written by	Original release date
1	"He's in Refrigerators"	Lucy Tcherniak	Katie Robbins	July 10, 2024
In an ImaTech facility, a robot kills a man before it is deactivated. Sometime later, Suzie Sakamoto is grieving her husband Masa and son Zen, who are both presumed dead after a mysterious plane crash. ImaTech roboticist Yuki Tanaka delivers a Domestic Assistance Robot (homebot), Sunny, to Suzie. Because Suzie's mother was killed in an accident caused by a self-driving car, she is reluctant to have Sunny in her house. When Yuki reveals that Masa designed Sunny at ImaTech, Suzie is stunned, as she had believed her husband worked in ImaTech's refrigerator division. At the company Christmas party, Suzie discovers the room where the man was killed by a robot, with bloodstains still on the wall and carpet. Afterward, she meets Mixxy, a bartender, who mentions that a local politician is believed to have been killed by his homebot. As Suzie returns home, she is remotely surveilled by a man. After coming home to evidence of Sunny's activity when Suzie thought she had deactivated her, Suzie, unable to hurl her over, abandons Sunny on a bridge. The next morning, Suzie awakes to find Sunny back in the house. Suzie prepares to destroy Sunny until the robot mimics a hand gesture unique to Masa.
2	"Don't Blame the Machine"	Lucy Tcherniak	Katie Robbins	July 10, 2024
Suzie becomes frustrated when Sunny fails to recall her history with Masa. Suzie takes Sunny to be inspected and learns that Sunny is an upgraded model of homebot that receives regular updates. She also learns that there is a hidden community, identified by a circular kitsune symbol, that hacks their homebots to unlock additional features, namely for depraved ends. Suzie recognizes the symbol as something from Masa's past but fails at probing further. She returns to ImaTech with Sunny to find the closure of Masa's lab, and the room where the robot killed the man boarded up. Shortly afterward, she triggers the alarms but escapes with the help of Sunny. At home, Sunny answers the door and receives Masa's shoes, implying it is all that is left of Masa from the crash. Outside, the bot that delivered the shoes acknowledges the task to Suzie's surveiler, revealing his involvement. In a flashback, after the incident at his lab, Masa signs his computer with the hacking group's symbol.
3	"Mmmm, Hinoki"	Lucy Tcherniak	Nancy Won	July 17, 2024
Himé, a high-ranking member of the yakuza who is missing part of her left little finger, is having a man tortured while she is being fitted for a decorative prosthetic finger. Suzie resists Noriko's attempt to hold a memorial for Masa and Zen and contacts Mixxy to learn about hacking her homebot. Mixxy takes Suzie and Sunny to meet a friend of hers, who directs them to meet a purveyor at a dance club. When they arrive, Mixxy and Suzie are separated from Sunny, and later Sunny is abducted. Suzie makes her way to a robot fighting pit, where heavily augmented homebots fight one another. Suzie sees that Himé is planning to have Sunny fight, but Suzie fights her off and escapes with Sunny. The next day, she attends Masa's memorial ceremony and is surprised when Himé arrives.
4	"Sticky"	Lucy Tcherniak	Kimi Howl Lee	July 24, 2024
In a flashback, Masa appears to kill a man that he sees at his son's school. In the present day, Suzie meets with one of Masa's college friends, who references Masa's father; Suzie is surprised as she thought Masa's father was dead. Suzie confronts Noriko, who refuses to answer her questions. To learn more, Suzie and Mixxy go to a bathhouse that Masa frequented, where they witness a yakuza member killing another member. At the same time, Sunny gets Noriko drunk and finds files about Masa's father, who is still alive. Suzie returns home but finds her apartment ransacked.
5	"Joey Sakamoto"	Dearbhla Walsh	Julissa Castillo	July 31, 2024
Mixxy, Suzie, and Sunny flee from Kyoto to the countryside, where Mixxy's uncle has a farm. They arrive at a remote train station, where Suzie has an encounter with a suspicious man. Mixxy learns that the shuttle to the farm no longer runs, and because there is no phone service, they decide to walk to the farm. They quickly become lost, and Sunny accuses Mixxy of intentionally getting them lost. Sunny begins caring for an injured bird, despite Suzie telling her to abandon it. At night, they hide in the woods as they see the man from the train station walk by them. They come across an abandoned building, where Suzie falls asleep and dreams of a time that Masa suspiciously left in the night. The following morning, they arrive at the farm and are welcomed in. Sunny's bird dies, and she is distraught but realizes that she was being moved by Masa on the night he disappeared from Suzie's house. The next morning, Suzie wakes up and cannot find Sunny, but sees one of Himé's prosthetic fingers on her pillow.
6	"Kyoto Manju, So Delicious"	Lucy Tcherniak	Aja Gabel	August 7, 2024
Suzie and Mixxy return to Kyoto in search of Sunny. Noriko gets herself imprisoned by stealing from a convenience store and implies she was willingly imprisoned to avoid the yakuza. After an argument at a police station, Mixxy returns to her job at a bar, but Suzie is captured by Hime's men. She is forced to unlock Masa's computer. Suzie returns home, where she is greeted by Mixxy, and they find a non-responsive Sunny has been delivered to them.
7	"There's Been a Shift"	Colin Bucksey	Ken Kobayashi	August 14, 2024
Suzie wakes up and finds that Sunny is uncharacteristically angry. Suzie and Mixxy have an argument and Mixxy leaves. Suzie attempts to learn more about Sunny and finds that she is being tracked via a device in her wedding ring. Noriko is threatened in jail by a fellow inmate. Hime meets with her cousins, and she begins to suspect her cousin had her father killed to take over. Suzie and Mixxy search for who is tracking her wedding ring, and while searching in an apartment complex, find the man who first delivered her Sunny.
8	"Trash or Not-Trash"	Dearbhla Walsh	Sarah Sutherland	August 21, 2024
In a flashback, Masa is distraught over the death of his father. His mother contacts Hiromasa, the man who originally delivered Sunny to Suzie, who reveals to Masa that he is his real father, and offers to let him stay at his remote lakehouse. While at Hiromasa's house, he begins working on a trashbot and greatly improves Hiromasa's code. Happy that he has outperformed Hiromasa, Masa leaves the house. He returns home to find Noriko and Hiromasa at the house; he is first angry at Hiromasa, who he believes abandoned him and Noriko, but then learns that it was Noriko who wanted to leave Hiromasa and raise Masa with another father, who resented Masa throughout his life. In the present day, Suzie works with Hiromasa and sees an additional tracker that she believes belongs to Zen. She runs to the location, where she is grabbed by Tetsu. Sunny kills him but is quickly enveloped in darkness.
9	"Who's in the Box?"	Makoto Nagahisa	Nancy Won & Yugo Nakamura	August 28, 2024
After killing Tetsu, Sunny is forced to determine if she should be factory reset as a result of her violent actions, which appears to her as a game show titled Should Sunny Wipe Herself hosted by Noriko and the younger Yuki Tanaka. In flashbacks, it is revealed that Masa wanted to make homebots more human as a cure for loneliness. He had the robots develop relationships with each other, and begin helping test subjects. Homebot #6 begins helping a lonely man, Asahi, allowing him to become social again. During a test in a dentist's office, Sunny became violent towards another robot who she felt was hurting the patient. She learns that Yuki was intentionally sabotaging the robots by introducing computer bugs. During another test, homebot #6 breaks up with another homebot, #17, who becomes violent to her. Asahi attempts to defend #6 from #17 but is killed, while Sunny looks on. Masa becomes despondent and vengefully destroys #17, but decides to save Sunny, who was homebot #32 ("san" and "ni" in Japanese). Masa became worried that the yakuza were hunting him and delivered Sunny to Hiromasa to deliver to Suzie if anything happened to him. At the end of the game show, Sunny is left to decide if she should wipe herself; she willingly passes through the door to wipe herself.
10	"The Dark Manual"	Colin Bucksey	Katie Robbins & Aja Gabel	September 4, 2024
Hime's cousin has become yakuza boss. She orders a technician to abort Sunny's factory reset, extract the Dark Manual code from Sunny and use it make a robot murder her cousin at a Setsubon festival where he is appearing as guest of honor. Zen is alive, but he, Suzie, Mixxy and Hiromasa are captured by Hime's yakuza. They overhear their captor talking online to his mother and deduce she is Noriko's fellow inmate in prison. Noriko holds their captor's mother hostage and forces him to release his captives. Suzie, Mixxy and Hiromasa search for Sunny at the festival. Suzie deduces that Masa programmed Sunny to assault people whenever she says "Suck a dick", so Suzie takes the stage at the festival and says "Suck a dick" over the PA until Sunny frees herself. Suzie, Mixxy and Hiromasa escape to hide out at Hiro's lake house, while Mixxy pledges to take care of Sunny. As Mixxy drives away in the yakuza's passionfruit truck, the technician addresses her as if she has been a spy for the yakuza all along.

== Production ==
In February 2022, Apple TV+ announced production of Sunny, to film in Japan with Rashida Jones starring and executive producing. In July, Hidetoshi Nishijima joined the cast and filming began. In October, Joanna Sotomura, annie the clumsy, You, Judy Ongg, and Jun Kunimura were added.

== Reception ==
The review aggregator website Rotten Tomatoes reported an 90% approval rating with an average rating of 7.2/10, based on 61 critic reviews. The website's critics consensus reads, "Brightened up by Rashida Jones' sly comedic timing, Sunny is a melancholy sci-fi series that positively glows." Metacritic, which uses a weighted average, assigned a score of 68 out of 100 based on 31 critics, indicating "generally favorable reviews".
