= Anna Lore =

American actress

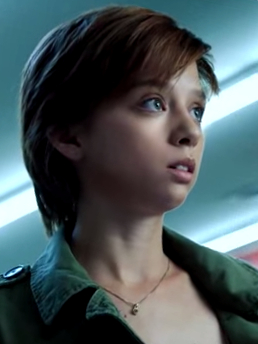
- Lore in 2014
- Born: Dubuque, Iowa, U.S.
- Occupation: Actress
- Years active: 2014–present

Anna Lore (born March 15) is an American actress. She is known for portraying the patient Chloe Turner in The Bright Sessions podcast, a lo-fi superpower sci-fi drama. Following a recurring role as Carrie on season 3 of the CW sports drama series All American (2021) and a starring role in the slasher film They/Them (2022), Lore received recognition for her main role as DC Comics character Stephanie Brown on the CW superhero series Gotham Knights (2023). She gained further attention for her starring role in the supernatural horror film Final Destination Bloodlines (2025).

== Career ==
Lore's initial acting projects included the YouTube web series Frankenstein, MD (2014), while also voice acting and appearing in short form web videos & web series. Lore later portrayed wrestler Daniel Bryan in the short film Wrestling Isn't Wrestling (2015).

In January 2020, Lore was cast in a starring role in "My Valentine," an episode of the Hulu horror anthology television series Into the Dark. The episode premiered in February. In March 2022, Lore was cast in a lead role as DC Comics superhero Stephanie Brown in Gotham Knights, a television pilot produced by The CW. In May, Gotham Knights was picked up to series, and the show premiered in March 2023.

In March 2024, Lore was cast in a starring role in the supernatural horror film Final Destination Bloodlines. 2025 also found Lore cast as Hope Blake in Black Phone 2, the late psychic mother of the film's main characters. The film was released in theaters in May 2025.

== Filmography ==
=== Film ===
Year	Title	Role	Notes
2015	Wrestling Isn't Wrestling	Daniel Bryan	Short film; credited as Anna Lore Baur Schoer
2015	Contracted: Phase II	Harper	
2016	Nasty Habits	Meg	Television film
2017	Born Guilty	Summer	
2019	Her Mind in Pieces	Rachel	Segment: "Therapy Through Lucid Dreaming"
2019	Artista Obscura	Da Wozniak	Television film
2022	They/Them	Kim	
2025	Final Destination Bloodlines	Julia Campbell	
2025	Black Phone 2	Hope Blake	
2026	Give It Up	Jess	

=== Television ===
Year	Title	Role	Notes
2014	Frankenstein, MD	Victoria Frankenstein	24 episodes
2016	Natural 20	Grizzit / Juan Snow	2 episodes
2016	Faking It	Cindy	2 episodes
2016	The Friendless Five	Brie	7 episodes
2016	What's News?	Party Girl	Episode: "Olympic Wienerbash"
2017	Training Day	Kat Wellsley	Episode: "Tunnel Vision"
2017	Nasty Habits	Megan	Episode: "Gank City"
2017–2018	Miss 2059	Daphnii	10 episodes
2018	F*ck Yes	Tess	2 episodes
2018	Katie	Katie	10 episodes; also producer and writer
2019	Doom Patrol	Penny Farthing	2 episodes
2020	Into the Dark	Trezzure	Episode: "My Valentine"
2020–2022	All American	Carrie	9 episodes
2023	Gotham Knights	Stephanie Brown	13 episodes
2023	Strange Planet	Various characters (voice)	Episode: "Family, Fandom, Footorb"
2024	Hysteria!	Tracy McCarthy	Episode: "Mother"
2025–2026	9-1-1: Nashville	Tilda	3 episodes
