= DÖSİMM =

Turkish government agency

DÖSİMM, an acronym for Döner Sermaye İşletmesi Merkez Müdürlüğü ("Revolving Funds Management Central Directory") is a sub unit of Ministry of Culture and Tourism of Turkey.

DÖSİMM has a market chain in Turkey which sell traditional crafts and books. It is also responsible in museum revenue and provides resources for protection, maintenance, and development of cultural heritage, and culture and tourism infrastructure investments.

== Statistics ==
The total number of visitors to DÖSİMM-controlled locations in 2017 was 20 509 000.

The most visited locations are listed below

Location or museum	Province	No.of visitors (in 000s)	World Heritage Site status
Mevlana Museum	Konya Province	2480	(Note: Konya city is in the tentative list)
Topkapı Palace	İstanbul Province	1932	(Note: "Historic places in İstanbul" is in the main list)
Hagia Sophia	İstanbul Province	1892	
Pamukkale	Denizli Province	1494	Main list
Ephesus	İzmir Province	996	Main list
Göreme	Nevşehir Province	682	Main list
Haji Bektash Veli Complex	Nevşehir Province	492	Tentative list
Ihlara Valley	Aksaray Province	386	
Republic Museum	Ankara Province	360	
Troy	Çanakkale Province	329	Main list
