= Daniel Vincent Gordh =

American writer and comedian (born 1985)

- Born: 24 June 1985 (age 40)
- Occupation(s): Actor, writer and comedian

Daniel Vincent Gordh (born 24 June 1985) is an American actor, writer and comedian, probably best known for his portrayal of William Darcy in the Primetime Emmy Award-winning web series The Lizzie Bennet Diaries.

== Career ==
Gordh completed a Bachelor of Arts degree in Theatre at the University of California, San Diego in 2007. During college, he competed in springboard diving, and was the UCSD Diver of the Year for 2006–07. Gordh is openly gay, after coming out on social media in 2015.

Gordh has acted in numerous web series. He was a series regular in The Lizzie Bennet Diaries (2012–14), for which he was nominated for the Streamy Award for Best Actor in a Drama in 2014. He also appeared in The Cracked Advice Board (2011), Hipsterhood (2013), The Dark Knight Legacy (2013) for Machinima, and Hollywood Acting Studio (2013), made for the Starz network.

Gordh's television roles include guest appearances on Cold Case and Mad Men, and his film roles include Night Watcher (2008), Black Velvet (2011) and Non-Transferable (2017).

== Filmography ==
=== Television and Film ===
Year	Title	Role	Notes
2004	Living Like Fire	Darren	(Film)
2008	Cold Case	Nick Vera '89 (credited as Daniel Gordh)	(TV Series), 1 episode: "Triple Threat"
2008	Night Watcher	Graham	(Straight to Video film)
2008	Fun with Lesley	Lesley	(Short film)
2008	The Game	Friend	(Short)
2008	How to Bury Betty	Josh	(Short)
2009	Iris	(Unnamed role)	(Short)
2009	Those Aren't Muskets	(Unnamed role)	(TV Series), 3 episodes: "Damn You, Recession", "Future House" and "IPN"
2010	Mad Men	Young Swimmer	(TV Series), 1 episode: "The Summer Man"
2011	Black Velvet	Pete	(Film)
2011–2012	Cracked Advice Board	Dr. Cone	(TV Web Series), 10 episodes
2012	How Stupid Words Get Added to the Dictionary	Dr. Goodrich	(Short)
2012	The Problem with High School	(Unnamed role)	(Short)
2012–2014	The Lizzie Bennet Diaries	William Darcy	(TV Web Series), 12 episodes
2013	Hipsterhood	Westin	(TV Web Series), 4 episodes
2013	Welcome to Sanditon	William Darcy	(Web TV Mini-Series), 1 episode: "Packet Loss"
2013	Domino: Gigi Darcy	William Darcy (credited as Daniel Gordh)	(Web TV Series), 4 episodes
2013	The Dark Knight Legacy	Nightwing	(Short)
2013–2014	Hollywood Acting Studio	Thomas	(Web TV Series), 12 episodes
2014	Rom.Com	Mike	(Web TV Mini-Series), 1 episode: "The 7 Most Popular Lies to Tell in Online Dating Profiles"
2015	Eastsiders	Henry	(Web TV Series), 2 episodes: "And Gomorrah" and "Sex Therapy"
2015	If the Internet Was a High School	Twitter	(Video short)
2016	We're Not Alone	Major Hawk	(TV Series), 1 episode: "Pilot"
2016	The Hindenburg Explodes!	Nazi #2	(Pilot Episode of Adult Swim))
2016	Honest Ads	Man	(Web TV Series), 1 episode: "If Coffee Commercials Were Honest"
2016	Ship It	Parole Officer	(Web TV Series), 1 episode: "Let's Start a Band"
2016	Change of Heart	Ben	(TV Movie)
2016	Unfinished Business	Joe	(Short)
2017	Non-Transferable	Musician Josh	(Film)
2017–2018	Conan	Superman (2017) / Professional Guy (2018) (both uncredited)	(TV Series), 2 episodes: "The Cast of 'Kingsman: The Golden Circle'" and "The Cast and Director of 'The Predator'"
2017–2020	Chris & Jack	Kyle (2017) / Daniel (2020)	(Web TV Series), 2 episodes: "The Art of the Heist" and "What's My Line?"
2018	Play by Play	Ice Byrd	(TV Series), 1 episode: "Get a Job"
2018	Sorry for Your Loss	Mike	(Web TV Series), 1 episode: "A Widow Walks into a Wedding"
2018	Babysitter's Nightmare	Glenn	(TV Movie)
2018	Disney Owns You	John Lasseter	(Web TV Mini-Series), 1 episode: "Pixar"
2018–2019	Matt and Dan	(Various including); Dan / Dave / Jeff / Sam / Chaz and Blake	(Web TV Series), 16 episodes
2019	Off Hours!	Daniel / Dan	(Web TV Series), 2 episodes: "If Your Life Got Rebooted, What Kind Would It Be?" and "The Least Likable "Likable" Sitcom Everyman"
2020	Perry Mason	Arraignment Clerk	(TV Series), 1 episode: "Chapter Three"

=== Web series ===
Year	Title	Role	Notes	Ref
2020	Trixie Mattel: One Night Only	Director, co-writer, and producer	Musical comedy special	

== Awards and nominations ==
Year	Award	Category	Work	Notes	Result	Ref.
2022	Critics' Choice Television Awards	Best Comedy Special	Trixie Mattel: One Night Only	as director, co-writer, and producer	Nominated	
