= Hipsterhood =

American comedy web series

- Genre: Comedy
- Created by: Shilpi Roy
- Starring: Kit Williamson; Elizabeth Ferraris; Daniel Vincent Gordh
- Composer: Anthony C Kuhnz
- Country of origin: United States
- Original language: English
- No. of seasons: 2
- No. of episodes: 19 (list of episodes)

Production
- Producer: Shilpi Roy
- Production location: Los Angeles, California
- Running time: 1-5 minutes

Original release
- Network: YouTube; Blip
- Release: August 21, 2012 – October 29, 2013

Hipsterhood is an American comedy web series, created and written by Indian-American director Shilpi Roy. The series is broadcast on the internet and premiered on August 21, 2012. So far, nineteen episodes have been made and the show can be found distributed across the web including on YouTube and Blip. Hipsterhood is about discovering what it is to be a hipster in LA, and what it is like to fall in love with fellow hipsters who are too cool for love. The shows plot revolves around two hipsters who are both living in Silver Lake, Los Angeles, who keep crossing paths but can't seem to get to the next level of actually talking.

== History ==
Hipsterhood was inspired and written by Shilpi Roy, a director producer who moved to Silver Lake, LA in 2007 to follow her dream of becoming a filmmaker. In an interview with Shilpi Roy, it states that when she moved to Silver Lake, she did not see herself as a hipster. Shilpi bought a pair of skinny jeans and it made her ask the question ‘does that make me a hipster?', which created an identity crisis. Shilpi started analysing the hipsters around her and that is where the idea for the dialogue came from. The first season was solely funded by Shilpi’s own savings. The second season is being funded by a kickstarter campaign which launched on Feb 4 2013 and successfully raised $7,041 beating their original goal of $5000. Shilpi Roy started her career working for Warren Littlefield, the former head of NBC. After attending the USC School of Cinematic Arts, where she made the award-winning short film The Indian & the Samurai, Shilpi worked for controversial companies such as Brave New Films, and PlayboyTV.

== Plot ==
The plot surrounds two hipsters - Cereal Guy and Faux Fur Girl - who are too cool for each other, but too awkward for themselves. The majority of the "dialogue" takes the form of the characters' thoughts as they consider talking to one another. The characters, played by Elizabeth Ferraris and Kit Williamson, always obsess about what to say or do, resulting in awkwardly silent interactions in real life. Daniel Vincent Gordh of the Lizzie Bennet Diaries will be a new character in season 2.

== Season 1 ==
Every episode was filmed in a different location in Silver Lake, Los Angeles.

- Episode 1: Hipsters meet at the grocery store
- Episode 2: Two Hipsters one street corner, Silver Lake
- Episode 3: The Hipster Jog
- Episode 4: Hipster Catastrophe at the coffee shop
- Episode 5: Hipsters at the dry cleaners
- Episode 6: The “other” women at the 99 cent store
- Episode 7: The “other” woman from hipster Guy's POV
- Episode 8: A hipster boutique on Sunset Blvd
- Episode 9: Hipster's dog birthday party

== Season 2 ==
- Episode 1: Hipsters with Hangovers
- Episode 2: Hipster Run-In at the Pharmacy
- Episode 3: When Hipsters Date
- Episode 4: Hipsters Texting
- Episode 5: Sometimes a Hipster Just Needs a Drink
- Episode 6: Flashback! Hipster Ping Pong
- Episode 7: Hipsters Jogging, Again
- Episode 8: The 99 Cent Store, Revisited
- Episode 9: Hipster Mecca: The Silverlake Farmers Market
- Episode 10: Hipsters in Nature
