= Succubus (2024 film) =

2024 erotic horror film

- Film poster
- Directed by: R.J. Daniel Hanna
- Written by: R.J. Daniel Hanna
- Starring: Brendan Bradley; Olivia Grace Applegate; Rachel Cook; Ron Perlman
- Production companies: Convoke Media; BondIt Media Capital; Pixium Film Group; Kiss and Tale Productions
- Distributed by: Shout! Studios
- Release date: September 24, 2024
- Running time: 103 minutes
- Country: United States
- Language: English

Succubus is a 2024 erotic horror film written and directed by R.J. Daniel Hanna. It stars Brendan Bradley, Olivia Grace Applegate, Rachel Cook, and Ron Perlman.

== Premise ==
Chris and his wife Sharon are going through a trial separation. Through a dating app, Chris meets a seductive and mysterious woman named Adra, who captures his interest, but proves to be someone quite dangerous.

== Cast ==
- Brendan Bradley as Chris
- Olivia Grace Applegate as Sharon
- Rosanna Arquette as Denise
- Rachel Cook as Adra
- Emily Kincaid as Charlisse
- Ron Perlman as Dr. Orion Zephyr
- Derek Smith as Eddie

== Reception ==
Terry Sherwood of Film Threat gave the film a score of 7/10, praising the cast and its sense of tension, and commenting that its sexuality is "necessary to the plot and is tastefully handled while still being titillating." Norman Gidney of horrorbuzz.com gave the film a score of 6/10, calling it "fun" and "inventive", but also commenting that "the story could have benefited from judicious edits and a clipped momentum." Alyssa Miller of morbidlybeautiful.com praised the practical effects and CGI, and called the cinematography "direct and haunting", ultimately concluding that the film "has its flaws, but the pros greatly outweigh the cons, making it an easy recommendation."

== See also ==
- List of succubi in fiction
