= Non-Transferable =

- Directed by: Brendan Bradley
- Written by: Brendan Bradley
- Starring: Ashley Clements; Brendan Bradley; Shanna Malcolm
- Distributed by: Lightning Entertainment
- Release date: February 14, 2017
- Country: United States

Non-Transferable is a 2017 romantic comedy film written and directed by Brendan Bradley. The film was widely seen as getting onto the YouTuber film "trend", featuring other famous YouTubers such as Shanna Malcolm, Shira Lazar, Sara Fletcher and Ashley Clements.

== Plot ==
The film centers around a young woman named Amy Tyler, who books a surprise holiday to Europe with her boyfriend Josh Merit. However, the two separate before they are able to go onto the trip; therefore, she advertises her tickets online in search for another man with an identical name to her ex-boyfriend to go on the tour instead. The story, although written in 2012, bore similarities to a 2014 case of a 28-year-old Toronto man named Jordan Axani, who offered up free tickets to on Reddit a girl named Elizabeth Gallagher, when he broke up with his girlfriend of the same name. Although his ticket had a strict no-transfer policy, as passport information was not required when booking, the ticket could be used by anyone with the same name.

When a BuzzFeed article about the story became popular, the script was given "new life". Brendan Bradley said that "I wrote this script five years ago", Bradley said, "and everyone told me ... 'This would never happen! This is too unrealistic!' And the project didn’t get any traction because everyone thought the premise was too crazy. And then it happened in real life."

== Filmmaking model ==
Despite having minimal production money in and of themselves, Bradley and the film crew worked with Turkish tourist companies such as Turkish Airlines, the Ministry of Culture and Tourism and VIP Tourism Agency, as well as working with Land Rover. These companies partially funded the trip, in exchange for featuring the airline, hotels and tourist attractions in the film. Brendan said he came up with the idea after reading Blockbusters by Anita Elberse, which explains why it's difficult for new filmmakers to enter the industry.

This has been seen as a tactical move on by Turkish Airlines in order to encourage millennial tourism. The Head of Sponsorships at the Turkish Ministry of Culture and Tourism, Irfan Onal, said "Digital and social media is the reality of the world today. We invest in it a lot because it's the best way to create a connection between Turkey as a destination and an individual." Ashley said "You watch Under the Tuscan Sun and you think, 'I must go to Tuscany! So beautiful!' ... [In the film,] we could showcase [Turkey] in a way that would make you go, 'Wow, Turkey is so beautiful and I had no idea!' Which was very much our experience going there. It's a country that's really at the epicenter of so much history."
