= Joanna Sotomura =

American actress

Joanna Sotomura is an American actress. She is best known for her work on the horror movie Madison County (2011), the Emmy Award-winning web series Emma Approved (2013) and the romantic drama film Everything Before Us (2015).

== Education ==
Born and raised in Hawaii, Sotomura graduated from 'Iolani School in 2005. She graduated from Loyola Marymount University in Los Angeles, California, with a Bachelor of Fine Arts degree in Theatre Arts in 2009.

== Personal life ==
Sotomura dated her Emma Approved co-star Brent Bailey between 2013 and 2014. She married photographer Eric MacIver in January 2020, and the two welcomed a daughter in December 2023.

== Filmography ==
=== Films (Feature-length and short) ===
| Film name | Character | Status | Release date |
|---|---|---|---|
| Negative | Abigail | Completed | 2017 |
| Captain Black | Woman At Bar #2 | Post-Production | 2016 |
| Method Acting | Casting Assistant | Post-Production | 2016 |
| Get the Girl | Jane | Completed | 27 Jan 2017 |
| My Friends Can't Stop Kissing | Bonnie | Completed | 15 Jul 2016 |
| Contracted: Phase II | Debbie | Completed | 4 Sept 2015 |
| Everything Before Us | Anna | Completed | 3 Jun 2015 |
| Chinese New Year Hack | Joanna | Completed | 18 Feb 2015 |
| The Poisoning | Michelle | Completed | 24 Dec 2013 |
| Geek USA | Kyra Featherstone | Completed | 10 Oct 2013 |
| Eat Me | Jackie Hadelsmith | Completed | 2012 |
| Shaken | Sasha | Completed | 31 Mar 20 |
| Madison County | Brooke | Completed | 17 Oct 2011 |
| Pieces of Emily | Emily | Completed | 2008 |

=== TV series / web series ===
| Series name | Character | No. of episodes | Episode/s | Year |
|---|---|---|---|---|
| Chicago Med | Jean Leilani | 1 | "Spill Your Guts" | 2026 |
| Stillwater | Albatross and Mako (voice) | 1 | "Finders Keepers/Good Advice" | 2025 |
| Sunny | Sunny | 10 | All Episodes | 2024 |
| Bookie | Gabby | 1 | "A Square Job in a Round Hole" | 2023 |
| Headless: A Sleepy Hollow Story | Douffe Martling | 6 | "The Local Legend", "The Ghosts in the Graveyard", "The Briny Booty", "The Secrets in the Sea Log", "The Heist at the Hotel", "The Haunting of the Hollow" | 2022 |
| Barry | Casey | 3 | "forgiving jeff", "all the sauces", "crazytimesh*tshow" | 2022 |
| I Love That for You | Cheryl | 1 | "GottaHaveIt" | 2022 |
| Wayward Guide for the Untrained Eye | Madison Reynolds | 9 | "The Wolf At The Door", "Miner Setback", "On the Trail", "Crying Wolf", "Elective Memory", "Grin and Bare It", "In Sheep's Clothing", "Belly of the Beast", "New Moon" | 2020 |
| NCIS: Los Angeles | Christina Ng | 1 | "Provenance" | 2019 |
| Hawaii Five-0 | Mila | 1 | "Kopi Wale No I Ka I'a A 'Eu No Ka Ilo" | 2018 |
| The Good Place | Véronique | 1 | "Team Cockroach" | 2017 |
| Disillusioned | Nicole | 1 | "Girls" | 2015 |
| Vanity | Siouxsie Chow | 4 | "Empire", "Retribution", "United", "Legacy" | 2015 |
| Revenge | Phoebe | 1 | "Retaliation" | 2015 |
| Classic Alice | Beth Marmie | 2 | "Bleak House", "Why Can't the English" | 2014 |
| Video Game High School | Duchess of Kart | 5 | "The N64", "OMGWTFPS?!", "Some Like It Bot", "You Can't Stop a Sandwich", "Welcome to Varsity" | 2013-2014 |
| Emma Approved | Emma Woodhouse | 80 | All Episodes | 2013-2014, 2018 |
| Rizzoli & Isles | Staff Member | 1 | "Too Good to Be True" | 2014 |
| Criminal Minds: Suspect Behavior | Lisa | 1 | "Jane" | 2011 |

=== Voice-over work ===
Sotomura voiced Everlyn 'Boats' Sotomura in Call of Duty: Infinite Warfare.
