= Ashley Clements =

American actress

- Born: San Francisco, California, U.S.
- Education: University of San Diego
- Occupation: Actress
- Years active: 2009–present
- Known for: The Lizzie Bennet Diaries
- Website: Official Website

Ashley Clements is an American actress. She starred as Lizzie Bennet in the Emmy-winning web series The Lizzie Bennet Diaries.

== Career ==
Ashley Clements attended the University of San Diego and earned her MFA in Acting from the Old Globe. She appeared in many stage productions.

She auditioned for The Lizzie Bennet Diaries in December 2011, and was selected for the lead role. The Lizzie Bennet Diaries is a web series adapted from Pride and Prejudice. The Lizzie Bennet Diaries won an Emmy Award for the "Best Original Interactive Program". In September 2014, Clements won the Best Actress in a Drama Streamy Award for her role as Lizzie Bennet.

Clements has also starred in The Mortician (2012) and the web series Just Go with It (2015). She has performed in web and TV advertisements, and has narrated audiobooks, among them The Secret Diary of Lizzie Bennet.

In 2016, Clements joined the cast of Edgar Allan Poe's Murder Mystery Dinner Party, where she plays author Charlotte Brontë and also appeared in the romantic comedy film Non-Transferable.

In 2017, she starred in the Tin Can Brothers' stage production The Solve-It Squad Returns as Gwen. She reprised the role when the show was performed Off-Broadway in New York in 2018. She played Gwen again in the Web Series “The Solve It Squad: Back In Biz” in 2022. In 2020, She starred in Ore-Ida's "Just crack an egg" commercial.
