= Brendan Bradley (actor) =

American actor

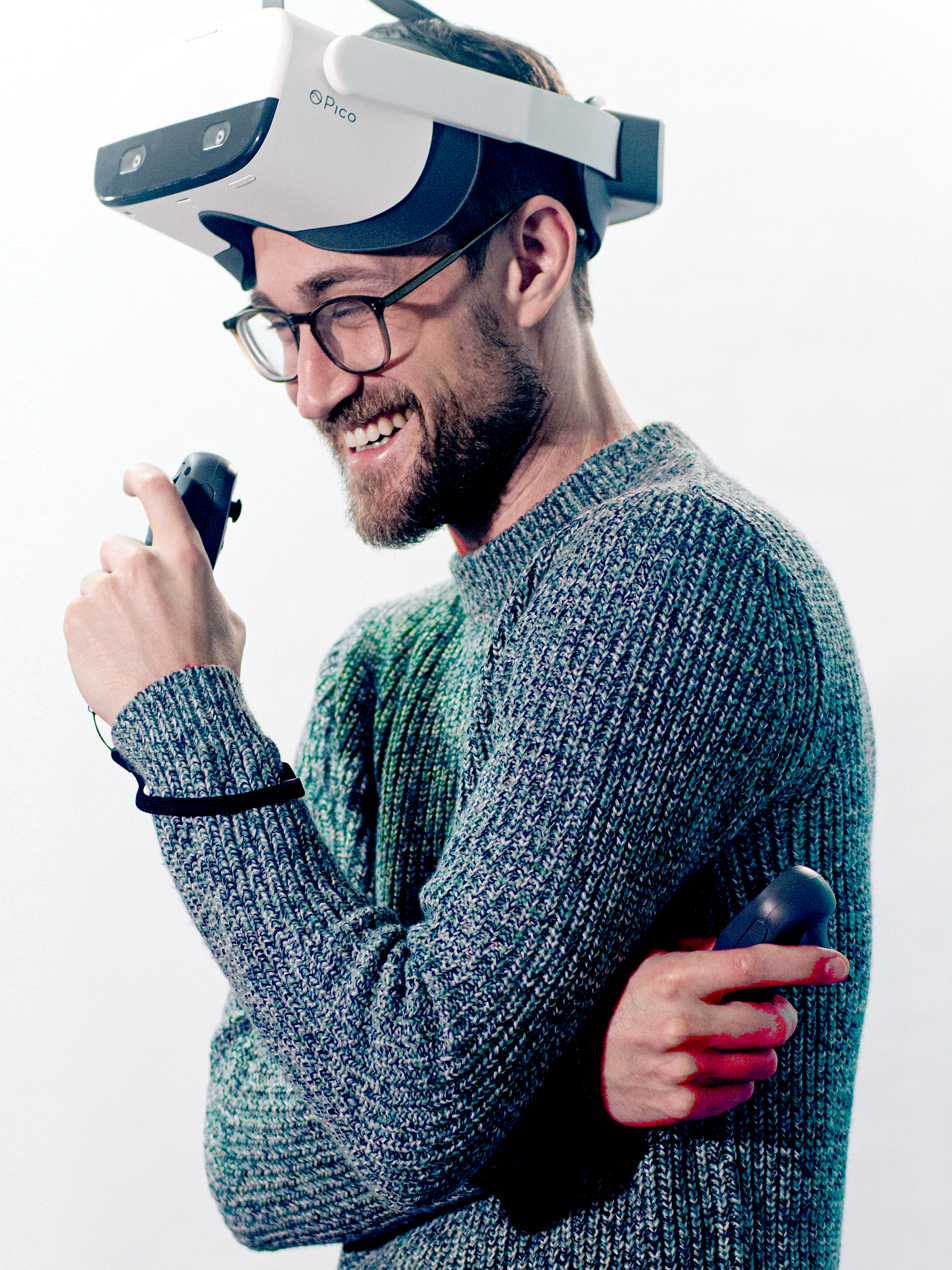
- Born: Brendan Bradley; Durham, North Carolina, U.S.
- Occupations: Actor, director, producer, screenwriter
- Years active: 2006-present

Brendan Bradley is an American actor, director, producer, writer and VR performer. He portrayed the advertising character Guy in radio and television commercials for Staples. He has worked in over 100 television, film, video game, and interactive projects.

He has written and directed films, stage plays, virtual reality, musicals, and series including Jettison, Non-Player Character Musical, the comedy series Squatters, Video Game Reunion and Non-Transferable and A Tale Told By An Idiot, both films which he also directed. He also served as the director and producer of Assassin's Creed: The Musical, SONA, and Baby X. Bradley became more known during the 2023 SAG-AFTRA strike for social media videos.

He founded The Innovation Lab at New York University's Tisch School of the Arts. He has done work in live immersive theater in virtual reality.

== Early life and education ==
Bradley was born and raised in Durham, North Carolina. He began acting in plays at Raleigh Little Theater and produced his first play during his senior year of high school.

He was an early member of RASH! Theater Company (2002–2005), producing works such as Goonies: The Musical.

Bradley graduated from Durham Academy in Durham, North Carolina with a high school degree, and received a Bachelor of Fine Arts Degree with Honors in Theater from New York University's Tisch School of the Arts. He furthered his studies at the Lee Strasberg Theatre and Film Institute and the Royal Academy of Dramatic Art in London, focusing on Shakespeare in Performance.

== Career ==
=== 2005–2015: Early roles and breakthrough ===
Bradley began his career in New York City theatre, originating roles in theatre productions like Slasher and Venezuela. He then took on leading film roles in Friends With Benefits, Redwoods, and Colin Bannon's Love Conquers Paul (2009), winning Best Actor at the Method Fest Independent Film Festival.

His first play, Jettison, was commissioned by Impetuous Theater Group for Swim Shorts 3 - a one-act play festival held on a Manhattan rooftop swimming pool - and later published and produced in Miami. Jettison was published in One Acts of Note in 2009 by Desert Road Publishing, and was produced as part of The Signature Shorts Series at Arsht Center in Miami.

His breakthrough came with the web series, Squatters (2010–2012), DailyMotion's first original comedy series, which earned acclaim from NPR's The Story with Dick Gordon and TubeFilter News and led to further YouTube collaborations. Bradley made his television debut with the web series The Legend of Neil, which was syndicated on Comedy Central.

In 2013, Bradley starred in the viral parody series, School of Thrones as Renly Baratheon. Shortly after in 2014, Bradley directed and produced Assassin's Creed The Musical for Machinima. The project was acquired by Rooster Teeth in 2019.

Bradley appeared as Eli Lavenza in Frankenstein, MD (2014), a modern adaptation of Elizabeth Lavenza, from Mary Shelley's 1818 novel Frankenstein. Soon after, Bradley began to work on network TV roles in shows such as Wizards of Waverly Place and Death Valley.

=== 2015-2020 Commercial Success ===
Bradley began his role as Guy, the quirky, fast-talking Staples clerk in a series of commercials in January 2015, and portrayed the face-talking salesman named Guy in a series of TV and Radio commercials for Staples, Inc. through 2017.

He continued his work with a role in CBS's Elementary and Doubt in 2015. He had a recurring role in Tyler Perry's The Haves And The Have Nots, and ABC's American Housewife.

In 2017, he starred in, In Vino, opposite Ed Asner and Sean Young and debuted his first feature film as a writer-director, Non-Transferable that same year. Bradley also created an animated adaptation of the short story, X: A Fabulous Child's Story and a follow-up short film, Baby S.

Bradley directed and starred in the sci-fi series SONA (2017), which was picked up by Legendary Entertainment. For its San Diego Comic-Con launch, he designed a virtual reality escape room experience.

In 2018, Bradley began writing, producing and directing A Tale Told By An Idiot, a modern adaptation of Shakespeare's Macbeth parodying virtual reality and cryptocurrency gaming. The mixed media project experimented with live action film, motion capture and 3D animation.

Bradley's third feature film screenplay, The Plus One was directed by Erik White, starring Ashanti, Cedric The Entertainer, and himself.

=== 2020-2025: Pioneering during the pandemic ===
During the COVID-19 pandemic, Bradley pioneered live theatre in virtual reality. He had previously founded The Innovation Lab at New York University's Tisch School of the Arts to integrate emerging technologies into live performance training. When schools and theater shut down during COVID-19, the Lab pivoted for students to attend, learn and perform in virtual reality. Bradley then launched The Future Stages on Mozilla Hubs, a free 3D virtual theater.

Bradley appeared as a motion capture performer and voice performer in Resident Evil: Village for Capcom. In October 2020, he adapted Jettison at Future Stages, becoming a finalist for the Innovation Award at the 32nd Producers Guild of America Awards.

During the 2020 shutdown, Bradley live-streamed a one-man show, seamlessly switching between 5 modes of AR/VR/XR/MR/2D storytelling for The Museum of Science, including live theater in web-based virtual reality (WebVR).

In the following years, Bradley became the co-founder of The 5th Wall Forum and OnBoardXR (2021-2023), supporting digital live arts projects. Bradley began developing the interactive virtual reality musical Non-Player Character Musical which workshopped at the Mugar Omni IMAX Theater and premiered at the 2024 Edinburgh Fringe Festival. He produced and performed a live halftime show in VR at The Polys XR Awards. The musical allowed on-site audiences to experience either as a Participant of the VR Concert, wearing a VR headset, or as a seated Spectator watching the experience projected onto the IMAX dome screen. Bradley workshopped and expanded the Non-Player Character VR Musical, performing live at FIVARS, Mozilla Festival, winning Best in VR Interactive Immersive Experience at The Queensland (Qld) XR Festival and nominated for The Indie Creator Auggie Award at Augmented World Expo as part of OnBoardXR.

He starred in Ferryman Collective's VRChat play Severance Theory: Welcome To Respite (2021), performing live at The Venice Film Fest, Raindance Immersive, and the Kaohsiung Film Festival. He also played roles in Gumball Dreams at SXSW and Uncanny Alley: A New Day (2024) at The Venice Film Fest.

=== 2025-present ===
Bradley starred in Succubus opposite Ron Perlman and Rosanna Arquette. Shortly after, his American gothic musical, The Devil and the Daylong Brothers, premiered at the SAG-AFTRA Foundation with a live performance from Keith Carradine. He continued his work with roles in 9-1-1 for ABC and The Studio for Apple.

At the 78th Primetime Emmy Awards, Bradley and his fellow Ferryman Collective members accepted the Primetime Emmy Award for Outstanding Emerging Media Program for Uncanny Alley: A New Day.

== Music ==
Bradley released his single "Reprogram Me" from the recording of Non-Player Character, which debuted at number 25 on the U.S. iTunes Soundtrack Chart. An original Workshop cast album recorded at Clear Lake and Fever Recording Studios with Producer and Arranger Maurice Soque Jr. was released September 2, 2022.

== Filmography ==
=== Television ===
Year	Title	Role	Notes
2020	Wayward Guide	Odie Doty	
2019	The Haves and the Have Nots	Agent Welles / Officer Welles	3 episodes
2018	Sona	Akiva	6 episodes
2018	Timeless	Daly	Episode: Mrs. Sherlock Holmes
2017	Doubt	Hayden	Episode: Running Out of Time
2016	The Haves and the Have Nots	Officer Welles	Episode: "It's Ok to Love"
2016	Sing It!	Eli Savage	2 episodes
2015	Elementary	Timothy Wagner/Otto Neuhaus/Evan Farrow	Episode: "Tag, You're Me"
2015	Muzzled the Musical	Prince Dashing	3 episodes
2014	Frankenstein, MD	Eli Lavenza	13 episodes
2013	Mr. Box Office	Lars Frankenheimer	Episode: "Fifty Shades of Gray Hair"
2013	School of Thrones	Renly Baratheon	3 episodes
2012	NCIS	Guest	Episode: "Devil's Trifecta "
2012	Wizards of Waverly Place	Hank Russo	Episode: "Rock Around the Clock"
2011	Death Valley	Officer Brown	Episode: "Assault on Precinct UTF"
2010	Squatters	Hank Pitman	Series Regular, Writer, Director
2009	The Legend of Neil	Male Fairy	3 Episodes

=== Film ===
Year	Title	Role	Notes
2024	Succubus	Chris	
2020	Inner Child	Zeke	
2017	In Vino	Jean	
2016	Non-Transferable	Josh Merit	Also director
2015	An American in Hollywood	Eric	
2015	Wake (cancelled)	Enoch	
2014	Hate from a Distance	Ned	
2010	The Last Harbor	Ken Sikorski	
2009	Friends (With Benefits)	Brad	
2009	Love Conquers Paul	Paul	
2008	September 12th	Daniel	
2008	Redwoods	Everet	

== Recognition ==
Brendan was interviewed on National Public Radio's The Story with Dick Gordon on September 9, 2009, about his experiences writing and producing online commercials and entertainment. The Method Fest Independent Film Festival recognized his performance in September 12 by giving him the Best Actor Award in 2009.
