= Emma Approved =

American web series

- Genre: Comedy
- Created by: Bernie Su
- Written by: Bernie Su; Tracy Bitterolf; Tamara Krinsky; Angelique Hanus; Ana Ávila; Julie Benson; Shawna Benson; Kate Rorick; Margaret Dunlap
- Directed by: Bernie Su
- Starring: Joanna Sotomura; Brent Bailey; Dayeanne Hutton; James Brent Isaacs; Stephen A. Chang; Tyra Colar; Alexis Boozer; Paul Stuart; Gabriel Voss; Mapuana Makia; Nikea Gamby-Turner; Jessica Andres
- Country of origin: United States
- Original language: English
- No. of episodes: 72 (list of episodes)

Production
- Executive producers: Hank Green; Bernie Su
- Production locations: Santa Monica, California
- Running time: 4-8 minutes per episode

Original release
- Network: YouTube
- Release: October 7, 2013 – August 23, 2014

Emma Approved was an American multi-platform web series starring Joanna Sotomura and Brent Bailey based on Jane Austen’s 1815 novel Emma. The show is a follow-up to The Lizzie Bennet Diaries and is the third production out of web series company and YouTube channel, Pemberley Digital. In the series, Emma Woodhouse is reimagined as a lifestyle coach and matchmaker who is filming herself for the future documentary about her life. Emma Approved aired twice weekly on Pemberley Digital's YouTube channel starting October 7, 2013. The show consisted of 72 episodes, ranging from five to seven minutes in length. The series ended on August 23, 2014 and has accumulated over 3 million views on the Pemberley Digital YouTube channel. On September 19, 2018, a video featuring Sotomura and Bailey as Emma and Alex announced that a continuation of the series would be starting in October 2018. Due to lack of funding raised from online sources – such as GoFundMe – the sequel series ended after just seventeen episodes, with the new story left incomplete.

== Plot ==
The series focuses on the life of Emma Woodhouse and takes place at the offices of her eponymous lifestyle company, Emma Approved, an all-in-one lifestyle coaching, matchmaking, and event planning company. Emma decides to document her business successes (to the chagrin of her business partner Alex Knightley). Alex forces Emma to hire an assistant: Harriet Smith. When best friend Annie Taylor announces she wants to call off her wedding to Emma Approved client Ryan Weston, Harriet and Emma convince Ryan's step-brother Frank Churchill to send a wedding gift because he can’t make it and the wedding is back on.

Harriet has a crush on Emma Approved's IT guy Bobby Martin, but Emma doesn’t approve the match and thinks Harriet can do better. Emma plans to set Harriet up with Emma Approved's newest client, Senator James Elton, but he likes Emma and thinks Harriet is below him. Elton leaves Emma Approved as a client when Emma rebuffs him. Emma takes a break from the company. When she returns, Izzy Knightley arrives, Emma's sister and Alex's sister-in-law. Turns out, Izzy isn’t feeling heard by her husband John. Emma's meddling almost breaks the couple up, but eventually Izzy reveals what she really wants: to go back to school. Meanwhile, Harriet starts a music club (playing ukulele).

Alex finds Emma's next client: Maddy Bates, whose accounting business is struggling. Emma decides to throw an elite fundraiser in order for Maddy gain more clients, and Frank Churchill arrives to help. Senator Elton returns to ask Emma Approved to plan his engagement party to Caroline Lee. Hating the experience with the Eltons, Emma decides to change the direction of the company and focus on high-profile charity causes. They hire Jane Fairfax to help, Maddy Bates’ niece and Emma's self-identified rival. They put together a Bachelor/Bachelorette Auction for human rights as their first cause.

Emma decides to throw a baby shower for Annie at the same time that Emma Approved gets another benefit: the opening of Boxx, a celebrity-led restaurant. Emma gets too distracted by the Boxx Hill event and ends up missing most of Annie's baby shower. Though the event is a success, Emma's and Frank's behavior toward Maddy and her homemade preserves in front of the celebrity guests at the opening event disgusts Jane and Alex, who both leave the company.

Emma apologizes to Maddy, and then to Annie, who reveals Frank and Jane were secretly together and that Frank sold his company. When Emma tells Harriet, Harriet tells Emma that she likes Alex. Emma realizes she has feelings for Alex, and apologizes once and for all to Bobby Martin for pushing him away from Harriet. Alex returns to Emma Approved and confesses to Emma that he is in love with her. They kiss. Emma approaches Harriet with the news that she and Alex are now together. Harriet reveals she still has feelings for Bobby Martin. She and Emma organize a surprise for him, and Harriet and Bobby kiss.

The second series opens five years later; Emma is slipping back to her less-confident self after the failed engagement of Anne Elliot and Mr. Wentworth. The company is overburdened with going public, and a full documentary crew is filming their progress. Alex approaches Emma with a new client for her to focus on: Ricky Collins.

== Format ==
The story is told in a vlog-style format from the point of view of the eponymous character, Emma Woodhouse. Each episode is between four and eight minutes. The show takes place entirely in the Emma Approved offices, where there are cameras set up in Emma's office and at Alex's, Harriet's and Jane's desks. Emma also speaks with clients and colleagues through video chat.

A second channel under Emma's full name includes supplementary videos to the main story. These videos include Harriet's initial application video to become Emma's assistant, a series of six question and answer videos featuring various cast members, a video by Martin confessing to Harriet that he likes her, and Harriet's Music Club videos which she starts after episode 32, though her first "song" (for Senator James Elton) appears after episode 21.

After episode 67, a short series following Frank Churchill and Jane Fairfax's flirting in the office (comprising nine under-two-minute episodes) was released entitled "Frank and Jane" on the main channel.

== Characters ==
- Emma Woodhouse (Joanna Sotomura) is an ambitious, confident lifestyle coach, event planner and match maker. She believes that she's going to be the next Oprah, and so begins documenting her "greatness" for when she becomes famous. She starts out the series self-centered and oblivious to her own extremely privileged perspective, but grows to see her own shortcomings. Though she is often misguided, she has a big heart and is always trying to do what's best for the people around her. She has several catchphrases, like calling things "Emma approved" and asserting she's going to "make your life better."
- Alex Knightley (Brent Bailey; George Knightley in the novel) is Emma's business partner and head of finance for Emma Approved. He is the voice of reason in Emma's life and shows her extreme patience. Emma often teases him for his poor sense of style, but he's able to tease her right back with his characteristic snark. Alex spends much of the series struggling to hide his romantic feelings for Emma.
- Harriet Smith (Dayeanne Hutton) is Emma's new assistant. She has a degree in library science and hopes to be a lifestyle expert like Emma. Harriet is extremely good hearted, if a little ditzy. Emma spends a lot of the series trying to mold Harriet in her own image, only to find that Harriet is best when she's being herself.
- Bobby Martin (James Brent Isaacs; Robert Martin in the novel) is Emma Approved's sweet and bumbling IT guy. He has feelings for Harriet, but Emma disapproves of the match and convinces Harriet to reject his advances. He enjoys bird-watching and poker and goes by the nickname B-Mart.
- Frank Churchill (Stephen A. Chang) is a high-profile entrepreneur who is constantly jetsetting to other countries to do business. Emma often relies on his celebrity and money to pull her out of trouble. He is boyish and charming and seems to have natural chemistry with Emma.
- Jane Fairfax (Tyra Colar) is an old friend of Emma's family. Since she is so successful and close in age to Emma, Emma feels a natural rivalry with Jane. Later in the series, Jane joins Emma Approved to help organize charity-related events.
- Annie Taylor (Alexis Boozer; Anne Taylor in the novel) is Emma's best friend. Emma has helped orchestrate all the major events in Annie's life, from meeting her future husband to her wedding day to her baby shower.
- James Elton (Paul Stuart; Philip Elton in the novel) is a California senator who comes to Emma to find him a match.
- Ryan Weston (Gabriel Voss; Mr. Weston in the novel) is a cupcake mogul and one of Emma's matchmaking clients. Emma matches him with Annie Taylor. They are happily married and expecting a child.
- Izzy Knightley (Mapuana Makia; Isabella Knightley in the novel) is Emma's older sister who is married to Alex's brother. She is a housewife with two kids, but is unhappy and restless. Emma helps her realize that she wants to go back to school.
- Maddy Bates (Nikea Gamby-Turner; Miss Bates in the novel) is a close friend of Emma's family and Jane Fairfax's aunt. Emma helps her find clients for her financial consulting business. Maddy makes jams in her spare time and likes nothing better than talking about Jane.
- Caroline Lee (Jessica Andres) is crossover role from The Lizzie Bennet Diaries. She replaces Augusta Hawkins in the original novel. Caroline is James Elton's new fiancé. Emma helps the couple plan their engagement party.

== Reception ==
Initial response to Pemberley's Emma character was mixed due to her tendency toward "unlikable" self-confidence and large ego, though the first two episodes garnered over 120,000 views in the show's first week. By early January (three months into the series), Emma had won over her audience with her caring for those around her. Emma Approved's viewership was only about 80% that of Pemberley's predecessor series The Lizzie Bennet Diaries, but unlike that series, all of Emma's transmedia storytelling was monetized using brand integration including companies such as Modcloth and Samsung.

The romantic leads, Joanna Sotomura and Brent Bailey, gained some attention for becoming a real couple during the run of the show, leading to their own fan following and the portmanteau "Brentanna."

== Awards and nominations ==
Awards and nominations for Emma Approved
Year	Award	Category	Result	Nominee(s)
2014
2014	IAWTV Awards	Best Comedy Series	Nominated	
2014	IAWTV Awards	Best Female Performance: Comedy	Nominated	Joanna Sotomura
2014	IAWTV Awards	Best Ensemble Cast	Nominated	
2014	Streamy Awards	Audience Choice	Finalist	
2014	Streamy Awards	Best Actress in a Comedy	Nominated	Joanna Sotomura
2014	Streamy Awards	Best Actor in a Comedy	Nominated	Brent Bailey
2014	Cynopsis Digital Model D Awards	Web Series Comedy	Nominated	
2015	Creative Arts Emmy Award	Outstanding Original Interactive Program	Won	Bernie Su, Tamara Krinsky, Alexandra Edwards, Tracy Bitterolf, Kate Rorick
