= The Lizzie Bennet Diaries =

American web series

- Promotional poster
- Genre: Drama
- Created by: Hank Green; Bernie Su
- Based on: Pride and Prejudice by Jane Austen
- Written by: Bernie Su; Margaret Dunlap; Rachel Kiley; Jay Bushman; Kate Rorick; Anne Toole
- Directed by: Bernie Su; Margaret Dunlap
- Starring: Ashley Clements; Julia Cho; Daniel Vincent Gordh; Laura Spencer; Mary Kate Wiles
- Theme music composer: Michael Aranda
- Country of origin: United States
- Original language: English
- No. of episodes: 100 (list of episodes)

Production
- Executive producers: Hank Green; Bernie Su
- Producer: Jenni Powell
- Production locations: Los Angeles, California
- Running time: 2–8 minutes per episode
- Production company: Pemberley Digital

Original release
- Network: YouTube
- Release: April 9, 2012 – March 28, 2013

The Lizzie Bennet Diaries is an American web series adapted from Jane Austen's 1813 novel Pride and Prejudice. The story is conveyed in the form of vlogs. It was created by Hank Green and Bernie Su, produced by Jenni Powell and stars Ashley Clements, Mary Kate Wiles, Laura Spencer, Julia Cho and Daniel Vincent Gordh. It premiered on a dedicated YouTube channel on April 9, 2012, and subsequently concluded when the 100th episode was posted on March 28, 2013.

In 2013, The Lizzie Bennet Diaries became the first web series to win an Emmy, for Outstanding Creative Achievement in Interactive Media – Original Interactive Program.

== Format ==
The story is told in vlog-style by the eponymous character; each episode is between two and eight minutes long. As the show primarily takes place in Lizzie's bedroom, many major events happen offscreen and are retold by Lizzie, with her friend Charlotte and sisters Lydia and Jane adding different perspectives. Occasionally they perform reenactments, using a recurring costume to denote who's who (such as a cap and bowtie for Darcy, a blue plaid shirt for Lizzie, etc.). From Episode 25 onwards, the show begins to visit other sets, allowing them to introduce outside characters, such as Bing Lee, Caroline, and Mr. Collins.

There are also semi-frequent Q&A videos, once per every ten episodes, in which Lizzie answers questions asked by real viewers, sometimes with the help of another character. In addition to the videos, all the characters also have various social media accounts, through which they interact and reveal portions of the story and perspectives that are not necessarily represented in Lizzie's vlogs.

== Plot ==
Elizabeth "Lizzie" Bennet is a mass communications graduate student still living at home with her parents and two sisters, the sweet, timid Jane and rebellious, party-loving Lydia. With the help of her friend Charlotte Lu, she starts a vlog series for her thesis, discussing the trials and tribulations of her daily life. Wealthy medical student Bing Lee moves into the Netherfield mansion nearby, bringing with him his even richer friend William Darcy. Mrs Bennet quickly begins conspiring to match Bing up with one of the girls, believing "it's a truth universally acknowledged that a single man in possession of a good fortune must be in want of a wife." When the Bennets finally meet the new neighbors at a wedding, Jane and Bing instantly have chemistry, but Darcy's rude and snobbish behaviour causes Lizzie to dislike him.

At VidCon, Charlotte and Lizzie run into childhood friend Ricky Collins, who now runs online media company "Collins and Collins," with the help of his wealthy patron Ms Catherine de Bourgh. He proposes Lizzie join him as a business partner, but she declines. Charlotte accepts the offer in her place. During this time Lydia starts her own vlog series.

While at a bar with Lydia, Lizzie meets swim coach George Wickham and begins seeing him. He reveals Darcy was a family friend who supposedly refused to give him a college fund he was promised, furthering Lizzie's poor opinion of the man. Lizzie quickly moves on when it becomes apparent George isn't that into her. Though their relationship had been going well, Bing suddenly leaves for L.A. without telling Jane. Lizzie assumes Darcy must have poisoned Bing's opinion of her sister.

Lizzie decides to spend her last semester shadowing at companies, starting with C&C. There she runs into Darcy, who's been asked to monitor the company by his aunt, Catherine. He confronts Lizzie and reveals he's in love with her. She furiously tells him she could never love him back, because of his rudeness and how he's hurt George and Jane, accidentally revealing the existence of the vlogs in the process.

After watching them all, he gives her a letter explaining his side of things. He steered Bing away from Jane because he thought she was only being nice. George was given enough money to pay his full college tuition, but spent it all in one year and then became angry when Darcy refused to give him more.

Lydia misinterprets one of Lizzie's 21st birthday presents and storms off to Las Vegas for New Years, and eventually begins dating George Wickham.

Lizzie discovers the final company she's to visit, Pemberley Digital, belongs to Darcy. They begin spending time together, now on better terms, but their growing friendship is cut short when Lizzie has to rush home, having been informed there's a website counting down to the release of a sex tape involving George and Lydia. Lizzie and Lydia haven't spoken since Christmas. When Lizzie confronts Lydia, it transpires Lydia didn't know about the website.

Jane urges Lizzie to watch all of Lydia's videos, after which Lizzie realizes her younger sister isn't as shallow as she thought and that she doesn't really know Lydia all that well. Lydia herself realizes she's been selfish and breaks down crying in Lizzie's arms and the two sisters reconcile. The day the sex-tape is meant to go live, the website disappears.

During her healing journey, Lydia discovers that Darcy has bought the company that owns the website and all rights to the video. Lizzie realizes she loves him, but thinks it's come too late. Bing returns to apologize; he discovered Lizzie's vlogs and saw how much Jane cared about him in them, and the two get back together. Darcy confesses to Lizzie that he still loves her, and the two finally get together. Lizzie decides what to do in her professional life and decides to stop vlogging so she can focus on actually living her life.

== Characters ==
- Elizabeth "Lizzie" Bennet (Ashley Clements; Elizabeth Bennet in the novel) is the middle Bennet sister and the narrator of most of the vlogs. She is a graduate student studying mass communications and, like her original counterpart, believes women should be highly educated and do more with their lives than simply pursue husbands. She is very close with her best friend, Charlotte Lu, who was born on the same day as she, as well as her older sister, Jane, while appearing to have a more strained relationship with her younger sister, Lydia. While it is clear that she cares for her family and friends, she can also be fairly prejudiced and quick to judge people who she perceives as condescending or a threat to her way of life, such as Darcy and, at first, Bing Lee.
- Charlotte Lu (Julia Cho; Charlotte Lucas in the novel) is Lizzie's best friend and often the director/editor of her vlog. Charlotte wants to be a filmmaker and convinced Lizzie to start her vlog as part of a school project. While the original character of Charlotte Lucas from the books is a minor character, Lu's role in The Lizzie Bennet Diaries has been greatly expanded; she appears in many of the beginning episodes, and, according to both Lizzie and Jane, practically lives at the Bennet house. Charlotte and Lizzie have a falling out after Charlotte accepts Ricky Collins' job offer (which Lizzie originally turned down), but the two soon reconcile.
- Jane Bennet (Laura Spencer) is the eldest of the Bennet children, and an overworked, underpaid merchandise coordinator in the fashion world. She is incredibly polite, sweet and, according to Lizzie, "practically perfect in every way." When Bing Lee moves into town, Jane is immediately smitten with him, much to the absolute joy of her mother. Jane is devastated by Bing's sudden departure. She moves to Los Angeles for both a new job and the hope of reconnecting with Bing. She later returns to her home to support her sister Lydia through her difficulties. After this is resolved, Jane is offered a new job in New York City and reconciles with Bing.
- Lydia Britney Bennet (Mary Kate Wiles) is the youngest Bennet child, currently attending community college. She is "feisty, energetic, and unapologetic." Lizzie, somewhat less kindly, describes her as "too old to be on any reality shows about having babies in high school." She has also created a series of her own videos starring herself, her cousin Mary, and her cat, Kitty. On the occasion of her 21st birthday in December 2012, she and Lizzie get into a bitter argument about Lydia's perceived immaturity, and Lydia makes plans to vacation in Las Vegas for New Year's Eve, where she meets George Wickham and begins dating. Later, after being the victim of George Wickham's money-making site, she makes up with her sisters.
- Bing Lee (Christopher Sean; Charles Bingley in the novel) is a young, wealthy Asian-American medical student who has moved into The Netherfield House in the same neighborhood as the Bennets. He quickly falls for Jane Bennet and begins to date her. Bing abruptly leaves Netherfield and Jane by returning to Los Angeles, breaking Jane's heart, after Darcy suggests that Jane is only engaging in a relationship with him for his money and Caroline tells him that Jane flirted with another guy at his birthday party. However, after a run-in with Lizzie during her time at Pemberley Digital, he makes a return, having quit medical school to pursue his own passions. He and Jane move to New York together in episode 92.
- Caroline Lee (Jessica Jade Andres; Caroline Bingley in the novel) is Bing Lee's sister. She is aware of Lizzie's vlog diaries and appears to help Lizzie keep Bing and Darcy from discovering them during Lizzie and Jane's stay at Netherfield. She has a romantic interest in William Darcy, although her feelings aren't reciprocated. She is later revealed to have attempted to manipulate events to keep Bing and Jane apart, as well as (to a lesser extent) stymie Darcy's feelings for Lizzie. Caroline reappears in the sequel, Emma Approved, as Senator James Elton's fiancé, replacing Augusta Elton, the original wife of Philip Elton, from the novel.
- Ricky Collins (Maxwell Glick; William Collins in the novel) is a former classmate of Lizzie and Charlotte's, who asks that he be addressed only as Mr. Collins. He has formed an alliance with venture capitalist Catherine de Bourgh, to attempt a foray into the world of web video. Mr. Collins frequently visits the Bennets while in town for a few weeks and, near the end of his stay, offers Lizzie a lucrative job at his company, Collins and Collins. Lizzie turns him down, so he offers the job to Charlotte, who accepts. This decision causes a brief but bitter argument between the two best friends, but they reconcile after Charlotte invites Lizzie to visit Collins & Collins (in the fictional town of Hunsford, California), where Lizzie also learns to tolerate Mr. Collins.
- William Darcy (Daniel Vincent Gordh; Fitzwilliam Darcy in the novel) is Bing Lee's best friend and the wealthy heir to an entertainment corporation called Pemberley Digital. He stays with Bing and Caroline at Netherfield until they all leave for Los Angeles. He first meets Lizzie at a wedding, and she overheard him telling Bing that she was "decent enough", which is when her dislike towards him starts. He is described by Lizzie as a snobby and condescending robot, and Jane has difficulty coming up with a flattering descriptor of him, beyond "tall"; Charlotte, however, believes that Darcy has a crush on Lizzie. For a long time, second-hand characterization is all the audience has to go by, as Darcy is referred to but never seen, making his first appearance in episodes 59 (only from the neck down) and 60, where he confirms Charlotte's suspicions by confessing his love for Lizzie.
- George Wickham (Wes Aderhold) is the coach of a university swim team who forms a short-lived romantic attachment with Lizzie. He claims that though he and Darcy were childhood friends, Darcy ruined his life by withholding money Darcy's father had promised, thereby ending George's hopes of a college education. He leaves town for work, eventually re-entering the story after New Year's Day, where he meets and becomes romantically involved with Lydia, as chronicled in her spin-off videos. At the same time, Lizzie learns that George gambled away all the money the elder Darcy left for him, and then took advantage of Gigi Darcy, William's sister, for more. Finally, he attempts to exploit "YouTube Star Lydia Bennet" by releasing a sex tape of the two of them online.
- Fitz Williams (Craig Frank; Col. Fitzwilliam in the novel) is Darcy's friend and colleague. Lizzie meets him while dining with Catherine de Bourgh, Darcy's aunt and Charlotte's boss. He has a boyfriend, Brandon, whose name was officially confirmed on Fitz's Twitter, and is particularly good at making care-packages.
- Georgiana "Gigi" Darcy (Allison Paige; Georgiana Darcy in the novel) is William Darcy's younger sister and a graphic designer at Pemberley Digital. Her first appearance in The Lizzie Bennet Diaries was Episode 77. She is aware of the video diaries, and claims to like them. She and George Wickham were romantically involved, but this ended when William proved that George was taking advantage of her for the money. Twitter posts between Gigi and Fitz suggest that she actively tries to push Lizzie and Darcy together. She is also instrumental in helping to end George's money-making plot: though the website itself did not list his name and George had stopped returning calls, he answers Gigi when she calls him, allowing Fitz and Darcy to track him down. Thereafter Darcy bought out the company which owned the rights to the sex tape, preventing it from ever being released.
- Mrs. Bennet is Lizzie's mother. She appears to be a traditional Southern woman, eager to see her daughters married and interested in little else besides neighborhood gossip. She is almost always impersonated by Lizzie.
- Mr. Bennet is Lizzie's father. He appears more calm and levelheaded than his wife, though one of his favorite activities, according to Lizzie, is winding her up. He has a special fondness for bonsai trees and prepares a train extravaganza every Christmas. He is often impersonated by Charlotte and Lydia.
- Catherine de Bourgh (Lady Catherine de Bourgh in the novel) is Darcy's aunt and an extremely wealthy venture capitalist who is the primary investor in Collins & Collins, the new media firm run by Mr. Collins, where Charlotte accepts a job offer after Lizzie rejected it. Catherine is very attached to her sickly dog who she calls Annie Kins. She is quick with her opinions and judgements. Charlotte said that Catherine is "on Team Caroline," meaning that she wants her nephew to be with Caroline. She is impersonated by Lizzie, and Ashley Clements says her impression is a combination of Julia Child, Miranda Priestly and Dolores Umbridge.
- Mary Bennet (Briana Cuoco) is Lydia, Jane, and Lizzie's cousin who has appeared sporadically in Lydia's vlogs and once in Lizzie's. She becomes better friends and occasional tutor with Lydia while Lydia is staying at her house despite their opposing personalities. She is often the "forgotten" character and her Twitter reads, "I am Mary, never forgotten." Mary also has a boyfriend by the name of Eddie (a subtle nod to the character of Edmund Bertram from Austen's Mansfield Park.) In the novel, she is actually one of the five Bennet sisters, being the middle sister between Elizabeth and Kitty.
- Kitty Bennet (Rosie of House Wiles) is Lydia's cat who appears in Lydia's vlogs. In the novel, she is actually one of the five Bennet sisters, being the second youngest after Lydia.

== Spin-offs ==
In addition to Lizzie's vlogging, other characters also released videos which provided access to alternate perspectives and story elements.

=== The Lydia Bennet ===
Lydia decides to start her own vlog series while Lizzie is away. As its main purpose is to show Lydia's story arc when she can't appear on the main webshow, it's only ever maintained when she and Lizzie are apart, such as when Lizzie is staying at Netherfield or visiting companies. It allows the audience to witness things like Lydia becoming friends with her cousin Mary, running away to LA to see her sister Jane, meeting George Wickham in Las Vegas on New Year's Eve, and having a relationship with him. Unlike the main webshow, Lydia's vlogs are not stationary, are all one single continuous take (presumably as Lydia would consider learning how to edit a nerdy thing to do), and rarely ever set in the same place twice.

=== Maria of the Lu ===
After beginning her job at Collins and Collins, Charlotte gets her younger sister Maria Lu a summer internship, who documents the experience in a series of video diaries.

=== Collins and Collins ===
Mr. Collins's company produces instructional videos called "Better Living with Collins and Collins." Currently, there are eight episodes.

=== Pemberley Digital ===
Hosted by Darcy's younger sister Gigi, Pemberley Digital posts demo videos to unveil and promote their new prototype: "Domino," an application that can automatically edit and upload videos recorded on it. This premise allows the audience to see Darcy and Gigi's efforts to track down George Wickham and get his website taken down, before he releases a sex tape he filmed involving Lydia.

== Sequels ==
=== Welcome to Sanditon ===
Taking place after the events of The Lizzie Bennet Diaries, Welcome to Sanditon follows Gigi Darcy as she spends her summer in Sanditon, CA to run a beta demo of the Pemberley Digital Domino application. The residents of Sanditon have all been invited to join in the test, and discover how this “life-revealing” app performs.

The mini-series is a modernized adaptation of Jane Austen's unfinished novel, Sanditon. One notable difference from the source material is Gigi replaces the unfinished novel's original heroine, Charlotte Heywood (as Sanditon is actually not connected to Pride and Prejudice in any way).

=== Emma Approved ===
Taking place after the events of Welcome to Sanditon, Emma Approved focuses on Emma Woodhouse, a confident and proud female entrepreneur who believes she is an excellent matchmaker.

The series is a modernized adaptation of Jane Austen's novel, Emma. One notable difference from the source material is Caroline Lee replaces Augusta Hawkins as Philip Elton's wife (as Emma is actually not connected to Pride and Prejudice in any way).

=== The Epic Adventures of Lydia Bennet ===
The Epic Adventures of Lydia Bennet is a book by Kate Rorick and Rachel Kiley, and audiobook with Mary Kate Wiles performing all the voices, telling Lydia's story from a few months after TLBD for about a year.

== Reception ==
The Guardian called The Lizzie Bennet Diaries "the best Austen adaptation around" at the 200th anniversary of Pride and Prejudice. In 2013 it was announced that The Lizzie Bennet Diaries would be awarded an award for Original Interactive Program at the Creative Arts Emmys, becoming the first digital series to win an Emmy Award.

In 2014, The Lizzie Bennet Diaries YouTube Channel was listed on New Media Rockstars Top 100 Channels, ranked at #40.

== Release ==
=== Video Release ===
A DVD set containing every episode of the series and its spinoffs was launched on Kickstarter on March 22, 2013; the initial pledge goal of $60,000 was met within six hours.

=== Syndication ===
In December 2016, Sinclair Broadcast Group announced a deal with Canvas Media Studios, a digital studio created by Su and former television executive David Tochterman, to syndicate digital shows. Included in the deal were Pemberley Digital properties The Lizzie Bennet Diaries, Emma Approved and Frankenstein M.D., re-edited into 30-minute episodes for television that did not include closing credits. The cast, writers and producers stated they were not notified of the deal before the episodes were launched.

== Awards and nominations ==
Awards and nominations for The Lizzie Bennet Diaries
Year	Award Show	Category	Result	Recipient(s)
2013	3rd Streamy Awards	Best Writing: Comedy	Won	Bernie Su
2013	3rd Streamy Awards	Best Female Performance: Comedy	Nominated	Ashley Clements
2013	3rd Streamy Awards	Best Female Performance: Comedy	Nominated	Julia Cho
2013	3rd Streamy Awards	Best Ensemble Cast	Nominated	
2013	3rd Streamy Awards	Best Comedy Series	Nominated	
2013	3rd Streamy Awards	Best Interactive Program	Won	
2013	3rd Streamy Awards	Audience Choice for Series of the Year	Nominated	
2013	65th Primetime Creative Arts Emmy Awards	Outstanding Creative Achievement In Interactive Media – Original Interactive Program	Won	Bernie Su, Jay Bushman, and Alexandra Edwards
2013	2nd International Academy of Web Television Awards	Best Interactive/Social Media Experience	Won	
2014	4th Streamy Awards	Best Drama Series	Won	
2014	4th Streamy Awards	Best Female Performance: Drama	Won	Ashley Clements
2014	4th Streamy Awards	Best Male Performance: Drama	Nominated	Daniel Vincent Gordh
