= Brent Bailey =

American actor

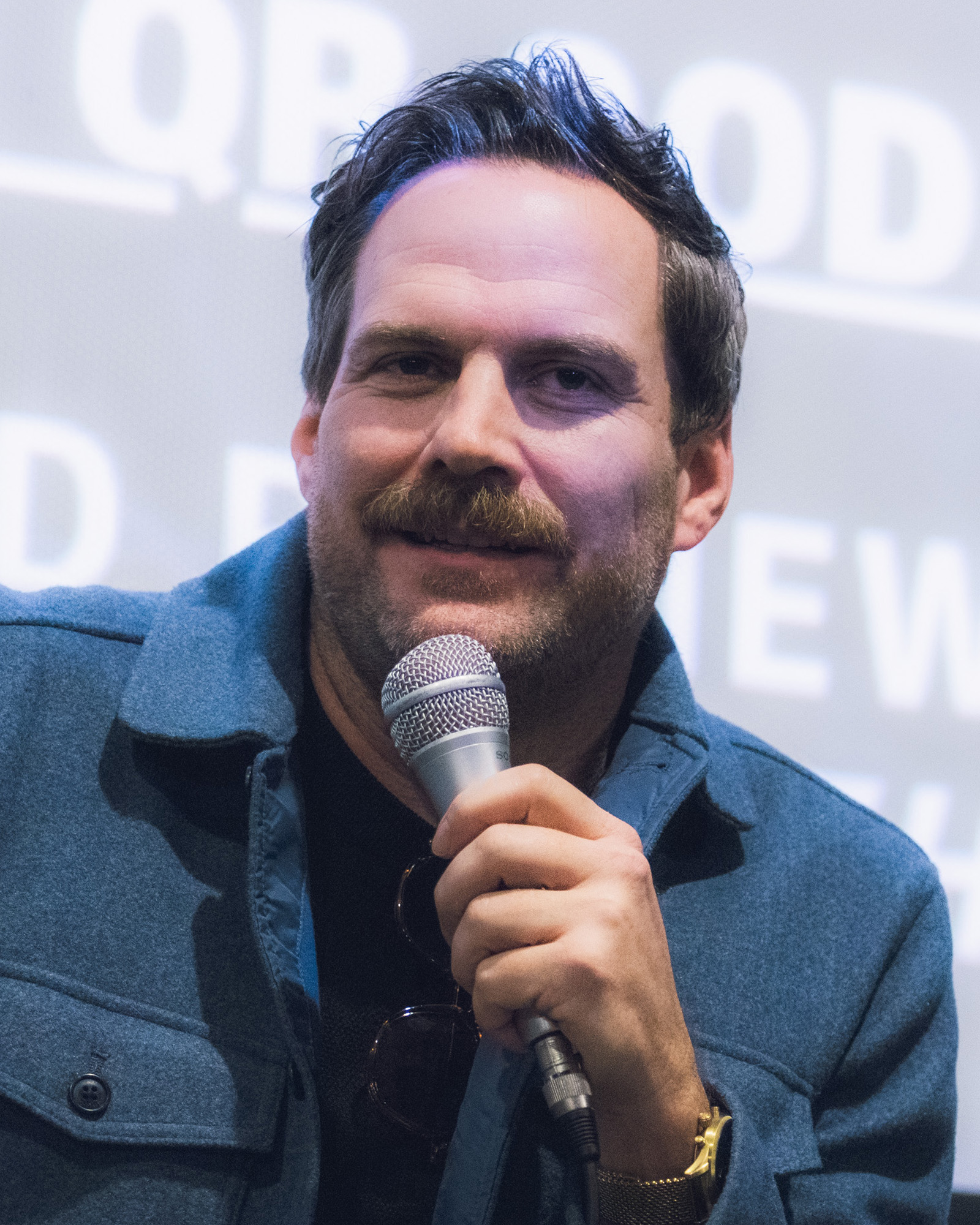
- Bailey in February 2026
- Born: July 4, 1983 (age 42); Tucson, Arizona, U.S.
- Occupations: Actor; director; producer; screenwriter
- Years active: 2006–present
- Known for: My Synthesized Life; Emma Approved

Brent Bailey is an American actor, director, producer, and screenwriter born in Tucson, Arizona. Bailey has appeared in television series such as Criminal Minds, Rizzoli & Isles, and Hart of Dixie. He also played Alex Knightley in the web series Emma Approved, which won a Primetime Emmy Award for Outstanding Original Interactive Program in 2015. He played John F. Kennedy's speechwriter Ted Sorensen in the film LBJ, directed by Rob Reiner.

== Filmography ==
- The Boys & Girls Guide to Getting Down (2006) as Kissing Guy
- Fear Is a Lot Like Love (2006 short) as Sunbather
- The Last Sentinel (2007) as Action Drone
- Waiting (2007 short) as College Guy #1
- Privileged (1 episode, 2008) as Antione
- Life (1 episode 2009) Andy Diller
- Suspension of Disbelief (2009 Short) as Sam
- Leaving Bliss (8 episodes, 2009) as Madison
- Life with Kat & McKay (1 episode, 2009) as Thor
- Relish (2009) as Mike
- It's Not About Coffee (2010) as Chris
- Ship in a Bottle (2010) as The Captain
- Continental Divide (2010 Short) as Will
- We're Not Together (2011) as Brandon
- Going Down in LA-LA Land (2011) as Dean
- Think Like a Man (2012) as Waiter
- Love-Stupid (2 episodes, 2012) as Derek
- Whitney (1 episode, 2013) as Matt
- Threshold (2013) as Alex
- My Synthesized Life (11 episodes, 2013) as Jimmy Bales
- The Republic of Two (2013) as Tim
- Crimson Winter (2013) as Fearghas
- Criminal Minds (1 episode, 2013) as Scotty Delfino
- Precipitation (2014) as Jordan
- Vid_687337 (2014) as David (and as director)
- Emma Approved (52 episodes, 2013–2014) as Alex Knightley
- Ru (2014) as Justin G.
- Classic Alice (2 episodes, 2014) as Anthony White, Hot TA
- Hart of Dixie (1 episode, 2014) as Zack
- Passport (2014) as Jimmy
- Bella and the Bulldogs (1 episode, 2015) as Bella's Dad
- Rizzoli & Isles (1 episode, 2015) as Tony
- Karma's a B*Tch - The Series (1 episode, 2015) as Chuck
- Soundproof (2015) as Andy
- Palo Alto (2 episodes, 2015) as Sam Cohen
- Her Dinner Party (2015) as Benjamin
- LBJ (2016) as Ted Sorensen
- Girlfriends of Christmas Past (2016) as Carter Bolton
- Agents of S.H.I.E.L.D. (2 episodes, 2018) as Agent Thomas
- Coop & Cami Ask the World (1 episode, 2019) as Eric Wrather
- A Cape Cod Christmas as Christian (December 4, 2021)
- Maggie as Spencer (July 6, 2022)
- The Holiday Dating Guide as Michael (December 17, 2022)
- The Idea of You (2024) as Todd
- Commercial for Target Corporation (2024) - Commercial Actor as Kris K.

== As writer/director/producer ==
- Vid_687337 (2014) as David (also as cinematographer. editor)
- Kids with Adult Problems (12 episodes, 2014)

== Recognition ==
=== Awards and nominations ===
- 2014, Indie Series Awards nomination as 'Best Lead Actor' for My Synthesized Life
- 2014, Streamy Awards nomination for 'Best Male Actor in a Comedy Web Series' for Emma Approved
- 2014, International Academy of Web Television award co-nomination for 'Best Ensemble Performance' for Emma Approved
