= 3rd Streamy Awards =

2013 awards ceremony recognizing online video

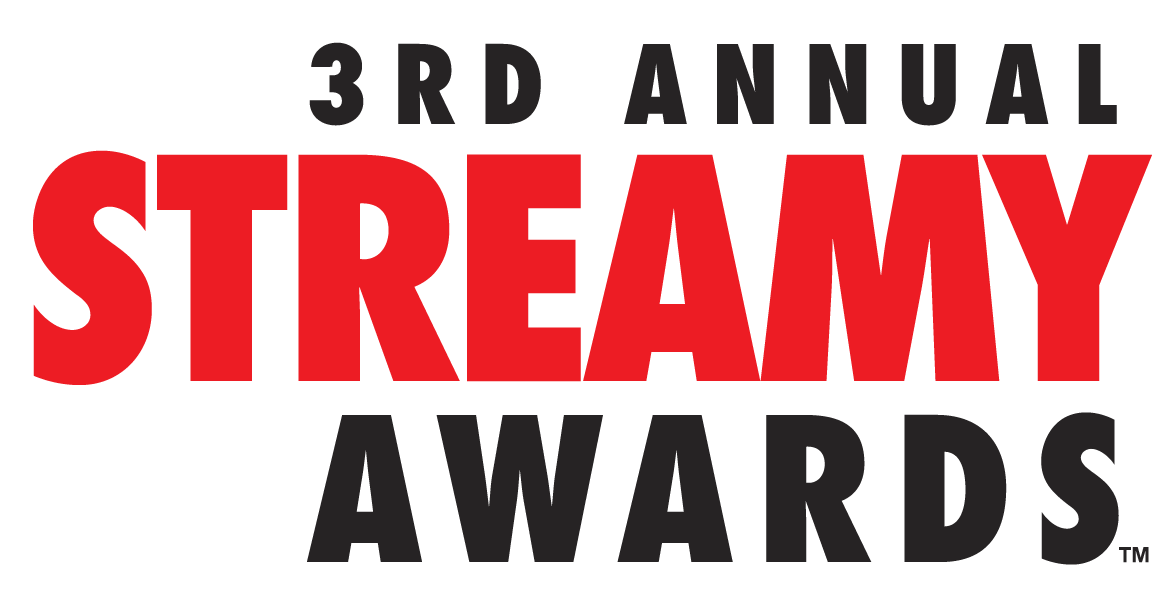
- Date: February 17, 2013
- Location: Hollywood Palladium; Los Angeles, California
- Presented by: Streamys Blue Ribbon Panel
- Hosted by: Chris Hardwick

Highlights
- Most awards: Halo 4: Forward Unto Dawn; Burning Love; Epic Rap Battles of History (4)
- Most nominations: MyMusic (10)
- Audience Choice: SourceFed (Series of the Year); Grace Helbig (Personality of the Year)

Television/radio coverage
- Network: YouTube
- Viewership: 700,000 live viewers 7 million total views
- Produced by: Dick Clark Productions; Tubefilter

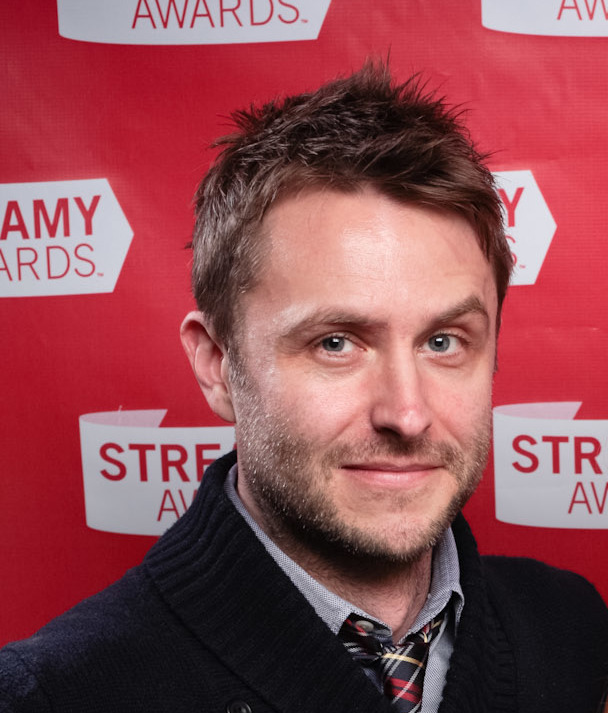
Chris Hardwick hosted the show

The 3rd Annual Streamy Awards was the third installment of the Streamy Awards honoring streaming television series. The awards were held on February 17, 2013, at the Hollywood Palladium in Los Angeles, California. It was hosted by the founder of Nerdist Industries, Chris Hardwick. Presented three years after the unsuccessful 2nd Streamy Awards which led to the International Academy of Web Television leaving the show, Tubefilter partnered with Dick Clark Productions in an attempt to bolster the credibility of the awards and with hopes of broadcasting the show on television. The show was viewed as more professional than previous years and was praised for its musical performances, but it also received a more mixed reception on its increased focus on mainstream shows and celebrities.

== Background ==
Although billed as the "3rd Annual", the poorly received 2nd Streamy Awards were actually presented three years prior in March 2010. They were criticized for technical problems, interruptions and controversy, leading to the two-year hiatus as the producers and organizers took time to regroup. In response to the controversy surrounding the 2nd Annual Streamys, the International Academy of Web Television, a partner in the 2010 event, chose to separate from the Streamys and create its own awards ceremony, the IAWTV Awards, for 2011. Tubefilter, the original co-creators of the Streamy Awards, partnered in 2011 with Dick Clark Productions, producers of the American Music Awards and other established entertainment industry awards shows, in an apparent effort to broaden the mainstream appeal and boost the credibility of the Streamy Awards. They also hoped to broadcast the show on television but were unable to for the 2013 Streamys.

== Performers ==
Tubefilter and Dick Clark Productions wanted collaborations between established stars and popular music YouTubers for the awards, arranging for YouTube stars to feature in the songs of the performers. The ceremony featured the musical performances of the following artists:

Performers at the 3rd Streamy Awards
Artist(s)	Song(s)
Boyce Avenue	
Shontelle (featuring Lisa Lavie, Savannah Outen, Kurt Hugo Schneider, and Sam Tsui)	"Impossible"
Soulja Boy	"Crank That" "Turn My Swag On"
Vanilla Ice (featuring Epic Rap Battles of History, DeStorm Power, Chester See, and Mike Tompkins)	"Ice Ice Baby"

== Winners and nominees ==
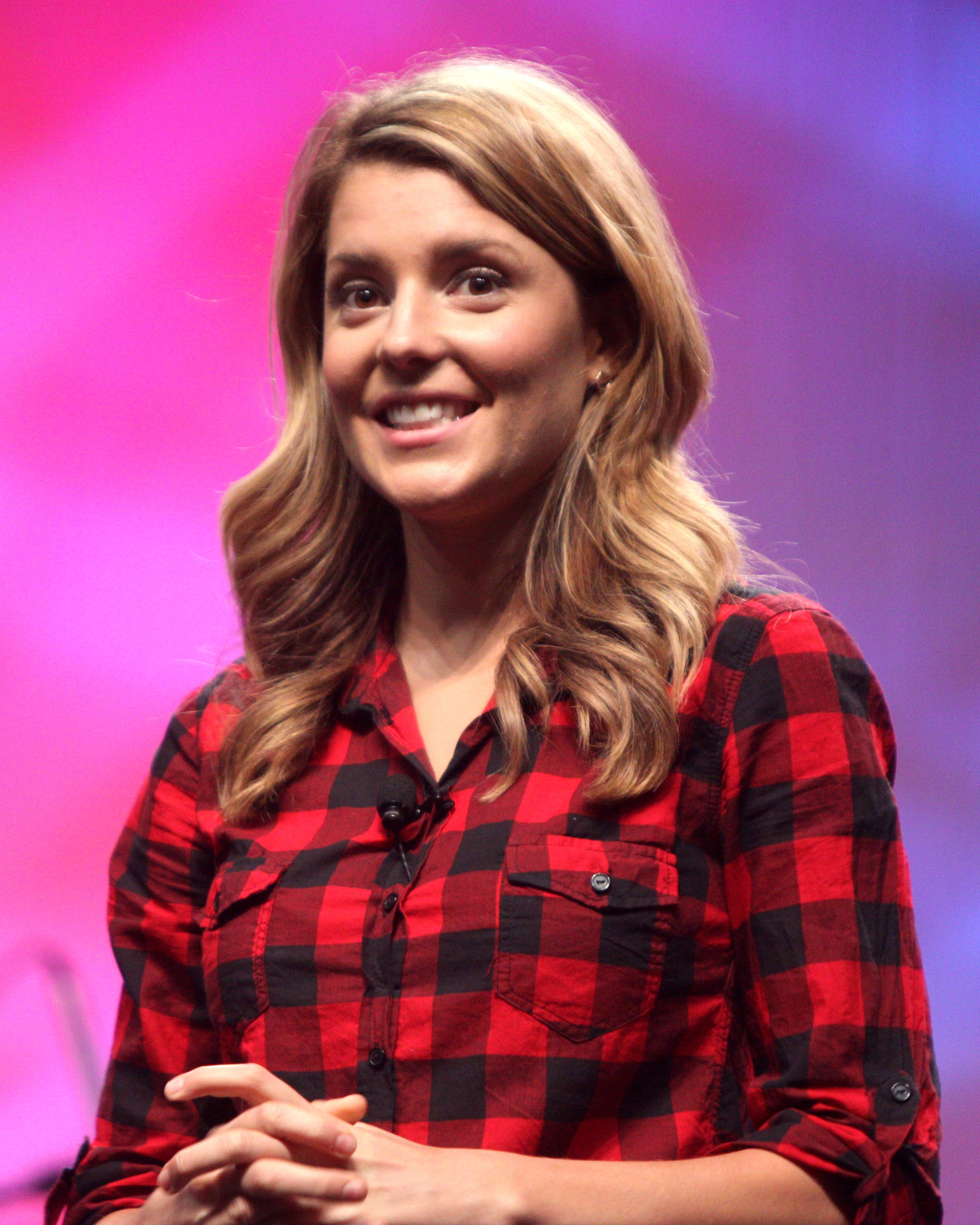
Grace Helbig, winner of Personality of the Year and Best First-Person Series

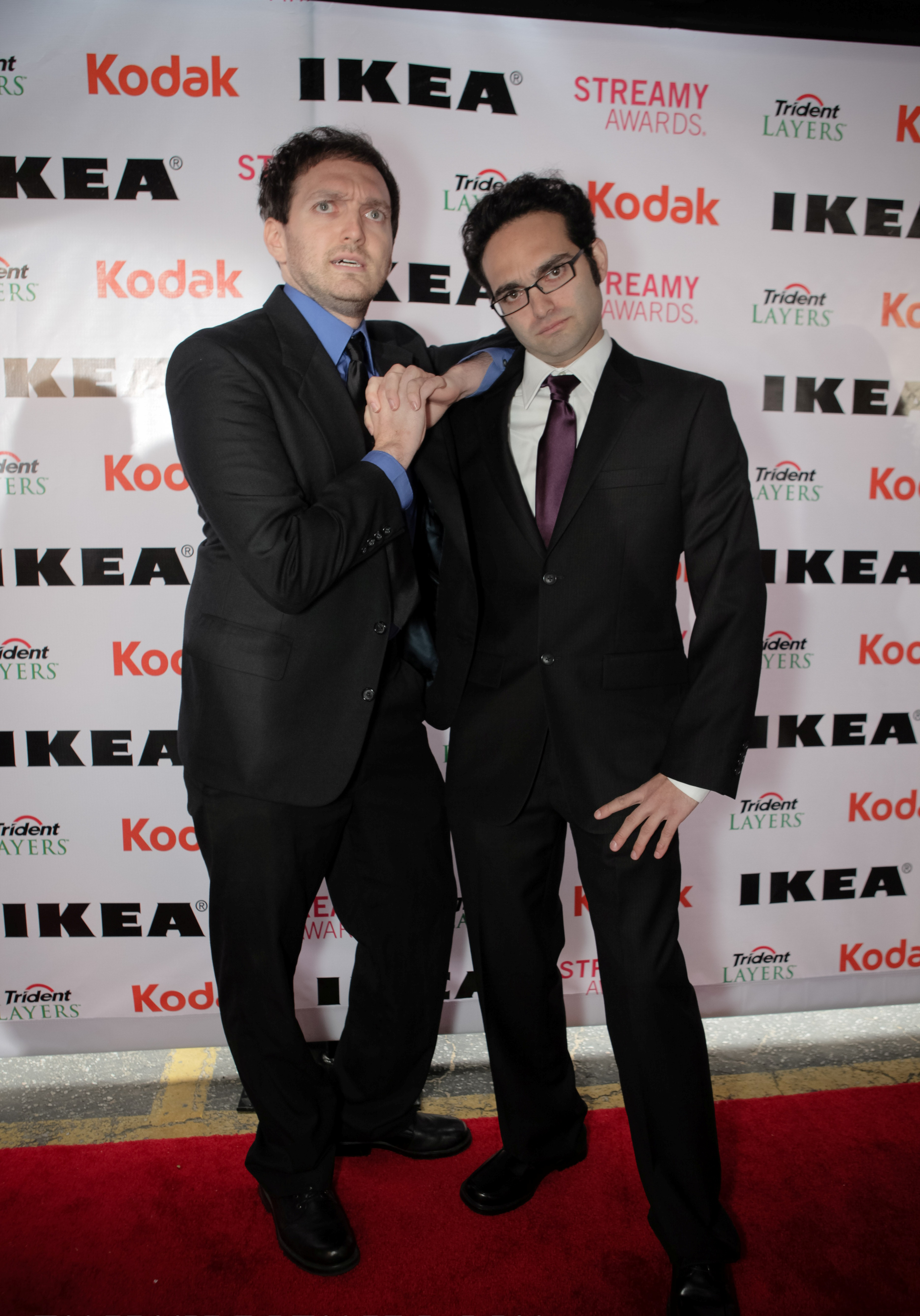
The Fine Brothers, winners of Best Non-Fiction or Reality Series for Kids React and 10 other awards for their show MyMusic

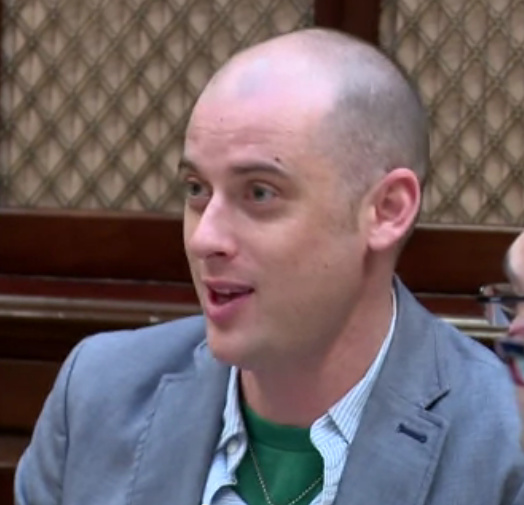
Peter Shukoff of Epic Rap Battles of History won 4 awards at the show

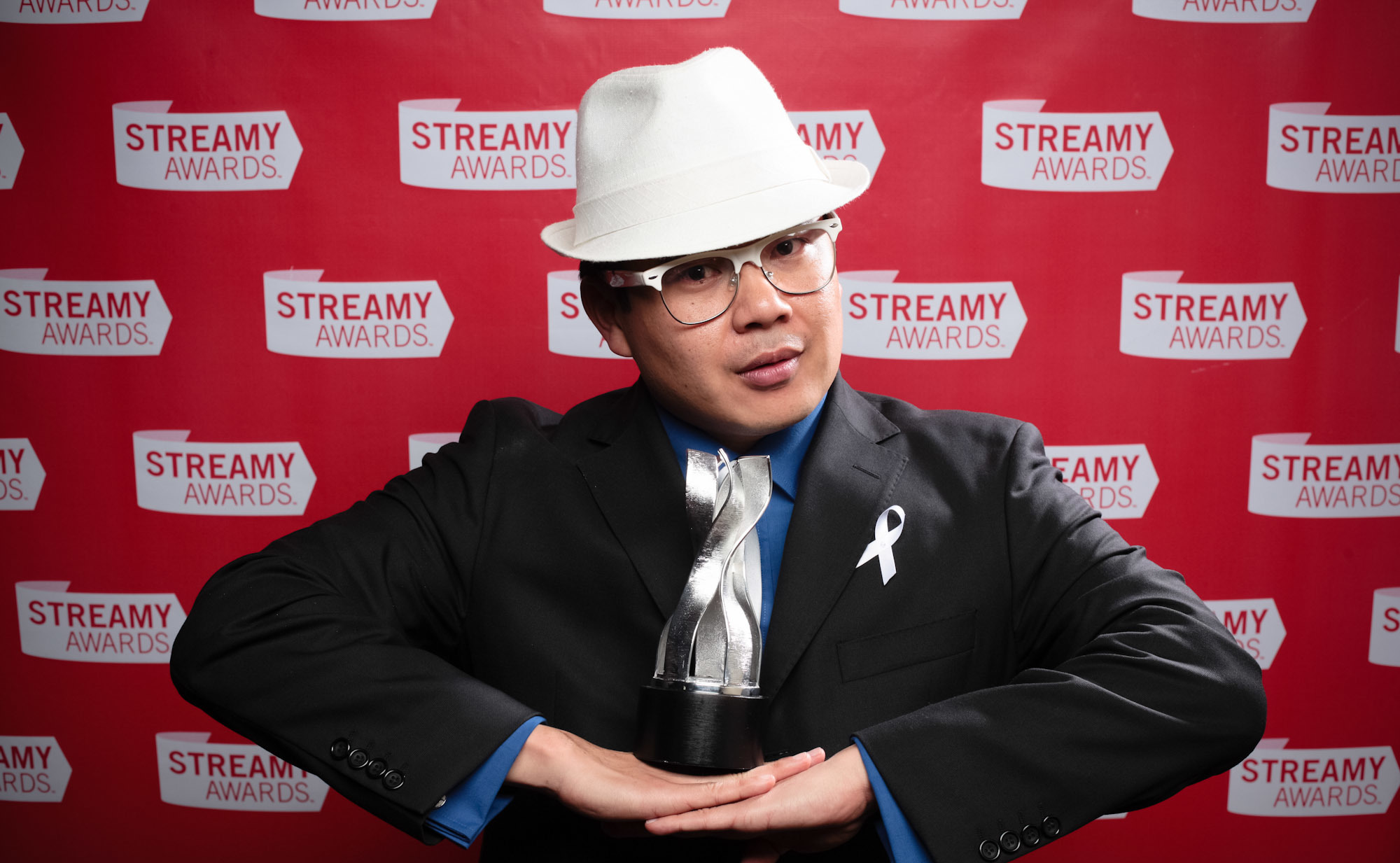
Bernie Su, winner of Best Writing - Comedy

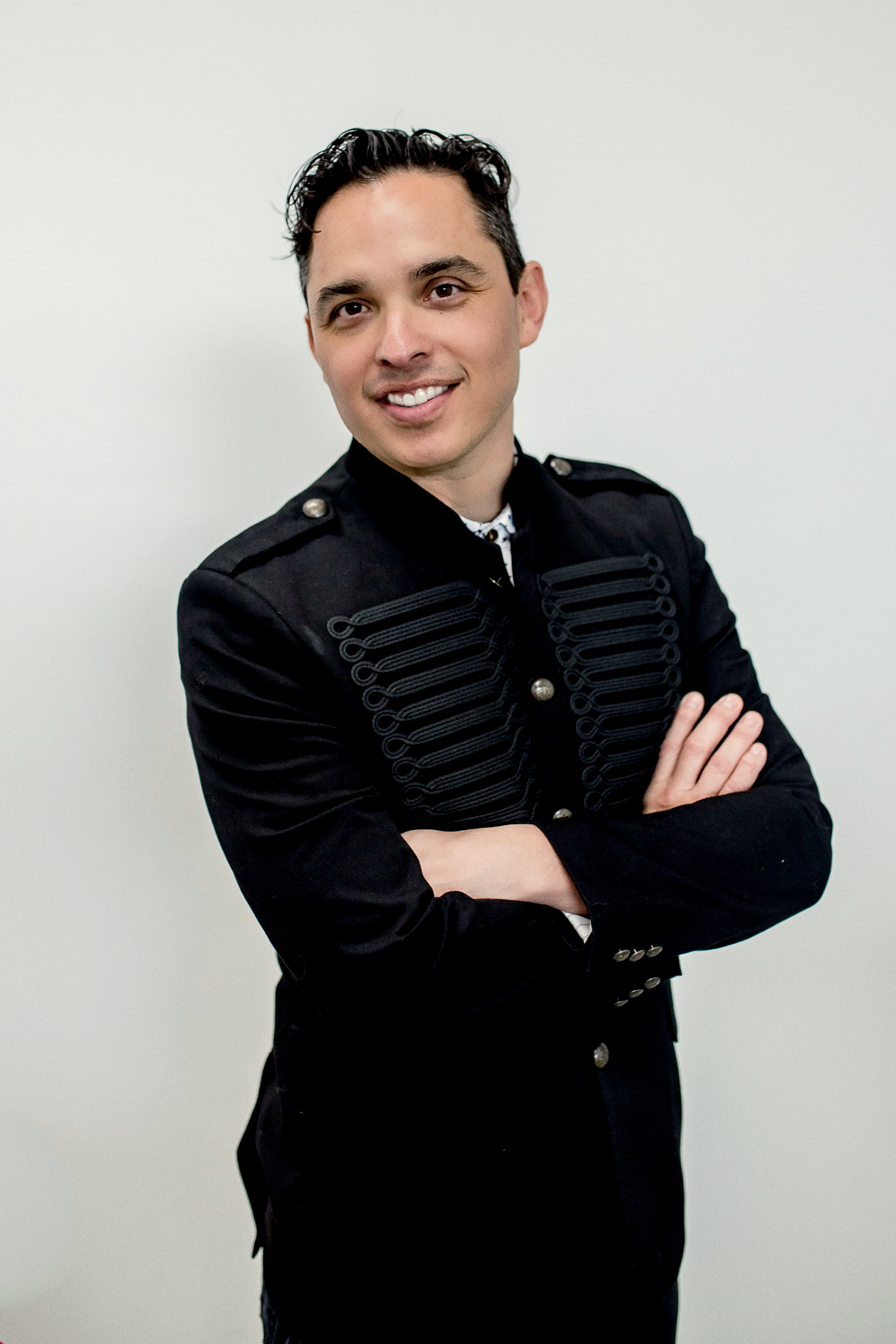
Tony Valenzuela, winner of Best Writing - Drama

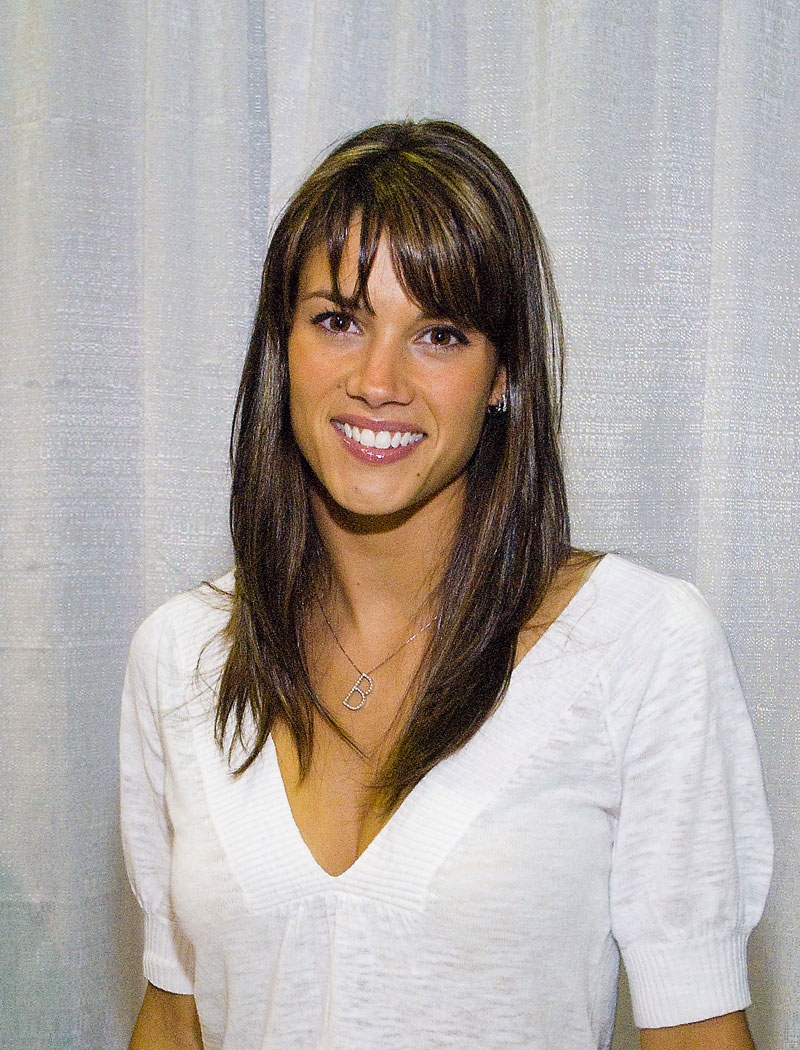
Missy Peregrym, winner of Best Female Performance - Drama

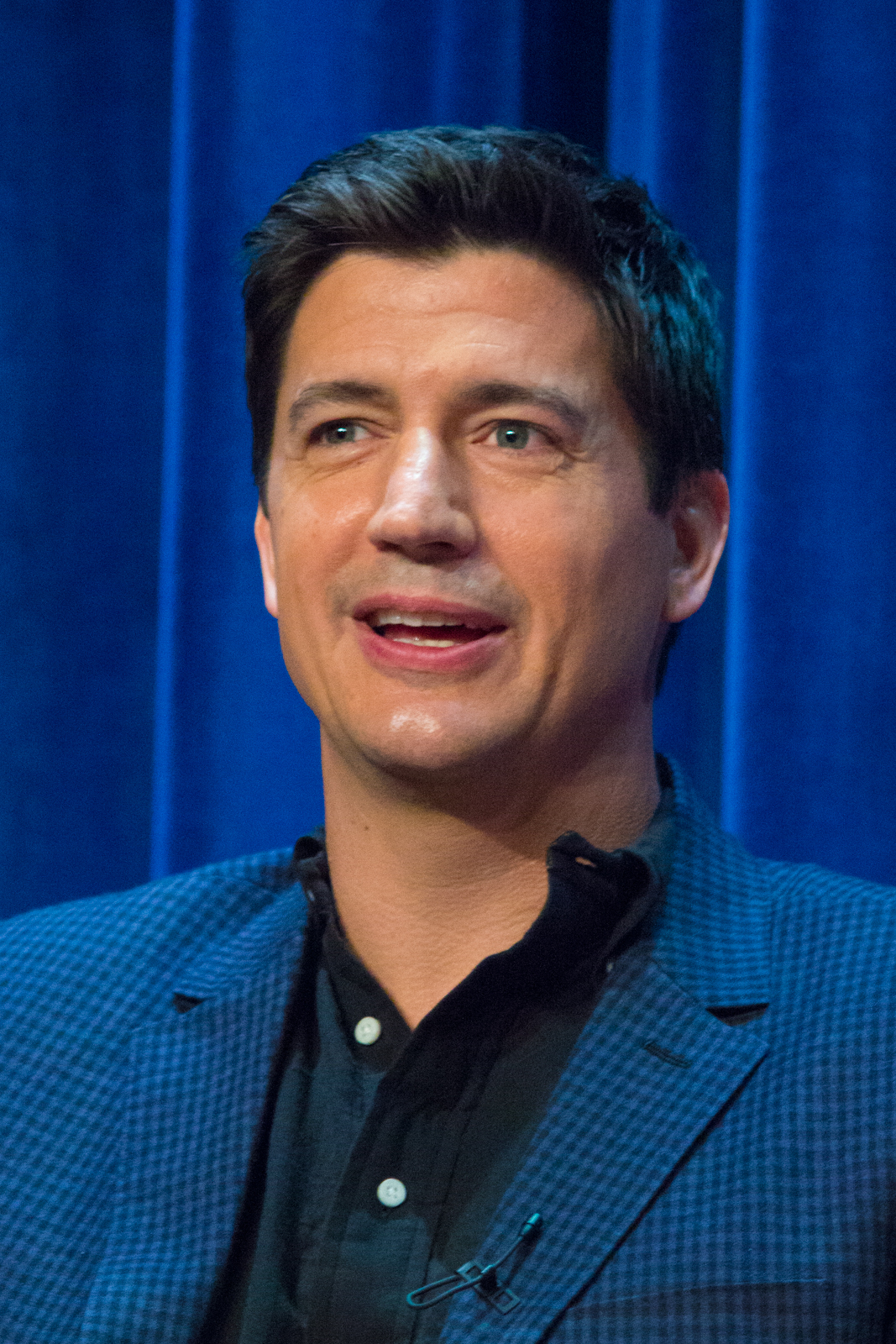
Ken Marino, winner of Best Male Performance - Comedy

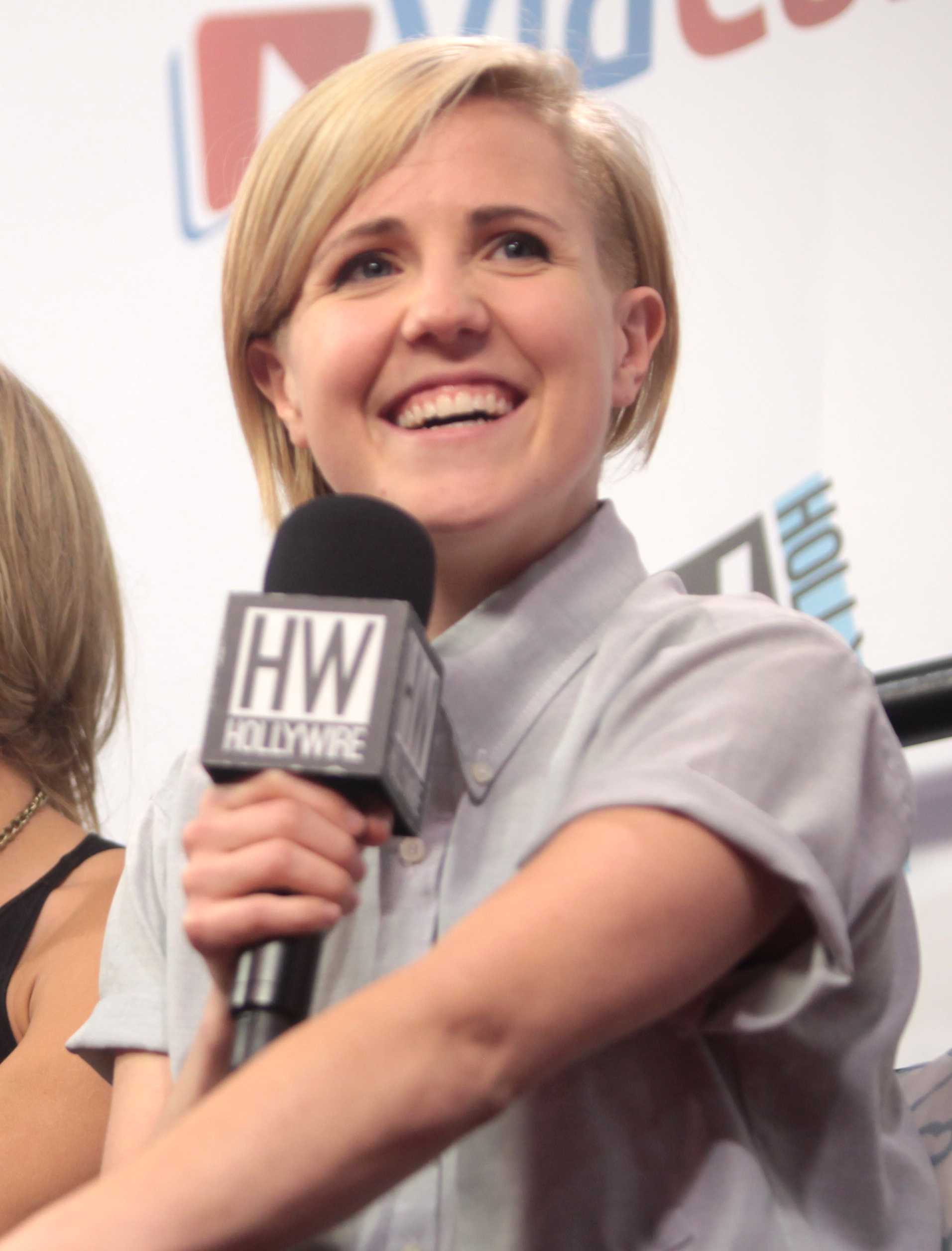
Hannah Hart, winner of Best Female Performance - Comedy

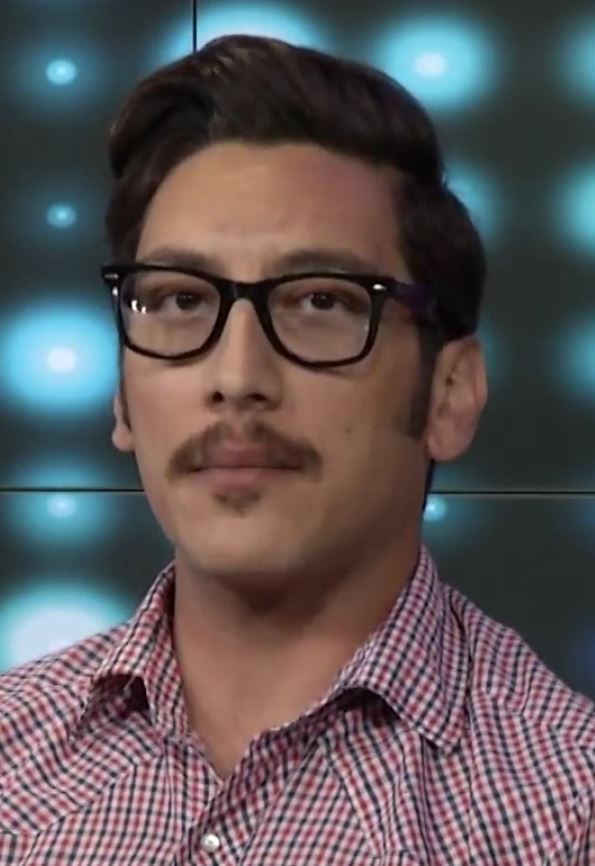
Kassem G, winner of Best Host

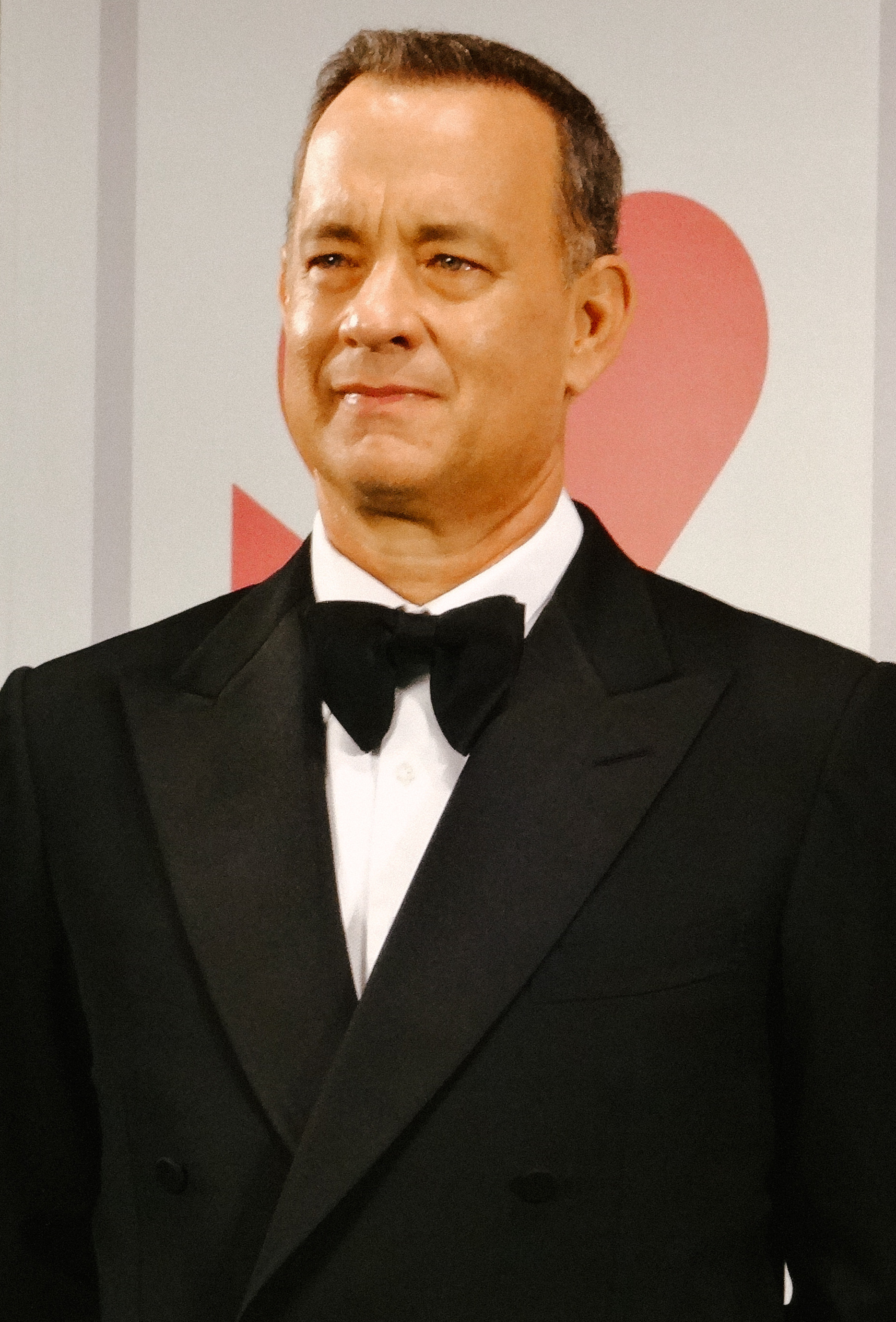
Tom Hanks' Electric City won Best Animated Series

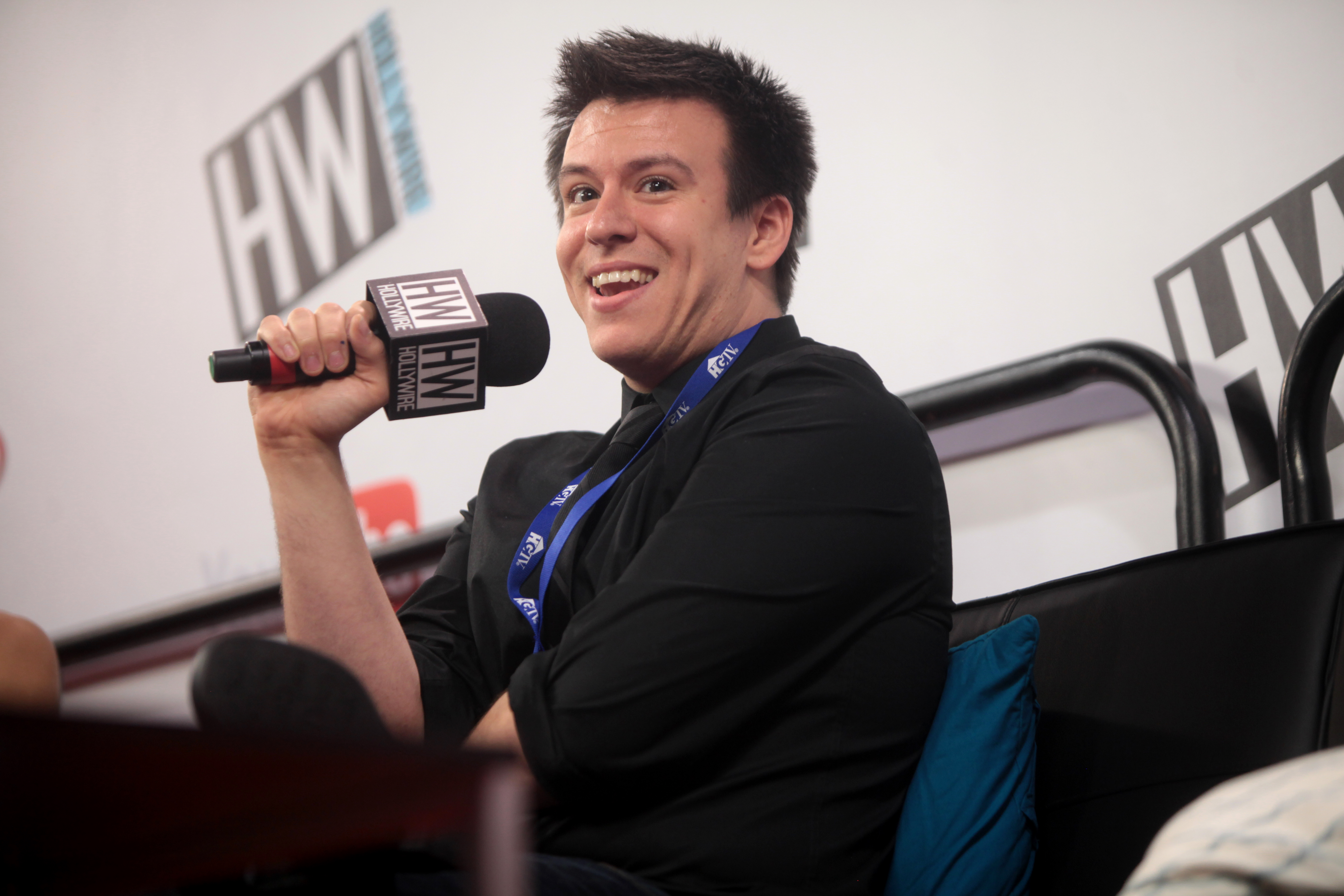
Philip DeFranco, winner of Best News and Culture Series

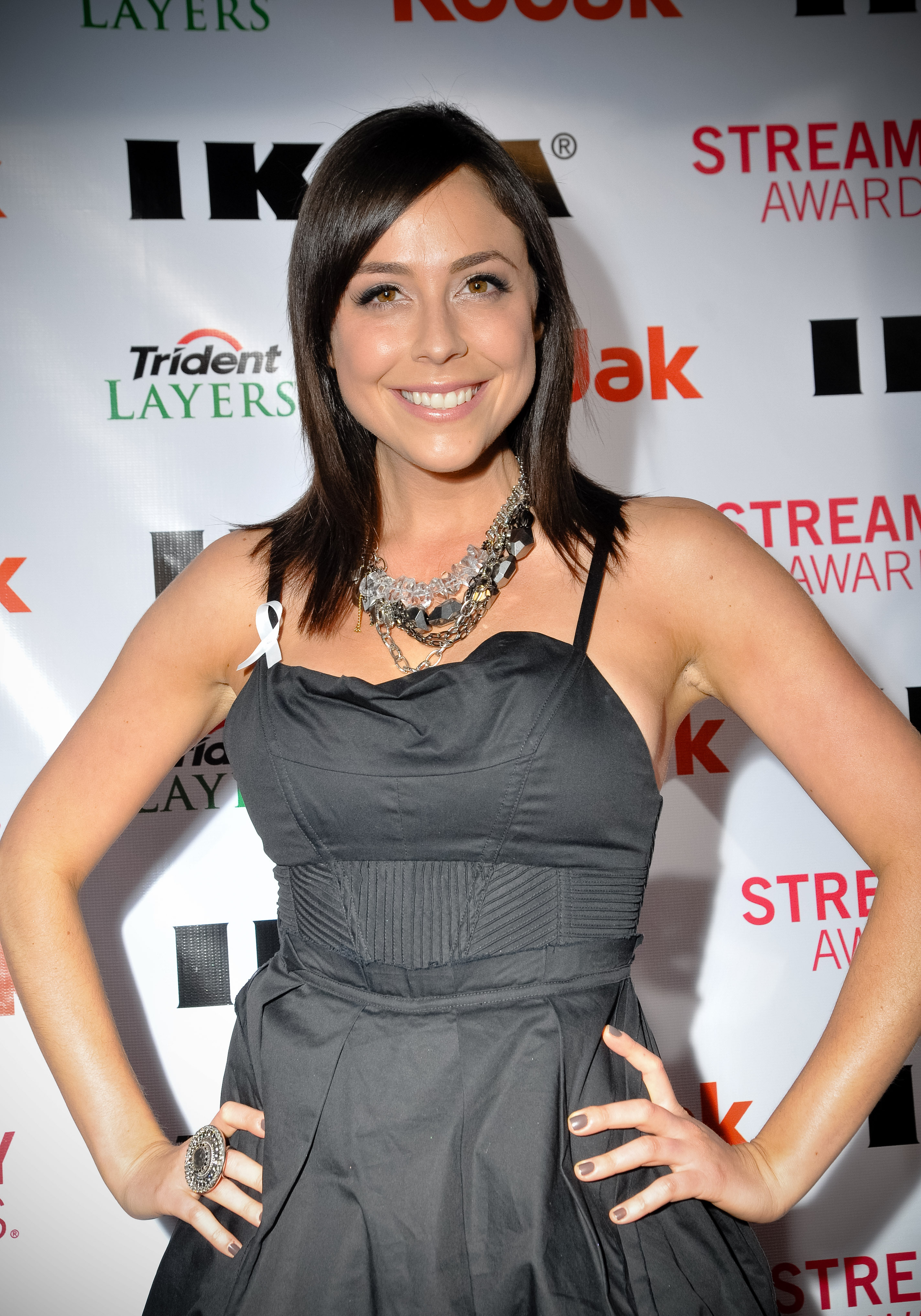
Shira Lazar, winner of Best Live Series

The nominees were announced on December 17, 2012, and the finalists for the Audience Choice Award categories were announced on February 5, 2013. 19 of the 35 award winners were announced prior to the presentation on February 14, 2013. The remaining categories were announced during the main ceremony at the Hollywood Palladium on February 17. Winners of the categories were selected by the Streamys Blue Ribbon Panel except for the Audience Choice awards which were put to a public vote.

Winners are listed first, in bold.

Audience Choice Award for Series of the Year	Audience Choice Award for Personality of the Year
**SourceFed**; MyMusic; The Lizzie Bennet Diaries; The Young Turks; Halo 4: Forward Unto Dawn; Visto Bueno; Husbands; Bro Team Pill; Red vs. Blue; Kids React	**Grace Helbig**; Ashley Clements; The Fine Brothers; Smosh; Mary Kate Wiles; Ryan Higa; Chester See; Bernie Su; Brad Bell; Megan and Liz
Best International Series	Best First-Person Series
**Travel Story**; Live in Chelsea; MxM – Mexico Around The World; Visto Bueno; PrisonPals	**DailyGrace**; The Flog; iJustine; The Philip DeFranco Show; Nigahiga
Best Comedy Series	Best Drama Series
**Burning Love**; The Lizzie Bennet Diaries; Smosh; MyMusic; PrisonPals	**Halo 4: Forward Unto Dawn**; Lauren; Anyone But Me; The Booth at the End; RUNAWAYS
Best Non-Fiction or Reality Series	Best News and Culture Series
**Kids React**; K-Town; Shaytards; Ultimate Surprises; California On	**The Philip DeFranco Show**; SourceFed; Larry King Now; The Young Turks; VICE News
Best Branded Entertainment Series	Best Derivative Series
**Leap Year**; Chasing with Steve Aoki; Cliffsnotes Films; Cybergeddon; Stories of Inclusive Innovation	**The Walking Dead "Cold Storage”**; 30 Rock Presents: The Donaghy Files; Parks and Recreation: April and Andy's Road Trip; Breakout Kings: Shrink Rapt; House of Lies: Fridays at Galweather
Best Action or Sci-Fi Series	Best Animated Series
**H+: The Digital Series**; DR0NE; Halo 4: Forward Unto Dawn; Bite Me; Clutch	**Tom Hanks’ Electric City**; Dinosaur Office; Dick Figures; Oishi High School Battle; Red vs. Blue
Best Music Series	Best DIY or How-To Series
**Epic Rap Battles of History**; AOL Sessions; Songify This; Songify the News; Decoded; VEVO GO Shows	**Masterclass**; Do It, Gurl; FPSRussia; Lauren Conrad's Crafty Creations; Common Man Cocktails
Best Live Series	Best Live Event
**What's Trending with Shira Lazar**; SourceFed; My Damn Channel LIVE; HuffPost Live; Secrets of the Red Carpet	**Red Bull Stratos**; Jay-Z Live From Barclays Center; SourceFed: #PDSLive 2012 Election Night Coverage; Bill Maher: CrazyStupidPolitics Live From Silicon Valley; Coca-Cola Red Carpet Live! @ The 2011 AMAs
Best Interactive Program	Best Host
**The Lizzie Bennet Diaries**; Chevy Sonic “Bungee Stunt”; Star Wars Uncut: The Empire Strikes Back; Dirty Work; Beckinfield	**KassemG, California On**; Toby Turner, Tobuscus; Mark Malkoff, Celebrity Sleepovers; Larry King, Larry King Now; Luke Reichle, Secrets of the Red Carpet
Best Writing: Comedy	Best Writing: Drama
**Bernie Su, The Lizzie Bennet Diaries**; Felicia Day, The Guild; Peter Shukoff and Lloyd Ahlquist, Epic Rap Battles of History; Spencer Grove, Annoying Orange; Benny and Rafi Fine, MyMusic	**Tony Valenzuela, Black Box TV**; Christopher Kubasik, The Booth at the End; Susan Miller and Tina Cesa Ward, Anyone But Me; Aaron and Todd Helbing, Halo 4: Forward Unto Dawn; Vlad Baranovsky and Yuri Baranovsky, Leap Year
Best Male Performance: Drama	Best Female Performance: Drama
**Xander Berkeley, The Booth at the End**; Ben Samuel, Battleground; Jackson Rathbone, Aim High; Olivier Martinez, Cybergeddon; Tom Green, Halo 4: Forward Unto Dawn	**Missy Peregrym, Cybergeddon**; Rachael Hip-Flores, Anyone But Me; Troian Bellisario, Lauren; Alison Haislip, Battleground; Anna Popplewell, Halo 4: Forward Unto Dawn
Best Male Performance: Comedy	Best Female Performance: Comedy
**Ken Marino, Burning Love**; Amir Blumenfeld, Jake and Amir; Jeff Lewis, The Jeff Lewis 5-Minute Comedy Hour; Brad Bell, Husbands; Ryan Welsh, Bite Me	**Hannah Hart, My Drunk Kitchen**; Kristen Bell, Burning Love; Alessandra Torresani, Husbands; Ashley Clements, The Lizzie Bennet Diaries; Julia Cho, The Lizzie Bennet Diaries
Best Ensemble Cast	Best Guest Appearance
**Burning Love**; Cybergeddon; Epic Meal Time; The Lizzie Bennet Diaries; Video Game High School	**Ken Jeong, Burning Love**; Blake Griffin, Book Club; Eliza Dushku, Leap Year; Felicia Day, MyMusic; Joss Whedon, Husbands
Best Online Musician	Best Original Song
**Peter Shukoff, Epic Rap Battles of History**; DeStorm; Mike Tompkins; Lindsey Stirling; Chester See	**Peter Shukoff, Lloyd Ahlquist: "Steve Jobs vs. Bill Gates", Epic Rap Battles of History**; Alex Goot: “Lightning”; Megan and Liz, Rob Hawkins, Martin Johnson: “Bad For Me”; Kurt Hugo Schneider: “Run to Me”, RUNAWAYS; Elizabeth Chan: “A Christmas Song”, Failure Cub
Best Direction	Best Production Design
**Stewart Hendler, H+: The Digital Series**; Mike Diva, Mike Diva Presents; Benny and Rafi Fine, MyMusic; Jon Avnet, Jan; Drew Daywalt, Black Box TV	**Kasra Farahani, Halo 4: Forward Unto Dawn**; Rachel Myers, Video Game High School; Andres Cubillan, H+: The Digital Series; Lindsey Stirling; Greg Aronowitz and Alynne Schripsema, MyMusic
Best Cinematography	Best Editing
**Brett Pawlak, Halo 4: Forward Unto Dawn**; Sean Stiegemeier, DR0NE; Nick Schrunk, Red Bull Moments; Brett Pawlak, H+: The Digital Series; Benjamin Kantor, Husbands	**Michael Louis Hill, Halo 4: Forward Unto Dawn**; Nathan Zellner, Matt Hullum, Miles Luna, Benjamin Martin, Cody Ducksworth, Red vs. Blue; Blake Calhoun, Continuum; Butcher Editorial, David Henegar and Ray Daniels, Daybreak; Benny Fine, Rafi Fine, and team, MyMusic
Best Visual Effects	Best Choreography
**Oliver Hotz and Matthew A. Rubin, DR0NE**; Clayton D'Mello and John Godfrey, Bite Me; David Ebner, 10,000 DAYS; William Hyler, MyMusic; Tim Kendall, Book Club	**Lindsey Stirling, Lindsey Stirling**; Keone Madrid, Mari Madrid, Harry Shum, Jr. and Galen Hooks, Remixed; Hisonni Johnson, Fight Night Legacy; Brian Friedman, Masterclass; Kathryn Burns, MyMusic
Best Use of Fashion & Design	
**Mary "MaryDoodles" Gutfleisch, Epic Rap Battles of History**; The League of S.T.E.A.M., Adventures of The League of S.T.E.A.M.; Elaine Montalvo, Remixed; Kristin Ingram, The Guild; Cici Andersen and Catherine Elhoffer, MyMusic	

=== Web series with multiple nominations and awards ===
Web series that received multiple nominations
Nominations	Web Series
10	MyMusic
9	Halo 4: Forward Unto Dawn
7	The Lizzie Bennet Diaries
5	Burning Love
5	Epic Rap Battles of History
5	Husbands
4	Cybergeddon
4	H+: The Digital Series
4	SourceFed
3	Anyone But Me
3	Bite Me
3	The Booth at the End
3	DR0NE
3	Leap Year
3	Red vs. Blue
2	Battleground
2	Black Box TV
2	Book Club
2	California On
2	Kids React
2	Larry King Now
2	Lauren
2	Masterclass
2	The Philip DeFranco Show
2	PrisonPals
2	Remixed
2	RUNAWAYS
2	Secrets of the Red Carpet
2	Smosh
2	Video Game High School
2	Visto Bueno
2	The Young Turks

Web series that received multiple awards
Awards	Web series
4	Burning Love
4	Epic Rap Battles of History
4	Halo 4: Forward Unto Dawn
2	H+: The Digital Series
2	The Lizzie Bennet Diaries

== Reception ==
Stephanie Carrie, writing for LA Weekly, felt that the award show was more professional than previous years and noted the diversity of figures in attendance, citing as an example the presenters of the first award, Larry King and Jenna Marbles. Internet personality Felicia Day was more critical of the more mainstream approach compared to previous years stating "My impression is it's almost like a red carpet for old media. Four years ago the show was about independent spirit, innovation, and people doing things to break the system. Now it's about Hollywood coming in." Likewise, Ed Carrasco of NewMediaRockstars felt that the event should have been more focused around small independent creators than large scale productions such as Halo 4: Forward Unto Dawn and Tom Hanks’ Electric City which won many of the show's awards. Overall, he opined "If these ceremonies are all about creators, let's make them about creators, not about what has the most cred or money thrown into it."

Carrie described the musical performance of Shontelle and featured artists Lisa Lavie, Savannah Outen, Kurt Hugo Schneider, and Sam Tsui as a highlight of the night and said that it "illustrated beautifully how the web allows content creators and consumer to interact in a way that's still rare in mainstream media." Carrasco viewed the performance by Vanilla Ice positively, and also felt that the speeches of some of the award winners seemed more genuine compared to more mainstream award shows.

== See also ==
- List of Streamy Award winners
