= List of programs broadcast by Roar =

The following is a list of programs broadcast on Roar, which focused on internet-based series from Jukin Media, but now on reality and comedy series supplied by outside companies currently.

== Current programming ==
=== Unscripted series ===
- America’s Funniest Home Videos (November 1, 2025–present) – Tom Bergeron-era episodes
- Hollywood Game Night (June 30, 2025–present)
- Punk'd (December 4, 2023–present) – MTV-era episodes
- Weakest Link (June 30, 2025–present) – Jane Lynch-era episodes
- Whose Line Is It Anyway? (December 4, 2023–present) – Aisha Tyler-era episodes
- World's Dumbest... (May 31, 2022–present) – half-hour long edits

=== Scripted series ===
- Key & Peele (December 4, 2023–present)
- Saturday Night Live (September 30, 2024–present) – hour-long edits of episodes from seasons 7-49 and "best of" specials

=== E/I programming ===
- America's Heartland
- Animal Rescue
- Dog Tales

== Former programming ==
=== Compilation programs from The QYOU ===
- QYOU EDGE (February 13, 2017–September 17, 2018) – a showcase of weird, wacky, and gritty web videos presented during TBD's overnight hours
- QYOU PRIME (February 13, 2017–September 17, 2018) – early evening presentations of trending online videos and undiscovered features
- QYOU UP (February 13, 2017–September 17, 2018) – morning presentations of inspiring and inspirational videos and music
- QYOU ZONE (February 13, 2017–September 17, 2018) – an early-afternoon showcase of "the wildest, funniest, hottest web videos on the planet"

=== Scripted series ===
- The Lizzie Bennet Diaries (February 13, 2017–March 24, 2018) – comedy series inspired by the Jane Austen novel Pride and Prejudice
- Emma Approved (February 14, 2017–March 25, 2018) – comedy series inspired by the Jane Austen novel Emma
- Frankenstein, MD (February 15–May 31 and October 10–December 8, 2017) – comedy/science series loosely inspired by the Mary Shelley novel Frankenstein.
- MyMusic (November 29, 2017– September 4, 2018) – a Fine Brothers-produced mockumentary series (packaged as both half-hour full-length and compilation episodes) centering on a group of co-workers in a transmedia music production company.
- Dust – an hour-long compilation series of science fiction-based short films from independent filmmakers
- CollegeHumor's Hardly Working – a compilation series of the satirical workplace-based shorts centered in the offices of the College Humor website
- CollegeHumor Presents – a compilation series of comedy sketches produced by CollegeHumor

=== Unscripted series ===
- Best of the Week (February 13, 2017–2024) – a showcase of the week's best viral videos compiled from the Jukin Media sites FailArmy, Jukin' Video, The Pet Collective and People are Awesome
- This Week in Fails – FailArmy's showcase of epic fails (e.g. stunt mishaps and general blunders) caught on videotape
- TBD Fitness – hour-long weekly program featuring health tips and exercise instruction compiled from various online fitness video channels
- Titansgrave (February 14–November 7, 2017 and March 27–August 26, 2018) – Wil Wheaton and guests highlight and play tabletop role-playing games
- TBD Food – hour-long weekly program featuring recipes and culinary-themed story segments compiled from various food-focused online video channels
- While You Were... – recaps of the week's top online news stories and viral video compilations from Jukin' Video; hosted by Rick Carrera and Ashley Chavez (originally Ricardo Marquez and Ellyse O'Halloran)
- 10 Up – series from ZoominGames featuring information and "top ten lists" covering online gaming and eSports; hosted alternatingly by either TamTu Bui, Callum Stamp or Denise Doornebosch
- Big Red Lazor – a hybrid talk show and video game competition produced by ZoominGames; hosted by TamTu Bui, Callum Stamp and Denise Doornebosch
- Spellslingers (February 17–November 5, 2017 and August 28, 2018–April 26, 2019) – host Sean Plott and celebrity guests battle in rounds of Magic: The Gathering
- TableTop (February 17, 2017–April 26, 2019) – Wil Wheaton and guests highlight and play various tabletop games
- Caters TV Presents (July 5, 2017–May 27, 2019) – half-hour program produced by Caters News Agency, featuring trending videos and short-form news clips
- Pranks Network After Dark – half-hour program featuring compilations of practical jokes from various YouTube pranksters.
- Seeker Now (November 6, 2017–August 25, 2018) – a half-hour science and technology news program featuring content sourced from the Group Nine Media web channel.
- FBE: React – half-hour compilation program of the Fine Brothers-produced video series featuring reacting to viral videos, trends, film trailers, or music videos.
- FBE: React Gaming – half-hour compilation program of the Fine Brothers-produced video series featuring reacting to videos game.
- The Extreme World of Devin Super Tramp – half-hour compilation program featuring adventure and extreme sport videos shot by videographer Devin Graham.
- FBE: Try Again – half-hour compilation program of the Fine Brothers-produced video series featuring challenges undertaken by different groups of people.
- What's Trending on TBD – a compilation series recapping the week's top pop culture and trending news stories from What's Trending; hosted by Shira Lazar along with other What's Trending correspondents
- Escape! (March 30, 2018–January 25, 2019) – half-hour escape room competition program hosted by actress/comedienne Janet Varney, in which teams of four celebrities work together to solve complex puzzles and riddles
- The Look: All Stars (June 24, 2018–August 26, 2018) – an hour-long beauty makeover competition hosted by Tori Spelling and produced by Dreamventure Productions, in which two teams of beauty and fashion experts conduct "real-world and aspirational transformations".
- The Laboratory with CRH – half-hour compilation program of videos from the YouTube channel of Taras Kulakov (better known as CrazyRussianHacker), including science experiments, survival hacks and product reviews.
- Corridor Digital: Maxed Out! – half-hour compilation program featuring special-effects driven sci-fi, action, and comedy videos produced by visual effects firm Corridor Digital.
- Nerdist Presents: Set List (August 29, 2018–January 27, 2019) – a half-hour series in which comedians are challenged to perform improvised stand-up routines, described as "stand-up without a net," based upon topics provided to them on the spot.
- FailArmy Presents: The Flop – FailArmy's half-hour series featuring viewer comments read by the show's hosts as well as fails and amazing caught-on-tape moments
- Cheddar Explains (February 4–May 4, 2019) – half-hour program produced by Cheddar, which takes a look at questions about technology and the economy.
- The Baeble Block Party (March 28–May 2, 2019) – a condensed, one-hour version of the Baeble Music series featuring behind-the-scenes looks at Baeble-produced concerts, music sessions and artist interviews.
- FailFactory (May 17, 2019–2024) – FailArmy half-hour series featuring themed viral fail videos
- Outside TV Shorts – a half-hour compilation series featuring outdoor sports clips (ranging from two to six minutes in length) available on Outside TV's Outside TV Shorts app
- FBE: People vs. Food – half-hour compilation program of the Fine Brothers-produced React Channel series featuring React cast members and FBE staffers trying unusual and foreign foods or engaging in eating challenges.
- The Link - a compilation of viral videos, starting at one and linking to another, hosted by Lorena Abreu.
- Animals Unscripted
- FailArmy's Best Fails of the Month
- Fear Factor
- Wipeout
- The Laugh List (December 4, 2023–2025)
