= Aim High =

2006 FIRST Robotics Competition game

- Year: 2006

Season Information
- Number of teams: 1133
- Number of regionals: 33
- Championship location: Georgia Dome, Atlanta, Georgia

FIRST Championship Awards
- Chairman's Award winner: Team 111 – "Wildstang"
- Woodie Flowers Award winner: Rob Mainieri
- Founder's Award winner: United Technologies Corporation
- Champions: Team 296 – "Northern Knights"; Team 217 – "ThunderChickens"; Team 522 – "Robo Wizards"

Aim High was the 2006 game for the FIRST Robotics Competition. The competition involved teams competing to gain points by delivering balls into goals and positioning their robots in certain positions on the playing field. The teams took it in turn to provide defense and attack.

== Game description ==
Aim High was played by two alliances, red and blue, each consisting of three robots. During a 10-second autonomous mode robots were programmed to score into any of the three goals: one raised center goal marked by a green vision target and two corner goals at floor level. At the end of the autonomous period the alliance with the most points would gain a 10-point bonus and would be placed on defense for round two. Rounds two, three and four were each 40 seconds long and were human-controlled rounds. Between rounds two and three the alliances switch from offense to defense or vice versa. At the start of round 4 any alliance could score into the corresponding goals. At the end of the match any alliance could receive bonus points by placing its three robots on a platform below the center goal. The alliance with the most points won with scoring as follows: 3 points for any ball scored in the center goal, 1 point for any ball scored in the corner goals, 10 bonus points for scoring the highest in the autonomous round and 25 points for placing all 3 robots on the platform at the end (10 points for 2 robots and 5 points for 1 robot).

=== Field layout ===
The Aim High field had 6 goals and 2 platforms. Unlike previous years an alliance's goals were on the far side of the field. The field was flat and measures 54 feet (16 m) long by 26 feet (7.9 m) wide.

=== Alliance station ===
The alliance station wall was 26 ft (8 m) long and stretched the width of the field. The middle 18 ft (5 m) of the alliance station wall was made of "diamond plate" aluminum from the floor to 3 ft (1 m) high with clear acrylic filling the rest of the 3.5 ft (1.1 m). The outer edges of the wall consisted of transparent polycarbonate. Above each alliance station there was a circular goal (the center goal), with a green light above it. The green light was used so that the CMUcam can lock onto it. On the bottom left and right of each alliance station there were two rectangular holes, the corner goals, through which balls can be maneuvered to receive points. In front of each alliance station there was a raised platform.

== Tournament structure ==
The tournament structure was the same as in previous years. In the regional competitions teams were given access to their robots on the Thursday of the competition weekend. It was a practice day giving each team a number of practice rounds on the regulation playing field. Friday and the morning of Saturday was dedicated to a series of qualification rounds. Each team competed in around seven to ten matches. The number of wins by a team in those matches determined the team's ranking.

Before a lunch break on Saturday the top eight teams from the qualification rounds were asked, in order from the top-seeded team to the eighth seed, to select an alliance of three robots. In contrast to previous years this order reversed for the second selection round and the eighth seed picks first and then backwards to the first seed. This was instituted to make the finals more competitive and balanced compared to previous years.

After the lunch break the finals took place. This was a standard-elimination tournament bracket starting with alliance 1 facing alliance 8, alliance 2 facing alliance 7, and so on. At the end of the finals the last remaining alliance was declared the winner and all three teams were given the right to attend the national competition.

== Kit of Parts ==
There were several changes in the kit of parts in 2006:

- The inclusion of the National Instruments LabVIEW program
- CMUcam II, including a pan/tilt assembly with servos, designed to follow an illuminated target
- A new robot controller based on the PIC18F8722 instead of the PIC18F8520
- A new EasyC programming tool
- New wider CIM motors with drive belts
- New smaller Window motors
- A new smaller and lighter backup battery charger
- An Infrared transmitter and receiver (for broken beam detection)
- A Digital camera and Picasa software donated by Google

== Rules ==
- Intentionally damaging another robot or the playing field is not allowed.
- No balls may exit the robot at a velocity greater than 12 m/s (39 ft/s).
- The shooter mechanism must remain within the dimensions of 28 in (711 mm) by 38 in (965 mm) by 60 in (1,524 mm) tall. Intentionally "flopping" to drive or score with the 60 in (1,524 mm) dimension on the ground is prohibited.
- No part of the robot may extend more than 60 in (1,524 mm) above the floor. If a robot is more than 60 in (1,524 mm) high and it shoots a ball, or blocks a ball from being shot, a 5-point penalty per ball will be applied.
- Power supplies are limited to compressed air, a 12-volt motorcycle battery, and a 7.2-volt RC battery

== Robots ==
There were many viable tactics in Aim High. There were ball dumpers, floor shooters, ramp shooters and defensive robots.

=== Ball dumpers ===
The primary aim of a ball dumper was to collect balls that were either loaded into it via the human players or that it collected off the floor. The ball dumper then moved to one of the lower goals and dumped all the balls into the lower goal for a significant number of 1-point goals. Ball dumpers could be made to be very reliable in autonomous, as they do not depend on aiming and were difficult to block with an opposing ramming robot from across the field. Ball dumping teams had to deal with defensive robots attempting to block their transit to and from the human loading zone, as well as teams that may simply block the lower goals to prevent them from dumping.

=== Floor shooters ===
Team 573's floor shooter

Floor shooters were the more common of the two shooter varieties. A majority fired mainly from a few feet in front of the ramp. Some (referred to as ranged shooters, perimeter shooters or distant shooters) could fire from half the court distance or more. Floor shooters, especially those that fired from near the ramp, had to contend with great amount of defense to block their shots and dislocate them from shooting positions. A wide variety of shooting mechanisms could be found on floor shooters including two horizontally mounted spinning discs, two vertically mounted (for the allowance of backspin), and singular mount spinning discs with a curved output track. Many used the CMUCam to some extent while shooting and a few even had automated turrets that automatically locked onto the target.

=== Ramp shooters ===
Ramp shooters were robots that used the height of the ramp to greatly reduce the distance that they had to propel the ball. Ramp shooters drive up to their wall and fire balls through a high-mounted shooting mechanism that is statically aimed directly at the goal. Ramp shooters had a disadvantage from floor shooters as they had to traverse the ramp, risking tipping, and could only shoot from one location directly in front of the goal. Defense against a ramp shooter was simply to sit in position on top of the ramp, or prevent them from getting up the ramp.

=== Defense ===
Since scoring in the high goal in "Aim High" was difficult and as there were specific offense and defense periods defense plays a very large role. An effective defense prevented their opponents from gathering balls, dumping balls and shooting balls. A defensive robot was involved in a great deal of ramming and pushing and had to have a very strong and durable drivetrain. A low centre of mass was a key asset so that the robot could play up and down the ramp without worry of tipping. In order to prevent robots from scoring a robot playing defense will attempt to attack the corners of the shooting robot, which would cause it to spin. A few defensive bots had nets, walls or other defensive mechanisms to block shots.

== Competition season ==
=== Events ===
The following regional events were held in 2006:

- Arizona Regional - Phoenix, AZ
- BAE Systems Granite State Regional - Manchester, NH
- Boilermaker Regional - West Lafayette, IN
- Boston Regional - Boston, MA
- Buckeye Regional - Cleveland, OH
- Chesapeake Regional - Annapolis, MD
- Colorado Regional - Denver, CO
- Davis Sacramento Regional - Davis, CA
- Detroit Regional - Detroit, MI
- Finger Lakes Regional - Rochester, NY
- Florida Regional - Orlando, FL
- GM/Technion Israel Regional - Tel Aviv, Israel
- Great Lakes Regional - Ypsilanti, MI
- Greater Toronto Regional - Mississauga, ON, Canada (2 fields)
- Las Vegas Regional - Las Vegas, NV
- Lone Star Regional - Houston, TX
- Midwest Regional - Chicago, IL
- NASA/VCU Regional - Richmond, VA
- New Jersey Regional - Trenton, NJ
- New York City Regional - New York City, NY
- Pacific Northwest Regional - Portland, OR
- Palmetto Regional - Columbia, SC
- Peachtree Regional - Duluth, GA
- Philadelphia Regional - Philadelphia, PA
- Pittsburgh Regional - Pittsburgh, PA
- St. Louis Regional - St. Charles, MO
- SBPLI Long Island Regional - Hempstead, NY
- Silicon Valley Regional - San Jose, CA
- Southern California Regional - Los Angeles, CA
- UTC New England Regional - Hartford, CT
- Waterloo Regional - Waterloo, ON, Canada
- West Michigan Regional - Allendale, MI
- Wisconsin Regional - Milwaukee, WI

The championship was held in the Georgia Dome, Atlanta.
