= Ryan Morrison =

American attorney and esports agent

- Born: Huntington Station, New York, United States
- Education: New York Law School
- Occupations: Esports agent; attorney
- Years active: 2015–present
- Known for: Being the Video Game Attorney
- Parents: Patrick Morrison; Laurie

Ryan Morrison, also known as the Video Game Attorney, is an American attorney and esports agent focusing on law related to video games and internet culture. He is the CEO and founder of Evolved Talent Agency and a founding partner of MGL LLP.

== Early life and career ==
Morrison was born in Huntington Station, New York, to Laurie and Patrick Morrison. Morrison worked full-time during high school, saving up money to attend college. Once there, his father committed identity theft against both Morrison and his grandmother, resulting in Morrison having to drop out of college.

Morrison worked at Bomber’s Burrito Bar in Albany, New York, while saving up enough money to reenroll back in school, once there graduating and eventually applying to and being accepted to New York Law School.

In law school, Morrison worked with Professors Michelle Zierler and Jethro Leiberman to bring attention to the injustice surrounding the West Memphis Three, by writing various articles and organizing the first live interview with Damien Echols once he was released from death row.

Additionally, Morrison worked with Large Animal Games as a legal intern, gaining experience he would later use in his digital entertainment law career.

== Career and views ==
Once an attorney, Morrison opened his own law firm and committing hundreds of pro bono hours of legal work.

Morrison's habit of participating in Reddit has been analyzed as a business marketing strategy. He advocates for independent developers of popular Internet media and video games.

Morrison became a center of attention in the React World controversy when the Reddit community and others began to call on him for his legal insights on copyright and his engagement in copyright activism. His participation in the issue was an important factor in the resolution of the issue in favor of the activists.

In June 2023, he acted as the agent for Félix Lengyel, known as XQc, in a contract with the streaming platform Kick. The agreement was reported to be worth approximately $70 million over two years, with incentives that could raise the total to $100 million.

Morrison has been described by Kotaku as a "hero" to video game developers, "particularly if they’re fighting against the bullies of the games industry and feel overwhelmed". Morrison has also helped esports players and their teams revamp deals with major gaming organizations. Morrison has been involved in advocating for player rights within the esports industry, including offering public commentary on contract disputes, such as the case between Turner "Tfue" Tenney and FaZe Clan. He has also participated in discussions related to mental health in competitive gaming, appearing on industry panels addressing the subject. Working with agent Chris Lloyd, Morrison has represented esports players, with their efforts contributing to broader industry discussions about standardizing contract terms across various leagues.
