= FPSRussia =

American YouTuber and podcaster (born 1986)

Kyle Myers
- Born: Kyle Lamar Myers; May 9, 1986 (age 40); Lavonia, Georgia, U.S.

YouTube information
- Channel: FPSRussia
- Years active: 2010–2016
- Genre: Firearms/weaponry
- Subscribers: 6.83 million
- Views: 972.1 million
- Last updated: April 8, 2026

Kyle Lamar Myers (born May 9, 1986) is an American podcaster and former YouTuber known under the stage name FPSRussia and FPSKyle. His YouTube channel features Myers portraying the fictional role of Dimitri Potapov, a heavily accented "professional Russian" from Moscow. His videos center around the usage of large amounts of firearms and explosives.

Myers launched the FPSRussia channel in April 2010 and found success with the channel, as it surpassed one million subscribers in June 2011. In January 2013, the channel went on hiatus after a member of its production team was found shot dead, prompting an investigation by the Georgia Bureau of Investigation (GBI). Myers' residence was the subject of further GBI and Bureau of Alcohol, Tobacco, Firearms and Explosives (ATF) investigations later in 2013, and again in 2017.

Myers ceased producing new FPSRussia videos in 2016, though he continues to maintain an online presence as the co-host of Painkiller Already (PKA), a podcast he co-founded in 2010. As of April 2025, the FPSRussia channel has retained 6.9 million subscribers and amassed over 970 million views.

== YouTube channel history ==
=== Background and video format ===
Before Myers started FPSRussia, he ran a YouTube channel called "klm5986". Centered around Call of Duty gameplay commentary, this channel often featured videos with other YouTube personalities, such as xSocrates. He later wanted to show how guns worked in real life and to compare them to how they are portrayed in video games, films, and television shows.

He got the idea for a Russian accent while working at a car dealership. One of his co-workers was Russian and he took an interest in impersonating his accent. His uncle was also a prankster and used to use the accent while talking to Kyle when he was five years old. He used the accent to create the character Dimitri and what followed was him filming himself shooting guns on his family farm in Georgia. He launched the FPSRussia channel in April 2010. Also in 2010, Myers co-founded the podcast Painkiller Already with fellow YouTubers WoodysGamertag and WingsOfRedemption; as of 2025, the show is hosted by Myers, WoodysGamertag, and MurkaDurkah.

Each FPSRussia video generally has Myers (as Dimitri) explaining the characteristics of the weapons he will use in that video (occasionally telling the history behind it and sometimes explanations of its purpose), before he demonstrates their abilities on random targets such as fruit, drink bottles, zombie mannequins, and even photos of Justin Bieber in his earlier videos. Myers has used largely varying pieces of equipment along with weapons that have been featured in his videos, such as a gold plated AK-47, an armored troop carrier, a .50 BMG rifle, a Bofors 40 mm automatic anti-aircraft cannon, and dual AA-12 shotguns.

=== Collaborative works, appearances in other media, and related ventures ===
The channel reached one-million-subscribers in June 2011. Following the channel's early success, Myers launched a second channel, MoreFPSRussia, in September 2011.

The success of FPSRussia propelled Myers to appear on other channels and media; Myers collaborated with Epic Meal Time in July 2011, and the collaboration has earned over 8.8 million video views on YouTube as of October 14, 2020. As Dimitri, Meyers hosted the live fire section of Machinima.com Prime's web series, The Controller: Medal of Honor Warfighter. On October 29, 2012, Myers had a cameo appearance as his character, Dimitri, in the Call of Duty: Black Ops II live-action trailer directed by Guy Ritchie.

After an announcement video in December 2012 and a successful Kickstarter campaign, FPSRussia released "FPS Russia: The Game" on the App Store for iOS devices in March 2013 with developer Zaah. In 2013, Myers founded another gaming channel named "FPS" that has been inactive since 2014.

=== Death of Keith Ratliff and final years of FPSRussia ===
On January 3, 2013, Keith Ratliff, the co-owner of FPS Industries (a custom firearms fabrication and testing company) and a member of the FPSRussia production team, was found shot dead in his home in Carnesville, Georgia. A coroner revealed he was shot in the head and classified his death as a homicide. Ratliff held a federal firearms license (FFL) and was responsible for obtaining the firearms used in the videos. Numerous firearms were found in his house, but none were the murder weapon.

Following Ratliff's death, the production of Myers' FPSRussia videos went on hiatus until February 19. In March, the Georgia Bureau of Investigation (GBI) said it was still investigating. However, as there have been no official updates since the initial reports following Ratliff's death, the case has become the subject of numerous conspiracy theories.

After another hiatus, this time lasting nine months, the channel resumed making videos on January 10, 2014. In 2014, FPSRussia was listed on NewMediaRockstars Top 100 Channels, ranked at #78. No videos have been released on the channel since April 2016.

== Legal issues ==
On March 29, 2013, Myers' Franklin County residence was searched by upwards of 40 members of the Bureau of Alcohol, Tobacco, Firearms and Explosives (ATF) alongside agents from the FBI. The investigators also searched Myers's father's nearby farm, a frequent filming location for FPSRussia. ATF spokesman Richard Coes said the justification for the search was "that [Myers] was using explosives and getting paid for it via YouTube."

In August 2017, Myers' residence was again raided by ATF and FBI agents after Myers was alleged to have received 25 g (0.88 oz) of butane hash oil through the mail. The Department of Justice prosecuted on the grounds that illegal drug possession while owning a firearm is a federal offense. Myers was arrested for felony possession of a controlled substance with intent to distribute and 50 of his weapons were confiscated under Section 922(g)(3) of the Gun Control Act of 1968, which prohibits illegal drug users from possessing firearms. He later pleaded guilty to Possession with Intent to Distribute Marijuana and Butane Hash Oil, with all other charges dismissed.

On June 19, 2019, Myers was sentenced to two years' probation and 56 days in prison, which he served at Federal Correctional Institution, Talladega, in 2019, as well as a fine in the amount of $7,500. Since his release from prison, Myers has spoken about the case on PKA.

== See also ==
- List of YouTubers
