= Cybergeddon =

Hypothetical global catastrophe caused by large-scale cyber attack

Cybergeddon (from tech. cyber-, "computer", and Armageddon, from Hebrew Har Megiddo, "mountain of the final battle") is a popular term in computer security, the media and international relations for a hypothetical cataclysm caused by large-scale sabotage of computerised networks, systems and data flows. The scenario typically combines cyberterrorism, cyberwarfare, cybercrime and hacktivism into cascades of attacks capable of disrupting the Internet, critical infrastructure and global financial and industrial systems.

Commentators have used the term for worst-case futures in which attacks on targets such as banks, payment systems, power grids and industrial control systems trigger systemic economic collapse or prolonged social disruption. The concept is closely related to expressions such as "cyber apocalypse", "cyber 9/11" and "cyber Pearl Harbor", which likewise denote large-scale, strategically significant cyber attacks.

Although some security professionals and policy documents have presented cybergeddon as a serious strategic risk, academic and policy debates also include more sceptical views that see such apocalyptic scenarios as exaggerated compared to the empirical record of cyber operations.

== Terminology and origins ==
Cybergeddon is a combination of cyber-, associated with computers, digital networks and cyberspace, and Armageddon, a term from the Book of Revelation that in modern usage denotes an ultimate, catastrophic battle.

== See also ==
- Cyber-attack
- Cyberwarfare
- Cyberterrorism
- Cybercrime
- Information security
- Critical infrastructure
- Global catastrophic risk
