= Shira Lazar =

Canadian actress (born 1983)

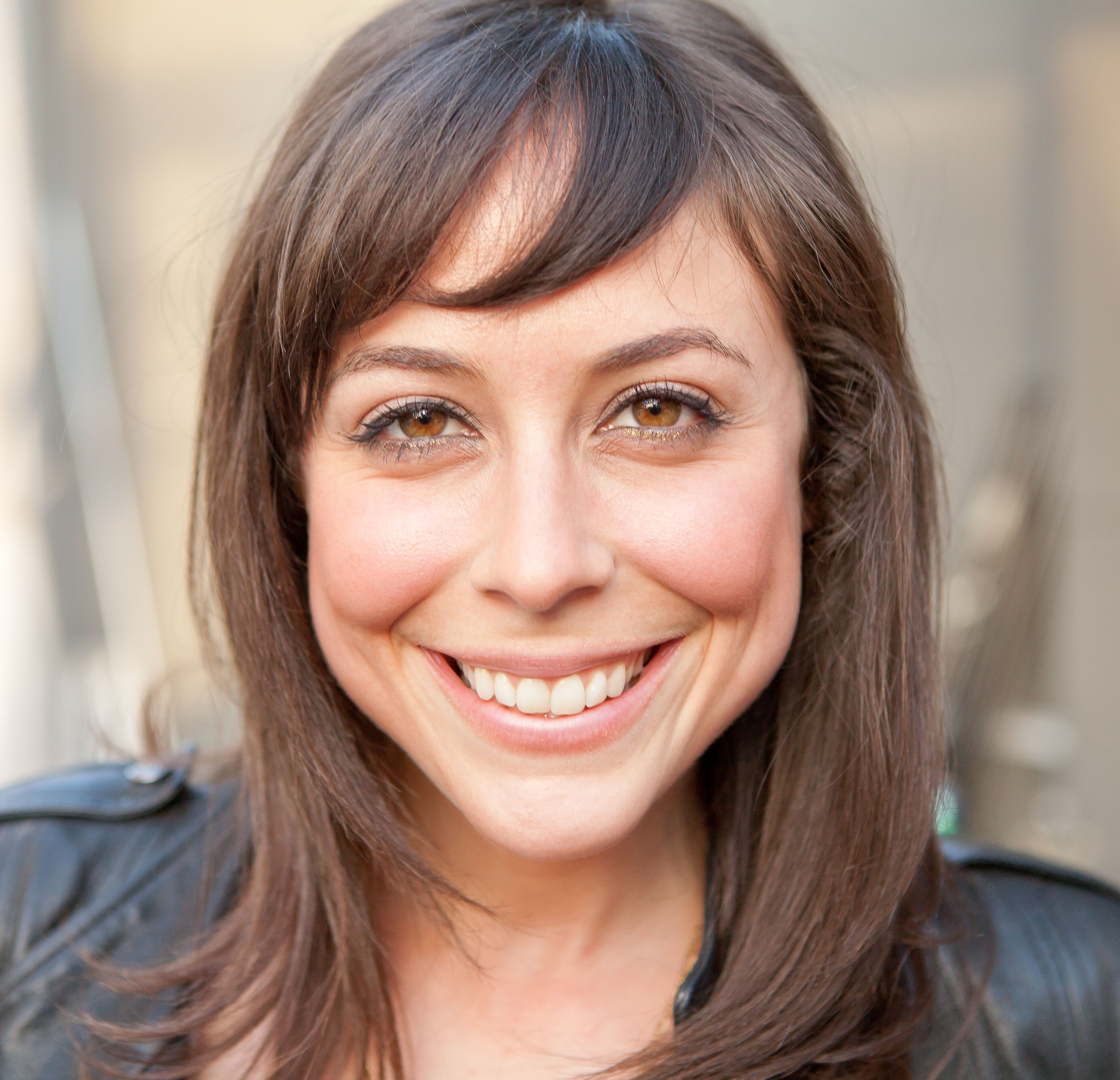
- Lazar at the 2011 SXSW
- Born: May 6, 1983 (age 43); Montreal, Quebec, Canada
- Occupations: Actress; television personality; writer; video blogger
- Known for: Lifecasting, Video journalism
- Notable work: Mahalo Daily, What's Trending
- Website: www.shiralazar.com

Shira Lazar (born May 6, 1983) is a Canadian television personality, actress, writer, and video blogger.

Lazar's writing has been featured on Hollywood.com, CBSNEWS.com, MSN.com, and others, and she has appeared as a host or as a guest at The Oscars (online red carpet host), CNN, Fox News, The Grammys, Yahoo! (Entertainment Host), Channel Q or EZ-103.1

She is also the creator, executive producer and host of What's Trending. It consists of a blog that will be updated daily, as well as a live interactive talk show covering the most popular videos on YouTube that airs daily on WhatsTrending.com.

== Biography ==
Lazar was born in Montreal, Quebec, to Jewish parents After graduating from St. George's High School she went on to study at Dawson College where she worked on The Plant newspaper. After finishing college she moved to Boston, Massachusetts, to attend Emerson College and obtained a BA in TV/Video production. Shira was the voice of the Peach in "Annoying Orange: Jalapeno ". She is the stepsister of American Apparel founder Dov Charney.

== Career ==
=== 2004–2012 ===
Lazar began her media career in 2004 as host of the College Sports Television program "1st Person". In 2005 she went on to become a host and producer for Music Plus TV and hosted celebrity Q&A video's on Yahoo. In 2006 she contributed feature pieces to Hollywood.com, and wrote that year's Oscar's awards night preview feature for Los Angeles Confidential.

Lazar developed and hosted an online reality competition for MSN.com at TasteMaker. In 2009 she became the host of the Mahalo.com online weekly video program This Week in YouTube. In April 2008 Lazar began hosting "LX TV", a lifestyle entertainment show for NBC4 in Los Angeles.

Lazar covered the latest technology and media trends in a blog for CBSNews.com called OnTheScene. Lazar is a co-founder of the digital production company DISRUPT/GROUP, which produces online content such as The Partners Project, and interview show that profiles and features viral video stars. Lazar is also a regular contributor to The Huffington Post on issues of new technology, digital life and viral web trends. In 2009 Lazar was a featured writer and blogger on Travel Channel's "Confessions of a Travel Writer".

In 2010, Lazar was a guest speaker at the Mashable and CNN Media Summit. Also in 2010, Lazar was nominated by Wired as one of the sexiest geeks of 2010. In 2011, Lazar was featured in Fast Company magazine as one of the "Most Influential Women in Technology". Lazar was also the host of Fashion's Night Out for Macy's in September 2011. Also in 2011, Lazar was featured by The Huffington Post's "Women in Tech" series as "Women in Tech You Need to Follow."

Lazar hosted the online red carpet event for the 2011 Grammy Music Awards. Lazar also hosted the live stream red carpet and backstage access for the 2011 Oscar's coverage for oscars.com.

On September 20, 2011, Lazar started a weekly blog series on Entrepreneur titled, "Social Media Breakdown." In October 2011, in partnership with MTV's A Thin Line Campaign, Lazar began an anti-bullying campaign using the Twitter hashtag #StopBullying.

On December 6, 2011, Lazar was interviewed by Leslie Bradshaw of Forbes where she stated, "Not only is Shira a powerhouse in her own right, but she is also a pioneer in the field. Many have dabbled in vlogging, but few have stuck it out and brought immense value along the way. When I think of the modern correspondent, I think of Shira."

In October 2012, Lazar was listed in Variety's Women's Impact Report 2012, under the Creatives category.

For the fourth year in a row, Lazar joined Tyler Oakley as the host of The Trevor Project's Trevor Live red carpet livestream.

=== 2015–2018 ===
In February 2015, VH1 announced a new digital series starring Lazar called, Huge on the Tube. The following month, HLN announced in March 2015, Lazar as the West Coast contributor for The Daily Share.

In April 2015, Cynopsis Media honored Lazar as one of the Top Women in Digital.

2016 saw Lazar once again return to host "Tubeathon," with IHeartRadio to benefit the American Red Cross' 2016 Giving Day, as well as the new "#LiveUnlimited" Campaign during Social Media Week in Los Angeles for the Muscular Dystrophy Association. Shira Lazar has also been broadcasting regularly on the new platform, Live.ly, the live portion of Musical.ly, where Lazar has been garnering millions of regular viewers, and hosted a 24-hour stream on the platform where the proceeds benefited the Pablove Foundation.

Ad Council's Champions for Good series, a series that spotlights "industry individuals," highlighted Shira Lazar in March 2017 as part of their campaign. In June 2017, Sinclair Broadcasting Group announced a partnership with Lazar and What's Trending to create a new show, "Circa Pop Live with Shira Lazar" that will appear on Circa News' website and Facebook page. In August of that same year Comcast announced a partnership that would have a new segment, "What's Watchable," produced by Lazar, to be shown in between episodes of Comcast's streaming service, Watchable.

2017 also saw Shira Lazar as a correspondent for Syfy's San Diego Comic-Con coverage.

In October 2018, Lazar became the host of the afternoon drive show, "Lets Go There" weekdays on the first national LGBTQ+ station Channel Q syndicated and on Radio.com.

Also in 2018, Lazar launched the lifestyle and travel series, Adventures In Curiosity, on Facebook Watch.

=== 2019-Present ===
In 2024, Lazar launched Creators 4 Mental Health organization to bring mental well being tools to the creator economy. The following year, she launched CreatorCare with Revive Health Therapy bringing discounted sliding scale therapy to creators in California. A few months later, In October 2025, the organization launched the “I am a creator 4 mental health” campaign.

That same year, Lazar released a creator mental health survey revealing the realities of the mental health of creators across North America.

In January 2026, Lazar released the creator’s Bill of Rights that she co-developed with congressman Ro Khanna. That same month, Lazar was featured on The Argonaut for her work around mental health and labor protections for the creator economy.

== What's Trending ==
On May 17, 2011, Lazar began hosting a weekly, live, interactive television show called What's Trending. The show consisted of two celebrity panelists discussing news that was currently trending or was during the week in addition to live performances and special events.

What's Trending was nominated for a 2012 Primetime Emmy for Outstanding Creative Achievement in Interactive Media, Original Interactive Television Programing.

In August 2012, What's Trending announced a partnership with YouTube to go from live weekly to daily as the "MTV of YouTube".

In December 2012, What's Trending participated in the 1st Annual Tube-A-Tweet-A-Thon." People would go to Twitter and tweet using the hashtag #Tubeathon and $1 would be donated to Covenant House to try and raise $50,000 to serve homeless youth.

In February 2013, the program was awarded a Streamy in the "Best Live Series" category.

In June 2013, What's Trending received a seven-figure investment from Bedrocket Media Ventures to expand production, distribution, and ad sales.

In 2014, HLN announced a development deal with What's Trending. Also in 2014, Marriott announced What's Trending as part of their development studio slate. As part of that partnership, Marriott celebrated its Millionth Mobile check-in with Lazar and Jeana Smith, founder of Prank vs Prank. Marriott would later announce a new series, in partnership with What's Trending, titled Experiences.

In 2015, the International Academy of Web Television announced Lazar as a nominee for Best Live Host.

What's Trending partnered with Samsung to provide live coverage from the Consumer Electronics Show in January 2015, as well as South by Southwest in March.

Also in 2015, What's Trending announced a new COO in James Haffner, who most recently acted as an executive producer for DeFranco Creative.

In 2021, What's Trending launched a weekly LGBTQ news show in co-production with Revry.

In 2024, What’s Trending launched Creator Spotlight interview series with PRophet, a division of Stagwell

In October 2025, What’s Trending released the Creator Ecosphere map with media cartographer Evan Shapiro.

== Personal life ==
In 2019, Shira Lazar discussed her breakup with Bart Baker on the Syd Wilder podcast. She resides and works in Los Angeles.
