= Kit-of-parts =

Construction design paradigm; prefab but also easily dismantled

Kit-of-parts theory refers to the study and application of object-oriented building techniques, where building components are pre-designed / pre-engineered / pre-fabricated for inclusion in joint-based (linear element), panel-based (planar element), module-based (solid element), and deployable (time element) construction systems.

== Construction ==
Kit-of-parts construction is a special subset of pre-fabrication that not only attempts to achieve flexibility in assembly and efficiency in manufacture, but also by definition requires a capacity for demountability, disassembly, and reuse. Kit-of-parts structures can be assembled and taken apart in a variety of ways like a construction toy. In 2023, a consortium led by Akerlof Ltd were commissioned by MHCLG to develop a digital kit of parts for low rise housing, using MMC.

== Architecture ==
Kit-of-parts architecture involves organizing the individual parts and raw material in a building into assemblies of standard easy-to-manufacture components, sized for convenient handling or according to shipping constraints. The construction of the building is carried out on the assembly level as opposed to the raw material level. The architect defines a parts library describing every major assembly in the building. The assemblies are conceived in a systematic way, based on certain rules such as increment, size, or by shape grammar. Standard, simple connections between the assemblies are carefully defined, so the number of possible shapes and appearance the parts can take is limitless.

== Philosophy ==
Kit-of-parts philosophy goes hand in hand with advanced manufacturing, automation, and computer and information technologies. Handling multiple identical components as instances of a master element is an efficient use of the computer in the planning stage, and use of standard components can take advantage of mass-production and mass-customization manufacturing technologies.

== MESR ==
Some engineering fields refer to kit-of-parts using the acronym MESR, which stands for the following:

- Modular – Systems and subsystems are designed such that discrete unit processes can be replaced with upgraded / enhanced technology as it becomes available.
- Extensible – Initial components and subsystems delivered with a structure or vehicle are not discarded or replaced as additional unit processes are added during subsequent stages of development.
- Scalable – Components and subsystems can be coupled / decoupled as required to accommodate specific design loads.
- Reconfigurable – Components and subsystems can be moved between locations and / or subsystems to perform a similar or identical function.

== See also ==
- E. Ambasz (Ed.). (1972). Italy: The New Domestic Landscape, Achievements and Problems of Italian Design. New York: The Museum of Modern Art.
- A. Allison (2002). PREFAB. Salt Lake City: Gibbs Smith.
- C. Davies (1988). High Tech Architecture. London: Thames and Hudson.
- I. Ebong (2005). Kit Homes Modern. New York, NY, USA: Harper Collins Publishers.
- S. Kendall; J. Teicher (2000). Residential Open Building. London & New York: E & FN Spon.
- R. Kronenburg (2002). Houses in Motion. Great Britain: Wiley-Academy.
- R. Kronenburg (2003). Portable Architecture. Oxford: Elsevier / Architectural Press.
- K. Kurokawa (1977). Metabolism in Architecture. Boulder, Colorado: Westview Press, Inc.
- T. Nakamura (ed.). (1988). Norman Foster 1964–1987. A + U Architecture and Urbanism, May Extra Edition.
- M. Pawley (1993). Future Systems: The Story of Tomorrow. London: Phaidon Press Limited.
- J. Siegal (2002). Mobile: The art of portable architecture. USA: Princetion Architectutal Press.
- W. J. Van Heuvel (1992). Structuralism in Dutch Architecture. Rotterdam: Uitgeverij Publishers.
