= CMUcam =

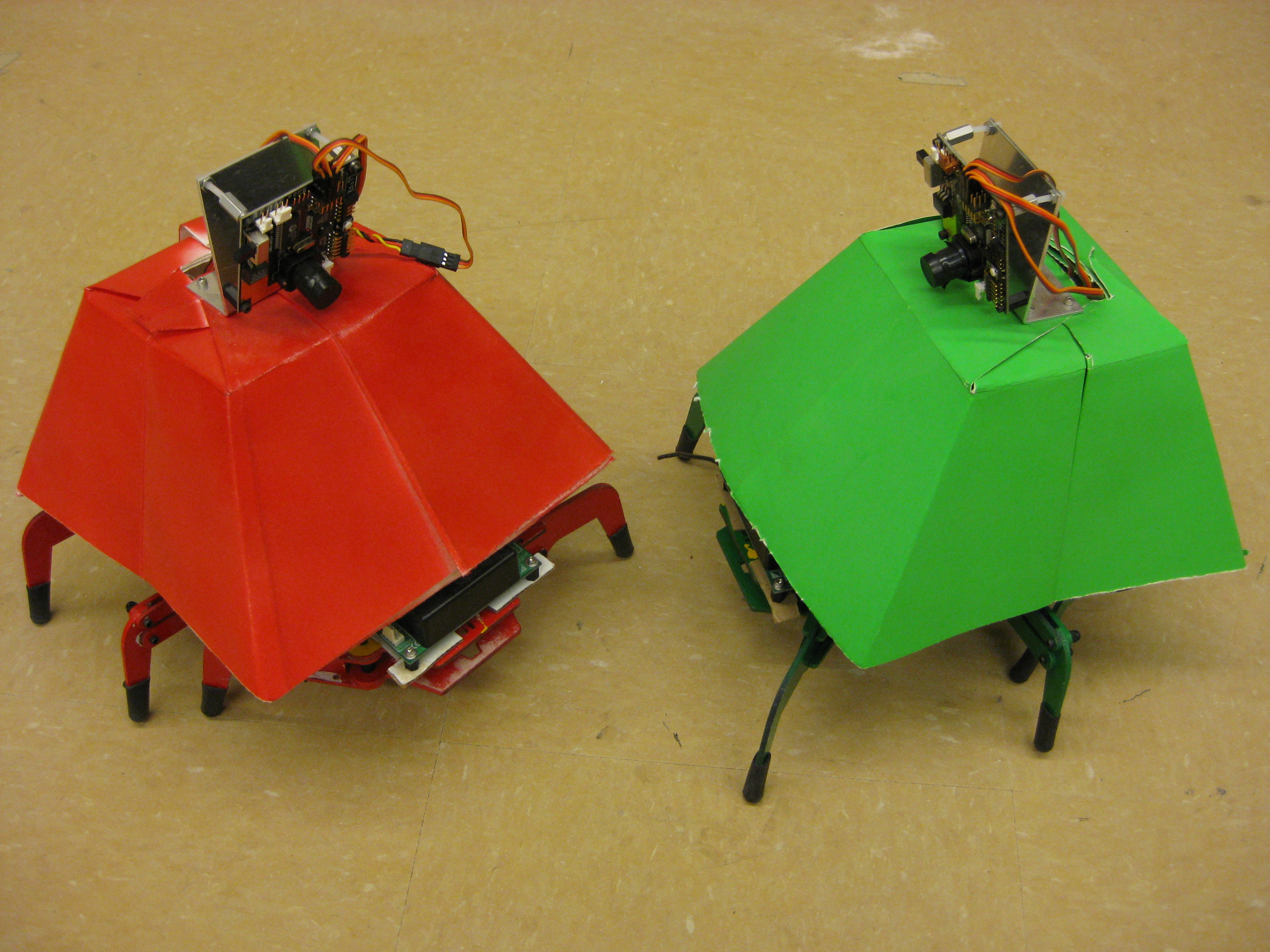
Two hexapod robots at the Georgia Institute of Technology with CMUCams mounted on top

A CMUcam is a low cost computer vision device intended for robotics research. CMUcams consist of a small video camera and a microcontroller with a serial interface. While other digital cameras typically use a much higher bandwidth connector, the CMUcam's lightweight interface allows it to be accessed by microcontrollers. More importantly, the on-board microprocessor supports simple image processing and color blob tracking, making rudimentary computer vision capable in systems that would previously have far too little power to do such a thing. It has been used in past years by the high-school FIRST Robotics Competition as a way of letting participants' robots track field elements and navigate autonomously. The CMUcam also has an extremely small form factor. For these reasons, it is relatively popular for making small, mobile robots.

The original design was originally made by Carnegie Mellon University, who has licensed it to various manufacturers.

== Current Version ==
Pixy2 is the latest in the line of CMUcam sensors. It adds line tracking capability and an onboard light source to the previous CMUcam5, a.k.a. original Pixy. These sensors are produced in collaboration with Charmed Labs in Austin, TX.
