= Mark Malkoff =

American comedian and writer

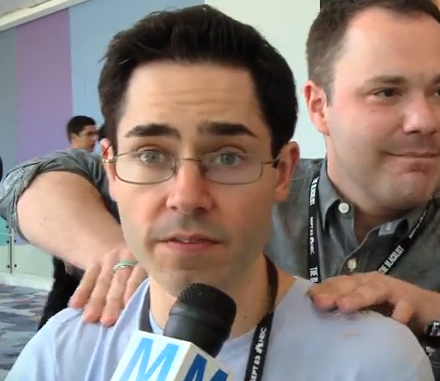
- Malkoff being massaged by Wilson Cleveland in 2013
- Born: New York City, U.S.

Comedy career
- Medium: Television
- Website: www.markmalkoff.com

Mark Malkoff is an American comedian, writer, and filmmaker. He is a graduate of New York University and currently lives in New York City, where he hosts The Inside Late Night podcast. He is the creator and host of The Carson Podcast (2014 to 2022) and author of Love Johnny Carson: One Obsessive Fan's Journey to Find the Genius Behind the Legend . He is the brother of Dave Malkoff, creator of the Side Hustle TV series.

== Career ==
=== The Carson Podcast ===
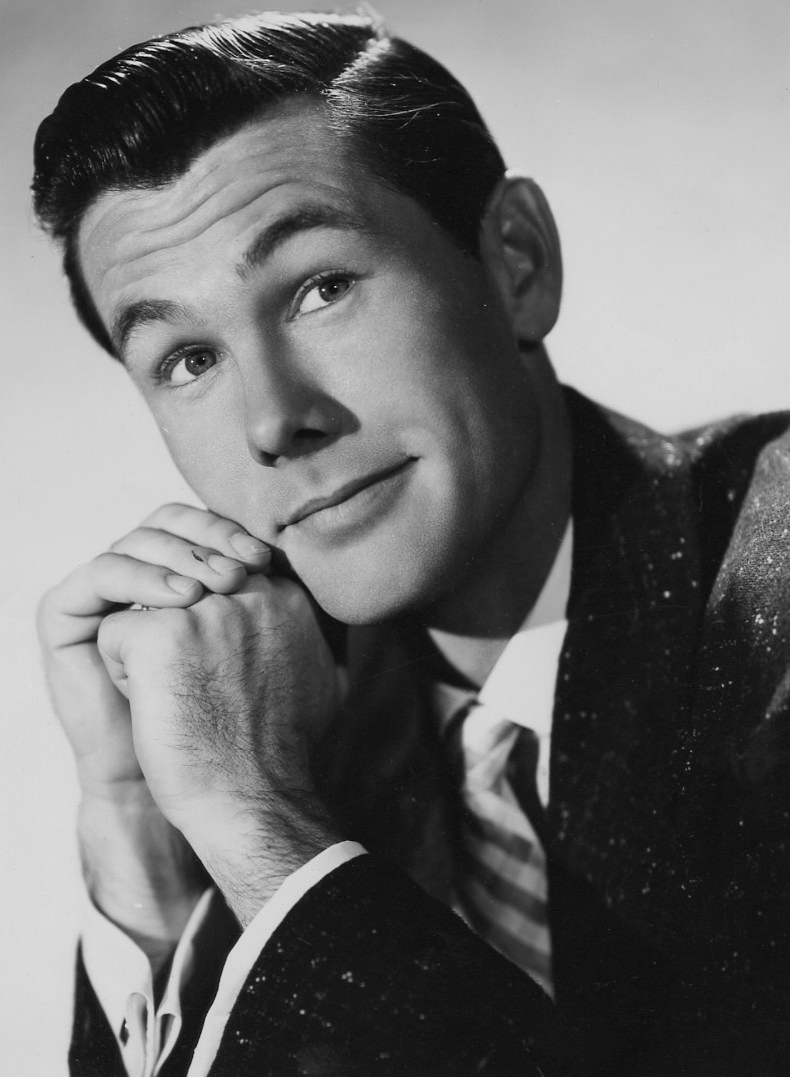
Johnny Carson at age 32

Malkoff currently makes videos for the comedy website My Damn Channel and has hosted The Carson Podcast since February 18, 2014, a single-microphone weekly audio interview series in which he examines the career of talk show host Johnny Carson by interviewing employees and guests of The Tonight Show Starring Johnny Carson, an NBC-TV television program broadcast for almost thirty years from 1962 to 1992. He has also interviewed some of the few surviving staff members of Carson's three earlier television series, Carson's Cellar (1951–53), The Johnny Carson Show (1955-56) and Who Do You Trust? (1957-1962; originally entitled Do You Trust Your Wife? for most of the first year of Carson's tenure, until July 1958).

Malkoff's guests have included Dick Cavett (who also discusses former Tonight Show host Jack Paar in depth), Mort Sahl, Peter Bogdanovich, John Landis, Chevy Chase, Dave Thomas, Steven Wright, Brooke Shields, Teri Garr, Carl Reiner, Mel Brooks, Kate Capshaw, Shecky Greene, Kliph Nesteroff, Michael J. Fox, Larry King, Tom Brokaw, Tonight Show bandleader Doc Severinsen and dozens of comedians, writers, singers, actors and backstage personnel who appeared on or worked for The Tonight Show, including the fellow who pulled the curtain open for Carson and guests as they entered the stage. Every interview is readily available online for free and the audio runtime is approximately an hour to an hour and forty-five minutes in most cases, although a few are shorter and several are longer. Several guests have appeared more than once, including Cavett, Reiner, Rich Little and Charles Grodin.

=== Public stunts ===
Malkoff has engaged in a series of public stunts, often involving unusual behavior in public places or setting records and documenting the results.

Malkoff gained worldwide media attention when he made a video detailing his attempt to visit all 171 Starbucks franchises in Manhattan in a single day during the summer of 2007. He made headlines in January 2008 when he moved into an IKEA store in Paramus, New Jersey for a week as his apartment was fumigated.

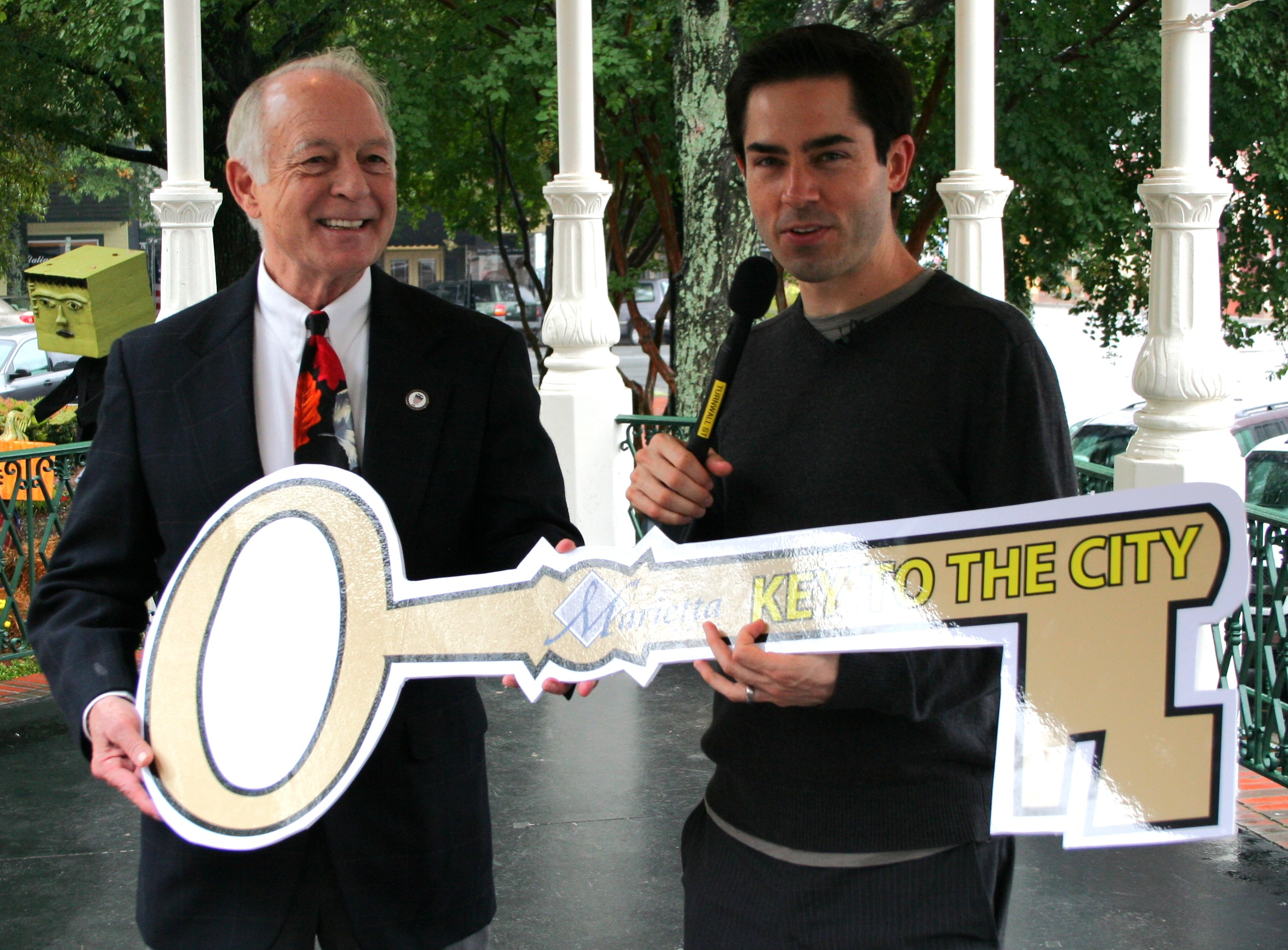
Malkoff (right) receiving the Key to the City to Marietta, Georgia from Mayor William B. Dunaway in October 2009

In June 2009, Malkoff lived on an AirTran jet for 30 days in order to conquer his fear of flying. After completing this endeavor, he broke the Guinness World Record for most flights taken in a 30-day period with 135 flight segments. On October 5 of that same year, Malkoff traveled for four weeks in a Ford Fusion Hybrid around the country seeing how many U.S. mayors he could get to present him their key to the city. As of December 20, 2009, Malkoff has been presented 95 keys from mayors of cities that include Baltimore; Milwaukee; Tampa, Fla., Harrisburg, Pa.; Frederick, Md.; Durham, N.C.; Marietta, Ga.; and Fairfax, Va.

On January 20, 2010 Malkoff wrote a piece for Huffington Post entitled "The Will Ferrell Curse" which was featured by Nikki Finke on Deadline Hollywood. In it Malkoff discusses the fact that every time Will Ferrell has appeared as the first guest on a talk show, the show has not made it past a season. Ferrell appeared as the first guest on The Tonight Show with Conan O'Brien, The Megan Mullally Show, and John McEnroe's talk show McEnroe, which aired on CNBC. In February of that year, Malkoff made headlines again with a video in which to disprove the myth that New Yorkers are rude he was physically carried 9.4 miles in Manhattan by 155 individuals.

In April 2011 Malkoff raced a crosstown Manhattan bus while riding a Big Wheel tricycle to point out how slow the buses in New York are. In July of that year, Malkoff tried to get thrown out of a Manhattan Apple Store with stunts that included having a pizza delivered, bringing in a band to play live music, bringing in a pet goat, and trying to have a quiet candlelit dinner with his wife. In August 2011, Malkoff launched "101 other things to do in Holland," besides the smoking of weed, including ascending the 328-foot high Euromast tower in Rotterdam, trying to pay off the U.S. debt by collecting money in the Vondelpark in Amsterdam, and fooling around with street performers at the Dam square in Amsterdam. On September 29, 2011, Malkoff gave free cab rides out in New York with the catch of strange behavior and other quirks from the driver, as well as antics such as the passenger area slowly filling with popcorn.

In April 2012, Malkoff tested the limits of Netflix by watching as many movies as he could in one month. During the month, he watched 252 movies from opening to ending credits. For being the heaviest Netflix user that month, Malkoff was invited to Netflix Headquarters where he met Reed Hastings, CEO of Netflix. In August 2013, Malkoff used Skype to video chat with residents of 162 countries, including North Korea.
