= React (media franchise) =

Web series media franchise

- Created by: The Fine Brothers
- Owner: React Media
- Years: 2010-present

Films and television
- Television series: React to That (December 2014 – January 2015)
- Web series: Kids React (2010–present); Teens React (2011–present); Elders React (2012–present); YouTubers React (2012–present) (Note: 2012-2021 as YouTubers React with episodes being regularly released, and 2021-present as Creators React with unscheduled episodes.); Adults React (2015–present)

Miscellaneous
- YouTube channel: React (2009–present); People Vs Food (2014–present)

React is a media franchise created and owned by React Media, LLC, consisting of several web series centering on a group of individuals reacting to viral videos, fads, video games, film trailers, or music videos.

== History ==
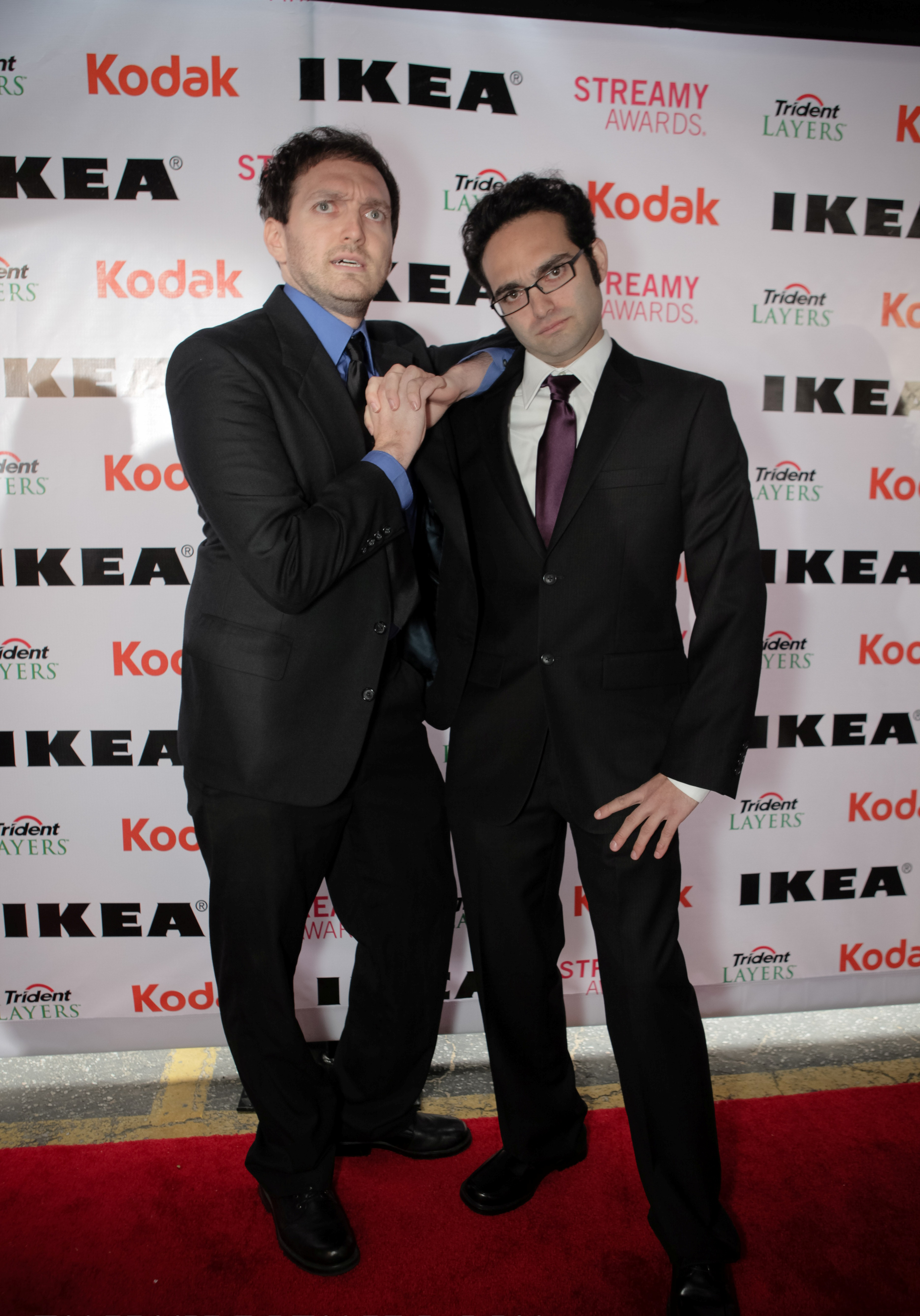
The Fine Brothers, creators of the React franchise.

The franchise was launched with the YouTube debut of Kids React in October 2010, and then grew to encompass four more series uploaded on the Fine Brothers' primary YouTube channel, a separate YouTube channel with various reaction-related content, as well as a television series titled React to That.

In 2016, the duo announced React World, a program and channel in which they would license the format of their React shows to creators, which led to widespread negative reception from viewers and fellow content creators, as well as confusion about what their format is. This eventually lead to the Fine Brothers removing all videos related to React World, essentially pulling the plug on the React World program.

== YouTube series ==
REACT

YouTube information
- Channels: REACT; Teens REACT; Bullseye
- Years active: 2007–present
- Subscribers: 20.1 million (main channel); 22.2 million (combined) (Note: Subscribers, broken down by channel: 20.1 million (REACT) 1.11 million (Teens REACT) 1.01 million (Bullseye))
- Views: 13.6 billion (main channel); 14.1 billion (combined) (Note: Views, broken down by channel: 13.6 billion (REACT) 400 million (Teens REACT) 118 million (Bullseye))
- Last updated: October 22, 2025

=== Kids React ===
Benny and Rafi Fine launched a series titled Kids React on October 16, 2010, the first video being "Kids React to Viral Videos (Double Rainbow, Obama Fail, Twin Rabbits, Snickers Halloween)". The Kids React series features The Fine Brothers (and one of the staff members since 2016), off-camera, showing kids ages 4–14 (7–13 as of September 2016, 7–11 as of October 2016) several viral videos or popular YouTubers and having the kids react to the videos.

The most popular Kids React episode to date is "Kids React to Gay Marriage", with over 40.2 million views as of September 2, 2018. The popularity of Kids React made it possible for the online series to win a special Emmy Award at the 39th Daytime Emmy Awards in 2012. The Emmy Award, that was given in cooperation with AOL, was awarded to the Fine Brothers for "Best Viral Video Series". After their Emmy win, the brothers explained, "Not a lot has changed [after winning the Emmy] other than realizing that there are shows on YouTube like React that can get similar if not better viewership than mainstream entertainment can."

Videos and YouTube stars that have been reacted to by the kids include Smosh (who later reacted to the kids' reactions), planking and President Obama addressing the death of Osama bin Laden, among several other topics. Kids React has been compared to Kids Say the Darndest Things. In October 2012, the kids of the show were shown videos of the 2012 U.S. presidential debates. Kids React won the Streamy Award for Best Non-Fiction or Reality Series in 2013.

=== Teens React ===
Due to the popularity of Kids React, The Fine Brothers spawned a spin-off dubbed Teens React on November 17, 2011, with "TEENS REACT TO TWILIGHT". The show has a similar premise to Kids React, however the younger stars are replaced with high school teenagers aged 14–19, some of whom have aged out of the Kids React series. Due to this, the Fine Brothers are able to show more mature and less "kid-friendly" videos such as videos on topics like Toddlers & Tiaras, Rick Perry's Strong commercial, Amanda Todd's death, and the 2012 U.S. presidential debates. Other viral videos and YouTube stars that have been reacted to include Salad Fingers, the Overly Attached Girlfriend, "Gangnam Style", The Hunger Games trailer, Shane Dawson, and One Direction, among other topics. Later on, The Fine Brothers launched a series titled Teens React: Gaming consisting videos of teenagers reacting to popular games such as Mario Kart 64, Flappy Bird, Rocket League, and Five Nights at Freddy's. Teens React launched the career of Lia Marie Johnson, it also featured some "famous" 'reactors' as guest stars, including Lisa Cimorelli, Amy Cimorelli, Lucas Cruikshank (who later appears in YouTubers React), Alex Steele, Jake Short, and Maisie Williams.

=== Other React series ===
Some other React series produced by React Media include:

- Elders React (debuted 2012)
- YouTubers React (debuted 2012, retitled to Creators React in 2020)
- Adults React (debuted 2015)
- Parents React (debuted 2015)
- College Kids React (debuted 2016)

=== One-off episodes ===
In April 2014, as an April Fools joke, the Fine Brothers teamed up with Friskies and released Cats React, which went viral. In July 2016 they released another part of Cats React.

In August 2014, they released Celebrities React to Viral Videos, and now re-released yearly.

In April 2018, in another April Fools joke, they released "Teens React to Nothing" where they showed the teenagers on a blank screen. The following year, they released a sequel, "nothing reacts to teens react to nothing.", which featured the original video being played in an empty studio.

== React YouTube channel ==
After creating four individual successful React series on their primary YouTube channel, the Fine Brothers launched a separate YouTube channel in 2014, for reaction-related content, simply dubbed "React". With the intent of running programming five days a week, the channel launched with five series: React Gaming (a Let's Play-style series with real youths from their primary React series), Advice (a series featuring real youths respond to questions from viewers), React Remix (musical remixes of past React footage), People Vs. Food (originally Kids Vs. Food until 2016) (a series featuring Reactors taste-test "Weird" or international foods), and Lyric Breakdown (a series in which Reactors break down the meaning of various songs). The channel launched with a teenage-focused playthrough of Goat Simulator. From September 18, 2020, to May 31, 2021, the React YouTube channel was retitled to "REPLAY", following the renaming of the main FBE channel to "REACT" in the wake of FBE's distancing from Benny and Rafi Fine as a consequence of the scandal in Summer 2020 that led to many reactors leaving the channel. On June 1, 2021, REPLAY was retitled "PEOPLE VS FOOD" and moved all the non-food videos to REACT.

== React to That ==
In early 2014, it was announced that the Fine Brothers made a deal with NCredible Entertainment, a production studio founded by Nick Cannon to develop a television series for Nickelodeon. The series, dubbed React to That, was "entirely re-envisioned for television," as the reactors "not only watch and respond to viral videos, but pop out of the reaction room and into showdowns where the clips come to life as each reactor is confronted with a challenge based on the video they just watched." Following the announcement of the series, Benny Fine explained, "All these viewers now watching are also pioneering what it is to be a viewer of content. They follow us through all of our different endeavors, all our different series, and now will have the opportunity to follow us to another medium." Nickelodeon ordered 13 episodes to be produced, but only 12 were made and aired.

== React World ==
=== Background ===
In July 2015, the Fine Brothers filed for trademark protection on "React" with the U.S. Patent and Trademark Office (USPTO). The trademark was filed for "Entertainment services, namely, providing an ongoing series of programs and webisodes via the internet in the field of observing and interviewing various groups of people." The USPTO approved for a 30-day opposition period which was set to begin on February 2, 2016; if no parties filed an opposition to the Fines' trademark request, it would have proceeded through the process. The brothers had recently filed for and been granted trademark registrations for "Elders React" and "Teens React" in 2013 as well as "Kids React" in 2012.

=== Announcement details ===
On January 26, 2016, the Fines announced that they would be launching React World, a way to grant content creators the license to create their own versions of the React shows. Specifically, the Fine Brothers explained they were going to license the format of their React shows. A Variety report detailed that React World would "aggregate videos in a channel to launch later this year to promote, support and feature fan-produced programming based on their shows." The brothers' company, Fine Brothers Entertainment (FBE) explained they would be working with YouTube and ChannelMeter on the launch of React World. FBE also expressed they would be able to monetize React-style videos uploaded under their license. On monetization, Digital Trends detailed "Although licenses are free, React World creators must agree to share 20 percent of AdSense revenue and 30 percent of premium brand deals with FBE." Additionally, the Fines explained they would provide ongoing production guidance, creative guidelines, format bibles, and other resources, as well as promotional and technical support to those creators who participated with the brothers on React World.

=== Reception ===
Although YouTube's VP on content partnerships, Kelly Merryman, originally proclaimed "This is brand-building in the YouTube age — rising media companies building their brands through collaborations with creators around the world," the Fine Brothers were met with overwhelmingly negative reception to their React World announcement. BBC News reported that "critics of the Fine Brothers have expressed concern they may use the trademarks to stifle competition," and quoted one YouTuber who detailed "People don't trust them because a few years ago when Ellen DeGeneres did a similar video—not that similar, it didn't have the same format or branding—they claimed it was their format." Viewers and fellow content creators alike condemned the Fines for their announcement, with The Daily Dot reporting, "Backlash poured in on Reddit and social media, and other YouTubers posted their own reactions and parodies of the enthusiastically corporate React World announcement video." The backlash led to a dramatic drop in subscribers, with upwards of 675,000 (Note: As of February 22, 2016. Not including positive subs counts.) accounts collectively unsubscribing from the React and Fine Bros Entertainment channels as well as recent videos getting many dislikes in protest as of February 22, 2016. Mashable described that one Reddit post "ignited a thread of haters, defenders and overall discussion about whether what Fine Brothers Entertainment is doing is fair." Ryan Morrison, a gamer, lawyer and Reddit user, declared that he would file a legal challenge to the Fine Brothers' trademark request on "React", writing "These guys didn't come up with the idea of filming funny reactions from kids. And they certainly don't own an entire genre of YouTube videos. It wasn't their idea, and it's not theirs to own or police."

Though there was an overwhelmingly negative response to the React World announcement, other personalities expressed milder opinions; Internet personality Hank Green wrote "This could actually be a very cool project if it could be divorced from the idea of two very powerful creators attempting to control a very popular YouTube video format. Franchising one of YouTube's biggest shows? Yeah, I'd love to see how that goes." New York reporter Jay Hathaway wrote "The trademark and React World are dead. And that's a shame, because it was an interesting idea that suffered from tone-deaf execution."

=== Responses and discontinuation by the Fine Brothers ===
After seeing the initial backlash from their announcement, The Fine Brothers posted comments on various social media websites including Facebook, Twitter, Reddit, and the comment section of their YouTube announcement video. On Facebook the Fines wrote, "We do not own the idea or copyright for reaction videos overall, nor did we ever say we did. You don't need anyone's permission to make these kinds of videos, and we're not coming after anyone", adding "We are in no way claiming reaction content in general is our intellectual property. This is purely a voluntary program for people wanting direct support from us, and we continue to be so excited to work with all of you who may want to participate". They additionally tweeted "We're not saying we hold a copyright on reaction videos overall, no one can. We're licensing our specific shows, like TV has done for years". The brothers also explained they would "not be trying to take revenue from other types of reaction videos, and will not be copyright-striking". However, other YouTubers have reported multiple copyright related video takedowns. The Guardian also reported that unrelated channels featuring diverse groups of people reacting to videos were also removed after takedown requests from the Fine Brothers; the "Seniors React" video was noted to be released prior to the Fines launching their Elders React series. The Fines also posted an update video in response to what they described as "confusion and negative response" to React World, in which they try to clear up confusion on what their format encompasses, as well as inviting viewers to e-mail them about any further questions.

Ultimately, the Fine Brothers removed all React World videos, and posted a statement on Medium, declaring they have filed the paperwork to rescind all their "React" trademarks and applications, will discontinue the React World program, and will release all past Content ID claims. In their post, the brothers expressed "It makes perfect sense for people to distrust our motives here, but we are confident that our actions will speak louder than these words moving forward". Reaction to this Medium post was negative on Reddit, where users were reported commenting they would not forgive the Fine Brothers.

== Accolades ==
Year	Nominated work	Category	Award-giving body	Result	Ref.
2012	Kids React	Best Viral Video Series	39th Daytime Creative Arts Emmy Awards	Won	
2012	Kids React	Best Variety Web Series	Inaugural IAWTV Awards	Won	
2013	Kids React	Best Variety Series	2013 IAWTV Awards	Nominated	
2013	Kids React	Best Non-Fiction or Reality Series	3rd Streamy Awards	Won	
2014	Kids React	Best Directing (Non-Fiction)	2014 IAWTV Awards	Nominated	
2014	Kids React	Best Variety Web Series	2014 IAWTV Awards	Won	
2014	Kids React	Kids and Family	4th Streamy Awards	Won	
2014	Kids React	Editing	4th Streamy Awards	Won	
2014	Kids React	Audience Choice for Show of the Year	4th Streamy Awards	Nominated	
2015	Kids React	Best Children's Series	2015 IAWTV Awards	Nominated	
2015	Kids React	Best Variety Series	2015 IAWTV Awards	Nominated	
2015	Kids React	Best Directing (Non-Fiction)	2015 IAWTV Awards	Nominated	
2015	Kids React	Best Writing (Non-Fiction)	2015 IAWTV Awards	Nominated	
2015	Kids React	Non-Fiction	5th Streamy Awards	Nominated	
2015	Kids React	Kids and Family	5th Streamy Awards	Nominated	
2015	Teens React	Audience Choice for Show of the Year	5th Streamy Awards	Nominated	
2017	REACT	Audience Choice for Show Of The Year	7th Annual Streamy Awards	Nominated	

== See also ==
- Reaction video
