= What's Trending =

- Created by: Shira Lazar
- Developed by: Disrupt/Group
- Starring: Shira Lazar
- Theme music composer: Mike Relm
- Country of origin: United States
- Original language: English
- No. of seasons: 4

Production
- Executive producers: Damon Berger, Shira Lazar
- Running time: 22-48 minutes

Original release
- Release: May 15, 2011 – October 4, 2014

What's Trending is an entertainment publisher founded by Shira Lazar, and Damon Berger under What's Trending, Inc.

== Origin ==
What's Trending started as an American live television show with CBS Interactive that streamed on CBSNews.com and YouTube. Shira Lazar starred as the host, who anchored the show since its inception. What's Trending featured segments on pop culture, music, and movies, including trending videos and personalities on the internet.

The show debuted on May 15, 2011 and originally streamed live once a week. On August 20, 2012, the show rebranded itself and expanded to stream five days a week covering the most popular videos on YouTube.

What's Trending eventually went separate ways from CBS Interactive and operated under its own publisher entity under What's Trending, Inc.

== CBS show format ==
The show consisted of a daily 'Trending Now' top 5 video countdown that showcases the biggest viral videos of the day on YouTube. Throughout the week, different segments feature musical performances, packages featuring curated lists of videos on YouTube, and interviews with high-profile celebrities and YouTube talent.

- Guests included: will.i.am, Larry King, Mark Cuban, Lisa Kudrow, Stan Lee, Kevin Smith, Jason Mewes, Burnie Burns, Drew Carey, iJustine, Spoken Reasons, Cimorelli, Kendrick Lamar, Talib Kweli, Big Sean, Jenna Marbles, Tony Hsieh, Dustin Lance Black, Jon Landeau, The Gregory Brothers, Antoine Dodson, Incubus, George Takei, Orlando Jones, Riff Raff, Skylar Grey, Danny Trejo, Felicia Day, Paul Scheer, Gilbert Gottfried, Cody Simpson, Snoop Dogg, Jon M. Chu, T.J. Miller, John Cena, Shaquille O'Neal, Billy Corgan, Robert Rodriguez, Common, Chris Hardwick, Margaret Cho, Eve, Russell Simmons, Bobak Ferdowsi, Adam DeVine, Anders Holm, Blake Anderson, Dominic Monaghan, Pentatonix, Romany Malco, Mia Rose, Chelsea Kane and Greg Grunberg.

What's Trending worked in conjunction with MTV's O Music Awards as well as the American non-profit organization The Trevor Project to stream their yearly event. Actor Daniel Radcliffe participated in a live chat on the show discussing The Trevor Project.

What's Trending conducted interviews with Arnold Schwarzenegger, while promoting his autobiography, Total Recall: My Unbelievably True Life Story, and was one of the first news outlets to interview Bobak Ferdowsi after the successful launch of the Curiosity rover.

What's Trending title card in 2012

=== The Lupe Fiasco incident ===
On June 7, rapper/producer Lupe Fiasco was interviewed during the program and said, "My fight against terrorism, to me, the biggest terrorist is Obama in the United States of America." On June 20, Lupe Fiasco appeared on the Fox News show The O'Reilly Factor defending his comments.

=== Departure from CBS News ===
On September 10, 2011 CBS News ended its relationship with Lazar and the show after a tweet was posted by a junior staffer claiming Apple co-founder Steve Jobs had died. A formal apology was issued live at the beginning of the September 13 show, The show carried on independently through partnerships with Ustream and Livestream. Marc Hustvedt of Tubefilter wrote, "The show itself is still groundbreaking, and arguably the most polished half-hour live show on the internet right now. It brings intelligent people together to talk about top news stories in an informative way."

=== Critical reception ===
Steve Rosenbaum of Huffington Post wrote, "It's clear that CBS is committed to this story -- jumping past the cheesy bluescreen or robo-set and building Lazar and her team a truly 'webified' set that is both high tech and modern. When the network springs for a set, you know they're in it for the long run." Mike Hale of The New York Times wrote, "What's really new about "What's Trending," and most of interest to Watchlist, is simply the fact that it's a live, scheduled half-hour Web show being done on the site of a major broadcast television network (and with a major corporate sponsor AT&T). That's revolutionary, whether the subject is social networking or retirement planning." Marshall Kirkpatrick of Read Write Web wrote, "It will all be run through the living experiment of multi-platform viewer engagement that What's Trending is using and building at the same time. It's an effort that could help illuminate some developments in the future of entertainment on the web and it's ambitious enough to be downright inspirational."

== Post CBS News departure ==
On June 17, 2013, Bedrocket Media Ventures made a seven figure investment in the series after CBS News cut ties with the team.

What's Trending developed daily video content and launched its owned and operated site. What's Trending circulated content using its O&O content to properties including MSN, Yahoo, Video Elephant, Reach TV, Dailymotion and more.

- In 2014, HLN announced a development deal with What's Trending.
- In 2014, Marriott announced What's Trending as part of their development studio slate. As part of that partnership, Marriott celebrated its Millionth Mobile check-in with Lazar and Jeana Smith, founder of Prank vs Prank. Marriott would later announce a new series, in partnership with What's Trending, titled Experiences.
- In 2015, What's Trending announced a new COO in James Haffner, who acted as an executive producer for DeFranco Creative.
- What's Trending partnered with Samsung to provide live coverage from the Consumer Electronics Show in January 2015, as well as South by Southwest in March.
- In June 2017, Sinclair Broadcasting Group announced a partnership with Lazar and What's Trending to create a new show, "Circa Pop Live with Shira Lazar" that will appear on Circa News' website and Facebook page. In August of that same year Comcast announced a partnership that would have a new segment, "What's Watchable," produced by Lazar, to be shown in between episodes of Comcast's streaming service, Watchable.
- In December 2018, What's Trending announced a partnership with Gas Station TV, where viewers can see reports nationwide across their 18,000 locations.
- In 2021, What's Trending launched a weekly LGBTQ news show in co-production with Revry.
- What's Trending partnered with Screenvision Media in 2023 to produce the 'Front and Center' show before movie theater screenings.

=== Notable causes ===
In December 2012, What's Trending participated in the first "Tube-A-Tweet-A-Thon". People would go to Twitter and tweet using the hashtag #Tubeathon and $1 would be donated to Covenant House to try and raise $50,000 to serve homeless youth.

=== Awards and nominations ===
- In July 2012, What's Trending received nominations for the Primetime Emmy Awards for Outstanding Achievement in Original Interactive Programming.
- What's Trending on CBS News received a 2012 Webby Award Nominations for Best Host and Best Variety Show. On January 12, the IAWTV held their award show in Las Vegas, in conjunction with the Consumer Electronics Show. There, What's Trending received four awards: Best Directing (Non-Fiction) - Brett Register, Best Host (Live) - Shira Lazar, Best Interactive/Social Media Experience and Best Hosted Live Web Series.
- In February 2013, What's Trending won a Streamy Award for Best Live Series.
- In 2015, the International Academy of Web Television announced Lazar as a nominee for Best Live Host.
