= 1st Streamy Awards =

2009 awards ceremony recognizing online video

- Date: March 28, 2009
- Location: Wadsworth Theatre; Los Angeles, California
- Presented by: International Academy of Web Television
- Hosted by: Tubefilter, NewTeeVee, Tilzy.TV
- Preshow host: Shira Lazar

Highlights
- Most awards: Dr. Horrible's Sing-Along Blog (6)
- Most nominations: The Guild (12)
- Audience Choice: The Guild (Best Web Series)

Television/radio coverage
- Network: YouTube

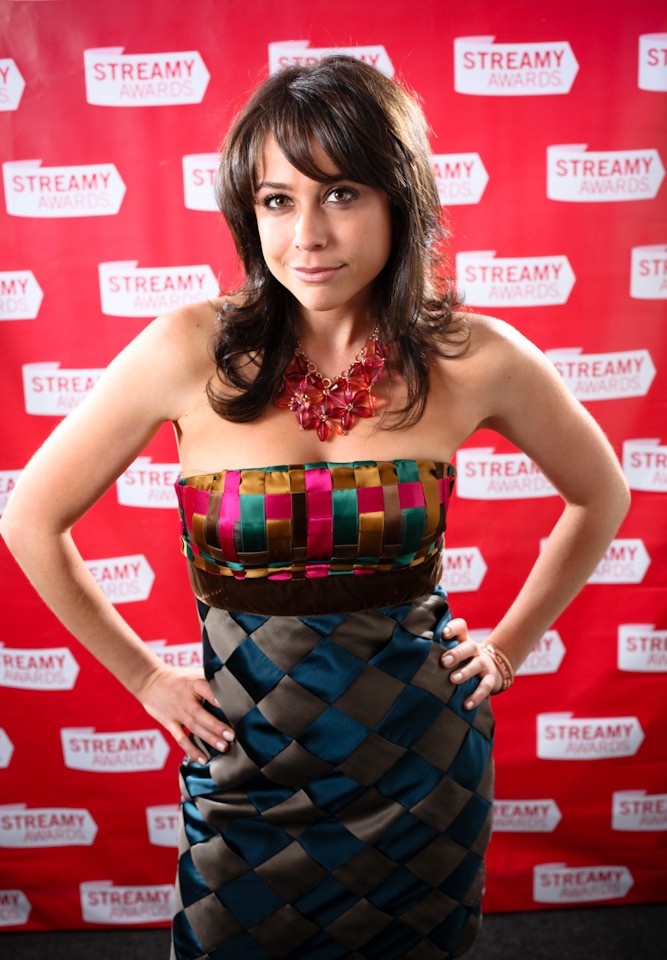
Shira Lazar hosted the Official Red Carpet Pre-Show

The 1st Annual Streamy Awards was the first ever awards ceremony dedicated entirely to web series and the first installment of the Streamy Awards. The awards were held on March 28, 2009, at the Wadsworth Theatre in Los Angeles, California. The event had over 1,300 audience members in attendance and was simultaneously broadcast live online. The Official Red Carpet Pre-Show was hosted by Shira Lazar and the award show was co-hosted by Tubefilter, NewTeeVee and Tilzy.TV. The web series The Guild and Dr. Horrible's Sing-Along Blog were the biggest winners of the night, winning four and six awards, respectively, out of the 25 award categories. The show was met by positive reception by celebrities in attendance and the media.

== Winners and nominees ==
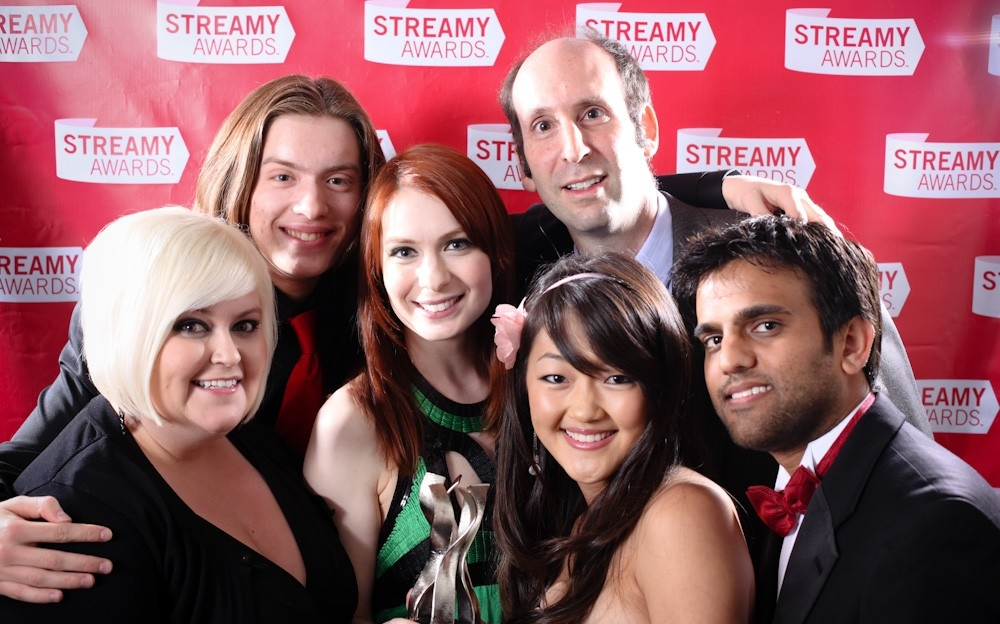
Cast of The Guild, winner of Best Comedy Web Series, Audience Choice Award for Best Web Series, and Best Ensemble Cast in a Web Series

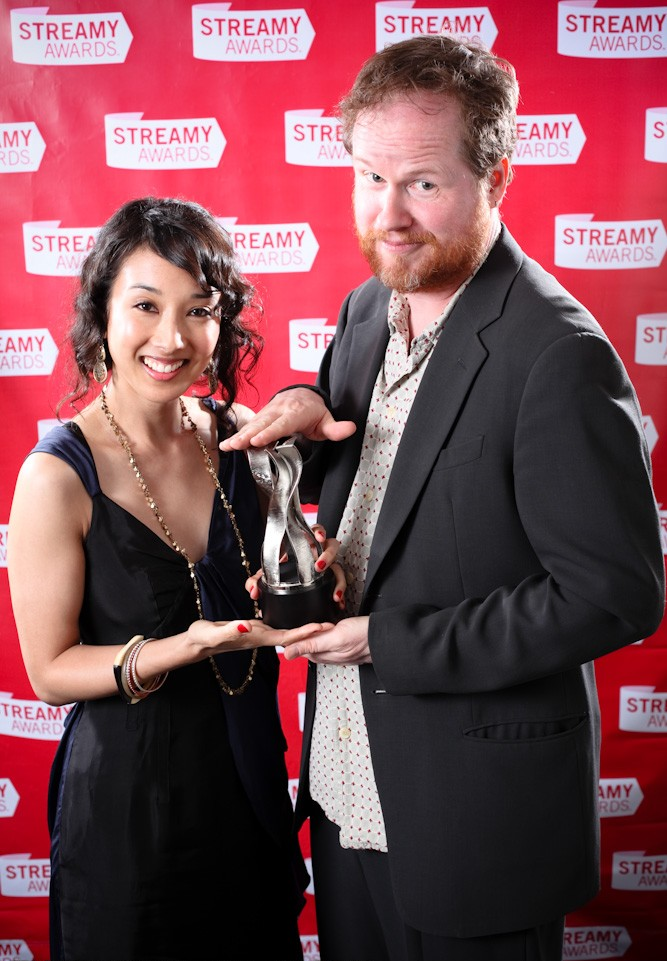
Maurissa Tancharoen and Joss Whedon, winners of Best Writing for a Comedy Web Series

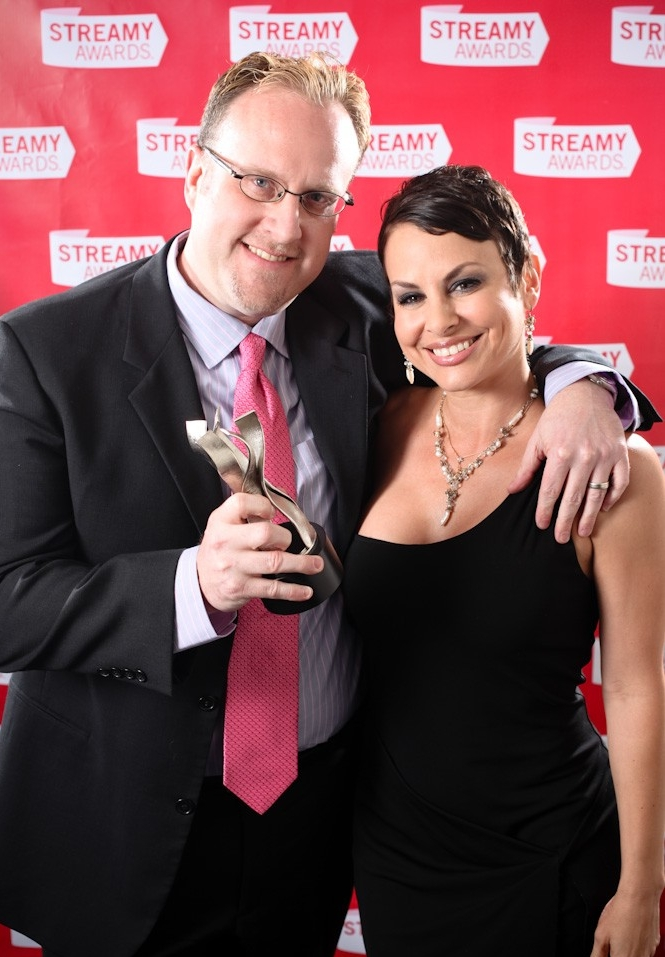
Blake Calhoun, winner of Best Directing for a Dramatic Web Series, with Natalie Raitano

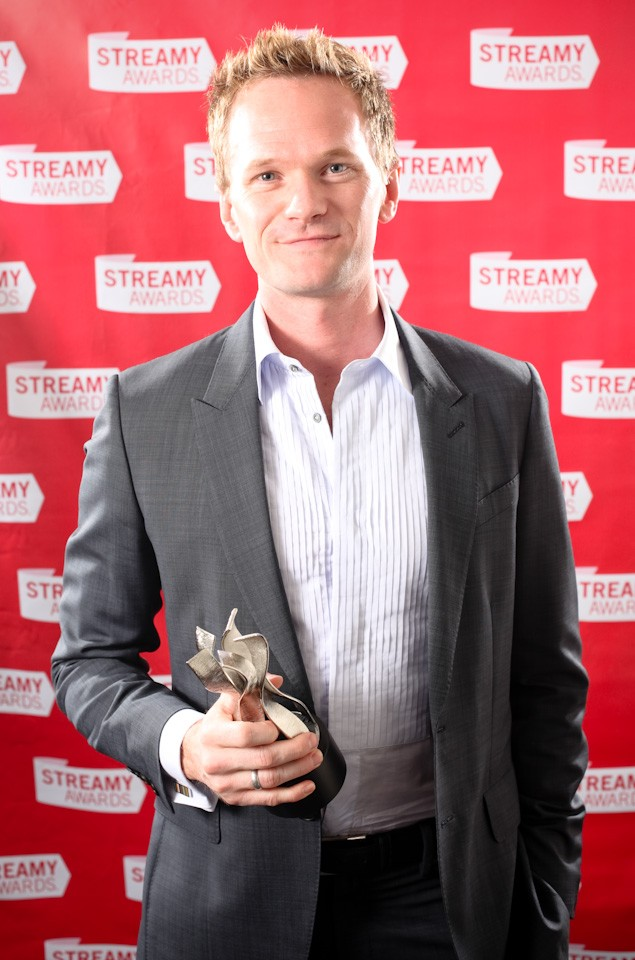
Neil Patrick Harris, winner of Best Male Actor in a Comedy Web Series

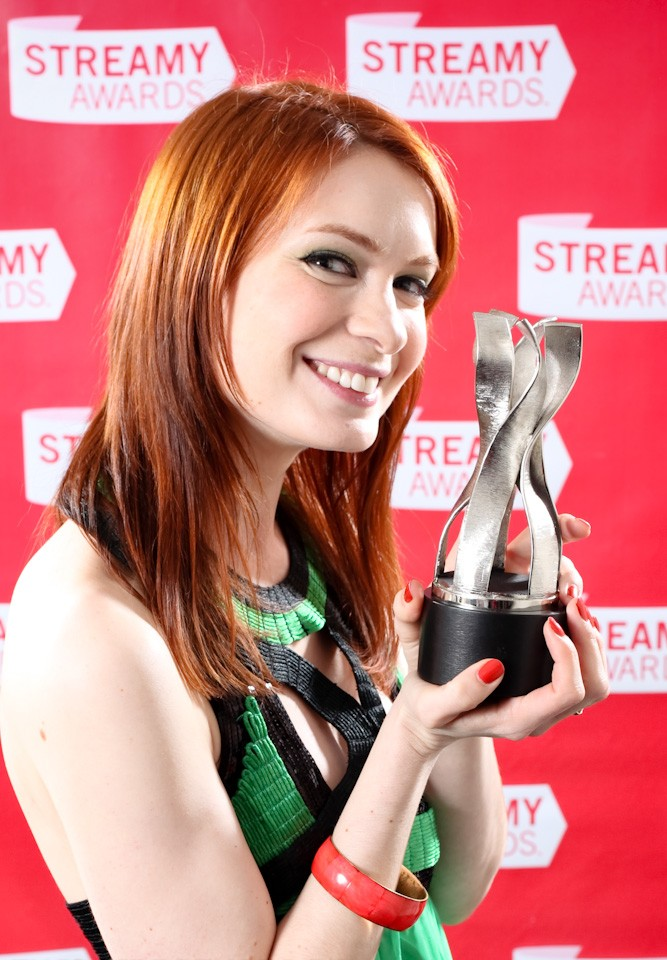
Felicia Day, winner of Best Female Actor in a Comedy Web Series

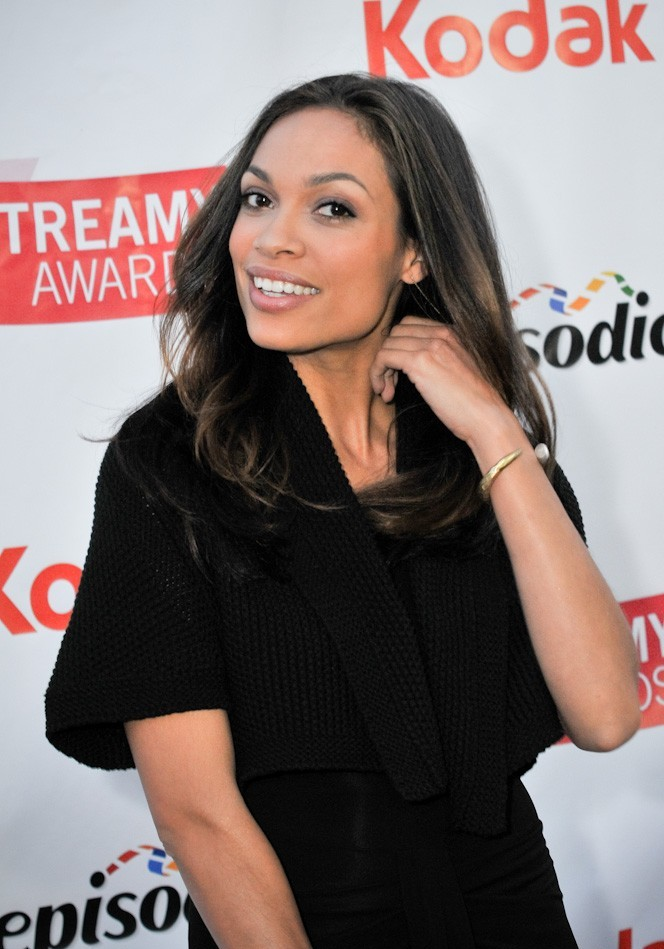
Rosario Dawson, winner of Best Female Actor in a Dramatic Web Series

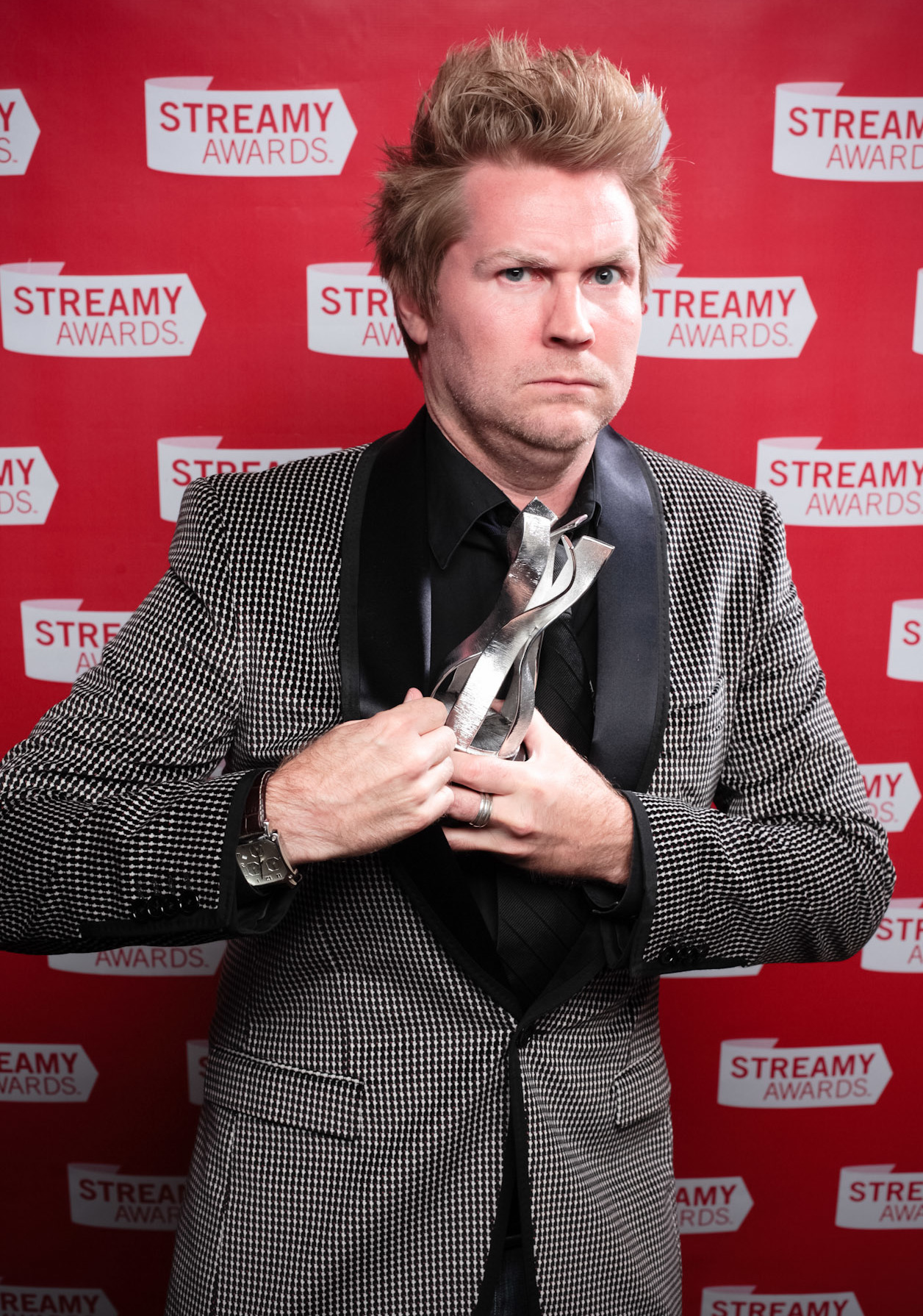
Alex Albrecht, winner of Best Web Series Host

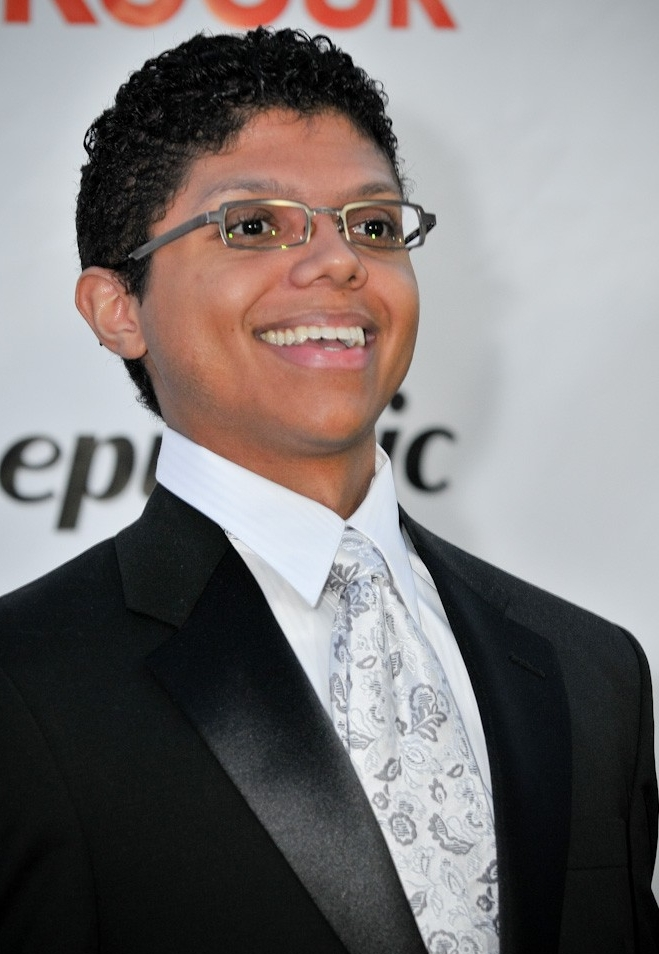
Tay Zonday at the 2009 Streamys

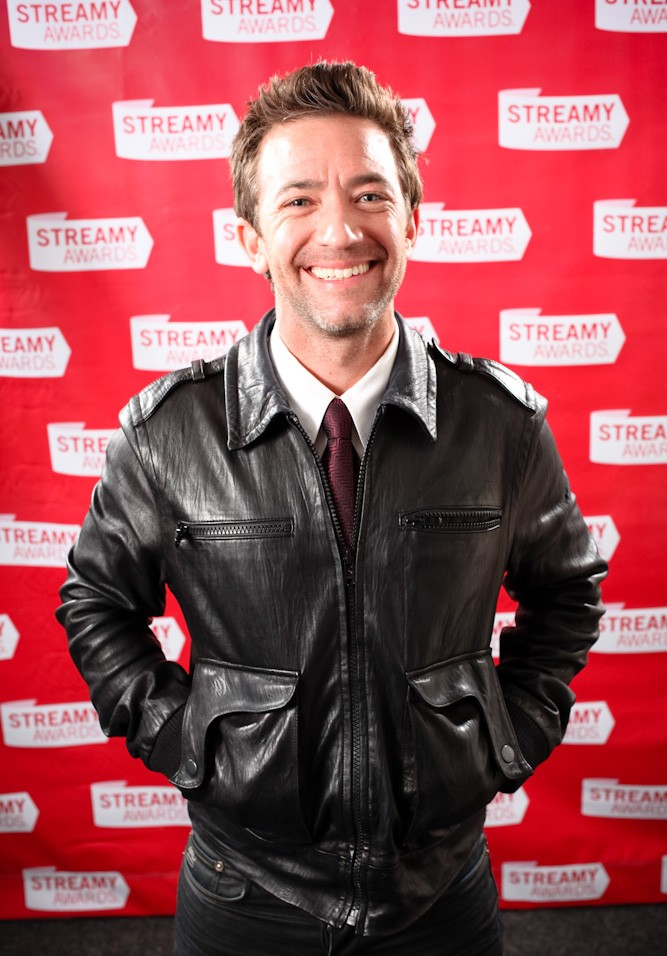
David Faustino at the 2009 Streamys

The nominees were announced on March 13, 2009 and the finalists for the Audience Choice Award for Best Web Series were announced on March 17. The Streamy Craft Award winners were announced in a ceremony held on March 26, 2009. The remaining award categories were announced during the main ceremony at the Wadsworth Theatre on March 28. Winners of the categories were selected by the International Academy of Web Television except for the Audience Choice Award for Best Web Series which was put to a public vote.

Winners are listed first, in bold.

OVERALL
Best Comedy Web Series	Best Dramatic Web Series
**The Guild (MSN Video)**; Childrens Hospital (TheWB.com); Dr. Horrible's Sing-Along Blog; Onion News Network; You Suck at Photoshop	**Battlestar Galactica: The Face of the Enemy (SciFi.com)**; 2009: A True Story; After Judgment; Gemini Division (NBC – SciFi.com); Sorority Forever
Best Hosted Web Series	Best Reality Web Series
**EPIC FU (Revision3)**; Boing Boing TV; Diggnation (Revision3); Project Lore; Wine Library TV	**The Shatner Project**; Amtrekker; Lo-Fi St. Louis; The Mortified Shoebox Show; Penn Says
Best News or Politics Web Series	Audience Choice Award for Best Web Series
**Alive in Baghdad**; MobLogic; Monkey News Source; Rocketboom; Talking Points Memo TV	**The Guild (MSN Video)**; After Judgment; Dorm Life; Dr. Horrible's Sing-Along Blog; The Hayley Project; The Legend of Neil (Atom.com); Project Lore; The Shatner Project; Tiki Bar TV; The Wingmen
DIRECTING
Best Directing for a Comedy Web Series	Best Directing for a Dramatic Web Series
**Joss Whedon for directing Dr. Horrible's Sing-Along Blog**; Casanovas; The Guild; Sandeep Parikh for directing The Legend of Neil; Overkill: A Love Story	**Blake Calhoun for directing Pink**; After Judgment; Heathens; Sorority Forever; With the Angels
WRITING
Best Writing for a Comedy Web Series	Best Writing for a Dramatic Web Series
**Maurissa Tancharoen, Jed Whedon, Joss Whedon, and Zack Whedon for writing Dr. Horrible's Sing-Along Blog**; Break a Leg; Rob Corddry, Jonathan Stern, and David Wain for writing Childrens Hospital; Felicia Day for writing The Guild; You Suck at Photoshop	**Jane Espenson, Seamus Kevin Fahey, and Ronald D. Moore for writing Battlestar Galactica: The Face of the Enemy**; After Judgment; Gemini Division; Sorority Forever; With the Angels
PERFORMANCE
Best Male Actor in a Comedy Web Series	Best Female Actor in a Comedy Web Series
**Neil Patrick Harris – (Dr. Horrible's Sing-Along Blog)**; Amir Blumenfeld – (Jake and Amir); Rob Corddry – (Childrens Hospital); Nathan Fillion – (Dr. Horrible's Sing-Along Blog); Sandeep Parikh – (The Guild)	**Felicia Day – (The Guild)**; Lisa Kudrow – (Web Therapy); Megan Mullally – (Childrens Hospital); Kristen Schaal – (Horrible People); Taryn Southern – (Private High Musicale)
Best Male Actor in a Dramatic Web Series	Best Female Actor in a Dramatic Web Series
**Alessandro Juliani – (Battlestar Galactica: The Face of the Enemy)**; Joel Bryant – (After Judgment); Justin Hartley – (Gemini Division); Seth Mendelson – (Take Me Back); Christopher Stapleton – (30 Days of Night: Dust to Dust)	**Rosario Dawson – (Gemini Division)**; Taryn O'Neill – (After Judgment); Rachel Risen – (The Hayley Project); Jessica Rose – (Sorority Forever); Tara Rushton – (KateModern)
Best Ensemble Cast in a Web Series	Best Guest Star in a Web Series
**The Guild**; All's Faire; Childrens Hospital; Dorm Life; Horrible People	**Paul Rudd – (Wainy Days)**; Fernando Chien – (The Guild); Felicia Day – (The Legend of Neil); Eva Longoria Parker – (Childrens Hospital); Tay Zonday – (Nite Fite)
Best Web Series Host	
**Alex Albrecht – (Project Lore)**; Zadi Diaz – (EPIC FU); Xeni Jardin – (Boing Boing TV); Kevin Rose – (Diggnation); Gary Vaynerchuk – (Wine Library TV)	
CRAFT AWARDS
Best Editing	Best Cinematography
**Lisa Lassek for editing Dr. Horrible's Sing-Along Blog**; Erik Beck for editing Backyard FX; The Guild; Jake and Amir; Tiki Bar TV	**Ryan Green for cinematography in Dr. Horrible's Sing-Along Blog**; The All-for-Nots; Captain Blasto; The Legend of Neil; Pink
Best Art Direction	Best Original Music
**Kim Bailey for art direction in Tiki Bar TV**; Captain Blasto; Dr. Horrible's Sing-Along Blog; Gorgeous Tiny Chicken Machine Show; The Guild	**Jed Whedon for Dr. Horrible's Sing-Along Blog**; The All-For-Nots; All’s Faire; Bear McCreary for Battlestar Galactica: The Face of the Enemy; The Guild
Best Animation	Best Visual Effects
**Dan Meth for animation in The Meth Minute 39**; Happy Tree Friends; Mike Chapman and Matt Chapman for animation in Homestar Runner; Stickman Exodus; Ben "Yahtzee" Croshaw for animation in Zero Punctuation	**Erik Beck for visual effects in Backyard FX**; Dr. Horrible's Sing-Along Blog; The Guild; Kirill; The Pop
Best Ad Integration in a Web Series	Best Artistic Concept in a Web Series
**Back on Topps** – (Skype); The All-for-Nots; Blah Girls; Gemini Division – (Microsoft, Intel, Cisco, UPS); Whatever Hollywood	**You Suck at Photoshop**; Red vs. Blue: Reconstruction; Stephen King’s N; The Ten Commandments; Wreck & Salvage

=== Web series with multiple nominations and awards ===
Web series that received multiple nominations
Nominations	Web Series
12	The Guild
11	Dr. Horrible's Sing-Along Blog
6	After Judgment
6	Childrens Hospital
5	Gemini Division
4	Battlestar Galactica: The Face of the Enemy
4	The Legend of Neil
4	Sorority Forever
3	The All-for-Nots
3	Project Lore
3	Tiki Bar TV
3	You Suck at Photoshop
2	Backyard FX
2	Boing Boing TV
2	Captain Blasto
2	Diggnation
2	Dorm Life
2	EPIC FU
2	The Hayley Project
2	Horrible People
2	Jake and Amir
2	Pink
2	The Shatner Project
2	Wine Library TV
2	With the Angels

Web series that received multiple awards
Awards	Web series
6	Dr. Horrible's Sing-Along Blog
4	The Guild
3	Battlestar Galactica: The Face of the Enemy

== Reception ==
The New York Times Magazine columnist Virginia Heffernan called the show "a goofy and a powerful experience." Heffernan, alongside Alexia Tsotsis writing for LA Weekly, were impressed by the celebrity presence at the show, with Tsotsis calling it "an Emmys for Web TV." Maria Russo, writing for TheWrap, and Patrick Orndorff, writing for Wired, praised the quality of the nominees. Russo opined of the show that although "[in] the big scheme of things it all feels very fledgling", the existence of the awards felt "like a cool glimpse into the future". Heffernan, Tsotsis, and Jill Weinberger of Gigaom, singled out the speeches of Dr. Horrible's Sing-Along Blog writer Joss Whedon and The Guild star Felicia Day as particularly memorable with Whedon praising the online content creators in attendance and Day saying of her awards "this is for everyone who ever said no to me." YouTuber and singer Tay Zonday was enthusiastic about the awards saying that they show "that people don't have to play the system to have their art acknowledged," and actor David Faustino said of the show "we're at a baby stage of something that's going to be amazingly giant and I'm excited to be on ground floor." Brian Lowry writing for Variety called the Streamys the "Worst Award Name Ever".

== See also ==
- List of Streamy Award winners
