= BlackBoxTV =

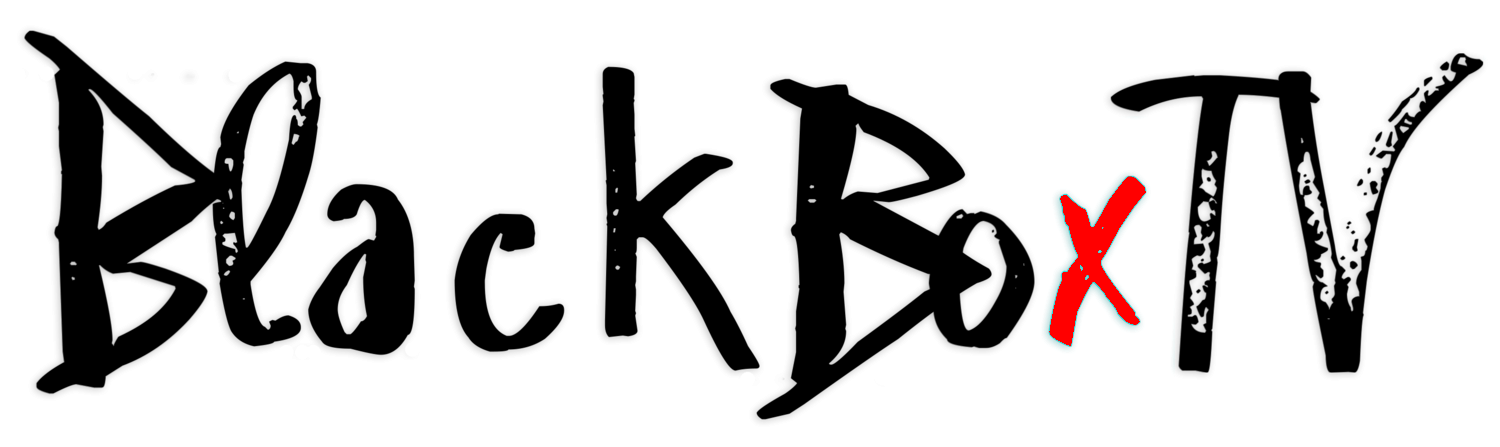

YouTube information
- Channel: BlackBoxTV
- Years active: 2010-present
- Genre: Horror
- Subscribers: 1.13 million
- Views: 224.57 million
- Last updated: 19 December 2025

BlackBoxTV is a commercial YouTube channel and production studio founded by director Tony E. Valenzuela. It was launched on August 17, 2010 and relaunched on April 13, 2012 as part of YouTube's $150 million original channel initiative. The channel, which has collaborated with Wes Craven, Guillermo del Toro and Anthony E. Zuiker, is home to BlackBoxTV Presents, which Variety called "the longest-running scripted drama online" in March 2016.

== History ==
The channel originally launched in August 2010 with one scripted series - BlackBoxTV Presents, a horror anthology featuring a cast of YouTube creators including Philip DeFranco, Justine Ezarik and Shane Dawson.

In October 2011, it was announced that BlackBoxTV was among 100 entities YouTube had partnered with as part of a $150 million investment in television-style programming. The channel relaunched on April 13, 2012, with four new series: Silverwood, Black Friday, True Stories and Anthony E. Zuiker Presents, produced in collaboration with CSI creator Anthony E. Zuiker and Collective Digital Studio.

In 2014, Legendary Entertainment partnered with the channel to produce Versions of Elloise for the “YouTube Space House of Horrors: A Legendary Halloween short film contest.” The film was selected among ten finalists by Guillermo del Toro. Also in 2014, Alpine Labs (formerly Ketchum Labs) partnered with BlackBoxTV to distribute the reality competition series Fight of the Living Dead.

== Programming ==
Year	Title	Featuring	Notes	Status
2010–Present	BlackBoxTV Presents	Bree Essrig; Nikki Limo	Horror anthology series in the vein of The Twilight Zone created by Tony E. Valenzuela.	Current
2012–2013	BlackBoxTV: Silverwood	Brea Grant; Drake Bell	Eleven-part scripted horror anthology series set in the remote mountain town of Silverwood, California.	Concluded
2012-2013	Black Friday	Various	Weekly news magazine hosted by rotating correspondents exploring genre pop culture.	Concluded
2012	True Stories	Jessica Rose	Unscripted reality series focusing on the scary and supernatural, including sleepovers in real haunted houses and exploring frightening places.	Ongoing
2012–2013	Anthony E. Zuiker Presents	Bill Bellamy; Goran Višnjić	Scripted anthology series featuring 10- to 15-minute episodes developed by Anthony E. Zuiker.	Concluded
2013–Present	BlackBoxTV Pranks	Jesse Wellens	Hidden camera series featuring staged pranks and hoaxes based on horror films.	Concluded
2015	The Fourth Door	Joey Graceffa	Twelve-episode scripted supernatural drama series also starring Monique Coleman.	Acquired by go90
2015-2016	Fight of the Living Dead	Meghan Camarena; Iman Crosson	Reality competition series where 10 YouTube creators try to survive a simulated zombie apocalypse.	Acquired by YouTube Red
2015–Present	BlackBoxTV Presents: Horror | 360	Monique Coleman; Lenne Klingaman	Virtual reality anthology featuring fictional characters and urban legends from the world of horror.	Ongoing
2017-2018	Find Me	Madison Lawlor	VR/360 narrative series produced in partnership with Collab and the Los Angeles Times featuring visual codes and puzzles for viewers to solve.	Ongoing

=== 360/Virtual Reality ===
In October, 2015 the channel launched BlackBoxTV Presents: Horror | 360, a virtual reality series for mobile devices and VR headsets. The 11-episode first season included collaborations with Warner Bros. and New Line Cinema. On September 26, 2017 the series won "Best Immersive Series" for excellence in 360 and VR filmmaking at the 2017 Streamy Awards. In September, 2016 Collab announced it had signed a deal with BlackBoxTV to represent the channel and fund two 360 video projects. In 2017, the channel debuted Find Me, a scripted virtual reality series, mobile app and game produced in partnership with Collab and the Los Angeles Times.

=== Audio Series ===
In 2018, Serial Box acquired the rights to produce Silverwood: The Door, a scripted audio series and eBook that will expand the BlackBoxTV: Silverwood universe.
