= Tony E. Valenzuela =

American filmmaker (born 1972)

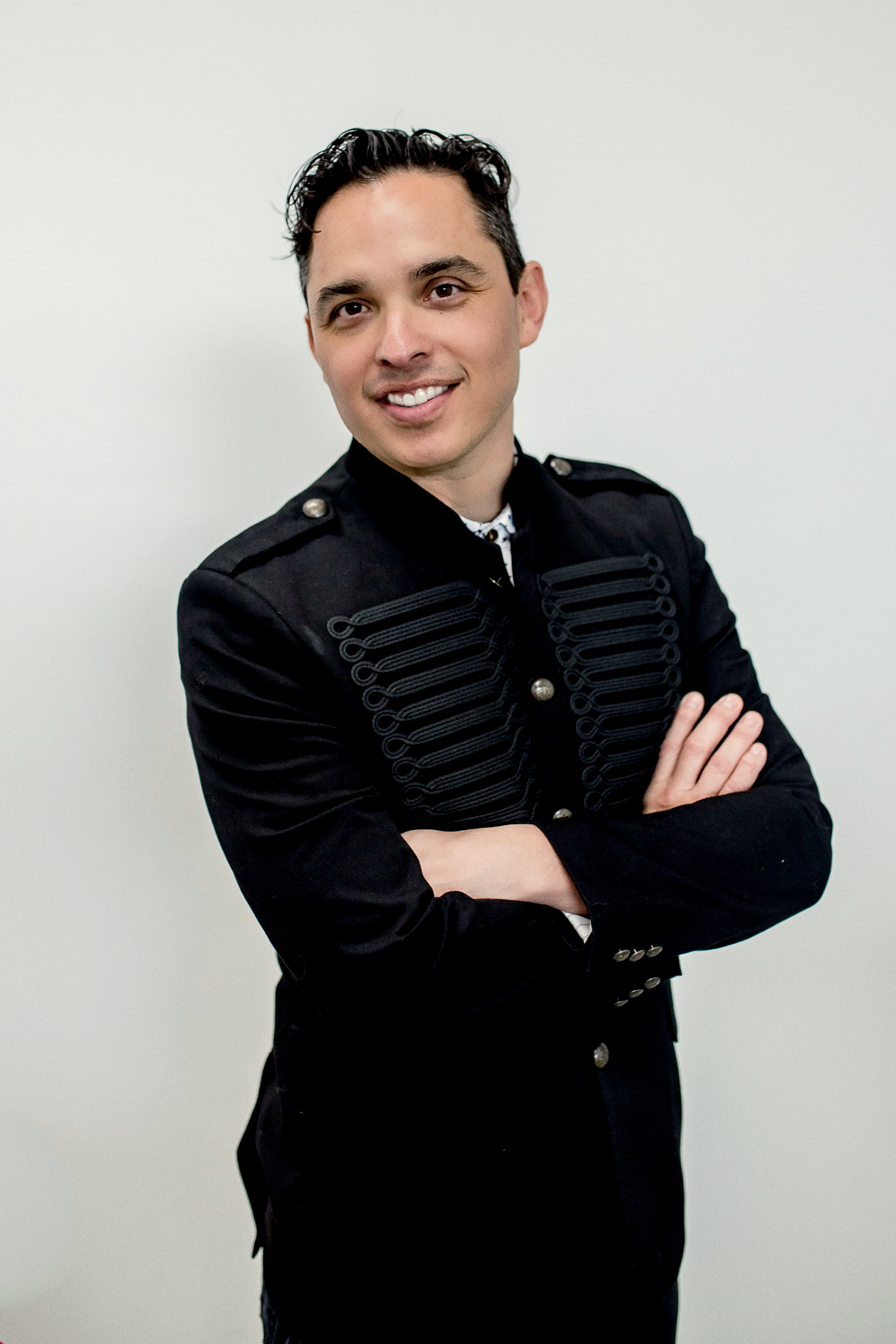
- Born: June 3, 1972 (age 54); Fontana, California, U.S.
- Occupations: Director; producer; writer
- Years active: 2008 - present
- Children: 1
- Website: blackboxtv.com

Tony Edvard Valenzuela (born June 3, 1972) is an American director, producer and writer widely known for creating BlackBoxTV, a YouTube channel dedicated to short horror films and series. He also directed The Axe Murders of Villisca (2017), for IFC and Fight of the Living Dead.

== Career ==
In 2008, Valenzuela wrote and directed 2009: A True Story, a thirteen-episode dystopian web series that was nominated for Best Dramatic Web Series at the first-annual Streamy Awards and was featured by director Wes Craven during his Halloween 2008 YouTube Takeover. In 2009, Valenzuela directed Harper's Globe, a thirteen-episode web series companion to the CBS television drama, Harper's Island and the mixed reality series Green Eyed World for Sprite, which won the Webby Award for Best Use of Social Media in 2010.

Valenzuela is the creator of BlackBoxTV Presents, a horror anthology series that debuted on YouTube on August 17, 2010 and is the longest-running online drama, according to Variety. The first season, which featured a cast of YouTube creators including Philip DeFranco, iJustine and Shane Dawson, was financed by Valenzuela. In 2012, Valenzuela created, co-produced and directed Silverwood and collaborated with CSI creator Anthony E. Zuiker to create Anthony E. Zuiker Presents as part of Google's YouTube Original Channel Initiative. For BlackBoxTV Presents, Valenzuela has won Streamy Awards for Best Writing: Drama and Best Drama Series.

In 2014, Valenzuela directed and co-wrote Versions of Elloise in collaboration with Legendary Entertainment as part of “YouTube Space House of Horrors: A Legendary Halloween” and was selected as one of ten finalists by Guillermo del Toro.

In 2015, Valenzuela directed the pilot episode of the reality competition Fight of the Living Dead, which he executive produced and distributed through BlackBoxTV from 2015-2016 for YouTube Red. Also in 2015, Valenzuela was recruited by New Form - the digital studio co-founded by Ron Howard and Brian Grazer, to create, write and direct The Fourth Door, a supernatural good versus evil drama series starring Joey Graceffa and Monique Coleman from High School Musical. The Fourth Door debuted on October 27, 2015 on go90 and received honors at Marseille Web Fest and Raindance Film Festival. Beginning in 2016, Valenzuela directed nine episodes of the virtual reality series BlackBoxTV Presents: 360\Horror and won the Best Immersive Storyteller Streamy Award in 2017 for excellence in VR and 360 filmmaking.

Valenzuela's feature-length directorial debut, The Axe Murders of Villisca premiered at the LA Film Festival on June 7, 2016. In his December 7, 2016 review, Austin Chronicle critic Richard Whittaker wrote, "Villisca has heart and horror, creating an elegant melding of teen angst and supernatural horror that is as much The Breakfast Club as Sometimes They Come Back.”
