= 2009: A True Story =

- Genre: Post-apocalyptic
- Created by: Tony E. Valenzuela
- Written by: Tony E. Valenzuela, Jeffrey Hunt
- Directed by: Tony E. Valenzuela
- Creative director: Alex Desharnais
- Music by: Miles Tilmann, Mark DeNardo, SPC ECO, Dean Garcia, Nine Inch Nails
- No. of episodes: 13

Production
- Producers: Jason Bernstein, Jeffrey Hunt, Tony E. Valenzuela
- Cinematography: Jeffrey Hunt
- Editor: Tony E. Valenzuela

2009: A True Story is a 13-part dystopian web series by Tony E. Valenzuela released in 2008.

== Premise ==
After an attack destroying three American cities, the United States government declares martial law and establishes authoritarian control over its citizens. Sarah Ford (Kate Maloney) is a teenage girl vlogger who is looking for her brother. She travels from Los Angeles, across the Mojave desert, to California where her brother is stationed. Her brother, Adam Ford (Cody Harnish), is a soldier searching for two army deserters.

== Production and release ==
2009: A True Story is the first web series by Tony E. Valenzuela. The series was written by Valenzuela and Jeffrey Hunt during the 2007–08 Writers Guild of America strike. It was produced by an independent crew and cast without major studio funding under Valenzuela's own production company, Strange Radio Productions. It had a total budget of approximately $20,000.

The story is primarily shown via Sarah's vlogs and body cam footage from Adam's helmet, although other footage is also included to give a broader view of the story. Footage was filmed on a DVX camcorder and edited to add pixelation and artefacts to create a "junked up" look. This style of photography and minimalist sets helped to keep the budget for the film low. The score is primarily electronic music, with blips and audio distortions feeding into a dystopian cyberpunk atmosphere. Matt Sigloch and Jon Barton from The Gun Metal Group acted as consultants on the accuracy of the series' depiction of the military.

Critics identified influences as coming from low-budget found footage films like The Blair Witch Project, internet vlogging as a medium, and other web series such as lonelygirl15. In addition to the web series, elements of the story were told through the series' website (including Sarah's diary and fictional newspaper clippings) and MySpace page.

The first episode was released on April 11, 2008, and gained over 1.7 million views by August of the same year. The thirteenth episode released on July 22, 2008.

== Reception ==
According to Michael Moran from The Times, 2009: A True Story polarized audiences with some viewing it as pretentious. Moran felt that the series was ambitious and that its quality was comparable to that of a web series created by a big television studio, with professional-quality production and a "slick" website. He also characterized it as "an artistic act of love" due to the lack of advertisements on its website or its YouTube channel home page. The Romanian edition of Level magazine gave a positive review, also praising the quality of the production, which it said bordered on the scale of a non-indie, commercial production. It praised the political themes, convincing military uniforms and equipment, and the atmospheric score. The reviewer enjoyed the acting, noting that it was uneven due to the amateur actors but enjoyable and sincere. A review in Gizmodo called 2009: A True Story "webseries gold".

In a more negative appraisal, Michael Joshua Rowin for Tubefilter said the series was full of filler, that its "found footage" filming style was a gimmick to hide the lack of a substantive plot, and that its ending was anti-climactic. He summarized it as "empty political commentary for the emo generation" with "one-dimensional mouthpieces enacting a parade of clichés".

The series was nominated for "Best Dramatic Web Series" at the 1st Streamy Awards.
