= BlackBoxTV Presents =

American horror anthology series

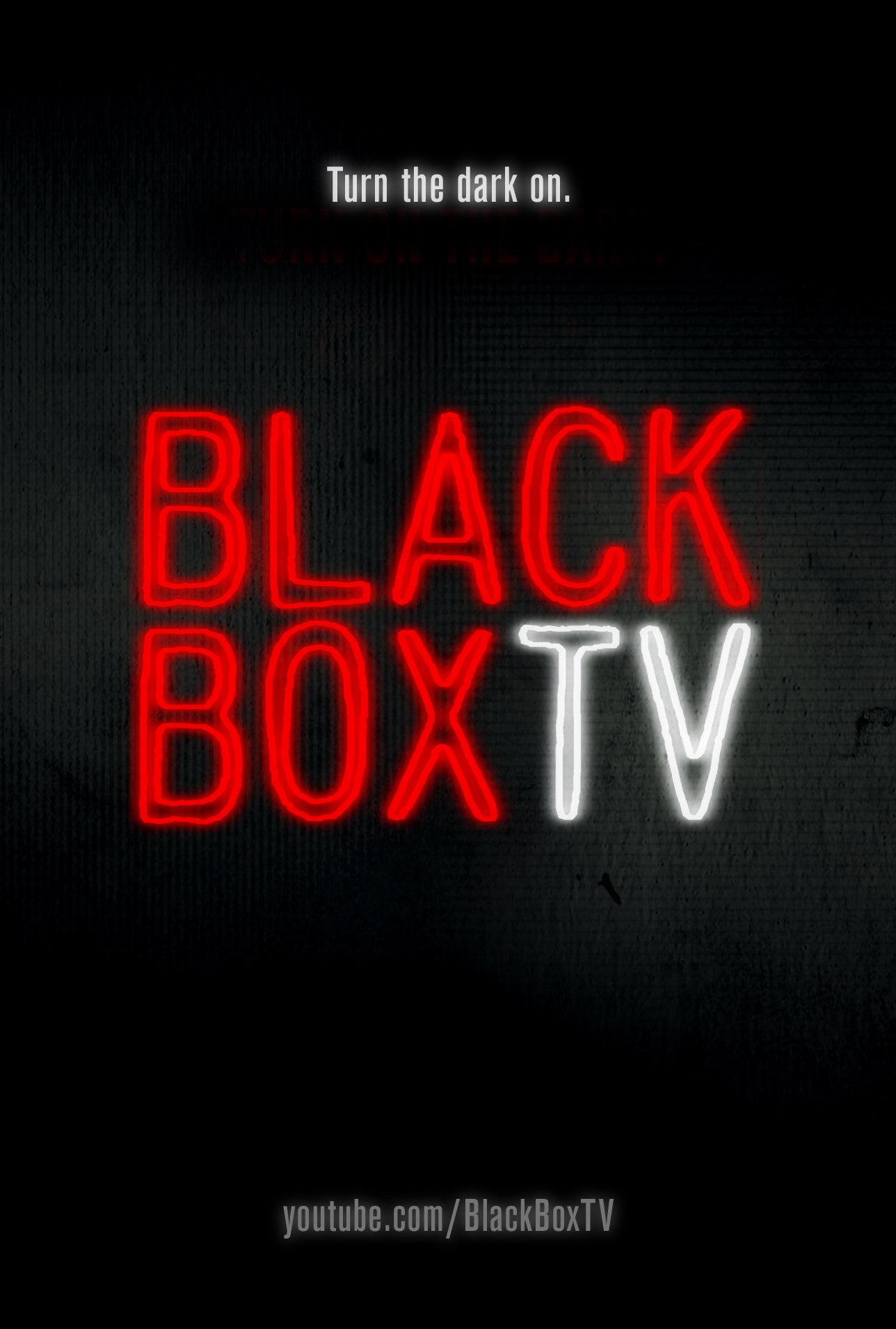
- Genre: Drama; Horror; Science fiction
- Created by: Tony E. Valenzuela; Philip DeFranco
- Written by: Tony E. Valenzuela; Michael J. Gallagher; Brett Annese; Bernie Su
- Directed by: Tony E. Valenzuela
- Starring: Joey Graceffa; Bree Essrig; Wilson Cleveland; Brittani Louise Taylor; Taryn Southern; Jeremy Sisto; Brea Grant; Drake Bell; Jarrett Sleeper; Vincent Cyr; Nikki Limo; Philip DeFranco; Justine Ezarik; Shane Dawson
- Narrated by: Tony E. Valenzuela
- Country of origin: United States
- Original language: English
- No. of seasons: 5
- No. of episodes: 61

Production
- Executive producers: Tony E. Valenzuela; Anthony E. Zuiker; Gary Bryman
- Camera setup: Single-camera
- Running time: 15-22 minutes

Original release
- Network: YouTube
- Release: August 17, 2010

BlackBoxTV Presents is an American horror anthology web series created by Tony E. Valenzuela and Philip DeFranco. The first season, which featured a cast of YouTube creators including DeFranco, iJustine, and Shane Dawson, was self-funded by Valenzuela and debuted on the BlackBoxTV YouTube channel on August 17, 2010.

In 2012, Valenzuela collaborated with CSI creator Anthony E. Zuiker to relaunch the BlackBoxTV YouTube channel as part of the YouTube Original Channel Initiative. Season three, dubbed BlackBoxTV: Silverwood, premiered on the relaunched BlackBoxTV YouTube channel on April 13, 2012.

The season 5 premiere episode, "How to Quit YouTube" starring Wilson Cleveland as a vlogger lost in the desert, debuted on YouTube on March 19, 2014. The episode, which Tubefilter writer Sam Gutelle called, "an extreme version of the occasionally overwhelming demands of online video fame," earned Streamy Award nominations for Cleveland for Best Actor and Valenzuela for Best Director in 2014. The season 5 episode "Versions of Elloise" was produced in collaboration with Legendary Entertainment as part of “YouTube Space House of Horrors: A Legendary Halloween” and selected as one of ten finalists by Guillermo del Toro.

BlackBoxTV Presents has won Streamy Awards for Best Writing: Drama (2013), Best Drama Series (2015) and Best Immersive Series (2017) and won Best Editing at the 2012 IAWTV Awards.
