= The Axe Murders of Villisca =

- Directed by: Tony E. Valenzuela
- Written by: Owen Egerton
- Produced by: Seth Caplan; Michael Wormser
- Starring: Robert Adamson; Jarrett Sleeper; Alex Frnka; Sean Whalen; Conchata Ferrell; Riley Bodenstab; Kellan Rhude; Jon Gries
- Cinematography: Jeffrey Waldron
- Edited by: Tony E. Valenzuela
- Music by: Brandon Roberts
- Production company: Ketchum Labs
- Distributed by: IFC Midnight
- Release dates: 7 June 2016 (Los Angeles Film Festival); 20 January 2017 (US)
- Running time: 71 minutes
- Country: United States
- Language: English

The Axe Murders of Villisca is a 2016 American horror film directed by Tony E. Valenzuela, starring Robert Adamson, Jarrett Sleeper, Alex Frnka, Sean Whalen, Conchata Ferrell, Riley Bodenstab, Kellan Rhude and Jon Gries.

== Cast ==
- Robert Adamson as Caleb Hirsche
- Jarrett Sleeper as Denny Shea
- Alex Frnka as Jesse
- Sean Whalen as Reverend Kelly
- Conchata Ferrell as Mrs. Flanks
- Riley Bodenstab as Connor
- Kellan Rhude as Rob
- Jon Gries as Greg
- Madison Lawlor as Lena
- Ava Kolker as Ina
- Brett Rickaby as Caleb's father
- Urs Inauen as Matt
- Savannah Stehlin as Elsie Holloway
- Sophia Linkletter as Priscilla Conolly
- Joey Graceffa as Most Haunted Host
- Rachel Winfree as Margaret
- Bree Essrig as Paranormal Investigator
- Elsie Fisher as Ina (voice)

== Release ==
The film premiered at the Los Angeles Film Festival on 7 June 2016.

== Reception ==
Noel Murray of the Los Angeles Times wrote that the film "never really comes to much, perhaps because its focus is too diffuse. The scares are low, and the plot under-baked."

Frank Scheck of The Hollywood Reporter wrote, "Disjointed and confusing, the film fails to live up to the promise of its spooky setting."

Damond Fudge of KCCI called the film "jumbled mess that leaves a lot of unanswered questions".
