= The Wingmen =

The Wingmen logo

The Wingmen is a mockumentary web-series created by the Lark the Beard Comedy Troupe. It tells the story of a group of young men and the rising popularity of their radio talk show. After an unfortunate turn of events leads to the cancellation of their show, they are forced to start up a shifty dating service to pay off their FCC fine.

The premise of the show was inspired by real events after the Lark the Beard troupe was kicked off of their comedy radio program "We is Radio" at KVRX 91.7 FM in Austin, Texas.

The show was honored in the 2008 South by Southwest Greenlight Awards which featured the best up and coming web-series of the year. The Wingmen were also "Best Comedy" finalists in the 2008 and 2009 CBI competition and received an Audience Choice Nomination in the 2009 Streamy Awards by the International Academy of Web Television.

Besides the official website the show can also be seen on KVR-TV in Austin, Texas.
