= Gemini Division =

- The title card of the show
- Genre: Drama; Science fiction Mystery
- Created by: Brent V. Friedman
- Developed by: Brent V. Friedman; Jeff Sagansky; Rosario Dawson; Stan Rogow
- Directed by: Stan Rogow
- Starring: see below
- Narrated by: Rosario Dawson
- Country of origin: United States
- Original language: English
- No. of seasons: 1
- No. of episodes: 50

Production
- Executive producers: Brent V. Friedman; Jeff Sagansky; Rosario Dawson; Stan Rogow
- Producers: John Alexander Reed; Andrew Black; Alissa Diaz; Leslie Harro
- Cinematography: David Klein; Robert Seaman
- Editors: Pete Evans; Stephen Evans; Bryan Irving; Tyler Trautman
- Running time: approx. 7 minutes per episode

Original release
- Network: NBC; Sci Fi
- Release: August 18, 2008

Related
- Afterworld

Gemini Division is an American science fiction web series consisting of five- to seven-minute episodes. Created by Electric Farm Entertainment, it went into production in March 2008. Based on an original story by Brent Friedman the online series was developed by Joshua Stern. The show currently airs on NBC.com as part of their online content lineup. The series began August 18, 2008. The series stars Rosario Dawson, who worked with Electric Farm Entertainment on the Webby nominated cult internet series Afterworld. J Alex Reed and Duane Loose will be showrunners, while Brent Friedman and Stan Rowgow serve as executive producers. The writing staff includes Brent Friedman, Andy Black, Lawrence Frank, and Jacqui Zambrano. Stan Rogow is also credited as Director and is presumed to direct a number of the episodes with the rest being directed by Neal Israel. Web content development is being managed by producers Ben Raab and Deric Hugues web content producers.

== Production ==
=== Plot ===
Gemini Division is about an NYC detective investigating the murder of her fiance that suddenly appears to be not as it seems. During the ensuing investigation she uncovers a global conspiracy involving the creation of simulated life forms known as "SiMS" that have assimilated themselves within the unsuspecting public and a mysterious clandestine organization called Gemini Division that is created to take them down. It is often criticized given that the narrative is weak and watered down to maximise air time to 'load' adverts to the audience.

=== Premise ===
Gemini Division features undercover Detective Anna Diaz (Rosario Dawson), a street wise and tough-as-nails NYPD cop forced to live dual lives. Diaz’s deep undercover persona drives her to keep people at a distance as a blown cover would mean death.

Enter Nick Korda (Justin Hartley): After secreting herself away for so long, Diaz sees Korda as almost too good to be true. Anna finds a security in Nick she didn’t believe possible, allowing her to lower her defenses and be herself. Though she has questions about Nick’s life, after only a few months the couple travels to romantic Paris and get engaged. But before her questions and his proposal are answered, Nick is murdered. Diaz vows to bring his murderers to justice and in doing so discovers the truth about Korda and a vast global conspiracy.

=== Genesis ===
Electric Farm Entertainment executives Brent Friedman, Stan Rogow, and Jeff Sagansky reviewed lessons learned from the series Afterworld and scrapped the originally planned 130 episode season for a more realistic 50 episode run. Stepping away from the combination of computer graphics and rotoscoped animation prevalent in the Afterworld series, Gemini Division will focus on live action with computer generated backgrounds. Gemini Division is also leveraging non-traditional broadcasting to bring further integration between the web and mainstream media outlets with the new business model being supported by mobile games, alternate reality websites, character blogs and other non-disclosed forms of digital and interactive content.

=== Format ===
Fifty internet episodes, between five and seven minutes in length, displayed in Flash Video Format. The episodes are made to appear as a video message conversation between Diaz and the viewer via Anna's PDA device, with flashbacks every so often to explain parts of the story, with the viewer as the "receiver" of Diaz's call, or in certain cases the viewer acts as a somewhat unseen observer of interactions between Diaz and anyone else she calls. Once Diaz joins Gemini Division, the viewer is kept in the loop via a specially created connection that acts like a 'dead zone' to prevent Gemini from tracing the call, but can also monitor any calls that Anna makes to Gemini. (i.e., first-person view). All calls so far in the series are from Diaz to the "friend", except in one of the first episodes when Nick Korda calls the friend.

Additionally, subscribers to Verizon FIOS TV and Comcast digital cable are able to see the series via NBC's section of the ON DEMAND service the company provides. The episodes are bundled by week and are set into the service every Friday.

=== Product placement ===
Instead of using pre-roll or interstitial advertising, Electric Farm Entertainment chose to monetize Gemini Division through prominent product placement within the show itself. In a 2009 interview executive producer Stan Rogow stated:

[Gemini Division] has [a] different model. They are using product integration with 5 different brands that are very organic. Microsoft, Intel, Cisco, UPS. They talked to the brands to find what was really cool about their stuff. They then could integrate the product features into the show. The show starts with Rosario talking into the PDA, they had her talking into the Windows Mobile software. They created a new interface which was not the traditional Windows Mobile interface. Microsoft let them go ahead and it got really good reviews. Now waiting to see what Microsoft does with the interface. They have not done pre-rolls – but they are open to experimenting. They believe there is more value in product integration, but traditional media buyers still want the things they know.

== Casting ==
Robin Lippin and Claire Benjamin, who previously worked with Electric Farm Entertainment on Afterworld (Sci-Fi Show), are the show's casting directors.

=== Cast ===
Character Name	Talent
Det. Anna Diaz	Rosario Dawson
Nick Korda	Justin Hartley
Amasso	Kevin Alejandro
Walken	Tony Curran
M+M	Allison Scagliotti
Det. Pete Vacarella	Matt Bushell
The Cleaner	Daz Crawford
Dr. Elizabeth Gavillan	Elizabeth Bogush
Dr. Martin Ng	François Chau
UPS Delivery Man	David Jung
Sal Diaz	Mark Espinoza
SIM #1	Tug Coker
Agent A	Timothy V. Murphy
Agent B	Sandra Thigpen
Bobby Tedesco	Danny Woodburn
Front Desk Clerk	Charles Fathy
Brescia	John Kapelos
Nadia	Elena Satine
Sampson	Clayne Crawford
Suleiman	Rick Ravanello
Agent C	James MacDonald
Cpl. Ryder	Raphael Sbarge
Col. Black	Peter Jason
Abayomi	Ransford Doherty
Hans Dresner	Norbert Weisser
Richard Kelso	Austin Tichenor
Lead Scientist	David Berman
Dr. Laszlo	Eugene Alper
Dr. Bauer	Leonard Thomas

== Awards/nominations ==
Streamy Awards:

- Streamy Award for Best Dramatic Web Series (2009) (nomination)
