= You Suck at Photoshop =

- Also known as: YSAP
- Genre: comedy, tutorial
- Created by: Matt Bledsoe, Troy Hitch
- Starring: Troy Hitch
- Voices of: Troy Hitch as Donnie Hoyle; Matt Bledsoe as Sn4tchbuckl3r
- Country of origin: United States
- Original language: English

Production
- Running time: usually 3–6 minutes per episode

Original release
- Release: 21 December 2007 – 31 October 2008

You Suck at Photoshop is a series of online Photoshop tutorials with adult-themed humor designed by Matt Bledsoe and Troy Hitch of the Big Fat Institute for Advanced Interactive Design; hosted at My Damn Channel. The show started as a one-off parody of instructional videos and became popular almost overnight; since its debut in December 2007, the first episode alone has received over 4.7 million views on YouTube, over 600,000 on My Damn Channel, and garnered national attention in Time Magazine.

== Show format and subject matter ==
Episodes typically star fictional Photoshop user Donnie Hoyle, who demonstrates tools and techniques in Photoshop, usually on a Macintosh computer. Donnie is a person with severe and chronic personal problems relating to his job, his relationships and disintegrating marriage; various legal problems, career and emotional problems; which tend to weave themselves into the narrative to dark comedic effect. Each episode's title card is further distinguished by a different misspelling which can be interpreted as part of the joke of each episode or is spelled so as to suggest an off-color reference. Further clues to Donnie's state of mind can probably be inferred from the ever-changing desktop wallpaper seen during the demonstration.

Despite Donnie's rather intractable life problems, he does manage to demonstrate Photoshop CS3 tools and techniques, such as selecting via Color Range, Curves, and Vanishing Point.

Originally intended as a one-off series, YSAP went into a second season due to fan demand.

The series went into its second season on My Damn Channel on 27 June 2008, and ended on 31 October 2008. The series has had two spinoffs, a five-episode My Damn Channel series known as Sn4tchbuckl3r's Second Chance, and You Suck At Photoshop (TOP SECRET EDITION!), in which Donnie creates his Photoshop will.

The series restarted unofficially on 4 April 2012 with a spinoff called You Rock At Photoshop, starring Ronnie Cox. On 25 April 2012, the official start of You Suck At Photoshop started.

== Awards ==
The series was awarded two Webby awards; for Best How-To and Best Comedy Series – People's Voice. It also won the Streamy award for Best Artistic Concept in a Web Series.

== Characters ==
- Donnie Hoyle (voiced by Troy Hitch) is the series' main character, tutor, and victim. Starting the series as an unhappily married man, desperately unhappy in his job as dumping manager of a waste-management company called Phebco, he relieves stress by making video tutorials of an application he is a master of – Adobe Photoshop CS3. He is so angry, though, that he cannot help but let his discontent over his strife-laden marriage, lack of accomplishment and contempt toward other people who don't know Photoshop as well show through. He suffers from self-hatred and bottled up emotions, which he tries to remedy by making tutorials. He's fighting a losing battle against his lifestyle and typically takes it out on the viewer through scornful comments and sarcasm. His friends betray him, and many plan to kill him, such as Sandy and Sn4tchbuckl3r. At the end of the second-season finale, Donnie is apparently shot by an unknown assailant.

The creators of the character have this to say about him, from their Time magazine profile:

Hitch and Bledsoe had long nurtured an idea for a character they thought of as the Angry Photoshop Guy. Explains Bledsoe: "We had both been in the agency business so long that after a while we'd seen every kind of person in the advertising world." One of those stereotypes, he says, was the "insane designer, basically. He has horrible social skills and horrible things going on in his life, and the only thing he has going for him is he can out-Photoshop the guy in the cube next to him

- Sn4tchbuckl3r (voiced by Matt Bledsoe) is the series' major recurring supporting character, and appears to be Donnie's closest friend and a regular co-player of World of Warcraft. He speaks with what appears to be a Hispanic accent, and both taunts Donnie and seems to also function as his only friendly contact with the world at large. His speech is characterized by what would otherwise be expletives that are cleverly replaced by similarly sounding words (e.g. What the Schmidt!)
- Sandy Mehglich (unvoiced) is Donnie's internet divorce-rebound love-interest, the next most important recurring character. She is a prominent plot feature in episodes 7, 8, and 9 from the first season, and 16 from the second. She was introduced to Donnie through a request to "hot-up" her Facebook picture to appeal to, as she put it, "college-boy beef loaf". Sandy is also encumbered by two adult children who were, through apparently some sort of prolonged physical abuse involving coffee and special restrictive unitards, stunted to about 65% of normal growth and attempt to make a living as semi-professional go-cart drivers, whom Sandy, out of necessity, manages. In contrast to the other characters who are known only by their voices, Sandy is only known by her (rather flawed) face, a Facebook message to Donnie and her Facebook chat session (where she was in an adjoining room) while Donnie was demonstrating brush settings in episode 16.

Additional uncredited characters include Donnie's wife (usually heard heckling him in the early episodes), and Donnie's co-workers at Phebco (heard when he had to do a couple of tutorials from his workplace after legal trouble during his divorce caused him to be locked out of his house).

== Episode guide ==
=== Season One ===
Season One of You Suck at Photoshop was presented on My Damn Channel every other week from 21 December 2007 through 4 April 2008. It comprises 10 regular episodes and one season-ending tribute episode. Donnie's life and career trajectory during this series begin with his portrayal as a man who is both desperately unhappy in his job and his marriage, the progress of his life through his divorce and the loss of his job (whether by firing or quitting is not made clear), and his failed attempt to forge another relationship prior to his rather mysterious disappearance at the end of episode 10.

- Episode One – You Suck at Photoshop: Distort, Warp and Layer Effects: Donnie uses distort and warp to paste a copy of his marriage license over the driver's side of the van in which his wife was conducting a certain infidelity. Layer effects are used to blend the license graphic so that it looks pasted on. Released 21 December 2007.
- Episode Two – You Suck at Photoshop: Covering Your Mistakes: Donnie demonstrates how to cover areas with cutting, pasting, and overlaying color, then making it look realistic with the eraser tool, demonstrating on a picture of a cat his wife rescued and now insists he care for over the weekend while she's on a business trip. Sn4tchbuckl3r appears to taunt him. Released 9 January 2008.
- Episode Three: You Suck at Photardshop: Clone Stamp and Manual Cloning: Donnie demonstrates two ways to cover up the ring on his wife's finger, Clone Stamp and manual cloning – a technique where similar nearby areas are cut and pasted and then blended in. Released 18 January 2008.
- Episode Four – You Suck it Photoshop: Paths and Masks: Donnie demonstrates how to use paths to create clipping masks to simplify putting an imported graphic on a background. Released 25 January 2008.
- Episode Five – You Suck at Photoshops: Select Color Range: Donnie is looking forward to a vacation after "accidentally Pricelining a three-connection flight to a discount Mexican beach", and uses Select > Color Range to lift a complex object – a hammock – out of a background so that he can place it on a tropical beach graphic. His plans go for naught, however, when his supervisor informs him that he'll have to cancel his "little-man discovery trip" to go on a business trip. Misery ensues. This episode is recorded at Donnie's workplace because of apparent legal troubles over his house. Released 1 February 2008.
- Episode Six – You Sick at Photoshop – Filter-Liquefy: Returning from his business trip, Donnie is trapped at the airport for a 96-hour layover because his boss misbooked the return. Sadly for Donnie, he is shy of public restrooms, though toward the end of the episode, Sn4tchbuckler can be heard Skyping in to encourage him to "see what Brown can do" for him. The liquefy tool is demonstrated, showing how one might gradually distort an object to enlarge it. Not for the squeamish. Released 15 February 2008.
- Episode Seven – Yo Suck At Photoshop: Patch Tool and Levels: A Donnie fan, only known as Sandy, sends Donnie her Facebook picture to "hot up", as she too has been in a divorce and needs to be "hip deep in College-boy beef loaf ASAP". Donnie demonstrates how one might use the Patch tool to fix areas and attempts to use the Levels tool to obscure Sandy's obvious flaws. Released 22 February 2008.
- Episode Eight – You Such a Photoshop: 3D Layers: Donnie tries to take his budding relationship with Sandy to the next level by showing her what he's willing to do to his house to welcome her and her "littlekin" sons (who are aspiring mini-car racers) to accommodate them. With 3D Layers, he's able to import a 3D model file and treat it as a maskable object in Photoshop. Released 7 March 2008.
- Episode Nine – You Suck a Photosack: Curves: Donnie gets denied by Sandy, and uses tomatoes as a surrogate for his desires. Curves allows him to use two differently lighted images and make them look as though they belong in the same photos. Also, Sn4tchbuckl3r breaks the news to Donnie that he's out of the Horde ... he's just too surly. Released 21 March 2008.
- Episode Ten – You Suck At Photoshop: Vanishing Point: At the end of his rope, a placid Donnie promises "something wonderful is going to happen to you", and, in his best Dave Bowmanesque voice, shows the viewer how to use Vanishing Point to create a train big enough to take all his friends to a special place ... and then goes there on his own, mysteriously escaping the SWAT team who have come to evict him from his house. Released 4 April 2008.
- Season-ending Tribute Episode – A Donnie Hoyle Tribute by Sn4tchbuckl3r: Sn4tchbuckler conference-calls with his Horde colleagues jeffb0yardee and pwnsurm0m (represented, respectively, by avatars depicting Mr. T and Ron Jeremy) and exhorts them to use Photoshop (or, maybe, the GIMP) to produce a suitable tribute to Donnie ... then dissolves the Horde. At the end of the episode we see Sn4tchbuckl3r logging into a new site: Peopleburg. This episode referred to a sidebar on the My Damn Channel site which he ostensibly "hacked" to allow download of the train track landscape seen in Episode 10 as well as a way to upload graphics as part of a Donnie tribute.

=== Season Two ===
Season Two debuted on My Damn Channel on 27 June 2008, with episode No. 11, and new episodes being released once every other week on Friday. As before, Donnie is at war with his lifestyle and the results of the life choices he's made. Despite his apparent sojourn to Peopleburg (as detailed in the short series Sn4tchbuckl3r's Second Chance and the placidity of his attitude in episode No. 10, he is just as stressed and anxious as he was before. The trajectory of this season starts with a losing paternity battle, the losing of which incites Donnie to do something incredibly stupid involving Thai thumb drives and a NERF jart that invoking Stephen Baldwin can't even save him from, and an apparent cross-country flight from Ricky (aka. the guy "drilling" his wife in the Vanagon in episode 1). Sna4tchbuckl3r and Sandy make returns to the storyline.

- You Suck at Photoshock: Smart Objects: in this episode, Donnie demonstrates the use of Smart Objects and how they can make changing multiple copies of a placed images quick and efficient. He does this in order to demonstrate that a certain child is not actually his. This marked the beginning of the "Don't Download Ronnie" campaign, in which viewers were negatively encouraged not to download a picture of a sperm cell, nicknamed Ronnie in the video lesson, and not to use it in a Photoshop mashup, which would then be posted to a fan gallery at My Damn Channel. Released 27 June 2008.
- Episode 12 – You Suck at Protoshop: Measurement Log: In this episode, Donnie explores his daddy issues (and, notably, has the scene from Star Wars where Luke finally confronts Darth Vader as his father) with Measurement Log, a tool so obscure that Donnie claims not even the Photoshop developers know it's there. By comparing a photo of himself as a child and his father as an infant Donnie hopes to "measure up" favorably; Measurement Log allows one-click recording of measurements and exporting of those measurements. The result is less than Donnie had hoped for. Along with more pleas not to download Ronnie, this episode was released on 11 July 2008.
- Episode 13 – You Phuck at Sotoshop: Displacement: Donnie's courtroom technique leads to tears ... but with Displacement, which can create a map of the texture of the surface, and can map letters realistically onto a wrinkled soccer jersey, Donnie can live the dream digitally. Released 25 July 2008.
- Episode 14 – You Suck at Photosho: Video Stuff Reall Fast: Donnie Hoyle is in trouble. After being implicated in a crime (of passion) involving the theft of $70,000 worth of Thai thumb drives and a Nerf jart, Donnie doesn't have time to show you how to use the video features of Photoshop CS3, while he attempts to edit himself out of ten seconds of video camera footage. Released 8 August 2008.
- Episode 15 – You Suck at Phatoshop: Define Pattern: Donnie has had to skip town fast, and is hiding out in a long-stay motel in an undisclosed location. Everything would be tolerable, however, if it wasn't for the human keg-tapping against the bed wall in the next room. Today, Donnie is going to solve his problems with Photoshop, and show you how to create an infinite soundproofing texture using the Define Pattern tool. This episode features the return of Sn4tchbuckl3r. Released 22 August 2008.
- Episode 16 – You Suck at Photoshop: Define Brush Preset: Still on the run, Donnie has ended up hiding with Sandy and the littlekins, where a freak accident involving some dangerous growth hormones has changed her...a bit. Donnie hides out in the second room and tries to blow off some steam with Photoshop, showing you the best way to define interesting brush presets. Released 25 August 2008.
- Episode 17 – You Suck at Photoshart: Automate: Photomerge]: The beginning of this episode reveals that Donnie has moved out of Sandy's house, and has apparently stolen some data that he's left on USB Flash Drives, which have been left in different locations around his home city (which is revealed in this episode to be Covington, Kentucky). Donnie uses the Photomerge feature of Photoshop to compile a map of the flash drive's locations, which he then sends on to Sn4tchbuckl3r to recover. Released 19 September 2008.
- You Suck At Photoshop Season 2 Sn4tchbuckl3r PSA: Having not found the drives Donnie located on the map for him, Sn4tchbuckl3r produces an appeal to honesty – that of Donnie, who may not have been honest about where the drives were stashed, or any "Covington area bottom-feeders" who may have beaten him to the drives and taken them to put them up for auction on eBay. The video opens with test color bars and the caption Sn4tchbuckl3r PSA/Peopleburg Liberation Front Communication Network, and displays a Peopleburg in flames, the sky filled with billowing red clouds. Even Sn4tch himself seems the worse for wear. An actual drive was put on auction on eBay with Sn4tchBuckl3r's name on the back which matched his description. The auction has since ended. Released 26 September 2008.
- Episode 18 – You Suck at Phodioshop: Annotations: Donnie explains how to use the text and audio annotation tools by responding to a threat letter he found on his door. The letter informs him he has until the end of the month to leave the person's house. Released 10 October 2008.
- Episode 19 – You Sulk at Photoshop: Shadows and Light: Donnie starts this video by opening a photo he has made entirely in photoshop that illustrates the mystery and light in his life. He talks about the "Ring of Infinite Sorrows" (which is coincidentally the name of the guild created in Peopleburg to take out the current authority and also the ring in episode 4 that Donnie removes) and how the ring has changed his life. Near the end of the video, Donnie calls Sn4tchbuckl3r for the first time to inform Sn4tch that has broken their trust by letting the thumb drives get in the hands of people who put the files on the internet. Donnie then shuts down Peopleburg through a script in Photoshop, and the last thing that can be heard from Sn4tchbuckl3r is, "I'm going to kill you Donnie Hoyle. I'm going to kill you." At the very end of the video, Donnie zoom in on the photo to see an old man staring at him through one of the castle windows (similar to the end of Episode 15). Released 17 October 2008.
- Episode 20 – You Sucjk at Photoshop: Distort, Warp, & Layer Effects: Donnie talks about how the past things he has done in Photoshop all were chain reactions that got started by the very first episode. He informs Ricky that he is sorry, and to "enjoy my wife." As he is putting the message on the car's driver side window, another voice tells Donnie that they are going to kill him. The mysterious voice is masked using a phaser and a pitch change. A picture of the actor who voices Donnie can be seen in the background. Many clues are revealed as to who the killer is, but they all lead to many different people. At the very end of the video, Donnie says, My name is Donnie...", a gunshot is heard, and then the camera cuts to Dane Cook, wounded and saying in the voice of Donnie, "...and you suck at Photoshop." There is a small reference to Dane Cook in the second episode of the series. Released 31 October 2008.

=== Season Three ===
As of 4 April 2012, My Damn Channel has started showing You Suck At Photoshop series, beginning with an offshoot series called You Rock At Photoshop, starting 4-year-old Ronnie Cox, the possible estranged child of Donnie Hoyle. The offshoot series tends to mimic the original in a happier tone voiced by little Ronnie. Following the first episode, two videos affidavits by Robert Davis-Brockweilder Munghj, the legal representative of the "late" Donnie Hoyle estate, notifying My Damn Channel that they were in violation of the Digital Millennium Copyright Act for the blatant copy.

The second episode of the You Rock At Photoshop started the same as the second episode of You Suck At Photoshop, but involving removing a robot instead of a cat. During the video, Ronnie Cox received a Skype message from Robert Davis-Brockweilder Munghj regarding how Robert was just attacked by a horde of 4-year-old children which he believed were sent to attack him by Ronnie. During the Skype call, you could hear a group of 4-year-olds breaking into the room where Robert was.

There was a third affidavit by Robery Davis-Brockweilder Munghj, where he appeared beaten, bounded and his head was covered. In this video he made mention that Donnie Hoyle was alive and he would return. Soon after, the sounds of 4-year-olds entering the room and attacking Robert occurred.

On 25 April 2012, the third season of You Suck At Photoshop started, with Donnie Hoyle creating an advertisement for Robert Davis-Brockweilder Munghj as payment for his services.
