= Omnivision Entertainment =

American digital entertainment company

- Formerly: My Damn Channel, Inc. (2007–2014)
- Founded: July 31, 2007
- Headquarters: New York City, New York; Los Angeles, California, U.S.
- Key people: Warren Chao & Rob Barnett (co-founders)
- Website: http://www.omnivisionent.com

My Damn Channel logo, 2007–2014

Omnivision Entertainment (formerly My Damn Channel) is a digital entertainment company. It has launched several original comedy series on YouTube and Dailymotion, including Wainy Days, Horrible People, You Suck at Photoshop, and videos by Harry Shearer.

== History ==
Omnivision was founded as My Damn Channel on July 31, 2007 by Rob Barnett and Warren Chao. In 2011, My Damn Channel was named one of Time Magazine's "50 Websites that Make the Web Great". In 2013, My Damn Channel entered into a partnership with digital media firm Blip in which the two companies would share exclusive first-run distribution for four original comedies.

In 2014, the company was renamed to Omnivision Entertainment, keeping My Damn Channel as a name for its YouTube and Dailymotion channels.

From November 2016 to March 2020, all social media accounts related to Omnivision and My Damn Channel remained dormant. No new content has been added to the My Damn Channel YouTube or Dailymotion channels since January 2015 and November 2016, respectively. Only DailyYou, former Omnivision associate channel of vlogger Grace Helbig, has uploaded new content since March 2020.
