= Alexia Bonatsos =

American venture capitalist and former technology journalist

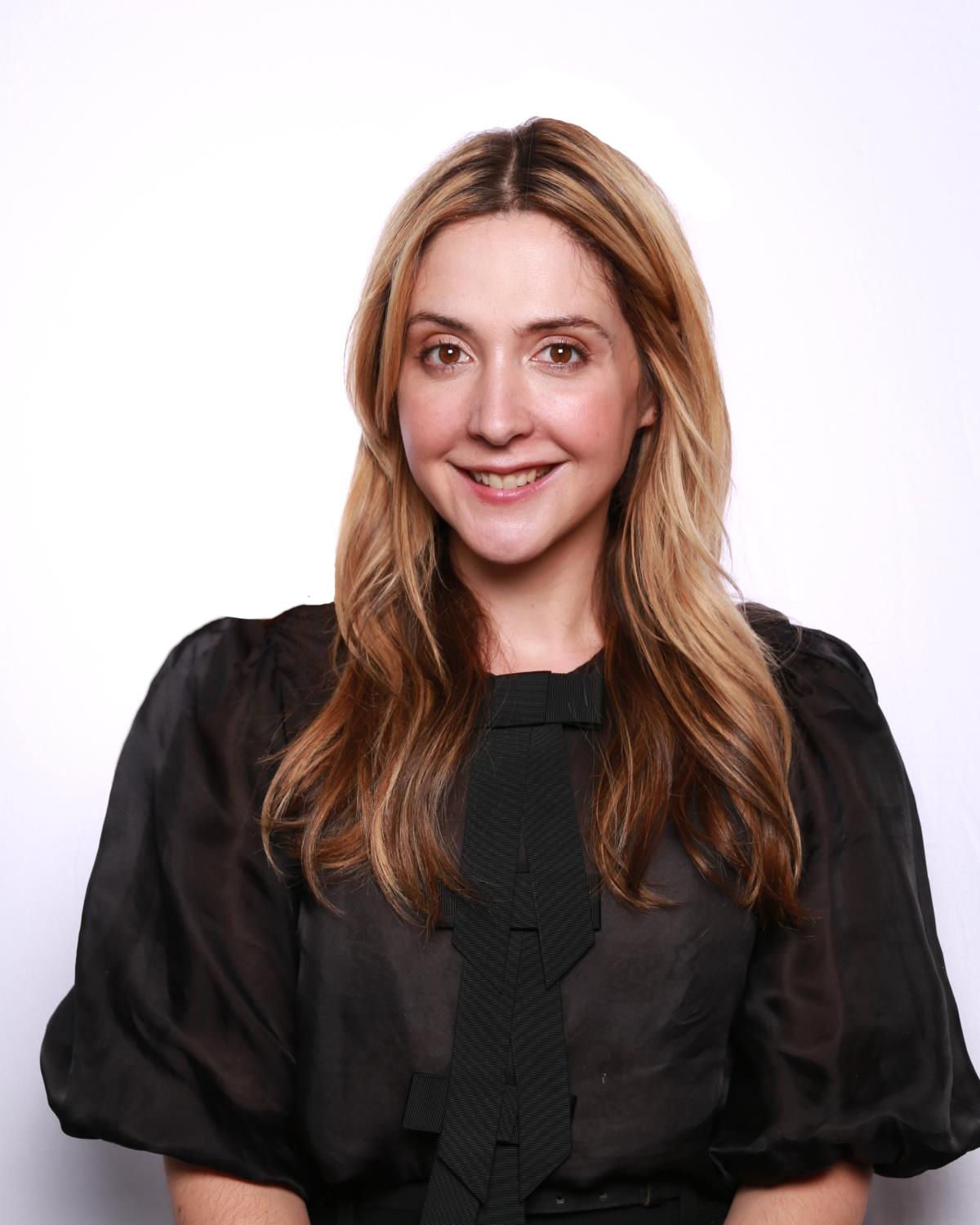
- Bonatsos in September 2018
- Born: Alexia Tsotsis; 1982 (age 43–44)
- Education: Stanford University; University of Southern California
- Occupation: General Partner of Dream Machine
- Spouse: Niko Bonatsos

Alexia Bonatsos, née Tsotsis (born 1982), is an American venture capitalist and former co-editor of TechCrunch, a technology news website. In 2011, she was listed by Forbes magazine as among the top 30 under 30 in the Media category.

== Early life and education ==
Alexia Tsotsis was born in 1982. She attended the University of Southern California in Los Angeles, California, majoring in writing and art, and then worked in New York for four years trying to enter the media business, also attending classes at New York University on the side. She then worked at LA Weekly (in Los Angeles) and after that at SF Weekly (in San Francisco, California).

== Career ==
In 2010, she joined TechCrunch. On February 27, 2012, Tsotsis became co-editor of TechCrunch along with Eric Eldon. The pair replaced Erick Schonfeld. This was one of the last of a string of departures that rocked the publication for the months since Michael Arrington's departure in late September 2011.

In August 2012, Business Insider published a detailed look at a day in the life of Tsotsis in her role as co-editor of TechCrunch. A video interview of Tsotsis by David Prager was broadcast on Revision3. Her approach to news coverage was also discussed in an article on the website of the Poynter Institute.

In 2015, she left TechCrunch to complete an accelerated 1 year Masters in Management program at Stanford University. She married Niko Bonatsos, a venture capitalist at General Catalyst, with whom she had cooperated on encouraging Greek technology startups in 2012.

In late 2017 and early 2018, using the name Bonatsos, she founded her own venture capital fund, called Dream Machine, based in San Francisco and investing in technology companies.

== Awards and recognition ==
Tsotsis was named among the Forbes 30 Under 30 in the media category in 2011.
