= Wadsworth Theatre =

Theatre in Los Angeles, California, USA

Coordinates: 34.0543°N 118.45823°W

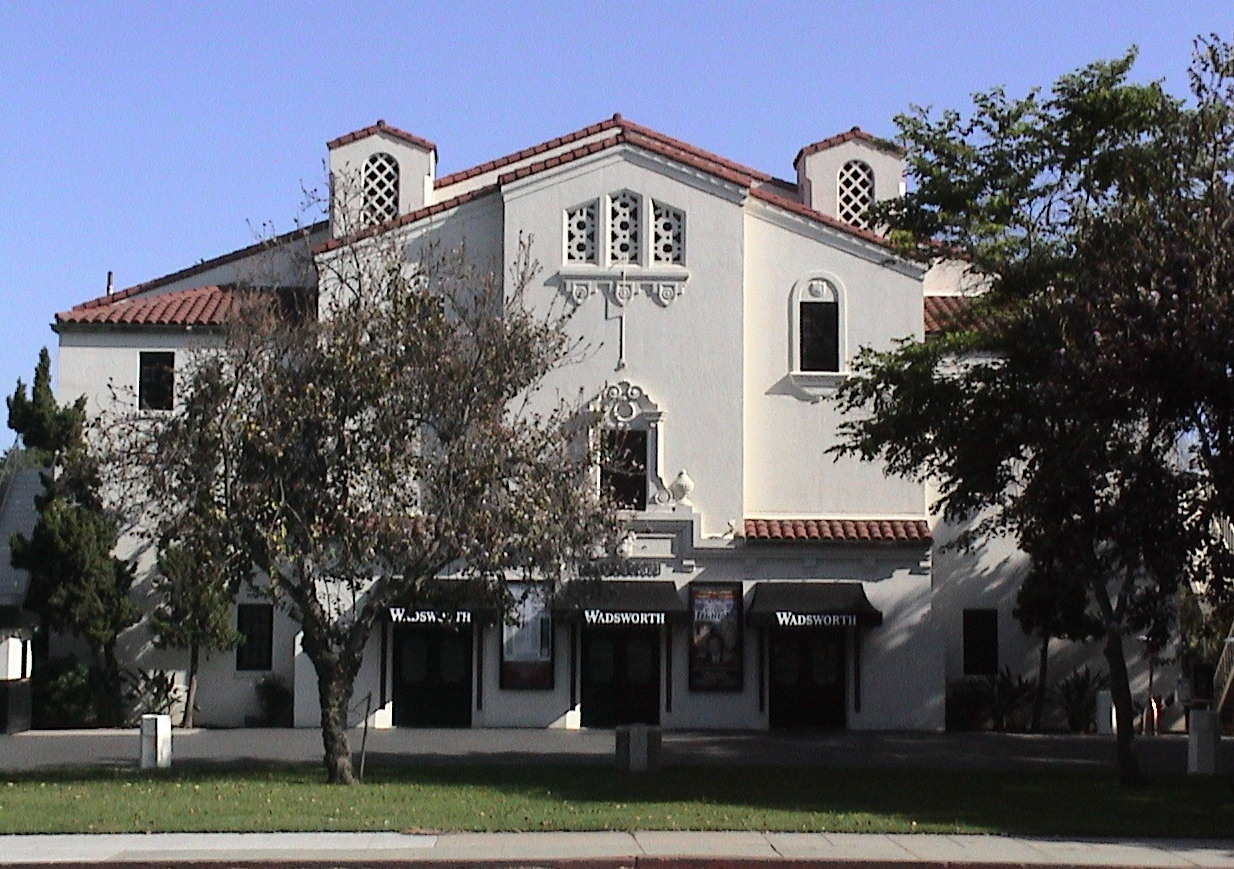
- Wadsworth Theatre facade.
- Interactive map of Wadsworth Theatre
- Address: Sawtelle, Los Angeles

The Wadsworth Theatre, a historic live theater, is located in the Sawtelle community of West Los Angeles, California, within the 388-acre West Los Angeles Department of Veterans Affairs complex. Situated on Eisenhower Avenue in Building 226, the theater is part of the historic Sawtelle Veterans Home, nestled between Wilshire Boulevard and San Vicente Boulevard on the east side of Brentwood.

Constructed in 1939, the Wadsworth Theatre was initially reported by the Los Angeles Times as a $162,000, designed to seat 1,500 people . The theater, built on the grounds of the Soldiers' Home at Sawtelle, served as a venue for theatrical productions and movies for veterans. Architecturally, it embodies the Mission Revival style, as listed on The National Register of Historic Places.

In 1976, the theater was named after Maj. James W. Wadsworth, a Civil War officer and advocate for disabled veterans. Over the years, the Wadsworth Theatre has hosted various notable film events, including a 1983 presentation of the classic film "The Passion of Joan of Arc," a 1984 Esther Williams retrospective, and a 1985 screening of "Spies Like Us" featuring appearances by Dan Akroyd and Chevy Chase. In 2000, Woody Allen made a rare public appearance for the screening of his film, Small Time Crooks.

In March 1992, the LA Times reported on a controversy involving the theater, which was being leased by UCLA at the time. A planned screening of the comedy satire "Article 99" faced opposition from the hospital, as the plot centered around a doctor-patient revolt in a veterans hospital. Due to concerns about the film's impact on psychiatric patients, the screening was eventually moved to UCLA's Royce Hall.

Today, the Wadsworth Theatre, operated by Richmark Entertainment, presents Broadway productions and other live events. Following an extensive renovation in 2002, which reduced seating capacity to 942, the theater has continued to host various Broadway shows, musical concerts, film premieres, and live theatrical productions. Since 2009, the annual Streamy Awards have also been held at the Wadsworth Theatre.

== See also ==
- Theatres in Los Angeles
