= Tubefilter =

American online entertainment media company

Tubefilter, Inc.
- Type: Private
- Industry: Internet, media, entertainment
- Founded: 2008; 18 years ago
- Founder: Drew Baldwin; Brady Brim-DeForest; Marc Hustvedt
- Headquarters: Los Angeles, California, United States
- Key people: Brady Brim-DeForest (CEO)
- Website: tubefilter.com

Tubefilter, Inc. is a privately held company based in Los Angeles, California, that operates media businesses focusing on the online entertainment industry. It publishes Tubefilter News, a blog targeted at the fans, creators, producers, influencers, and distributors of streaming television and web series content.

== Cited by ==
Tubefilter News has been cited by Variety, and its staff have been quoted by The Washington Post, The Christian Science Monitor, The Wrap, and BusinessWeek, when covering the streaming television industry. It is ranked in the top 1,600 blogs worldwide according to Technorati.

== Other operations ==
The company also operates and hosts the Streamy Awards, a weekly streaming television guide, and monthly web series meetups. In October 2009, Tubefilter acquired online entertainment and reviews site Tilzy.tv.

== Network ==
Tubefilter offers blogs and services on its network including:

- Tubefilter News (launched June 2008), a trade publication for the online entertainment industry.
- Tubefilter Jobs (launched February 2009), a new-media and streaming television focused job board.
- Web TV Schedule (launched August 2008), a guide to streaming television release schedules.

== Events ==
Tubefilter operates a series of events in Los Angeles and New York. These include:

- Onfronts (launched June 2009), a bi-annual digital upfront for the streaming television industry.
- Web TV Meetups (launched August 2008), a community event series in Los Angeles.
- Web TV Week (launched March 2009), a week-long series of streaming television events that takes place every spring and fall in Los Angeles.

== Programs and sponsorships ==
Tubefilter sponsors and promotes a number of streaming television-based award shows and foundations. They are a founding host of the Streamy Awards. They were also one of the founding media companies that formed the International Academy of Web Television.
