= Bree Essrig =

American actress and internet personality

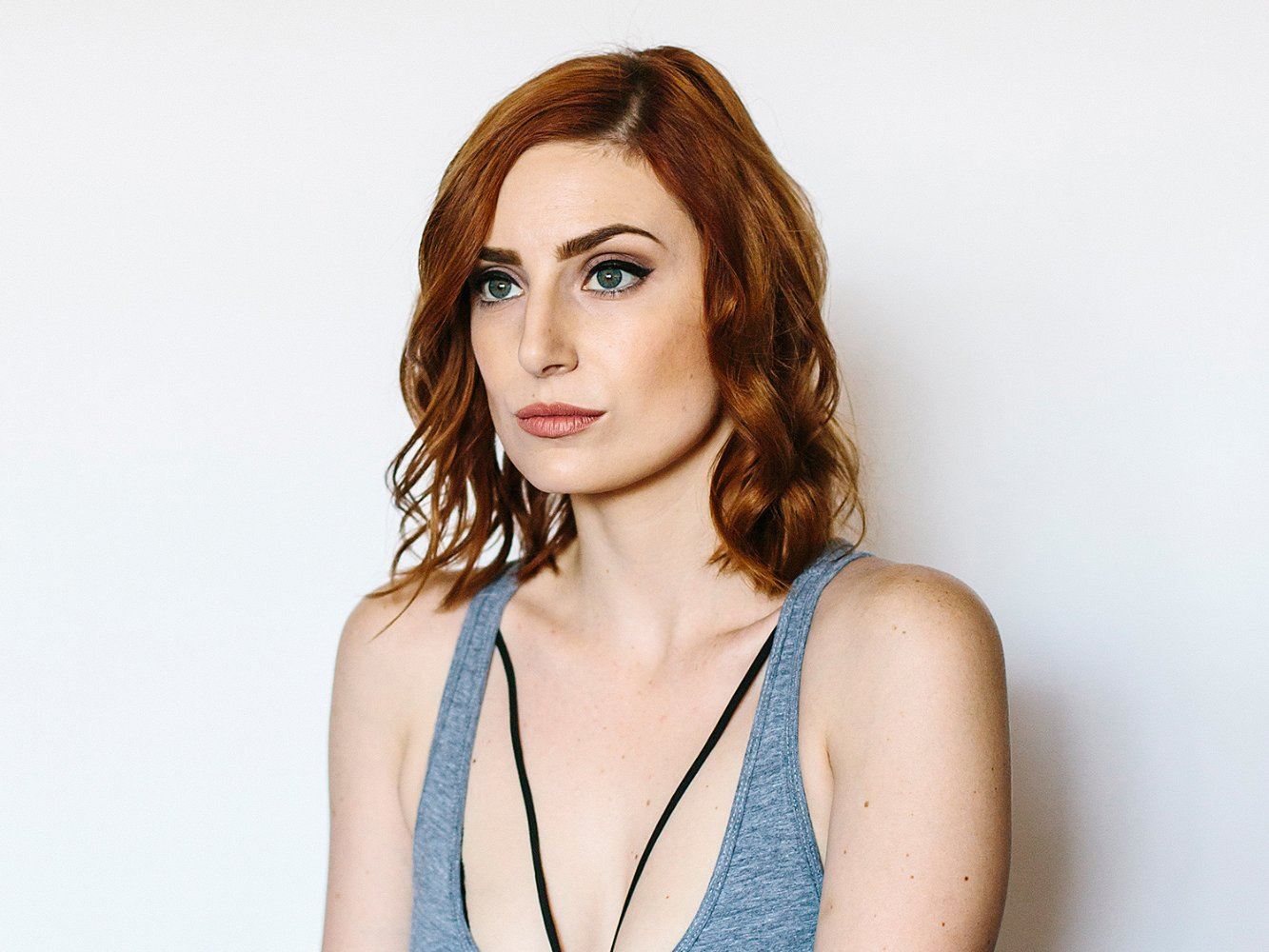
- Born: Breeana Danielle Essrig; April 21, 1990 (age 35)
- Occupations: Actress; writer; host; YouTube personality
- Years active: 2009–present
- Notable work: SourceFed, BlackBoxTV, Nuclear Family, Pop Trigger, Blood Shed
- Style: Satire, sketch comedy, dark comedy, current events, pop culture

YouTube information
- Channel: BREEessrig
- Genres: Comedy; sketch
- Subscribers: 285 thousand
- Views: 25.5 million
- Last updated: April 5, 2026

Breeana Danielle "Bree" Essrig (born April 21, 1990) is an American actress, writer, host, internet personality, and OnlyFans model known for her comedic writing and appearances on the news and current events series SourceFed. Essrig joined SourceFed as a host in 2015, and in 2017 was brought on to star in the daily Twitter series #whatshappening.

Essrig's personal YouTube channel has over 280,000 subscribers and 19 million views. and has appeared in a contest in Seventeen Magazine. She has also been in The Daily Dot, Uproxx, Elizabeth Banks' website WhoHaha, and Amy Poehler's Smart Girls.

== Background and personal life ==
In 2013, Essrig came out publicly as bisexual on The Rubin Report. Since then, she has been a public advocate against bullying, bi-erasure, body shaming, and sexual assault.

== Career ==
Essrig was a co-host on The Young Turks news and pop culture channel PopTrigger from 2012 to 2015 and a writer/host on SourceFed from 2015 to 2017. She has acted as a guest host on websites. She has appeared on Elizabeth Banks' comedy website WhoHaha. Essrig was nominated for a Shorty Award in 2017 for Best Comedian. She has made appearances at festivals and conventions as a celebrity influencer guest, host and commentator. She has appeared in BlackBoxTV Presents and was in Shane Dawson's music video for "Superluv" in 2012.
