= Streamy Awards =

Excellence in online video production

- Current: 13th Streamy Awards
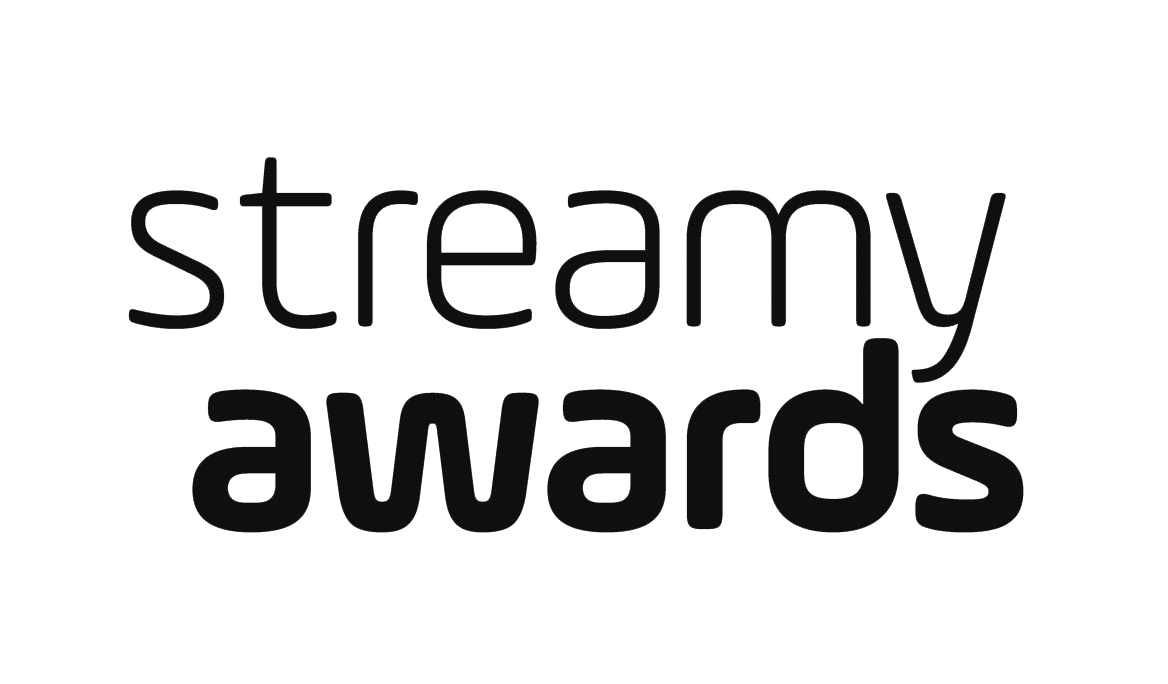
- Awarded for: Excellence in online video
- Country: United States
- Presented by: Tubefilter; Dick Clark Productions
- First award: March 28, 2009; 17 years ago
- Website: streamys.org

The YouTube Streamy Awards, also known as the Streamy Awards or Streamys, are an awards show presented annually by Dick Clark Productions and Tubefilter to recognize excellence in online video, including directing, acting, producing, and writing. The formal ceremony at which the awards are presented takes place in Los Angeles, California. It was the first awards show dedicated entirely to web series.

== History ==
=== 2009–2010: Establishment and first shows ===
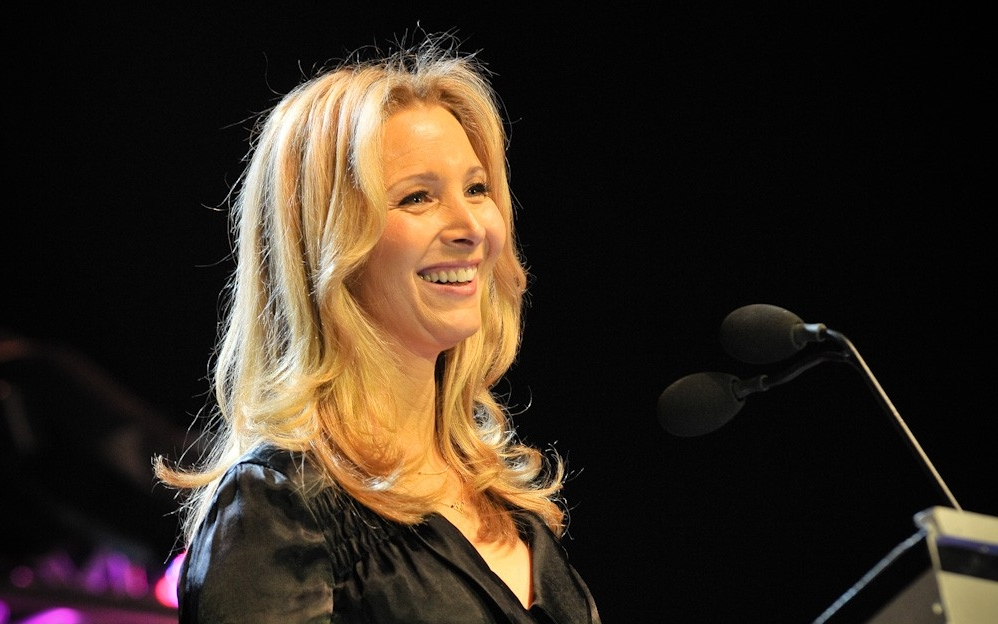
Lisa Kudrow at the 1st Annual Streamy Awards

The Streamy Awards were initially devised by Drew Baldwin, Brady Brim-DeForest and Marc Hustvedt of Tubefilter and Joshua Cohen and Jamison Tilsner of Tilzy.tv. Prior to the Streamy Awards, other award shows existed to celebrate online content, but the Streamy Awards was the first to celebrate web series in particular.

The 1st Annual Streamy Awards were held on March 28, 2009 at the Wadsworth Theatre in Los Angeles. Presented by the International Academy of Web Television (IAWTV) and co-hosted by Tubefilter, NewTeeVee and Tilzy.TV, the event was reportedly attended by 1,300 audience members. Winners in the 25 categories included The Guild and Dr. Horrible's Sing-Along, which both won multiple awards, Joss Whedon and Felicia Day.

The 2nd Annual Streamy Awards were hosted by comedian Paul Scheer and streamed live online from the Orpheum Theatre on April 11, 2010. The production experienced technical problems and interruptions due to people streaking the stage. Scheer's jokes were also poorly received with audience members and influencers in attendance finding them unfunny, sexist and deprecatory of internet culture. Due to poor reception and execution of the show, the IAWTV halted its partnership with Tubefilter and co-production of the award ceremony and formed their own Web TV awards presentation.

=== 2011–2019: Partnership with Dick Clark Productions ===
Following the poorly received 2nd Streamy Awards, the Streamys went into hiatus for two years. During this time, in 2011, Tubefilter entered a partnership with established entertainment industry awards show producer Dick Clark Productions (producers of the American Music Awards, among others) to co-produce the 3rd Streamy Awards in an attempt to repair the award's legitimacy. They were held in 2013 at the Hollywood Palladium in Los Angeles, and livestreamed across YouTube and multiple streaming networks simultaneously. Commentators noted the show's increased professionalism but some creators such as Felicia Day criticized the shift towards acceptance of old media.

The 4th Streamy Awards were hosted by Grace Helbig and Hannah Hart and were held on September 7, 2014 at The Beverly Hilton hotel in Beverly Hills. The event introduced ten new award categories, including one for the short-form video website Vine, and featured fan-voted submissions for the first time. A toast dedicated to the recently passed-away Joan Rivers was described as "the evening's most somber moment" and "an authentic and intimate salute". But the show was also criticized for being more corporate, with the inclusion of product placement and shout-outs to large companies.

The 5th Streamy Awards were broadcast live on VH1 on September 17, 2015, and hosted by Grace Helbig and Tyler Oakley. Held at the Hollywood Palladium, they were the first Streamy Awards to be televised. They were also simultaneously livestreamed. New award categories were once again added for videos posted to social media websites such as Instagram, Snapchat, and Vine. They were also the first Streamys to feature the Breakout Creator and Breakthrough Artist awards.

The 6th Streamy Awards were hosted by King Bach and broadcast live on YouTube on October 4, 2016, from The Beverly Hilton hotel. Unlike the 5th Streamy Awards, the show was not televised, apparently due to a desire to "return to its digital roots". The ceremony featured a medley of songs dedicated to Christina Grimmie, who was shot and killed outside of a concert venue earlier in the year, which was praised by a number of publications.

The 7th Streamy Awards were hosted by Jon Cozart and broadcast live on Twitter on September 26, 2017, from The Beverly Hilton. It featured the first live musical performance by the Village People in over 30 years. TheWrap described the event as "rowdy, political and Jake Paul-hating" and The Hollywood Reporter said that the night's main themes were politics and diversity. The first annual Purpose Awards @ the Streamys were also held on September 25, 2017, hosted by Burnie Burns and Ashley Jenkins.

The 8th Streamy Awards were hosted by The Try Guys and was broadcast live on YouTube on October 22, 2018, from the Beverly Hilton Hotel. The first annual Streamys Brand Awards on October 9, 2018, hosted by Alisha Marie and Remi Cruz. The 9th Streamy Awards was broadcast live on YouTube on December 13, 2019, from the Beverly Hilton Hotel. It was the first Streamy Award ceremony to run without a host. It added multiple international categories to honor global online content and a new Technology category.

=== 2020–present: YouTube acquisition ===
In 2020, YouTube acquired the naming rights to the Streamy Awards. The 10th Streamy Awards were broadcast on YouTube on December 12, 2020, and were hosted by drag queens Trixie Mattel and Katya Zamolodchikova. To adhere to social distancing restrictions, the duo presented the awards on a party bus being driven around Los Angeles. It introduced Creator Honor awards, presented by past Streamy Award winners to new creators that inspired them in 2020.

The 11th Streamy Awards were broadcast on YouTube on December 11, 2021. They were hosted by American YouTuber Larray, alongside Issa Twaimz, once again being driven in a party bus around Los Angeles. Billboard said the show had a "distinctly young vibe" and praised the continuation of the Creator Honor awards as a source of genuine moments. The show also contained sneak-peaks of YouTube videos by large creators and a special segment on MrBeast's Team Seas charity drive.

The 12th Streamy Awards were held on December 4, 2022, at The Beverly Hilton in Los Angeles and were hosted by the YouTuber Airrack (known in real life as Eric Decker), and also featured a performance by Yung Gravy. The show introduced new gaming-related awards and one for VTubers. The 13th Streamy Awards was held on August 27, 2023, at The Fairmont Century Plaza in Beverly Hills and was hosted by MatPat. MrBeast won Creator of the year for the fourth year in a row.

As of 2026, the most recent ceremony listed on the official Streamys website was the 13th Streamy Awards held in 2023. No awards shows after 2023 are listed.

== Award categories ==
The current award categories for the Streamy Awards are separated into the main Streamy Awards and the Streamys Brand Awards.

== List of shows ==
Edition	Year	Date	Venue	Host city	Host(s)	Broadcaster(s)
1st	2009	March 28	Wadsworth Theatre	Los Angeles	N/A	YouTube
2nd	2010	April 11	Orpheum Theatre	Los Angeles	Paul Scheer	YouTube
3rd	2013	February 17	Hollywood Palladium	Los Angeles	Chris Hardwick	YouTube
4th	2014	September 7	The Beverly Hilton	Beverly Hills	Grace Helbig and Hannah Hart	YouTube
5th	2015	September 17	Hollywood Palladium	Los Angeles	Grace Helbig and Tyler Oakley	VH1; YouTube
6th	2016	October 4	The Beverly Hilton	Beverly Hills	King Bach	YouTube
7th	2017	September 26	The Beverly Hilton	Beverly Hills	Jon Cozart	Twitter
8th	2018	October 22	The Beverly Hilton	Beverly Hills	The Try Guys	YouTube
9th	2019	December 13	The Beverly Hilton	Beverly Hills	N/A	YouTube
10th	2020	December 12	A travelling party bus (Note: From 2020 to 2021, the show was presented from inside a party bus travelling around Los Angeles, California due to the COVID-19 pandemic.)	Los Angeles	Trixie Mattel and Katya Zamolodchikova	YouTube
11th	2021	December 11	A travelling party bus	Los Angeles	Larray and Issa Twaimz	YouTube
12th	2022	December 4	The Beverly Hilton	Beverly Hills	Airrack	YouTube
13th	2023	August 27	Fairmont Century Plaza	Beverly Hills	MatPat	YouTube

== See also ==
- Shorty Awards
- Emmy Awards
- Webby Awards
- List of web awards
- TikTok Awards Night
