= Apocalyptour (album) =

Live album by StarKid Productions
- Released: October 2, 2012
- Recorded: May 2012; House of Blues, Los Angeles
- Genre: Show tunes
- Length: 91:56
- Language: English
- Label: StarKid Productions
- Producer: Mark Swiderski

StarKid Productions chronology
Holy Musical B@man! (2012)	Apocalyptour (2012)	A Very StarKid Senior Year (2012)

The Apocalyptour live album contains the songs from the tour of the same name by StarKid Productions. It was recorded at one of three concerts at the House of Blues, Los Angeles in May 2012. The album features live performances of songs from the group's previous productions, and was released digitally on October 2, 2012 through iTunes and Amazon.com. A physical compact disc was released on the same day via the Ann Arbor T-shirt Company.

== Background ==
Apocalyptour was the second concert tour of StarKid Productions, and took place just six months after The SPACE Tour. Its title is a reference to the predicted 2012 phenomenon. Apocalyptour visited twenty-one cities in North America, including (unlike the prior tour) some on the West Coast. The tour consisted of performances of songs from the group's previous productions: Little White Lie, A Very Potter Musical, Me and My Dick, A Very Potter Sequel, Starship and Holy Musical B@man!.

The nine regular performers for the tour were joined by Darren Criss for two concerts - one in Los Angeles and one in New York City. For the Los Angeles concert from which the album was recorded, Criss did not perform.

Unlike The SPACE Tour, Apocalyptour was more akin to the stage performances of the group - featuring an original storyline written by Brian Holden, Nick Lang and Matt Lang (see Plot below). The live album features much of the dialogue from this, primarily on the tracks "This Is Where the Trolley Ends", "Team FartKid", "Dialogue Worth $35" and "This Really Sucks for Me".

== Plot ==
Having given up singing and dancing in favour of archaeology, the StarKids uncover a mysterious stone tablet among ancient Mayan ruins. Upon reading the tablet out loud, they accidentally awaken Ma'au Guurit - the Mayan God of Chaos and Death - who wishes to destroy the world.

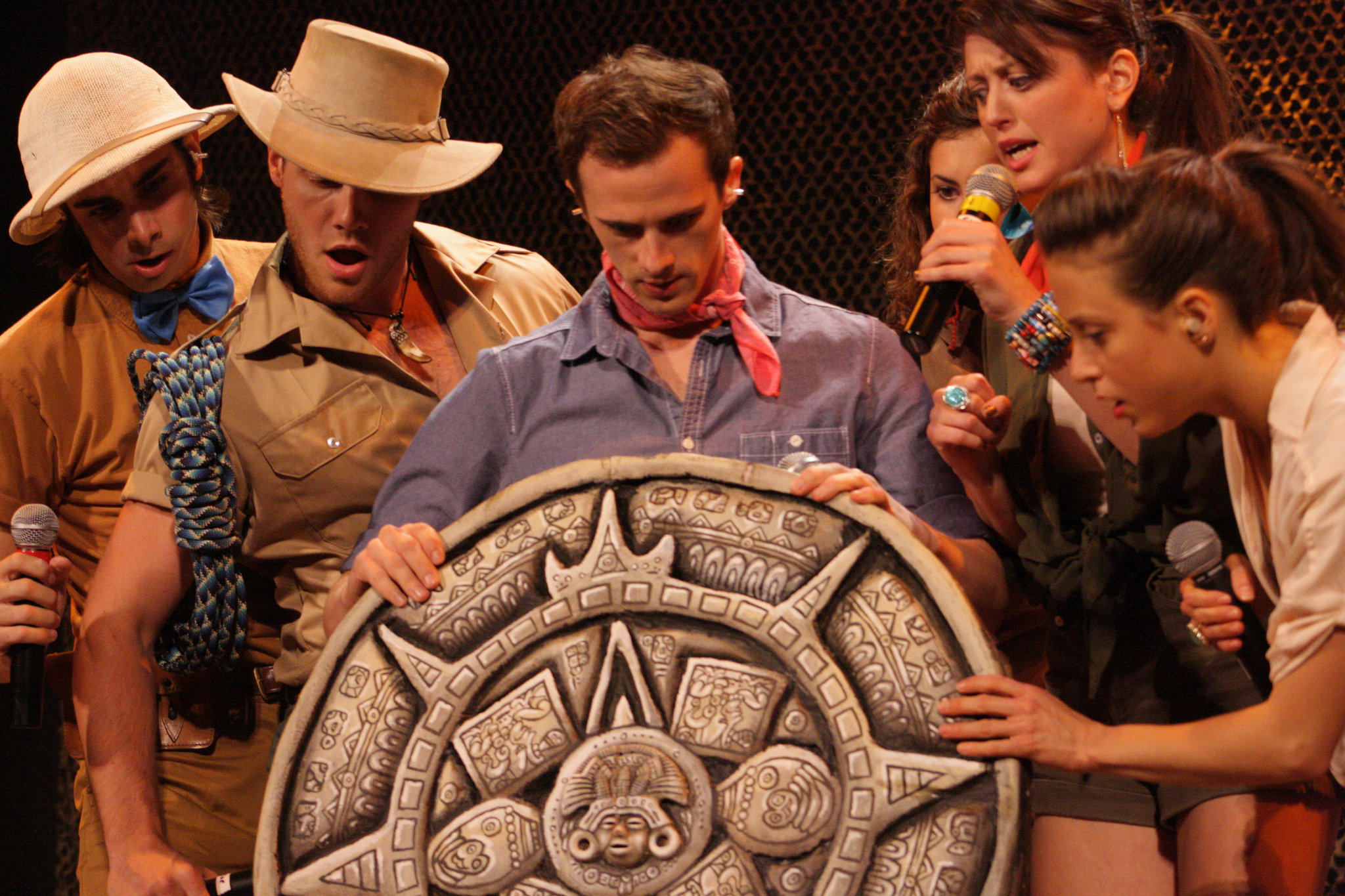
The StarKids discover a mysterious stone tablet.

It appears to be a prophecy describing what the Mayans referred to as a troupe called 'Dikrats', and how they bring about the end of the Earth. Number one: one of the Dikrats will be consumed by a giant fox. Number two: one of the Dikrats will lead the Jews out of Egypt, and then go on to host his own 'One Man Showses'. And number three: it says the Dikrats will find this very tablet, and by reading it out loud summon... the Mayan God of Chaos and Death.

— Jaime Lyn Beatty, Apocalyptour, "This Is Where the Trolley Ends"

In an attempt to appease 'Margaret' - who also happens to be the God of Musical Theatre - and prevent the world's destruction, the StarKids are forced to sing and dance once more, as they put on a musical theatre concert. At first, Margaret is not impressed, calling their performance "skimpy and lyrically uninspired". In desperation, the StarKids resort to human sacrifice, removing Joey's Heart (which, like in Me and My Dick, is anthropomorphised). Margaret is impressed by the musical performance of Joey's Heart, and the StarKids decide to perform more of their "other unknown hits".

Eventually, Margaret is pleased with them, calling their performance "totally awesome". The StarKids celebrate, only to be told by Margaret that he still has to destroy the world, as it is his job. He then receives a phone call from his "Mayan deity boss", asking why he hasn't yet destroyed the world. It emerges that the Mayan calendar did not account for leap years, and so Margaret should have destroyed the world several months prior. He is fired and stripped of his powers, but is consoled by the StarKids, who suggest that he should come with them on their expedition.

== Songs ==
"Going Back to Heaven During Those Days of Hogwarts On Earth"
An example of a medley of songs from different StarKid productions. Here, "Goin' Back to Hogwarts" from A Very Potter Musical leads into "Finale" from Me and My Dick.

Apocalyptour consists of live renditions of songs from the group's previous productions: Little White Lie, A Very Potter Musical, Me and My Dick, A Very Potter Sequel, Starship and Holy Musical B@man!. Clark Baxtresser, who also played keyboard in the live band, reprised his role as music director - having previously held the role for The SPACE Tour. While full sheet music existed for Holy Musical B@man! (which had been performed in March of that year), virtually none existed for the other shows - requiring Baxtresser to transcribe the music by ear from the original recordings. Some of this transcription work had already been done for The SPACE Tour.

Due to the limited cast, most songs were rearranged to be performed by different vocalists than those who originally did so. The only songs to feature all of their original performers were "Different As Can Be” and "Granger Danger". Additionally, some songs from different productions were combined to form medleys - including "Rogues Medley" and "Going Back to Heaven During Those Days of Hogwarts On Earth" (see Medleys below).

The opening number of the concert, "Me and My Dick/Ready to Go", features the first two songs of StarKid's second musical Me and My Dick. The word 'dick' was jokingly omitted from the lyrics - cast members interrupting each other before they could finish the phrase "It's me and my...". The closing number of the concert, "Going Back to Heaven...", features a reprise of "Me and My Dick" - in which Joey Richter does eventually complete the lyric. However, the word was used priorly by Brian Rosenthal in "Listen to Your Heart" - another song from the same production.

== Release ==
=== Cover art ===
Upon release, the artwork for the digital versions of the album on iTunes and Amazon.com contained a spelling error. The subtitle "LIVE ALBUM" was misspelled "LIVE ABLUM" (see infobox above). While the artwork on the iTunes release was subsequently corrected, the artwork on the Amazon.com release was not. The artwork for the physical CD release did not contain this error.

== Track listing ==
NB: Tracks which have no featured performers were performed by the entire group.

No.	Title	Writer(s)	Featured Performer(s)	Length
1.	"Me and My Dick/Ready to Go" (from Me and My Dick)	Darren Criss, A.J. Holmes, Carlos Valdes		8:29
2.	"This Is Where the Trolley Ends"			6:27
3.	"Get Back Up" (from Starship)	Criss	Lauren Lopez, Joseph Walker	3:00
4.	"Guys Like Potter" (from A Very Potter Sequel)	Criss	Brian Holden	3:21
5.	"The Way I Do" (from Starship)	Criss	Jaime Lyn Beatty, Joey Richter, Dylan Saunders, Meredith Stepien	4:09
6.	"Different As Can Be" (from A Very Potter Musical)	Holmes	Brian Rosenthal, Walker	3:27
7.	"Rogues Medley" (featuring songs from A Very Potter Sequel, Starship and Holy Musical B@man!)	Criss, Nick Gage, Scott Lamps		7:53
8.	"Team FartKid"			3:25
9.	"Listen to Your Heart" (from Me and My Dick)	Holmes, Valdes	Richter, Rosenthal	3:44
10.	"Dialogue Worth $35"			0:42
11.	"Little White Lie Medley" (featuring songs from Little White Lie)	Criss, Grant Anderson, Mark Swiderski	Beatty, Lopez, Richter, Rosenthal, Saunders, Stepien	4:29
12.	"Missing You" (from A Very Potter Musical)	Holmes	Holden, Rosenthal	2:46
13.	"Sami/Harry" (from Little White Lie and A Very Potter Musical)	Criss	Beatty, Saunders	3:25
14.	"Granger Danger" (from A Very Potter Musical)	Criss	Lopez, Richter	3:30
15.	"Dark, Sad, Lonely Knight" (from Holy Musical B@man!)	Gage, Lamps	Walker	4:39
16.	"Not Alone" (from A Very Potter Musical)	Criss	Beatty	3:48
17.	"This Really Sucks for Me"			4:02
18.	"Going Back to Heaven During Those Days of Hogwarts On Earth" (featuring songs from A Very Potter Musical, Me and My Dick and A Very Potter Sequel)	Criss, Holmes, Valdes		7:20
19.	"To Dance Again" (from A Very Potter Musical)	Holmes		4:31
20.	"The Coolest Girl" (from A Very Potter Sequel)	Criss	Stepien	3:05
21.	"The Sexiest Band in North America"			1:13
22.	"Super Friends" (from Holy Musical B@man!)	Gage, Lamps		4:31
Total length:				91:56

All songs re-arranged for live performance by Clark Baxtresser.

The above track numbers are for the digital versions of the album - the two-disc CD release featured 11 tracks on each disc.

=== Medleys ===
- "Rogues Medley" - a medley of villain songs:
  - "Not Over Yet" from A Very Potter Sequel
  - "Kick It Up a Notch" from Starship
  - "Rogues Are We" from Holy Musical B@man!
  - "Rogues Are We (Reprise)" from Holy Musical B@man!
- "Little White Lie Medley" - a medley of songs from the web series Little White Lie:
  - "Caught In the Lie"
  - "Boy Toy"
  - "Fancy Machine"
  - "Love Grenade"
- "Going Back to Heaven During Those Days of Hogwarts On Earth" - a medley of final numbers:
  - "Days of Summer" from A Very Potter Sequel
  - "Goin' Back to Hogwarts" from A Very Potter Musical
  - "Finale" from Me and My Dick

== Personnel ==
Performers

- Jaime Lyn Beatty- soprano vocals
- Brian Holden- baritone vocals
- Lauren Lopez- soprano vocals
- Jim Povolo- bass vocals
- Joey Richter- tenor vocals
- Brian Rosenthal- tenor vocals
- Dylan Saunders- tenor vocals
- Meredith Stepien- alto vocals
- Joe Walker- baritone vocals

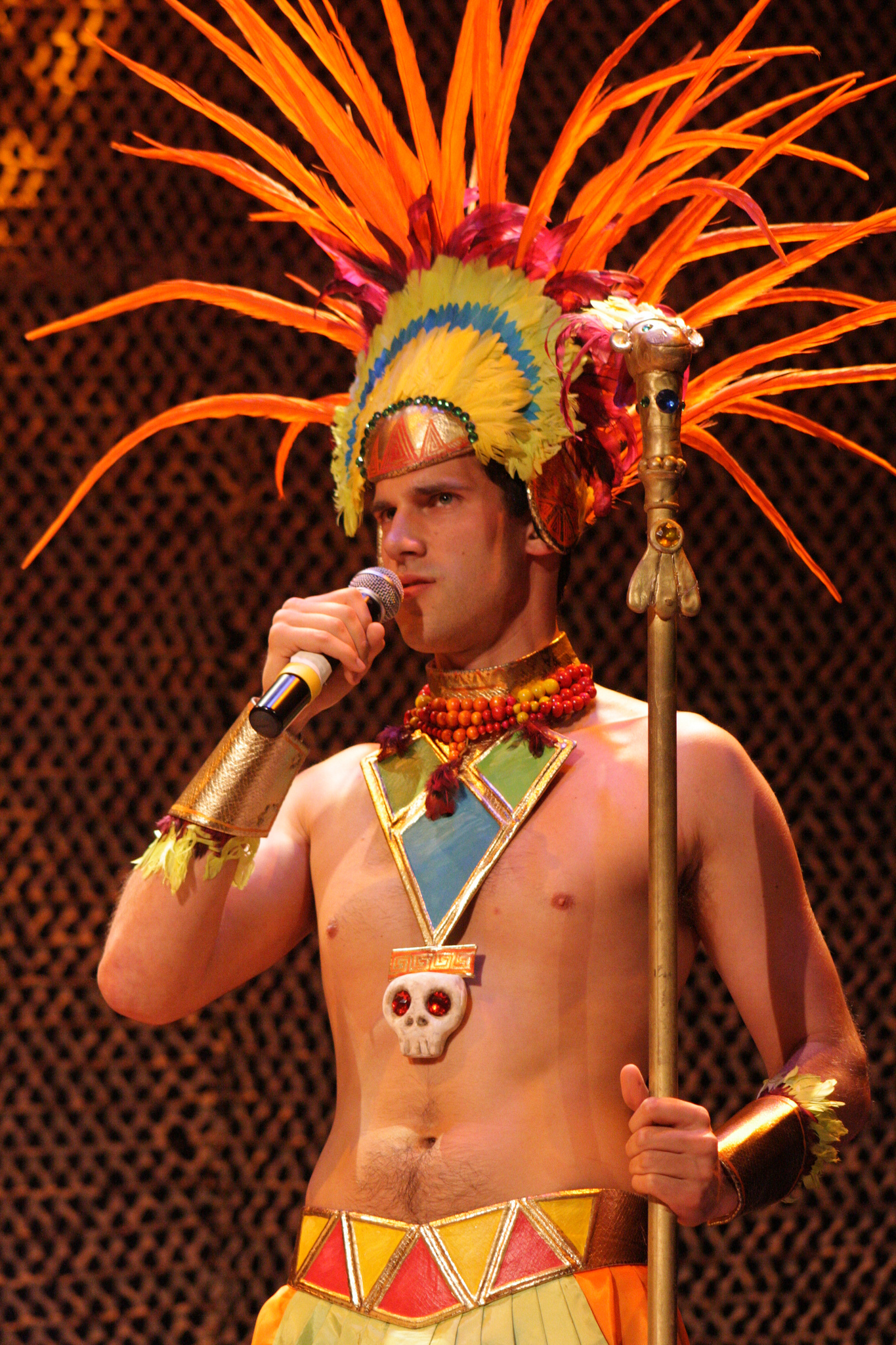
Jim Povolo as Ma'au Guurit.

Band

- Clark Baxtresser – keyboards
- Megan Cox – keyboards, violin
- Charlene Kaye – guitar
- Dave Scalia – drums
- Tomek Miernowski – bass guitar

Technical

- Mark Swiderski – producer
- Kevin DeKimpe – sound recordist

== Chart performance ==
Chart (2012)	Peak position
US Billboard Top Cast Albums	3

== Other appearances ==
- All non-dialogue tracks on this album are live recordings of previously released songs.
