= Charlene Kaye =

American singer-songwriter (born 1986)

- Charlene Kaye in Chicago in 2025

Background information
- Also known as: KAYE
- Born: September 12, 1986 (age 40); Honolulu, Hawaii, United States
- Genres: Pop rock; indie rock
- Occupations: comedian; musician; actor
- Instruments: Vocals; piano; guitar; bass
- Years active: 2008–present
- Formerly of: San Fermin
- Website: kayeofficial.com

Charlene Kaye (born September 12, 1986) is an American musician, comedian and actor, most known for her viral comedic videos, her solo comedy show Tiger Daughter: Or, How I Brought My Immigrant Mother Ultimate Shame, and her solo music career.

== Music ==
=== As Charlene Kaye ===
In 2009, Kaye released her first album Things I Will Need in the Past, which she recorded as a student at the University of Michigan.

In 2011, Kaye released the song "Dress and Tie", a duet with Darren Criss.

She released her second full-length album Animal Love in 2012. It reached #15 on the iTunes pop charts in the week of release and received praise from PopMatters and support from Glamour. The New Yorker described it as "a richly orchestrated pop album".

In March 2011 and 2013, Kaye played at the SXSW Music Festival in Austin, Texas.

=== Miracle Musical: Hawaii: Part II ===
Kaye was involved in the Miracle Musical album Hawaii: Part II, the side project of Tally Hall member Joe Hawley, which released on December 12, 2012.

Kaye wrote and provided vocals for the eighth song in the album Hawaii: Part II. Kaye's likeness was also used in the Labyrinth music video released on December 14, 2014.

=== San Fermin ===
In April 2014, Kaye joined the collective San Fermin. She toured behind the band's previously released record San Fermin and later, as a full member, recorded the band's following two records, Jackrabbit (2015) and Belong (2017). In April 2019, the band announced that, after five years, Kaye was leaving to pursue her solo career.

Her final performance was on April 26, 2019, at San Fermin's special concert to promote their new live record Live At The Fillmore (2019) and their documentary film No Promises.

=== KAYE ===
While touring with San Fermin on their Jackrabbit tour, Kaye began a new solo project under the name KAYE. Her first release was a pair of promotional singles, "Honey" and "UUU", in July 2016. She released a five-track EP on September 29, 2016, titled Honey. This was followed by three non-album singles, "Parakeeter" (November 2016), "Cheshire Kitten" (July 2017) and "Bamboo" (September 2017). In April 2019, Kaye was focusing on writing and recording music as KAYE full-time.

In 2020, she released the album Conscious Control, produced by Kaye and longtime friend Kirk Schoenherr. She released a music video for lead single "Closer Than This," which led Rolling Stone to describe her as "a fully realized pop goddess."

In 2022, Kaye released the Neon God EP with music videos for singles "Neon God,", "Lifeline," and "Respect Me," all directed by her sister, filmmaker Liann Kaye.

As of October 2025, Kaye announced that she has been working on a new album.

=== King Mei Mei ===
On January 1, 2026, Kaye announced a new musical project under the name King Mei Mei.

=== Other bands ===
Kaye is a fan of starting humorous tribute bands, such as Guns N' Hoses (all girl Guns N' Roses), Labiahead (all girl Radiohead) and No Gout, a medieval tribute to No Doubt.

== Comedy ==
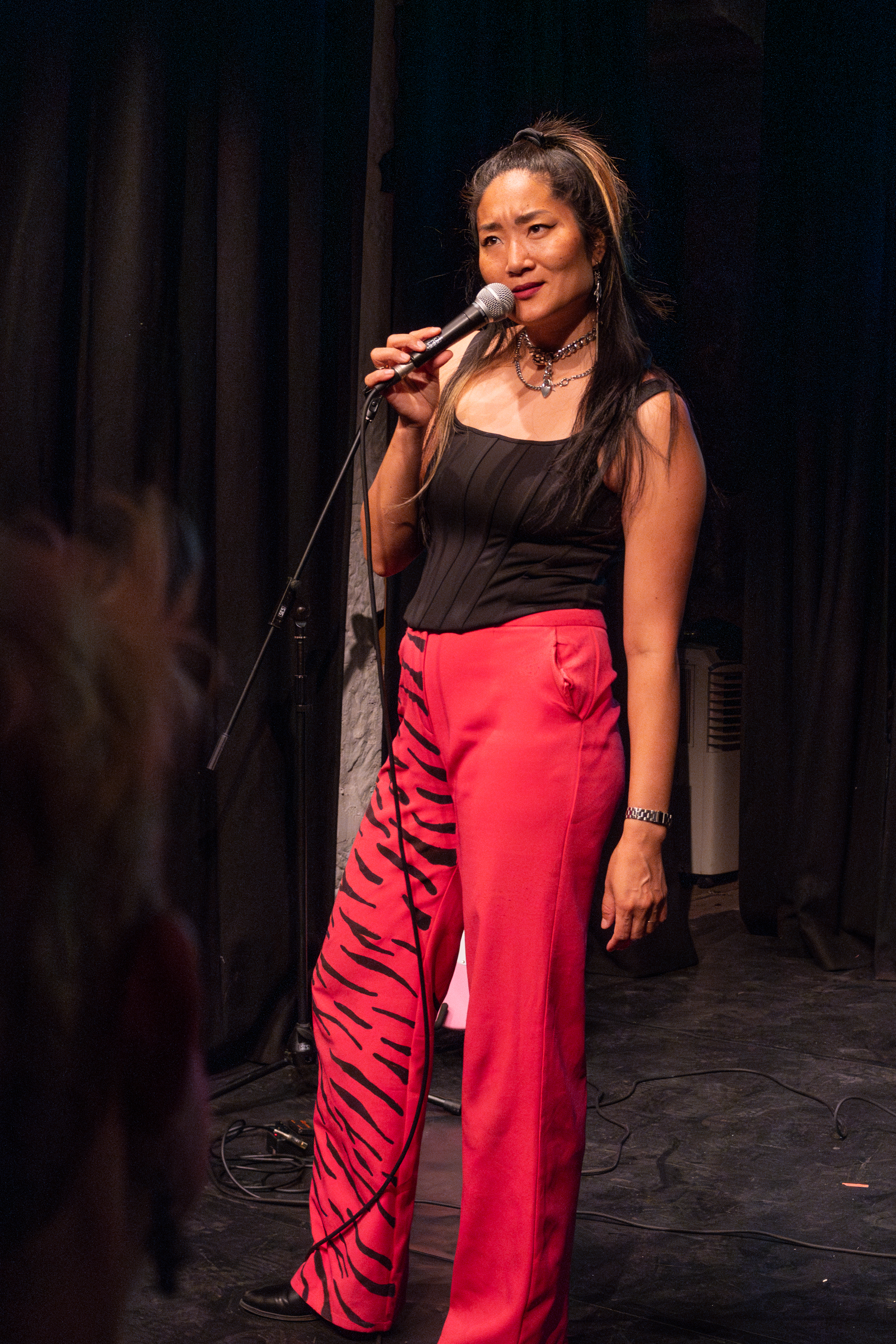
Charlene Kaye at the 2024 Edinburgh Festival Fringe in Edinburgh, Scotland.

In 2023, Kaye premiered her first solo comedy show called "Tiger Daughter: Or, How I Brought My Immigrant Mother Ultimate Shame," about her complex relationship with her mother, directed by Jennifer Monaco. The show has received widespread acclaim, with Margaret Cho coming on board in 2024 to produce the show, saying she was a huge fan of Kaye's.

Around this time, Kaye began creating humorous videos on Instagram and TikTok breaking down the styles of various pop musicians, such as Taylor Swift, Chappell Roan, Lady Gaga, Ariana Grande, Ed Sheeran and more. This series collectively has hundreds of millions of views, often with the artists themselves commenting on her videos.

Rolling Stone named Kaye a "breakout comedy star" in their 2025 Comics to Watch issue, and CBS News did a profile on her entitled "How Charlene Kaye Turned Pop Parody into Viral Gold." Kaye performed Tiger Daughter at the Edinburgh Fringe Festival 2024 and Melbourne International Comedy Festival in 2025, and it will soon be captured as her first comedy special.

Kaye has performed several work-in-progress versions of her next hour-long comedy special, which she described on her Instagram as a "madcap musical about being an Asian guitar shredder in America."

== Personal life ==
Kaye was born in Honolulu, Hawaii. She grew up outside Phoenix, Arizona, also living for a time in Singapore, Hong Kong and Michigan during childhood. She began playing music at an early age, taking lessons in violin, piano, guitar, ukulele, saxophone and clarinet.

Kaye attended the University of Michigan as an English major, where she befriended members of Team Starkid such as Darren Criss, Jaime Lyn Beatty and Lauren Lopez. She played guitar in their backing band on S.P.A.C.E. Tour and Apocalyptour, and opened for them with her own music on both tours.

== Discography ==
=== As Charlene Kaye ===
Albums

- Things I Will Need in the Past (2008)
- Animal Love (2012)
- Hawaii: Part II (2012)

EPs and Remix Compilations

- Charlene Kaye & The Brilliant Eyes EP (2012)
- Animal Love // Remixes (2013)

Singles

- "Skin and Bones (ft. Darren Criss)" (2008)
- "Dress and Tie (ft. Darren Criss)" (2011)
- "Animal Love I" (2012)
- "Hummingbird Heart" (2012)
- "Forever Is a Long Time" (2012)
- "Animal Love II" (2013)
- "Woman Up (Dave Scalia Remix) [ft. Kalae Nouveau]" (2013)

=== As KAYE ===
Albums

- Conscious Control (2020)

EPs

- HONEY EP (2016)
- Neon God EP (2022)

Singles

- "Honey" (2016)
- "UUU" (2016)
- "Parakeeter" (2016)
- "Cheshire Kitten" (2017)
- "Bamboo" (2017)

=== With San Fermin ===
Albums

- Jackrabbit (2015)
- Belong (2017)
- Live At The Fillmore (2019)

Singles

- "Jackrabbit" (2015)
- "No Devil" (2015)
- "Shiver" with Sam Amidon (2016)
- "Open" (2017)
- "No Promises" (2017)
- "Bride" (2017)
- "Belong" (2017)
- "Asleep on the Train" (2017)
