= Starship (album) =

Cast recording by StarKid Productions
- Released: April 30, 2011
- Recorded: 2011
- Genre: Showtunes
- Length: 28:21
- Label: StarKid Productions

StarKid Productions chronology
A Very Potter Sequel (2010)	Starship (2011)	The SPACE Tour (2012)

The Starship album contains the songs from the musical of the same name produced by StarKid Productions, with music and lyrics by Darren Criss, and book by Matt Lang, Nick Lang, Brian Holden, and Joe Walker. It was recorded by the musical's cast and was released digitally on April 30, 2011, through iTunes and Amazon.com. The album debuted at No. 134 on Billboard 200 and No. 1 for Top Cast Albums. The album also reached No. 4 on iTunes.

== Track listing ==
All tracks are written by Darren Criss.

No.	Title	Performer(s)	Length
1.	"I Wanna Be"	Joey Richter, Brant Cox, StarKid Company	3:54
2.	"Get Back Up"	Lauren Lopez, Joe Walker, Julia Albain, Joe Moses, Dylan Saunders	2:27
3.	"Life"	Joey Richter	2:06
4.	"Hideous Creatures"	StarKid Company	2:04
5.	"Kick It Up a Notch"	Dylan Saunders, Joey Richter, Jaime Lyn Beatty, Brian Holden, Jim Povolo	6:57
6.	"Status Quo"	Joey Richter	2:51
7.	"The Way I Do"	Dylan Saunders, Meredith Stepien, Denise Donovan, Joey Richter	3:55
8.	"Kick It Up a Notch" (Reprise)	Brian Holden	0:51
9.	"Beauty"	Brant Cox, StarKid Company	3:16
Total length:			28:21

== Personnel ==
Featured Performers

Actor/Actress	Character
Joey Richter	Bug
Joe Walker	Up
Lauren Lopez	Taz; Bugette Bugington
Dylan Saunders	Tootsie Noodles; Pincer
Denise Donovan	February
Brian Holden	Junior; Veeto Mosquito
Meredith Stepien	Mega-Girl
Julia Albain	Specs
Brant Cox	Roach
Jim Povolo	The Overqueen; Sweetheart Mosquito
Joe Moses	Krayonder
Jaime Lyn Beatty	Neato Mosquito
Nick Lang	The Caller Bug; Mister Bug

Credits

- Jack Stratton – producer, mixer, drums, percussion, keyboards, synthesizers, bass guitar, guitar
- Clark Baxtresser – piano
- Darren Criss – guitar

== Chart performance ==
Chart (2011)	Peak position
US Billboard 200	134
US Billboard Top Cast Albums	1
US iTunes Top Albums	4
