= NPMD =

NPMD may refer to:

- Non-psychotic major depressive disorder, in order to distinguish this condition from psychotic major depression (PMD)
- North Papuan Mainland–D'Entrecasteaux languages, a putative group of Papuan Tip languages
- Network Performance Monitoring & Diagnostics
- Nerdy Prudes Must Die, a 2023 musical by StarKid Productions
