= Potty the Plant =

Dark musical comedy

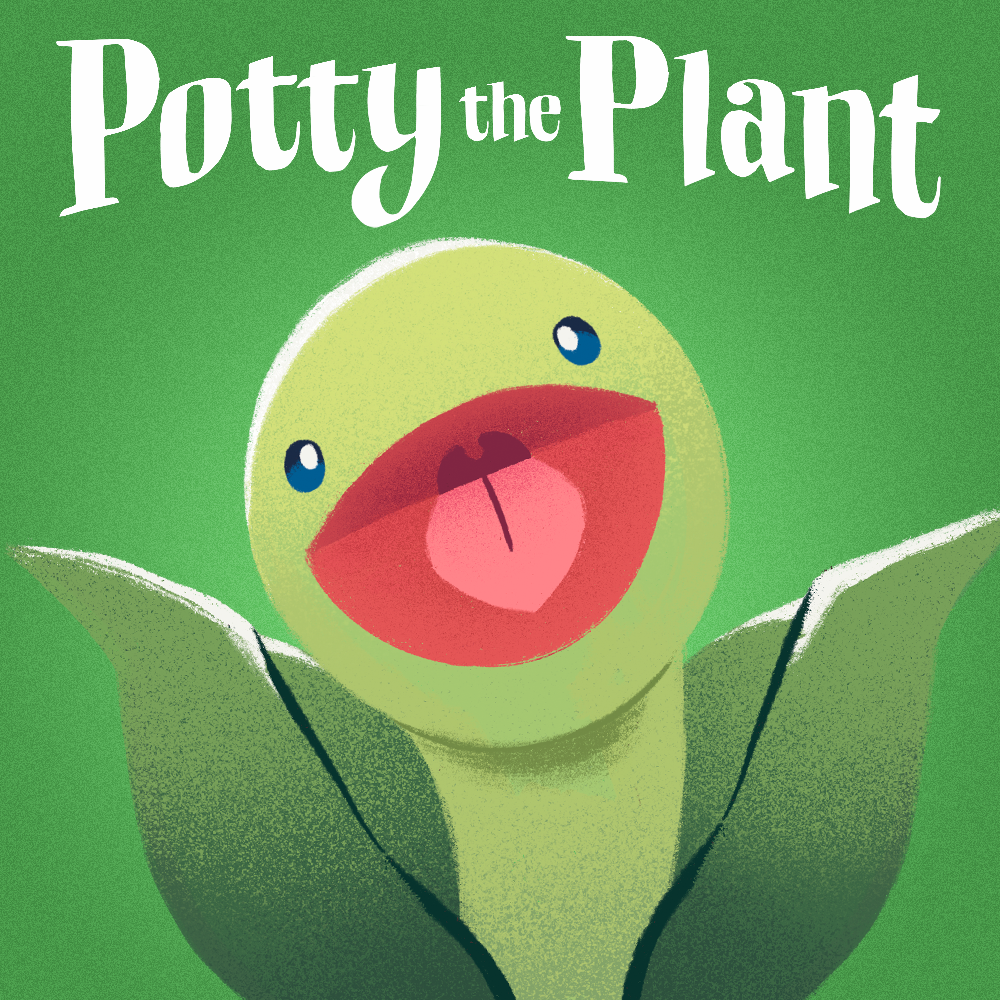
Potty The Plant: A New Dark Musical Comedy

Potty The Plant is an cult adult dark comedy musical based around the character of Potty, a singing tap dancing potted plant.

== History ==
=== Short film ===
Potty The Plant was originally released as a 10-minute long short film in 2017. The short film won The Monkey Bread Tree Film Award for Best Film Score by Baden Burns. The short film was also nominated for Best Ensemble Cast and Best Genre Piece of the Season for 2017.

=== Stage Musical ===
An hour long stage musical version, with added songs and subplots, ran at the Edinburgh Fringe Festival from 2023-2025 , produced by Little Big Stack Theatre Company. The show was also featured for one night at the Durham Fringe Festival with the same cast.

A cast recording was produced with the original cast and released to coincide with the 2024 fringe festival run.

After a sold-out run at the 2024 Edinburgh Fringe Festival, the show had its London Premier at Wiltons Music Hall in June 2025, before returning to the Edinburgh Fringe festival for its third sell-out run.

=== Cast Iterations ===
Character	2023 (Durham Fringe and Edinburgh Fringe Run)	2024 Edinburgh Fringe Run	2025 (Wiltons Music Hall and Edinburgh Fringe Run)
Potty The Pant	Baden Burns	Baden Burns	Baden Burns
Miss Lacey	Sarah Oakland	Sarah Oakland	Lucy Appleton
Dr Acula	Alex Singh	Hudson Tong	Ash K-B
Nurse Dave/ The Moon	Zach Burns	Zach Burns	Joe Winter
Nurse Mel/ Little Timmy	Steph Cubello	Steph Cubello	Steph Cubello
Nurse Stephen/ The Sun	Sam Ridley	Thom Potts	Sam Ridley

==== Production team ====
Book: Baden Jack Burns, Sarah Burns, Aeddan Sussex

Music: Baden Jack Burns

Musical Direction: Zach Burns

== Reception ==
Potty The Plant received 5 stars from Mickey Joe Theatre, the Derek Awards, and Curley Sue. Broadway Baby gave the show 4 Stars, praising the show's "Silly Seriousness". Other 4 star reviews from publications included The Indiependent, Fringe Review, Theatre, Films and Art Reviews and Lost In Theatreland. ThreeWeeks also gave the show 4 stars, writing "It must say something when a musical's irritating, infernally catchy tunes are still with you the day after you've seen it". Theatre and Tonic gave the show 4 stars, stating " If you enjoy “blooming marvellous” warmly fun shows with excellent dark British humour and a pinch of musical chaos then this is the show for you." The Reviews Hub also gave the show 4 stars, calling Potty The Plant "theatrical chaos in the best possible way". Publications such as Culture Calling and others have recommended the show to fans of the Starkid franchise due to its irreverent, off-the-wall style.

Broadway World recommended: "Potty the Plant is the show for people who want an hour of ridiculous, musical fun - led by a slightly unsettling plant! From its beginnings as a short film to this show, Potty the Plant is sure to continue to grow."

== Other Media Appearances ==
The Potty The Plant production team, Little Big Stack, have appeared on Capital Radio, and have sat down multiple times on MusicalTalk - The UK's Independent Musical Theatre Podcast to discuss the writing and creative direction of the show with the podcast's host Thos Ribbits. The team have also spoken about their second musical Fringe: The Musical! on the podcast. Other media appearances include interviews with West End Best Friend, and The Phoenix Remix
