= The SPACE Tour (album) =

Live album by StarKid Productions
- Released: March 13, 2012
- Recorded: November 27, 2011; Gramercy Theatre, New York City
- Genre: Show tunes
- Length: 76:42
- Language: English
- Label: StarKid Productions

StarKid Productions chronology
Starship (2011)	The SPACE Tour (2012)	That's What I Call StarKid! Volume 2 (2012)

The SPACE Tour live album contains the songs from the tour of the same name by StarKid Productions. It was recorded at the tour's last concert at the Gramercy Theatre, New York City on November 27, 2011. The album features live performances of songs from the group's previous productions, and was released digitally on March 13, 2012 through iTunes and Amazon.com. A physical compact disc was later released on March 23, 2012.

== Background ==
The StarKid Precarious Auditory Concert Experience Tour, more commonly abbreviated to The SPACE Tour, was the debut concert tour of StarKid Productions. The tour visited fifteen cities in North America, and consisted of performances of songs from the group's previous productions: Little White Lie, A Very Potter Musical, Me and My Dick, A Very Potter Sequel and Starship.

The seven regular performers for the tour, were occasionally joined by other current or former members of the group. The most notable of which was Darren Criss, who joined the tour for four concerts in Boston and New York City. For the Gramercy Theatre concert, where the album was recorded, there were no guest performers.

The album marks the first time songs referencing Harry Potter have been sold for monetary gain by the group. Previously, songs referencing the series were released for free on the A Very Potter Musical and A Very Potter Sequel soundtrack albums.

Despite being performed on the tour, "It's Over Now" from Little White Lie is not included on the album.

== Track listing ==
All songs written by Darren Criss, except for "Different As Can Be" and "Boy Toy", which are written by A.J. Holmes and Grant Anderson respectively. All songs re-arranged for live performance by Clark Baxtresser.

NB: Tracks which have no featured performers were performed by the entire group.

No.	Title	Featured Performer(s)	Length
1.	"Intro"		3:06
2.	"I Wanna Be" (from Starship)		4:16
3.	"Harry Freakin' Potter" (from A Very Potter Sequel)	Jaime Lyn Beatty, Joey Richter, Dylan Saunders	2:36
4.	"Gettin' Along" (from A Very Potter Sequel)	Dylan Saunders, Joe Walker	2:31
5.	"Ready to Go" (from Me and My Dick)		7:51
6.	"The Coolest Girl" (from A Very Potter Sequel)	Meredith Stepien	3:13
7.	"Granger Danger" (from A Very Potter Musical)	Lauren Lopez, Richter	4:08
8.	"To Have a Home" (from A Very Potter Sequel)	Saunders	3:57
9.	"Stutter" (from A Very Potter Sequel)	Walker	3:10
10.	"Get Back Up" (from Starship)	Lopez, Walker	2:40
11.	"Different As Can Be" (from A Very Potter Musical)	Holden, Walker	3:57
12.	"The Way I Do" (from Starship)	Beatty, Richter, Saunders, Stepien	3:54
13.	"Boy Toy" (from Little White Lie)	Lopez, Stepien	1:40
14.	"Kick It Up a Notch" (from Starship)	Holden, Beatty, Richter, Saunders, Walker	4:59
15.	"No Way" (from A Very Potter Sequel)	Beatty, Lopez, Stepien	2:08
16.	"Status Quo" (from Starship)	Holden, Richter, Saunders, Walker	3:13
17.	"Beauty" (from Starship)		4:33
18.	"Even Though" (from Me and My Dick)	Beatty, Richter	3:11
19.	"Liam's Got a Phone Call"	Holden	1:15
20.	"Days of Summer" (from A Very Potter Sequel)		2:35
21.	"Goin' Back to Hogwarts" (from A Very Potter Musical)		7:47

== Personnel ==
Performers

- Jaime Lyn Beatty
- Brian Holden
- Lauren Lopez
- Joey Richter
- Dylan Saunders
- Meredith Stepien
- Joe Walker

Band

- Charlene Kaye – guitar
- Clark Baxtresser – keyboards
- Mark Swiderski - drums
- Carlos Valdes - bass guitar

== Release history ==
Format	Date
Digital download	March 13, 2012
Compact disc	March 23, 2012

== Chart performance ==
Chart (2012)	Peak position
US Top Current Albums (Billboard)	182
US Independent Albums (Billboard)	39
US Top Cast Albums (Billboard)	2

== Other appearances ==
- All songs on this album are live recordings of previously released tracks.
