= Starry (musical) =

Pop-rock musical

Starry is a pop-rock musical based on the lives of Dutch post-impressionist painter Vincent van Gogh and his brother Theo van Gogh. It has a book written by Kelly Lynne D'Angelo, music by Matt Dahan, and lyrics by both.

== Development ==
The show started development in 2017. Dahan and D'Angelo had previously been working separately on their own musicals about the life of van Gogh, but when they met, they decided to collaborate and combine their outlines. They wrote the story of the show based on the letters Vincent and Theo exchanged, which had been compiled, translated, and published by Johanna van Gogh-Bonger, Theo's wife. Dahan and D'Angelo also looked at historical documents from painters Paul Gauguin and Émile Bernard. The music was created next, followed by the book.

By late 2017 StarKid Productions members Jaime Lyn Beatty, Mariah Rose Faith Casillas, Jeff Blim, and Dylan Saunders had joined the cast.

In the summer of 2018, the musical premiered at Rockwell Table & Stage in Los Angeles, California. The workshop run received positive reviews and sold out many of their shows. In May 2019, the show was performed in concert at Feinstein's/54 Below. The show returned there in February 2020.

In August 2019 a four-person cast (Huck Walton, Amanda Walter, Laura Hartley, and Tim Hein) performed Starry at the Voodoo Rooms and The Liquid Room at the Edinburgh Festival Fringe. In March 2021 Dahan and D'Angelo performed pieces from Starry as part of New York Theatre Barn's New Work Series.

From March 28 to April 7, 2022, the show had a workshop production in the United Kingdom. This was followed by a closed industry performance on April 8. The production was produced by Ameena Hamid, directed by Dean Johnson, and choreographed by Nileeka Bose.

In January 2023 the show had a second London workshop.

The show was scheduled to have its London premiere on the West End in 2023, but has not done so as of April 2026.

== Synopsis ==
=== Act 1 ===
The story open in Montmartre, Paris, France, where Theo van Gogh works as an art dealer and is constantly being asked by artists to publicize their art ("Impress Me"). Meanwhile, Theo's brother Vincent is in town. The two of them discuss their dreams of breaking from the status quo and doing something amazing ("A New Horizon"). Vincent visits Madame Segatori's café, where he meets a group of artists who, despite their constant bickering, have a sense of camaraderie and solidarity ("United in Distaste"). The group shares their art philosophies with Vincent and ask him to share his own.

Meanwhile, Theo meets Jo Bonger and falls head over heels for her ("Something After All"). Jo explains her life philosophy of constantly striving to learn more about the world ("Enlightenment"). Back at the cafe, Paul Gauguin has decided he is fed up with the other artists and decides to strike out on his own ("Where are we Going?"). Vincent continues to work on his own artwork, despite not selling any of his works and other people disliking his style. Jo and Emilé Bernard remind the others that change cannot happen without discomfort, and they say they believe Vincent is on to something ("The Sower"). Jo and Theo have continued to grow closer, and Theo proposes to her. Vincent, meanwhile, is dealing with his own emotions regarding his art and his path in life ("The Road").

=== Act 2 ===
Vincent has moved in with Paul Gauguin in the countryside, and he and Theo continue to write letters to each other ("The Yellow House"). Theo provides Vincent with an allowance to buy art supplies and Vincent sends Theo his finished works. Jo writes Vincent a letter one day, explaining that she and Theo have married and it's going well, and that Theo is proud of his brother and his work ("Sunlight and Storms"). However, Vincent's mental health begins to spiral following a fight with Gauguin ("Threshold of Eternity") and he realizes the only thing that might help him is continuing to paint. Theo writes Vincent, telling him that he has sold his first painting: The Red Vineyard. Theo tells him about his dreams: Vincent moving back to Montmartre and painting Theo's son and him seeing his art inspiring other people ("The Red Vineyard"). Vincent, in a moment of clarity, paints The Starry Night, deciding it will be his legacy ("The Starry Night"). However, Vincent chooses to go out into the wheat fields and shoot himself. Theo travels to him and stays with him until he dies the next day ("Wheat Fields"). After his death, his work becomes recognized due to Jo's efforts, and the show ends with the ensemble declaring "the sight of the starry night makes me free" ("Finale Ultimo").

== Music ==
The show's music was composed by Matt Dahan, with lyrics by both Dahan and D'Angelo.

Several of the show's songs are named after van Gogh's artworks, including The Sower, The Yellow House, The Red Vineyard, The Starry Night, and Wheat Fields. One song, "Where Are We Going?" is named after Paul Gauguin's painting Where Do We Come From? What Are We? Where Are We Going? and is sung by Gauguin.

=== Album ===
The show's concept album was released on January 31, 2020. The album hit #14 on the iTunes pop charts and #42 on the main iTunes charts. In November 2020 the album was re-released with four additional demos not included on the original album.

Track listing:

- "Prologue"
- "Impress Me"
- "A New Horizon"
- "United in Distaste"
- "Something After All"
- "Enlightenment"
- "Where Are We Going?"
- "The Sower"
- "The Road"
- "The Yellow House"
- "Sunlight and Storms"
- "Threshold of Eternity"
- "The Red Vineyard"
- "The Starry Night"
- "Wheat Fields/Finale Ultimo"
- "Take on the World Together (Demo)"
- "Paris at Night (Demo)"
- "Something After All - Original Version (Demo)"

== Cast ==
	Rockwell Table & Stage	Concept Album	2022 UK Workshop	2023 UK Workshop
Vincent van Gogh	Derek Carley, Huck Walton	Dylan Saunders	Jamie Muscato	David Hunter
Theo van Gogh	Matthew Sanderson	Joe Viba	Dean John-Wilson	Carl Spencer
Jo Bonger	Mariah Rose Faith		Maiya Quansah-Breed	Cleopatra Ray
Paul Gauguin	Jeff Blim		Adrian Hansel	
Émile Bernard	Lovlee Carroll	Jaime Lyn Beatty	Milo Mccarthy	Freddie Love
Toulouse-Lautrec	Michael Minto		Aaron Teoh	Nicholas McLean
Agostina Segatori	Natalie Llerena		n/a	Natalie Paris
Edgar Degas	Jenaha McLearn	Natalie Masini	n/a	n/a
Berthe Morisot	Mareena Nicole	Amanda Walter	n/a	n/a
Camille Pissarro	Lennon Hobson	Clayton Snyder	n/a	n/a
