= Jaime Lyn Beatty =

American actress and singer

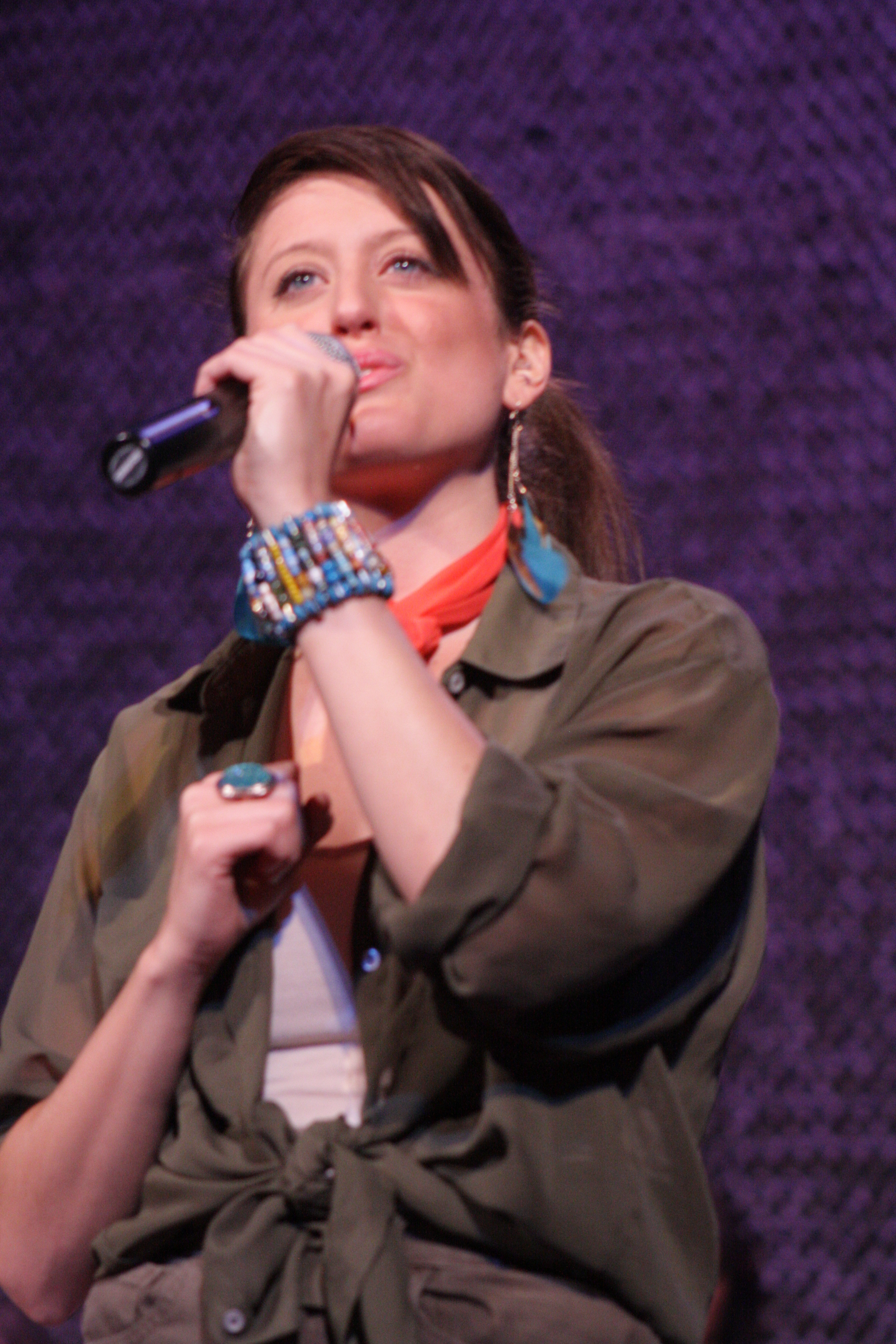
- Beatty in 2012
- Born: New York City, U.S.
- Education: Fiorello H. LaGuardia High School; University of Michigan
- Occupations: Actress; singer

Jaime Lyn Beatty is an American actress and singer, best known for her work in the StarKid Productions musical theater company's shows, starting with their very first production, A Very Potter Musical, and most recently reprising her roles in the 2025 remount and 2026 West End run of The Guy Who Didn't Like Musicals.

== Early life and education ==
Beatty was born and raised in New York City. She graduated from the LaGuardia High School for Performing Arts, after which she attended University of Michigan. She graduated from the university in 2010 with a degree from The School of Music, Theatre & Dance.

== Career ==
Beatty first gained attention in 2009, after performing as Ginny Weasley in A Very Potter Musical, the first show produced by Starkid Productions. The company comprised students and alumni from the University of Michigan. Beatty would continue to appear in Starkid's shows for the next decade, and was a part of their 2011 tour, SPACE, and their 2012 tour, Apocalyptour. In 2015, The Trail to Oregon!, in which Beatty played Daughter, had an off-Broadway run. In 2018, she won the BroadwayWorld Los Angeles Local Featured Actress in a Musical award for her roles in The Guy Who Didn't Like Musicals.

In 2013, Beatty released her debut EP, Dolphin Safe Tunes. In 2020, Beatty appeared in the Starry concept album in the role of Émile Bernard.

In August 2023, Beatty performed at 54 Below in "Musicalized!", a concert based on a TikTok series by Joshua Turchin. The next month, Beatty returned to 54 Below as part of the annual Write Out Loud concert, which highlights pieces created by emerging artists.

== Theatre ==
Year	Show	Type	Role	Ref
2009	A Very Potter Musical	Starkid Productions	Ginny Weasley	
2009	Me and My Dick	Starkid Productions	Sally	
2009	Tartuffe	College	Elmire	
2010	A Very Potter Sequel	Starkid Productions	Rita Skeeter / Ginny Weasley	
2011	Starship	Starkid Productions	Neato Mosquito	
2012	Holy Musical B@man!	Starkid Productions	Candy / Poison Ivy, et al.	
2012	A Very Potter Senior Year	Starkid Productions	Ginny Weasley	
2013	Twisted: The Untold Story of a Royal Vizier	Starkid Productions	Sea Witch / Ensemble	
2014–2015	The Trail to Oregon!	Starkid Productions; Off-Broadway	Daughter	
2016	Firebringer	Starkid Productions	Schwoopsie	
2018	The Guy Who Didn't Like Musicals	Starkid Productions	Charlotte / Nora / Deb, et al.	
2019	Black Friday	Starkid Productions	Sherman Young, et al.	
2020	A VHS Christmas Carol	Starkid Productions	Christmas Past	
2022	Glass Ceilings	Concert performance		
2022	Stranger Sings! The Parody Musical	Off-Broadway	Joyce/Will	
2024	FIVE: The Parody Musical	Off-Broadway	Melania Trump	
2025	The Guy Who Didn't Like Musicals: Reprised!	Starkid Productions	Charlotte / Nora / Deb, et al.	
2026	The Guy Who Didn't Like Musicals: Reprised!	Starkid Productions & Lambert Jackson Productions; West End	Charlotte / Nora / Deb, et al.	

== Awards ==
Year	Award	Category	Show	Result	Ref
2019	BroadwayWorld Los Angeles Awards	Featured Actress in a Musical - Local	The Guy Who Didn't Like Musicals	Won	
2022	BroadwayWorld Los Angeles Awards	Best Cabaret/Concert/Solo Performance	Glass Ceilings	Nominated	
2022	Best of NFMLA Awards	Performance, Comedy	Designated Rider	Nominated	
