= The Guy Who Didn't Like Musicals =

2018 StarKid Productions musical

- Poster
- Music: Jeff Blim
- Lyrics: Jeff Blim
- Book: Nick Lang; Matt Lang
- Premiere: October 11, 2018: Matrix Theater, Los Angeles
- Productions: 2018 Los Angeles; 2025 Los Angeles; 2026 West End

The Guy Who Didn't Like Musicals is a horror comedy musical with music and lyrics by Jeff Blim and a book by Matt and Nick Lang. The show is the first installment in StarKid's Hatchetfield series. Loosely inspired by the 1956 horror film Invasion of the Body Snatchers, it is the 11th stage show produced by StarKid Productions. The show follows Paul, an average guy who "doesn't like musicals," as the citizens of his town are gradually overcome by an alien hive mind that makes them sing and dance as if they are in a musical.

Like other recent StarKid musicals, funding for the show was done through Kickstarter. The project raised US$127,792 through 3,419 backers out of its $60,000 goal. The show ran from October 11, 2018 to November 4, 2018 at the Matrix Theater in Los Angeles, California. A recording of the musical was uploaded to YouTube on December 24, 2018, which has amassed over 9.6 million views as of February 2026. In April 2025, StarKid announced that the show would be restaged as The Guy Who Didn't Like Musicals: Reprised! in July and August 2025, launching a Kickstarter campaign to fund the restaging. In November 2025, a West End transfer of the remounted production was announced for May 14 to 30, 2026. In July 2026, a recording of the 2025 Los Angeles restaged run was posted to YouTube.

== Synopsis ==
=== Act 1 ===
A group of singing "zombie/aliens" addresses the audience, setting the scene in the small town of Hatchetfield and introducing the eponymous "Guy Who Didn't Like Musicals", unremarkable everyman Paul Matthews ("The Guy Who Didn't Like Musicals").

Paul works at an office with his coworkers Bill, Charlotte, and Ted. Bill invites Paul to a production of Mamma Mia! at the local Starlight Theater in downtown Hatchetfield, but Paul declines based on his distaste for musicals. He heads to the local coffee shop, Beanie's, to see Emma Perkins, a barista he has a crush on. As he leaves the shop, Paul is hounded by a Greenpeace advocate about donating to save the planet. During their argument, an approaching storm forces them to take shelter as an explosion can be heard.

The next day, Paul encounters a group of people singing and dancing led by the Greenpeace advocate from the day before ("La Dee Dah Dah Day"). Paul heads to work and Bill recounts that a strange meteor struck the Starlight Theater during the previous night's performance of Mamma Mia!. Their boss, Mr. Davidson, calls Paul into his office, where he sings an "I Want" song at him. ("What Do You Want, Paul?"). Paul rushes to Beanie's and tells Emma that he fears the world is becoming a musical. Emma, unconvinced, is called by her coworkers Nora and Zoey to perform their new Beanie's tip song ("Cup of Roasted Coffee"). Nora and Zoey continue singing and dancing after the song is supposed to end, and the shop's customers join the baristas in song after drinking coffee contaminated with a mysterious blue substance ("Cup of Poisoned Coffee"). Paul and Emma flee the shop and head into an alleyway where they find Paul's coworkers, who tell them that the entire town has started to behave the same way.

Charlotte calls her husband Sam for help, but he has already been infected. Sam and two other police officers attack the group ("Show Me Your Hands") until Ted hits him over the head, knocking him out and exposing his brain, which is bright blue. Emma proposes that they seek help from her eccentric biology teacher Professor Hidgens. They follow her and take the unconscious Sam with them. The group arrives at Hidgens' fortified home on the edge of town. Hidgens believes that the behavior of the townsfolk is the result of an alien invasion brought to Earth by the meteor, and restrains Sam. Hidgens leads Paul, Emma, and Bill to get drinks, leaving Charlotte and Ted with Sam. They argue, and as Ted leaves, Sam wakes up. He convinces Charlotte to untie him with a love song ("You Tied Up My Heart"), then kills and infects her.

Meanwhile, Emma and Paul grow closer, and they discover that Paul's hatred of musicals was inspired by seeing Emma perform in Brigadoon in high school. Emma tells Paul that she hates living in Hatchetfield and left after graduating high school, but returned due to the death of her sister. Their conversation is interrupted when Sam and Charlotte enter and attack the group ("Join Us (And Die)"). Hidgens shoots and kills them both with a shotgun. Bill receives a call from his daughter Alice, saying that she is trapped in the choir room at Hatchetfield High School. Paul goes with Bill to rescue her.

=== Act 2 ===
Paul and Bill search for Alice at Hatchetfield High. They find her and her girlfriend Deb already infected, and Alice tells Bill that she blames him for her death and has always resented him ("Not Your Seed"). The infected group kills Bill, then corners Paul, determined to make him suffer for his defiance. Before they can kill him, the Army arrives and fends off the group, before knocking Paul unconscious. Paul wakes up and is greeted by General John MacNamara, who leads a special unit of the US Army that deals with the strange and paranormal, called PEIP (/ˈpiːp/ PEEP). MacNamara has been ordered to kill any survivors, but tells Paul that if he can rescue Emma, they are both welcome to join PEIP on the rescue helicopter.

Meanwhile, at Hidgens' compound, Hidgens determines that the aliens are a hive mind that communicates through music. Emma theorizes that the meteor acts as the hive's central brain and that destroying it would end the invasion, but Hidgens has decided to embrace the hive's unity as a method to achieve world peace, and so sedates her to avoid her idea getting out. Emma wakes up tied to a chair alongside Ted as Hidgens deactivates his house's defences and reveals his hidden passion for musical theatre. Intending to draw the hive's attention, he performs the opening number of his self-penned musical Workin' Boys, glorifying his college undergrad experience (“Show Stoppin' Number”). The zombies arrive and join in the performance, and Hidgens, caught up in the song, believes them to be his old college friends, allowing them to disembowel and infect him.

Paul arrives to rescue Emma and Ted and they head for the pickup site, but one of the infected attacks Paul. Ted abandons the others and continues to the pickup site alone. There he finds the army waiting, but is shot and assimilated by an infected General MacNamara ("America Is Great Again"). Paul and Emma manage to escape to the helicopter, but the pilot reveals herself to be Zoey, Emma's infected coworker. Zoey attempts to shoot them, but Paul kicks away the gun, causing the helicopter to crash and severely injure Emma. She tells Paul to leave her and destroy the meteor to end the invasion. Paul arms himself with grenades from the helicopter and leaves. Paul enters the collapsed Starlight Theater and is confronted by a group of the infected. They encourage Paul to express his feelings through song. His proximity to the meteor begins to infect him, and he fights for control over the musical virus, eventually managing to pull the pin on a grenade and throw it at the meteor ("Let It Out").

Two weeks later, Emma is recovering in a hospital in Clivesdale and is placed in witness protection with the help of PEIP. She is told there are no other survivors, but she will be escorted to her new life by someone she knows. Paul enters, and the two reunite, before Paul begins to sing, infected by the virus. He and the rest of the infected implore her to join the hive ("Inevitable"). As the cast take their bows at the end of the show, Emma realizes she is trapped on stage in a musical and cannot escape. She cries and begs the audience for help until the cast drag her backstage at the end of the curtain call.

== Roles ==
=== Cast ===
Character	Los Angeles	Los Angeles	West End
Character	2018	2025	2026
Paul Matthews	Jon Matteson	Jon Matteson	Jon Matteson
Emma Perkins, et al.	Lauren Lopez	Lauren Lopez	Lauren Lopez
Ted Spankoffski, et al.	Joey Richter	Joey Richter	Joey Richter
Charlotte Sweetly / Nora / Deb, et al.	Jaime Lyn Beatty	Jaime Lyn Beatty	Jaime Lyn Beatty
Bill Woodward, et al.	Corey Dorris	Corey Dorris	Corey Dorris
Professor Hidgens, et al.	Robert Manion	Will Branner	Iván Fernández González
Alice Woodward / Zoey Chambers, et al.	Mariah Rose Faith Casillas	Mariah Rose Faith Casillas	Mariah Rose Faith Casillas
Sam Sweetly / General MacNamara / Mr. Davidson, et al.	Jeff Blim	Jeff Blim	Jeff Blim

=== Characters ===
- Paul Matthews, a guy who doesn't like musicals and is unsure of what he wants in life. He has a crush on Emma, and frequently visits the coffee shop she works at as an excuse to see her.
- Emma Perkins, a barista who is trying to work her way through community college. She hates Hatchetfield, her job, and musicals.
- Ted Spankoffski, the office asshole. He has been having an affair with Charlotte for some time.
- Charlotte Sweetly, an anxious woman committed to a failing marriage with Sam. She is secretly cheating on Sam with Ted.
- Nora, Emma's boss at Beanie's.
- Bill Woodward, a divorced father trying to connect with his teenage daughter, Alice.
- Alice Woodward, a teenage girl who is caught between her parents' divorce and facing the struggles of growing up.
- Deb, Alice's bad-girl girlfriend.
- Zoey Chambers, a catty college girl who works with Emma. She loves musical theater, and is also having an affair with Sam.
- Professor Henry Hidgens, Emma's biology professor and doomsday survivalist.
- Mr. Ken Davidson, Paul's laidback boss.
- Sam Sweetly, Charlotte's cheating husband, a police officer who is having an affair with Zoey.
- General John MacNamara, a military general who finds Paul and tries to help. He works for PEIP, a secret organization that investigates paranormal, inter-dimensional, and extraterrestrial phenomena.

== Musical numbers ==
Act 1

- "The Guy Who Didn't Like Musicals" – Ensemble
- "La Dee Dah Dah Day" – Greenpeace Girl, Homeless Guy, Ensemble
- "What Do You Want, Paul?" – Mr. Davidson
- "Cup of Roasted Coffee" – Nora, Zoey, Emma
- "Cup of Poisoned Coffee" – Nora, Zoey, Ensemble
- "Show Me Your Hands" – Sam, Cops
- "You Tied up My Heart" – Sam
- "Join Us (And Die)" – Charlotte, Sam

Act 2

- "Not Your Seed" – Alice, Deb, Hatchetfield Bee
- "Show Stoppin Number" – Professor Hidgens, Greg, Stu
- "America Is Great Again" – General MacNamara, Soldiers
- "Let Him Come" – Mr. Davidson, Professor Hidgens, Nora
- "Let It Out" – Paul, Ensemble
- "Inevitable" – Paul, Ensemble

A cast recording was released on December 24, 2018.

== Sequels ==
The Guy Who Didn't Like Musicals served as the first installment in StarKid's horror-comedy series, the Hatchetfield series. A second musical entitled Black Friday was produced and performed by Team StarKid in the fall of 2019. The show takes place in Hatchetfield and features several recurring characters from The Guy Who Didn't Like Musicals. The show ran between October 31 and December 8, 2019, and featured most of the original cast and crew members.

As a result of plans being postponed due to the COVID-19 pandemic, StarKid Productions premiered a series of live-readings as a new installment in the Hatchetfield series named Nightmare Time. The first season of was announced on October 1, 2020 with the entire casts of both The Guy Who Didn't Like Musicals and Black Friday returning. The series featured several returning characters from both series. The first episode of the series was streamed live to YouTube on October 10, 2020 featuring two stories: "The Hatchetfield Ape-Man" and "Watcher World". The final two episodes were performed live on October 17 and October 24, 2020 featuring the stories "Forever & Always," "Time Bastard," "Jane's A Car" and "The Witch in the Web". These episodes were then released on YouTube on February 14, 2021. A second season was announced on October 8, 2021. The series featured 4 episodes with six stories: "Honey Queen," "Perky's Buds," "Abstinence Camp," "Daddy," "Killer Track" and "Yellow Jacket." The entire cast of the original series returned apart from Kendall Nicole and Robert Manion and they were joined by Jae Hughes and Bryce Charles. The episodes were announced to be released weekly on YouTube from May 20, 2022 to June 10, 2022.

A short film titled Workin' Boys was announced in 2019 as a reward for Black Friday's Kickstarter campaign. Production of the film was delayed due to the COVID-19 pandemic, but eventually released in 2023.

A third musical, entitled Nerdy Prudes Must Die was to be performed sometime during 2020, but the COVID-19 pandemic prevented this. In September 2022, it was announced that the musical, written by the Langs and Blim, would be performed in February 2023 at the El Portal Theater in Hollywood. It was released on YouTube on October 13, 2023.

== Awards ==
The Guy Who Didn't Like Musicals received fifteen nominations in twelve categories at the 2019 BroadwayWorld.com Los Angeles Regional Awards, being nominated in every category it was eligible.

Year	Award	Category	Nominee	Result
2019	BroadwayWorld.com Los Angeles Regional Awards	Best Musical - Local		Nominated
2019	BroadwayWorld.com Los Angeles Regional Awards	Best Leading Actor in a Musical - Local	Jon Matteson	Won
2019	BroadwayWorld.com Los Angeles Regional Awards	Best Leading Actress in a Musical - Local	Lauren Lopez	Nominated
2019	BroadwayWorld.com Los Angeles Regional Awards	Best Featured Actor in a Musical - Local	Robert Manion	Won
2019	BroadwayWorld.com Los Angeles Regional Awards	Best Featured Actor in a Musical - Local	Corey Dorris	Nominated
2019	BroadwayWorld.com Los Angeles Regional Awards	Best Featured Actor in a Musical - Local	Joey Richter	Nominated
2019	BroadwayWorld.com Los Angeles Regional Awards	Best Featured Actress in a Musical - Local	Jaime Lyn Beatty	Won
2019	BroadwayWorld.com Los Angeles Regional Awards	Best Featured Actress in a Musical - Local	Mariah Rose Faith	Nominated
2019	BroadwayWorld.com Los Angeles Regional Awards	Best Director of a Musical - Local	Nick Lang	Nominated
2019	BroadwayWorld.com Los Angeles Regional Awards	Best Choreography - Local	James Tolbert	Won
2019	BroadwayWorld.com Los Angeles Regional Awards	Best Musical Director - Local	Matt Dahan	Won
2019	BroadwayWorld.com Los Angeles Regional Awards	Best Scenic Design - Local	Corey Lubowich	Won
2019	BroadwayWorld.com Los Angeles Regional Awards	Best Costume Design - Local	June Saito	Won
2019	BroadwayWorld.com Los Angeles Regional Awards	Best Lighting Design - Local	Sarah Petty	Won
2019	BroadwayWorld.com Los Angeles Regional Awards	Best Sound Design - Local	Ilana Elroi and Brian Rosenthal	Won
