= Kelly Lynne D'Angelo =

American screenwriter, musical artist and cartoonist

Kelly Lynne D'Angelo is a Tuscarora Native American screenwriter, musical artist, cartoonist, and activist.

== Early years ==
From an early age, D'Angelo developed an interest in literature. Around the age of 13, she (Note: D'Angelo uses she/her and they/them pronouns. This article uses she/her for consistency.) committed herself to writing, starting with stage plays in middle school and continuing to explore this form of writing throughout high school. While studying at Syracuse University, she also wrote sketch comedy, a pursuit she began in high school. Further, she had completed two musicals, several television pilots, and a feature film by the time she graduated from Syracuse.

== Career ==
In 2020, she signed a letter as a member of the Committee of Native American and Indigenous Writers of the Writers Guild of America West, openly asking Hollywood to encourage the representation of Native/Indigenous people in film and in television series and programs.

In 2022, she was involved in a controversy within the comic book industry after criticizing the character Matoaka, introduced by writer Jason Aaron in King Conan n°3, inspired by the historical figure of Pocahontas. In the story, Matoaka replicates stereotypical roles associated with Native/Indigenous people, wears an outfit that exposes all of her body, and maintains a relationship with a white man, which can be understood as a comparison with the story of Pocahontas. Eventually, the complaints of D'Angelo and other social media users led Aaron to publish a statement apologizing and donate the money obtained by writing that number.

On August 19, 2024, Disney-owned publisher Marvel Comics announced the publication of the first comic written by D'Angelo. The comic, entitled Kahhori: Reshaper of Worlds, stars the Mohawk superheroine Kahhori, which was originally introduced in the Disney+ webseries What If...?. The comic was published on November 6, 2024, in celebration of the National Month of American Indigenous Heritage. The title was also collaborated on by Native/Indigenous creators Ryan Littles, Arihhonni David, David Cutler and Jim Terry, as well as a cover by Afua Richardson.

As a musical artist, she has served as co-creator of the musical Starry, centered on Holland-living brothers Theo and Vincent Van Gogh.

== Filmography ==
=== As a screenwriter ===
Year	Title	Notes
2017	My Little Pony Equestria Girls: Choose Your Own Ending	2 episodes
2018	Littlest Pet Shop: A World of Our Own	2 episodes
2018	Future Proof	1 episode
2019	Final Space	13 episodes
2019	Mao Mao: Heroes of Pure Heart	5 episodes
2021	Miracle Workers	1 episode
2021–2022	Tig n' Seek	2 episodes
2022	The Chicken Squad	2 episodes
2022	Spirit Rangers	4 episodes
2022-2023	My Little Pony: Make Your Mark	4 episodes
2023	The Twisted Timeline of Sammy & Raj	2 episodes

=== As an actress ===
==== Cinema ====
Year	Title	Role	Notas
2012	Community Service: The Movie	Psychiatric Nurse	Film

==== Television ====
Year	Title	Role	Notes
2018–2019	Vampire: The Masquerade: L.A. by Night	Diane	2 episodes
2021	Rutherford Falls	Kim	1 episode
2022	The Dungeon Run	Handsome	1 episode
2022	The Dungeon Run: Fortune & Fate	Handsome	1 episode

== Works ==
- Lore of Lurue (2021, short story)
- Kahhori: Reshaper of Worlds (2024, Marvel Comics)

== Awards and recognitions ==
- 2019: Writer of the Year at the annual LA Skins Fest gala
- 2021: Included in the list "Top 100 accounts to follow on Twitter in 2021" of BroadwayWorld

== Personal life ==
D'Angelo is a two-spirit person and belongs to the Tuscarora tribe. She goes by the personal pronouns: she/her and they/them. She also has some Italian ancestry.

== Notes ==
1. D'Angelo uses she/her and they/them pronouns. This article uses she/her for consistency.
