= Holy Musical B@man! =

- Holy Musical B@man! soundtrack art
- Music: Nick Gage; Scott Lamps
- Lyrics: Nick Gage
- Book: Matt Lang; Nick Lang
- Setting: Gotham City, Metropolis, Fortress of Solitude
- Basis: Batman
- Premiere: 22 March 2012: Hoover-Leppen Theatre, Chicago
- Productions: 2012 Chicago

Holy Musical B@man! is a musical with music and lyrics by Nick Gage and Scott Lamps, and a book by Matt Lang and Nick Lang.

Holy Musical B@man! is a parody musical based upon DC Universe's Batman comic books, as well as the 1989 film and 2008's The Dark Knight. The name "Holy Musical B@man!" is a reference to the 1960s television series, Batman with Adam West and Burt Ward. Robin (Ward) would often make a pun related to the related conflict by saying "Holy..." which gave inspiration to the play's name. After the brutal murder of his parents, Bruce Wayne commits his life to waging a one-man war on crime. But when he realizes that life isn't fun when you're alone, he sets out to find a super friend.

The musical was performed March 22–25, 2012, at the Hoover-Leppen Theatre in Chicago, Illinois. It was produced by StarKid Productions and directed by Matt Lang. The musical stars an ensemble cast featuring Joe Walker as the Batman and Nick Lang as his sidekick Robin. The group published the musical on YouTube on April 13, 2012.

== Synopsis ==
=== Act 1 ===
The show opens with young billionaire Bruce Wayne witnessing his parents get mugged and shot by a nameless villain. As he grows up, Bruce vows to seek out and destroy evil so that what happened to him will never happen again, deciding to dress up as a giant bat and fight crime as the masked vigilante "Batman" ("Holy Musical B@man!"). Batman is universally loved by the citizens of Gotham City for being a dark and angsty anti-hero. This is despite the fact that Batman irrationally hates them all, holding the people of Gotham responsible for letting his parents die and considering them all (potential) criminals. After a final battle with his nemesis, The Joker, in which the villain falls to his death, Batman partakes in a ceremony to receive the key to the city from Commissioner Gordon, but clashes with Superman, a superhero from Metropolis who constantly upstages Batman. After leaving the ceremony in a huff and arriving home, Batman comes to the realization that he doesn't have any real friends, and fires his loyal butler Alfred after he discovers that he was pretending to be Lucius Fox. Alfred immediately returns disguised as "O'Malley, the Irish butler" and both he and Batman lament ("Dark, Sad, Lonely, Knight"). Superman, also feeling lonely due to his lack of popularity, calls Batman and leaves an apologetic voicemail, inviting him to an upcoming battle with Solomon Grundy that he's trying to organize with other heroes.

The Council of Rogues, a group of Gotham's most famous super-villains - The Penguin, Catwoman, Poison Ivy, Scarecrow, Mr. Freeze and the Riddler - meet to discuss how Batman is foiling all of their crimes ("Rogues Are We"). After a brief interruption from Two-Face, who is promptly refused membership on the council by the other annoyed villains, Sweet Tooth, the newest villain in town, arrives and swiftly seizes control of the Rogues. He then hatches a plan to rouse every villain in Gotham, no matter how lame or derivative, and kill Batman by overwhelming him with sheer numbers ("Rogues Are We (Reprise)"). Batman is crying in his room when Alfred introduces him to a visitor: the orphaned acrobat Dick Grayson. Batman and Dick realize they have a lot in common and quickly strike up a friendship. Bruce reveals his secret identity as Batman, to which Dick reveals that he wishes to become his sidekick, Robin. Together they set out and take on the hordes of new villains plaguing Gotham, both happier than they have ever been. ("Dynamic Duet").

=== Act 2 ===
The citizens of Gotham react badly to Robin, feeling that his wisecracking and light-hearted antics detract from Batman's image as a lone, dark anti-hero ("Robin Sucks"). Meanwhile, Superman grows even more jealous of Batman and his new friendship after no-one showed up to his Solomon Grundy battle. "O'Malley" tells Batman he agrees with Gotham's opinion on Robin and Batman fires him; he returns yet again as "Kwan Lee, the Chinese butler". While rescuing Rachel Dawes, Robin is captured by Sweet Tooth and his new accomplice and lover, Candy, who also take three thousand people hostage in Gotham Square. Sweet Tooth then sets up a Facebook poll, letting the people of Gotham decide whether he kills Robin or poisons the water supply with a lethally-sour Warhead in seven hours. Seeing Batman torn between saving Gotham or Robin, Alfred "returns" and comforts him. Batman, believing that Gotham will choose to sacrifice Robin to save themselves, decides to rescue Robin and let Gotham City suffer the consequences. In response to this, President Barack Obama enlists Superman to defeat Batman before he can rescue Robin and doom the citizens of Gotham ("The American Way").

Batman breaks through Sweet Tooth's barricade around Gotham Square and confronts the supervillain, who flees with Robin. Batman's pursuit is interrupted by Superman, and the two heroes fight each other ("To Be A Man"). Superman dominates the fight until Batman brings out a chunk of Kryptonite, weakening Superman and leaving him lying powerless in the street. Batman corners Sweet Tooth, but the villain attempts to throw Robin into a vat of boiling hot chocolate. Batman saves Robin and lets Sweet Tooth fall into the vat instead, but not before Sweet Tooth activates the Warhead launch and successfully poisons the water supply. Robin is appalled that Batman would leave Gotham City to die, and after checking the Facebook poll, it is revealed that the people of Gotham chose to sacrifice themselves instead of killing Robin.

Realizing that he can believe in the people of Gotham City after all, Batman puts aside his pride and calls on Superman to save the day, mending the rift between them. Superman travels back in time by flying around the world until he reverses the rotation of the Earth, which allows him to intercept the Warhead before it can be deployed and throw it into the Sun. With their new friendship established, Superman and Batman form the Super Friends with various other superheroes ("Super Friends"), including Green Lantern, members of the Justice League and Spider-Man.

== Cast and characters ==
Characters	Chicago (2012)
Batman, et al.	Joe Walker
Superman, et al.	Brian Holden
Alfred Pennyworth / Two-Face, et al.	Chris Allen
Robin / Dick Grayson, et al.	Nick Lang
Sweet Tooth, et al.	Jeff Blim
Scarecrow / The Green Lantern, et al.	Dylan Saunders
Commissioner Gordon, et al.	Lauren Lopez
The Penguin, et al.	Nicholas Joseph Strauss-Matathia
Candy / Poison Ivy, et al.	Jaime Lyn Beatty
Mr. Freeze, et al.	Jim Povolo
Sherlock Holmes, et al.	Nico Ager
Vicki Vale / Evil Mother Goose, et al.	Julia Albain
Catwoman, et al.	Denise Donovan
The Riddler, et al.	Meredith Stepien

== Musical numbers ==
Act I

- "Holy Musical B@man!" – Narrator and Voice
- "Dark, Sad, Lonely, Knight" – Batman, Alfred, Superman, Green Lantern, Ensemble
- "Rogues Are We" – Scarecrow, Poison Ivy, Penguin, Riddler, Mr. Freeze, Catwoman
- "Rogues Are We (Reprise)" – Sweet Tooth, Poison Ivy, Evil Mother Goose, Rogues
- "Dynamic Duet" – Batman, Robin, Ensemble

Act II

- "Robin Sucks!" – Commissioner Gordon, Ensemble
- "The American Way" – Superman, Batman, Sweet Tooth, Two-Face, Civilian, Company
- "To Be A Man" – Batman, Superman, Ensemble
- "Super Friends" – Batman, Green Lantern, Robin, Superman, Spider-Man, Hawkman, Voice, Company

== Productions ==
The musical was performed March 22–25, 2012, at the Hoover-Leppen Theatre in Chicago, Illinois. The group put the entire musical up on YouTube on April 13, 2012.

== Recording ==
A cast recording of the production was released on two separate albums on April 13, 2012, alongside the YouTube premiere of the musical, through Bandcamp. That's What I Call StarKid! contained seven of the nine musical numbers, as well as instrumentals for all nine numbers, and four demo versions performed by Nick Gage. The Holy Musical B@man! soundtrack contained the other two numbers.

== Reviews ==
On Cinema Blend, it was praised for "wacky wordplay, catchy tunes, and good-natured ribbing".

At ComicsAlliance, Chris Sims praised the show, calling it "surprisingly catchy" and that "the love that the creators have for the character is evident."

== See also ==
- List of musicals
