= Nerdy Prudes Must Die =

2023 horror-comedy musical

- Music: Jeff Blim
- Lyrics: Jeff Blim
- Book: Nick Lang; Matt Lang
- Premiere: February 16, 2023: El Portal Theatre, Los Angeles
- Productions: 2023 Los Angeles; 2027 West End

Nerdy Prudes Must Die is a horror comedy musical with music and lyrics by Jeff Blim and a book by Matt and Nick Lang. It is the thirteenth staged show produced by StarKid Productions and is part of the Hatchetfield series, following the musicals The Guy Who Didn't Like Musicals and Black Friday, along with the web series Nightmare Time.

The show ran from February 16, 2023 to February 25, 2023 at the El Portal Theatre in Los Angeles, California, and was directed by Nick Lang. A live recording of the musical was uploaded onto StarKid's YouTube channel on October 13, 2023.

On September 14, 2026, StarKid announced the show would be staged for a limited run on the West End at Apollo Theatre, London in February 2027.

The show's cast album debuted at number 1 on Billboard's Cast Album charts.

Funding for the show was done through Starkid Productions' Starkid Returns BackerKits project, which raised a total of $386,350.

== Synopsis ==
=== Act 1 ===
Two Hatchetfield police officers and Chicago transfer Detective Shapiro investigate the death of Richie Lipschitz, a high school senior who was found drowned in a toilet with his nipples twisted off. They find the phrase "Nerdy prudes must die" written in his blood next to his body. The play cuts to two weeks earlier, where the students of Hatchetfield High School express hatred of their school. The Mayor's daughter Stephanie (Steph) Lauter asks local nerd Peter Spankoffski to help her cheat on a test. Fundamentalist Christian Grace Chasity catches them and tells the teacher. ("High School Is Killing Me")

Later, Peter and the other students lament Max Jägerman, a bully and the quarterback for the school's football team. Max attempts to flirt with Grace, who turns him down, and he vows he will change her mind. ("Literal Monster")

After going home, Steph's father, Solomon Lauter, confiscates her phone and says she can have it back after she improves her grades. Steph asks Peter to help her study. Peter's friends Richie and Ruth overhear the call and urge him to help her. As he goes to meet up with Steph, Peter wonders if he may be cool ("Cool As I Think I Am") only to be attacked by Max, who is angered by his relationship with Steph.

While Grace eats dinner with her family, she becomes flustered and inadvertently makes multiple sexual innuendos. She takes a bath to calm down and ends up fantasizing about Max ("Dirty Girl"). Disgusted with herself, she decides to get revenge on him.

The next day, Richie, Ruth, and Steph find Peter hiding in the bathroom with a black eye. They discuss what to do about Max, when Grace walks in on them and shares her plan to scare him. They lure Max to a purportedly haunted house known as the Waylon Place under the pretense that a party is taking place there ("Bully The Bully"). Peter and Ruth dress up as monsters and scare him, but he overcomes his fears by fighting them. Steph reveals it was a prank, and Max is overjoyed, thinking the group planned to help him. While thanking them, the floor collapses underneath him and he falls. The others find Max injured, and Max, who thinks that they planned for him to get hurt, declares "Nerdy prudes must die!" before dying. Grace convinces the group to bury Max's body under the house's floorboards and hide the evidence ("Bury The Bully").

Two weeks later, the students of Hatchetfield High are happier after Max's disappearance and excited for the upcoming football game against Clivesdale ("Go Go Nighthawks"). In the locker room before the game, Richie is alone and declaring his love for his new school life. Suddenly, Max returns from the grave as a ghost and declares himself to be free before tormenting and killing Richie. ("Nerdy Prudes Must Die").

=== Act 2 ===
Grace's father, a realtor, reveals he has sold the Waylon Place. Afraid that Max's body will be found, Grace informs the others. They are informed of and questioned about Richie's death by two police officers. In the middle of the interrogation, Max's body is found and the officers leave. A curfew is placed on the town as the mayor encourages the residents to suspect each other ("Hatchet Town").

While doing lighting for the school play, Ruth imagines what it would be like to be an actor ("Just For Once"). Max appears again and kills Ruth with a wedgie. Her corpse is found later by Miss Mulberry. Grace attempts to throw the police off their trail by telling them that she saw a van from Clivesdale outside of the Waylon Place on the night of Max's death. Detective Shapiro asks if Grace left her WWJD bracelet in the principal's office after their last meeting. She confirms it is hers, and the detective reveals that they found it in the Waylon Place. Grace steals a gun and flees before she can be arrested.

Peter and Steph meet up at a local coffee shop and argue about recent events, blaming and accusing the other of being in love with them ("If I Loved You"). Grace finds them and tells them that the police are chasing her. When the police arrive, they accidentally target Paul Matthews, allowing Grace, Peter, and Steph to escape. Steph takes the gun away from Grace, and Mayor Lauter finds them.

Solomon takes the children to the Waylon Place and tells them the history of the location. He tells them to use the Black Book, a book containing dark spells, to summon the Lords in Black, the ancient entities that give the book its power. Max appears, having killed Solomon's assistant, and the teens run off. Solomon tries to make a deal with Max, but Max refuses and he kills Solomon offscreen with a shovel. The teens discover the summoning ritual must be performed at one of many Black Altars in the town, one of which is the school. On their way to the school, they are arrested by Detective Shapiro. The teens try to explain the situation to her, but she doesn't believe them until Max appears ahead of them, causing the car to crash, and knocking out Shapiro.

Upon reaching the school, they summon the Lords in Black. The Lords agree to help in return for the thing they cherish most. Their leader, Wiggly, tells Steph to kill Pete with the gun she took from Grace ("The Summoning"). Max appears, and the teens run away.

Peter and Steph are separated from Grace. Peter and Steph realize that they are what each other cherishes most. Peter convinces Steph to shoot and kill him, but Max shows up and stops the bullet ("Cool As I Think I Am (Reprise)"). Max is about to kill Peter and Steph when Grace interrupts, offering to have sex with Max. He accepts, vowing to kill them later. Afterwards, Grace proclaims that she has given up what she cherishes most, her chastity. The Lords in Black reappear and take Max to their realm.

Weeks later, everything has returned to normal, and Peter and Steph attend Homecoming together ("The Best Of You"). When Grace kisses her date, she is disgusted and reveals her plan to kill all "dirty dudes" with the Black Book ("Dirty Dudes Must Die").

== Musical numbers ==
Act 1

- "High School Is Killing Me" – Company
- "Literal Monster" – Pete, Max, Company
- "Cool As I Think I Am" – Pete
- "Dirty Girl" – Max, Grace
- "Bully The Bully" – Grace, Pete, Steph, Ruth, Richie
- "Bury The Bully" – Grace, Pete, Steph, Ruth, Richie
- "Go Go Nighthawks!" – Company
- "Nerdy Prudes Must Die" – Max, Richie, Company

Act 2

- "Hatchet Town" – Company
- "Just For Once" – Ruth
- "If I Loved You" – Pete, Steph
- "The Summoning" – Pete, Steph, Grace, The Lords In Black
- "Cool As I Think I Am (Reprise)" – Pete, Steph
- "The Best Of You" – Pete, Steph, Company
- "Dirty Dudes Must Die" – Grace, Company

== Roles ==
Character	Los Angeles	West End
Character	2023	2027
Peter Spankoffski, Dan Reynolds	Joey Richter	Joey Richter
Stephanie Lauter	Mariah Rose Faith Casillas	Mariah Rose Faith Casillas
Grace Chasity	Angela Giarratana	Angela Giarratana
Max Jägerman, Rudolph	Will Branner	Will Branner
Ruth Fleming, Donna Daggit, Blinky/Bliklotep, Emma Perkins, Brooke	Lauren Lopez	Lauren Lopez
Richie Lipschitz, Wiggly/Wiggog Y'Wrath, Paul Matthews, Boy Jerry, Trevor	Jon Matteson	Jon Matteson
Solomon Lauter, Pokey/Pokotho, Jason Jepson	Corey Dorris	Corey Dorris
Detective Shapiro, Brenda	Bryce Charles	Bryce Charles
Tinky/T'Noy Karaxis, Officer Bailey, Mark Chasity, Kyle Clauger	Curt Mega	Curt Mega
Nibbly/Nibblenephim, Karen Chasity, Miss Tessburger, Miss Mulberry	Kim Whalen	Kim Whalen

== Development ==
Nerdy Prudes Must Die was first mentioned during a live stream on October 11, 2019 and was due to be performed in 2020, but was postponed due to the COVID-19 pandemic. Starkid Productions considered condensing the musical into a shorter story and making it part of the Nightmare Time web series if it was postponed for too long, but this never happened. The show was officially announced on June 10, 2022 and a trailer was posted the next day. A recorded performance was uploaded to Starkid's YouTube channel on October 13, 2023.
