= Apollo Theater Chicago =

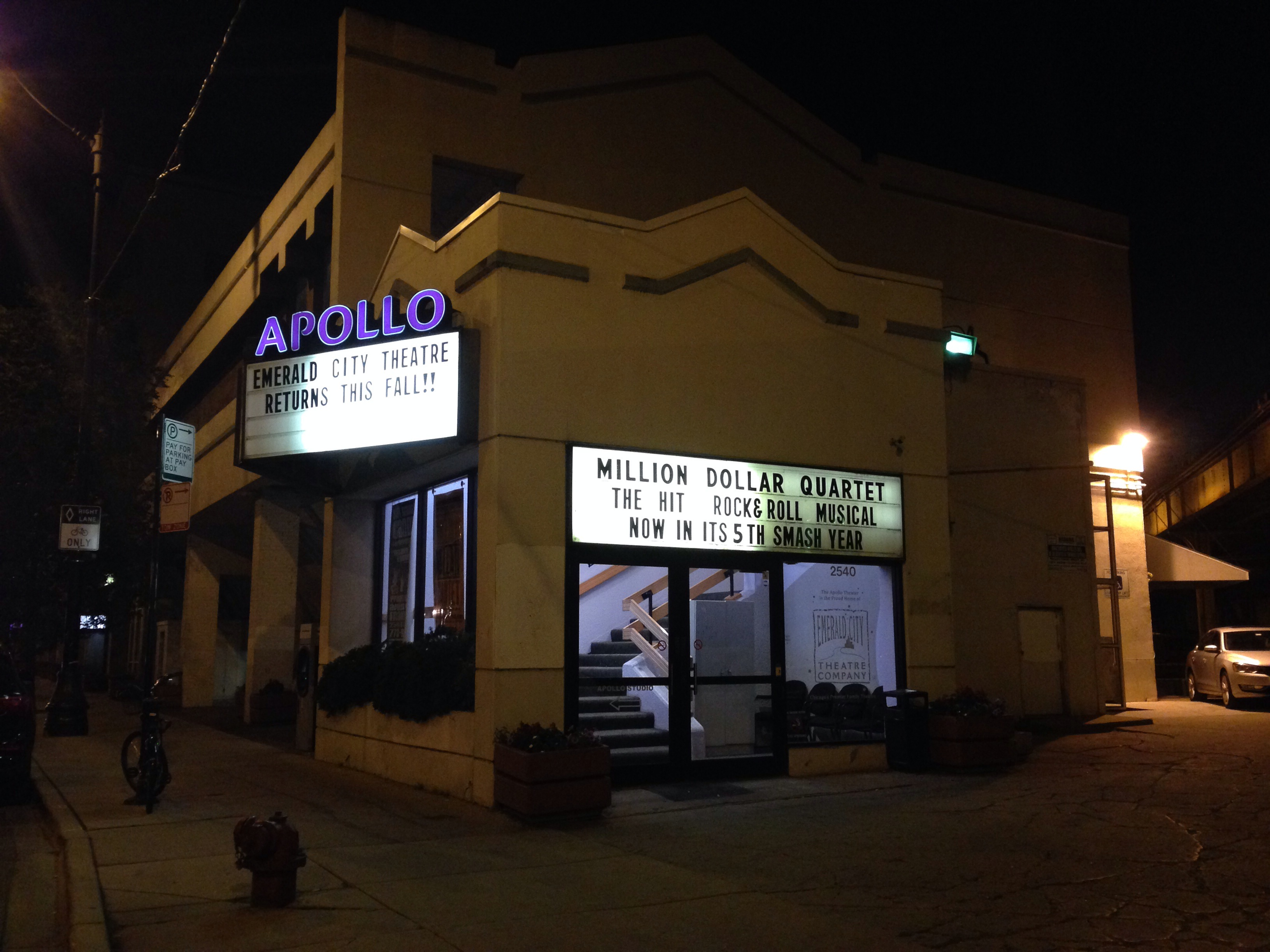
- Interactive map of Apollo Theater Chicago
- Address: 2540 N. Lincoln Ave. Chicago; United States
- Coordinates: 41.9278°N 87.6521°W
- Owner: Rob Kolson Creative Productions
- Capacity: 440
- Production: The Choir of Man

Construction
- Opened: 1978
- Architect: Michael Lustig

Website
- www.apollochicago.com

The Apollo Theater Chicago was built in Chicago's Lincoln Park neighborhood in 1978, by theatre producers Jason Brett and Stuart Oken. Located at 2540 N. Lincoln Ave., the Apollo has 430 seats and a lobby featuring art exhibits and a full bar. The theatre is also the home of the Emerald City Theatre Company. The Apollo Theater Chicago has no relation to the Apollo Theater in New York City.

== History ==
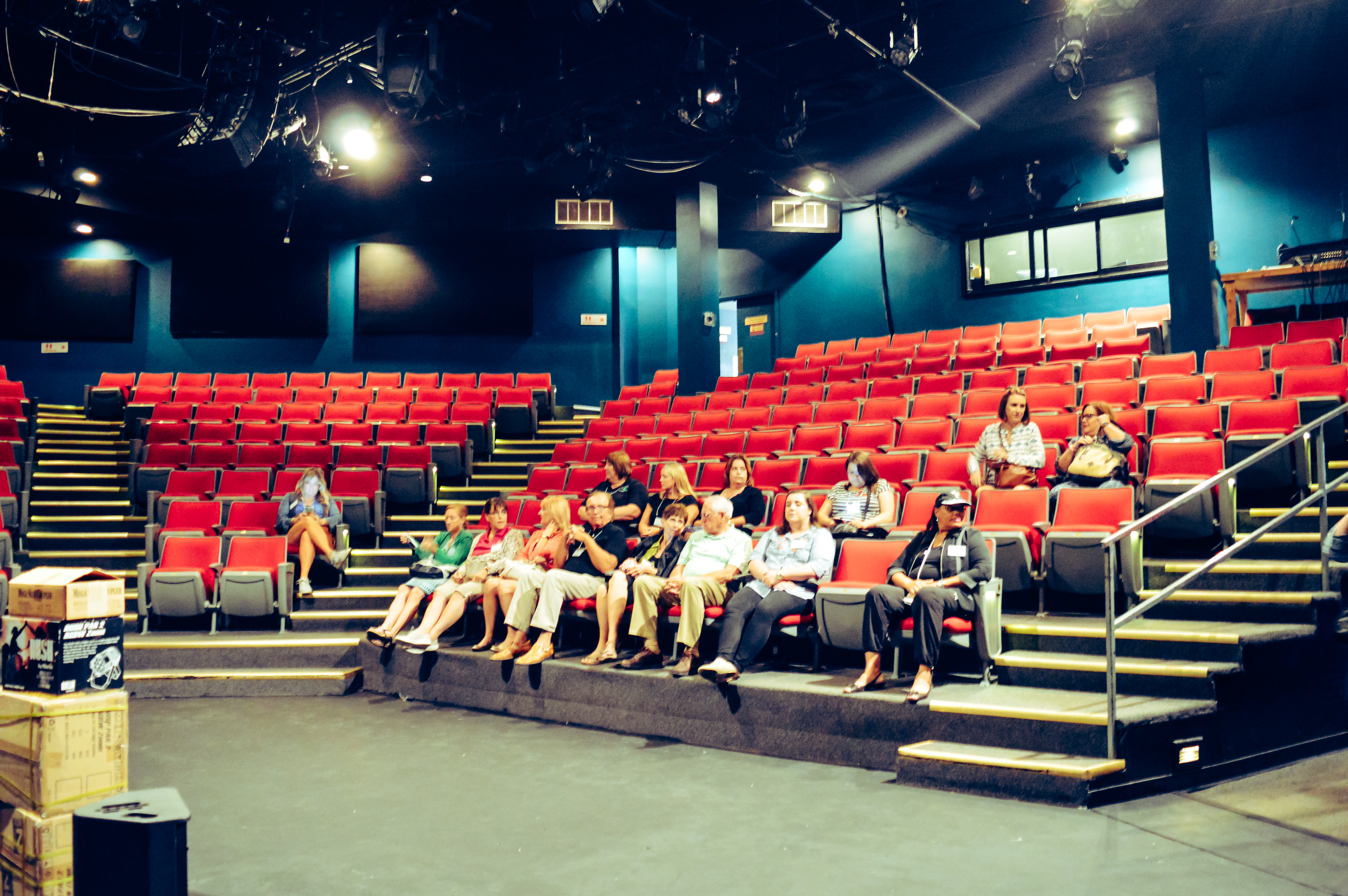
Apollo Theater Chicago comfortably seats 440 guests

The Apollo Theater Chicago is not the first Chicago theater to bear the name Apollo. In 1921, theatrical producer A. H. Woods opened the Apollo Theatre in the Chicago Loop District, at the corner of Randolph and Dearborn Streets. Originally operated as a playhouse, the old Apollo Theatre was sold in 1927 to United Artists Corporation and was renamed the United Artists Theatre. It was demolished in 1989.

In 1991 Michael Leavitt and Fox Theatricals took ownership of the Lincoln Park venue, then in 1996 Rob Kolsen took over.

In 2005, a smaller 50 seat second stage was built, in what was formerly the Act One Bookstore. The smaller venue is popular for comedy, sketch shows, and improv theater.

== Productions ==
Notable productions at the new Apollo included David Mamet's Sexual Perversity in Chicago starring James Belushi, Balm in Gilead with John Malkovich and Gary Sinise, the long running play The Vagina Monologues, and A Nutcracker Christmas written by children's recording artist Ralph Covert and G. Riley Mills. From October 1, 2008, to January 17, 2016, the Musical Million Dollar Quartet played at the venue, making it the longest running Broadway musical in Chicago. The Off-Broadway musical comedy Vape! The Grease Parody opened its Chicago engagement at the Apollo Theater on August 20, 2026. Chris Jones, writing for the Chicago Tribune, called the production "very funny".
