= StarKid Productions =

American musical theatre company

- Founded: 2009
- Founders: Darren Criss; Brian Holden; Matt Lang; Nick Lang
- Type: Theatrical productions
- Affiliations: University of Michigan; Basement Arts
- Website: teamstarkid.com

YouTube information
- Channel: Team StarKid
- Years active: 2009–present
- Genres: Musical theatre; comedy
- Subscribers: 918 thousand
- Views: 369 million
- Last updated: November 14, 2026

StarKid Productions, also known as Team StarKid, is an American musical theatre company founded in 2009 at the University of Michigan by Darren Criss, Brian Holden, Matt Lang, and Nick Lang. Originally known for the viral success of their first musical, A Very Potter Musical, a parody of the Harry Potter series, the troupe primarily produces musical comedies inspired by pop culture, with original scripts, songs, and music. StarKid distributes their musicals for free on YouTube, with projects being funded by crowdfunding and physical ticket sales.

Since the success of A Very Potter Musical, the group has produced fourteen stage musicals (including two Potter sequels), three national tours, two reunion concert specials, two concerts in London, three sketch comedy shows, and three web series.

As of 2023, the company has charted 13 albums in the top 10 on Billboard charts. The cast recording of Me and My Dick debuted at number 11 on the US Cast Albums chart in 2010, becoming the first student-produced musical recording to chart on Billboard. The following year they landed at number one on the same chart with the cast recording of Starship, a feat that has since been repeated with their 2019 musical Black Friday, and their 2023 musical Nerdy Prudes Must Die.

== History ==
StarKid Productions is composed of actors, writers, directors, composers, choreographers, and designers, most of them originating from the University of Michigan's School of Music, Theater and Dance. Many of their early members met while collaborating on plays through Basement Arts, the university's student-run theater organization.

In April 2009, the students staged a musical parody of the Harry Potter series entitled A Very Potter Musical. The video of the play went viral on the Internet, garnering StarKid a worldwide fanbase. Inspired by the viral nature of the video, StarKid Productions was formed, named after a quote from A Very Potter Musical. Later, two sequels were performed and released on YouTube, A Very Potter Sequel in 2010 and A Very Potter Senior Year in 2012.

The Team StarKid YouTube channel was created on June 19, 2009. As of April 2025, the channel has over 850,000 subscribers and over 340 million combined views. Aside from the viral Harry Potter adaptions, Team StarKid has produced a number of other musical theatre parody shows, creating both original stories and pop culture-based parodies of Disney, DC Comics, Star Wars and The Oregon Trail. In recent years, the group has forayed into original content, including their musical Firebringer as well as the Hatchetfield series encompassing both musicals and streamed content beginning with The Guy Who Didn't Like Musicals.

StarKid and its members are associated with various other theater groups, most notably Tin Can Brothers and Shipwrecked Comedy.

Team StarKid has had two major moves since its founding in 2009. The first was to Chicago after the founders graduated from The University of Michigan. The second was to Los Angeles, corresponding with the production of The Guy Who Didn't Like Musicals.

== Members ==
There have been many artists involved with StarKid projects over the years, and it's usual for actors to feature in a few of their productions as opposed to just one.

Among the members who have been part of many of their projects, and can therefore be considered regular collaborators, are Julia Albain (cast, producer, director, tour manager), Chris Allen (cast), Clark Baxtresser (composer, musician, music director), Jaime Lyn Beatty (cast, producers, prop master), Jeff Blim (cast, composer, writer), Mariah Rose Faith Casillas (cast), Darren Criss (cast, composer), Matt Dahan (musician, music director), Denise Donovan (cast, choreographer), Corey Dorris (cast), Nick Gage (musician, composer, cast), Angela Giarratana (cast), Eric Kahn Gale (writer, cast), Brian Holden (cast, writer, director, producer, editor), A. J. Holmes (composer, musician, cast), Matt Lang (writer, director, producer, prop master), Nick Lang (cast, writer, director, producer, editor, prop master), Lauren Lopez (cast, choreographer, director), Corey Lubowich (scenic designer, producer), Jon Matteson (cast), Curt Mega (cast, director), Joe Moses (cast), Sarah Petty (lighting designer), Jim Povolo (cast), Joey Richter (cast), Brian Rosenthal (cast), June Saito (costume designer), Dylan Saunders (cast), Meredith Stepien (cast, composer, musician, writer), Mark Swiderski (sound designer, composer, musician), James Tolbert (choreographer, cast) and Joseph Walker (cast, writer), Kim Whalen (cast).

Several members of Team StarKid have gone on to notable careers in television or theatre. This includes Tony and Emmy Award winner Darren Criss (Glee, The Assassination of Gianni Versace, Maybe Happy Ending), A. J. Holmes (The Book of Mormon), Carlos Valdes (The Flash), Britney Coleman (Tootsie, Beautiful: The Carole King Musical, Company), Mariah Rose Faith Casillas (who went on to play Regina George in the first National Tour of Mean Girls) and musician and comedian Charlene Kaye was also one of Starkid's touring guitarists and opening act.

== Musical theatre productions ==
Production	Dates	Location	Music and lyrics	Book	YouTube publication
A Very Potter Musical	April 9–11, 2009	University of Michigan, Ann Arbor, MI	Darren Criss, A. J. Holmes	Brian Holden, Matt Lang, Nick Lang	July 5, 2009
Me and My Dick	October 29–31, 2009	University of Michigan, Ann Arbor, MI	Darren Criss, A. J. Holmes, Carlos Valdes	Eric Kahn Gale, Brian Holden, Matt Lang, Nick Lang	November 13, 2009
A Very Potter Sequel	May 14–16, 2010	University of Michigan, Ann Arbor, MI	Darren Criss	Brian Holden, Matt Lang, Nick Lang	July 22, 2010
Starship	February 11–23, 2011	Hoover-Leppen Theatre, Chicago, IL	Darren Criss	Brian Holden, Matt Lang, Nick Lang, Joe Walker	April 30, 2011
Holy Musical B@man!	March 22–25, 2012	Hoover-Leppen Theatre, Chicago, IL	Nick Gage, Scott Lamps	Matt Lang, Nick Lang	April 13, 2012
A Very Potter Senior Year	August 11, 2012	LeakyCon, Chicago, IL	Clark Baxtresser, Darren Criss, A. J. Holmes, Pierce Siebers	Brian Holden, Matt Lang, Nick Lang	March 15, 2013
Twisted: The Untold Story of a Royal Vizier	July 4–28, 2013	Greenhouse Theatre, Chicago, IL	A. J. Holmes, Kaley McMahon	Eric Kahn Gale, Matt Lang, Nick Lang	November 27, 2013
Ani: A Parody	July 3 – August 10, 2014	Stage 773, Chicago, IL	Clark Baxtresser, Pierce Siebers	Matt Lang, Nick Lang	October 31, 2014
The Trail to Oregon!	July 3 – August 10, 2014	Stage 773, Chicago, IL	Jeff Blim, Drew De Four	Jeff Blim, Matt Lang, Nick Lang	February 14, 2015
Firebringer	July 6 – August 7, 2016	Stage 773, Chicago, IL	Meredith Stepien, Mark Swiderski	Brian Holden, Matt Lang, Nick Lang, Meredith Stepien	January 1, 2017
The Guy Who Didn't Like Musicals	October 11 – November 4, 2018	The Matrix Theatre, Los Angeles, CA	Jeff Blim	Matt Lang, Nick Lang	December 23, 2018
Black Friday	October 31 – December 8, 2019	Hudson Mainstage Theatre, Los Angeles, CA	Jeff Blim	Matt Lang, Nick Lang	February 29, 2020
Nerdy Prudes Must Die	February 16–25, 2023	El Portal Theater, Los Angeles, CA	Jeff Blim	Matt Lang, Nick Lang	October 13, 2023
VHS Christmas Carols	November 17–19, 2023	Apollo Theater Chicago	Clark Baxtresser	Clark Baxtresser	November 8, 2024
Cinderella's Castle	July 18–21, 25–27, 2024	El Portal Theater, Los Angeles, CA	Jeff Blim	Matt Lang, Nick Lang	April 4, 2025
VHS Christmas Carols	November 21–24, 2024	Apollo Theater Chicago	Clark Baxtresser	Clark Baxtresser	December 12, 2025
The Guy Who Didn't Like Musicals: Reprised!	July–August 2025	El Portal Theater, Los Angeles, CA	Jeff Blim	Matt Lang, Nick Lang	July 4, 2026
The Guy Who Didn't Like Musicals: Reprised!	May 14–30, 2026	Apollo Theatre, London	Jeff Blim	Matt Lang, Nick Lang	TBA
Tomb Quest	July 30–August 23, 2026	The Colony Theatre, Los Angeles, CA	Clark Baxtresser, Eric Kahn Gale	Matt Lang, Eric Kahn Gale	Late 2026

=== A Very Potter Musical (2009) ===
A Very Potter Musical was performed in April 2009 at the University of Michigan. It is based on the Harry Potter series and was released on YouTube on July 5, 2009.

=== Me and My Dick (2009) ===
Me and My Dick was performed in October 2009 at the University of Michigan. The musical was released on YouTube on November 13, 2009.

=== A Very Potter Sequel (2010) ===
A Very Potter Sequel was performed in May 2010 at the University of Michigan. It serves as the sequel to A Very Potter Musical and is also based on the Harry Potter series. It was released on July 22, 2010.

=== Starship (2011) ===
Starship was performed in February 2011 in Chicago. It is inspired by Starship Troopers and The Little Mermaid. It tells the story of Bug, a resident of a planet inhabited by insects, who dreams of becoming a Starship Ranger. However, he is unable to become one because he is not human. Starship was released on YouTube on April 30, 2011.

In 2014, StarKid performed a sequel entitled Starship: Requiem. It was a one-time "theatrical reading" and is thus not included in their musical canon.

=== Holy Musical B@man! (2012) ===
Holy Musical B@man! was performed in March 2012 in Chicago. It is based on Batman and related characters. Holy Musical B@man! was released on YouTube on April 13, 2012.

=== A Very Potter Senior Year (2012) ===
A Very Potter Senior Year was performed in August 2012 in Chicago at LeakyCon. It is based on the Harry Potter series and is the third installment to StarKid's Harry Potter trilogy. This production is a staged reading rather than a full production. A Very Potter Senior Year was released on YouTube on March 15, 2013.

=== Twisted: The Untold Story of a Royal Vizier (2013) ===
Twisted: The Untold Story of a Royal Vizier was performed in July 2013 in Chicago. It is based on the 1992 Disney film Aladdin, the tale of One Thousand and One Nights, as well as the musical Wicked. The story is told from the perspective of Ja'far, who is based on Jafar, the antagonist of the 1992 film. It was released on YouTube on November 27, 2013.

=== Ani: A Parody (2014) ===
Ani: A Parody was performed in 2014 in Chicago and ran concurrently with The Trail to Oregon!. Based on the Star Wars series, the story centers around Anakin Skywalker / Darth Vader. It was released on YouTube on October 31, 2014.

=== The Trail to Oregon! (2014) ===
The Trail to Oregon! was performed in 2014 in Chicago and ran concurrently with Ani: A Parody. It is based on The Oregon Trail video game series. It features the Father, Mother, Daughter, Son, and Grandpa characters in their journey to Oregon. In the show, audience members get to choose the names of the characters as well as decide on the musical's ending. It was released on YouTube on February 14, 2015.

=== Firebringer (2016) ===
Firebringer was performed in 2016 in Chicago. Set in the prehistoric era, the story features Zazzalil, who in pursuit of simplifying everyone's lives comes up with inventions and discovers fire in the process. Firebringer was released on YouTube on January 1, 2017.

=== The Guy Who Didn't Like Musicals (2018) ===
The Guy Who Didn't Like Musicals was performed in 2018 in Los Angeles. It is the first installment of StarKid's Hatchetfield saga. It depicts Paul, the titular "guy who didn't like musicals", and his experiences as the people of Hatchetfield mysteriously start singing and dancing in choreographed musical numbers. The musical was released on YouTube on December 23, 2018.

=== Black Friday (2019) ===
Black Friday was performed in 2019 in Los Angeles. It is the sequel of The Guy Who Didn't Like Musicals and is part of the Hatchetfield saga. In the musical, Black Friday shoppers are overcome with an overwhelming desire to obtain a "Wiggly" doll, to the point of killing anyone who gets in their way. The musical was released on YouTube on February 29, 2020.

=== Nerdy Prudes Must Die (2023) ===
Nerdy Prudes Must Die was performed in February 2023 in Los Angeles. It is the third musical in the Hatchetfield saga. In the musical, a plan by a group of nerds to fight back against a bully backfires when they become haunted by his murderous ghost with a vendetta against "nerdy prudes". It was released on YouTube on October 13, 2023.

=== VHS Christmas Carols (2023/2024) ===
VHS Christmas Carols was originally performed in November 2023. It expands on the 2020 live-streamed production based on A Christmas Carol, adding a first act adapting The Gift of the Magi and The Little Match Girl. Unlike the two previous iterations, this version was directed by James Tolbert. The 2023 musical's pro-shot was released to YouTube on November 8, 2024, for a limited time. It was removed the morning of December 1, 2024, in preparation for the digital ticket release of the 2024 production. In November 2024, an updated production ran at the Apollo Theatre in Chicago again with revised staging.

=== Cinderella's Castle (2024) ===
Cinderella's Castle is a musical based on the tale of Cinderella. It was performed in Los Angeles in late July 2024. The musical is a dark retelling of the classic damsel-in-distress fairy tale with an original 80s-esque "synth-pop" soundtrack, elaborate puppetry, and a cast of 10. It released on YouTube on April 4, 2025.

=== The Guy Who Didn't Like Musicals: Reprised! (2025, 2026) ===
In April 2025, StarKid announced a remount of The Guy Who Didn't Like Musicals. It was performed in Los Angeles from July–August 2025 at the El Portal Theater, with the original cast returning. Robert Manion was replaced by Will Branner, who played Max Jägerman in Nerdy Prudes Must Die. In November 2025, it was announced that the show would make the move to London's West End, at The Apollo Theatre from May 14 to 30, 2026. In April 2026, it was announced that Will Branner would be replaced for London performances by Iván Fernández González, known for originating role of Darius Mark in the world premiere of 13 Going on 30.

=== Tomb Quest (2026) ===
In April 2026, StarKid announced a new original musical named Tomb Quest. The production was written by Matt Lang and Eric Kahn Gale, with music and lyrics by Kahn Gale and Clark Baxtresser. It will be performed from July 30 to August 23, 2026 at the Colony Theatre in Los Angeles, directed by Nick Lang and starring A. J. Holmes, Kim Whalen, Curt Mega, Lauren Lopez, Joey Richter and Corey Dorris. The production is set in a basement, with a group of friends meeting on the night of their recently deceased friend's funeral to fulfil his final wish to complete their abandoned tabletop role-playing game from high school. The musical's proshot will be released on YouTube in late 2026.

== Other performances ==
=== Starship: Requiem (2014) ===
StarKid produced a sequel to their 2011 musical Starship called Starship: Requiem that was performed on August 2, 2014, at LeakyCon in Orlando, FL. However, it was a one-time "theatrical reading" and, as such, Team StarKid does not include it in their musical canon. The story followed the adventures of the android Mega-Girl and her half-witted Starship Ranger husband, Tootsie Noodles, as the newlyweds go to visit Mega-Girl's human-hating family.

=== A VHS Christmas Carol (2020) ===
A VHS Christmas Carol is show is based on A Christmas Carol with the music, lyrics, and book written by Clark Baxstresser. It was directed by Corey Lubowich. A VHS Christmas Carol features songs and an aesthetic inspired by the 1980s. It was streamed via Looped from December 11–13, 2020.

=== VHS Christmas Carol Live! (2021) ===
VHS Christmas Carol Live! is a staged version of the 2020 live-streamed production. Like A VHS Christmas Carol, it was also directed by Corey Lubowich. VHS Christmas Carol Live! was performed from December 9–11, 2021 at The Bourbon Room in Los Angeles and was released on YouTube on November 25, 2022.

=== Workin' Boys (2023) ===
Workin' Boys is a musical short film directed by Nick Lang, with songs by Jeff Blim and a book by Nick Lang & Matt Lang. It is based on the fictional musical mentioned in The Guy Who Didn't Like Musicals. In The Guy Who Didn't Like Musicals, the character of Professor Hidgens pitches his musical, entitled Workin' Boys: A New Musical. The real life Workin' Boys depicts the events leading up to as well as during the staging of his musical. It was livestreamed on October 13, 2023, as part of the Hatchetfield Halloween Party event and was then made available for free to Kickstarter backers of the SK 10niversary event on October 30, 2023. It was released on YouTube on April 27, 2024.

== Concerts and tours ==
=== The SPACE Tour (2011) ===
The SPACE Tour is a North American concert tour with 21 stops in 15 cities. "SPACE" in the tour title stands for StarKid Precarious Auditory Concert Experience.

=== Apocalyptour (2012) ===
Apocalyptour is a North American concert tour with 24 stops in 21 cities. The tour title is a reference to the 2012 phenomenon.

=== A Very StarKid Reunion (2015) ===
A Very StarKid Reunion is a reunion concert performed in celebration of the 100th anniversary of the University of Michigan School of Music, Theater, and Dance.

=== StarKid Homecoming (2019) ===
StarKid Homecoming is a reunion concert held at the Theater at the Ace on July 25–26, 2019.

=== The Jangle Ball Tour (2022) ===
The Jangle Ball Tour is a North American concert tour with 8 stops in 7 cities from December 2 to 17, 2022.

=== It's StarKid, Innit? (2024) ===
It's StarKid, Innit? is a one-night-only concert that took place at the London Palladium on May 12, 2024. It was StarKid's debut performance in the United Kingdom.

=== I Can't Believe It's Been A Little Less Than A Year (2025) ===
I Can't Believe It's Been A Little Less Than A Year were two nights of concerts at the London Palladium on April 26 and 27, 2025.

== Sketch comedy productions ==
=== Airport for Birds (2013) ===
Airport for Birds was performed from January–March 2013 in Chicago, IL. StarKid Productions teamed up with The Second City to produce their first sketch comedy show. The show was produced at the UP Comedy Club.

=== 1Night 2Last 3Ever (2013) ===
1Night 2Last 3Ever was performed from September–November 2013 in Chicago, IL. StarKid Productions second sketch comedy show with The Second City. The show was produced at the UP Comedy Club. The show was a parody of various pieces of 1990s pop culture centering on the exploits of a fictional boy band, 3Ever.

=== Yes, I am Afraid of the Dark! (2015) ===
Yes, I am Afraid of the Dark! was performed from September–October 2015 in Chicago, IL. StarKid Productions first improv comedy show with iO Chicago and was produced at the iO Theater. The show was a parody of the 1990s children show Are You Afraid of the Dark? with the cast creating an entire episode based on audience suggestion.

== Web series ==
=== Little White Lie ===
In 2007, members including Matt Lang, Nick Lang, Eric Kahn Gale, Brian Holden, Darren Criss, Lauren Lopez, Elona Love (née Finlay), Chris Allen, Meredith Stepien, and Jim Povolo produced an online video series called Little White Lie. It was released in 2009 on StarKid's YouTube channel.

Despite the series ending in a cliffhanger, StarKid members have confirmed at various events that there will be no season 2, as it was an expensive production and the actors who took part in it are scattered all over the country. However, Eric Kahn Gale, one of the writers for the show, stated that he would write and publish a synopsis of season 2, which was released on September 3, 2013, on his Tumblr page.

=== Movies, Musicals, and Me ===
In October 2017, StarKid debuted its second web series on YouTube, Movies, Musicals, and Me. The series takes place in an alternate world where every popular movie ever has been adapted into a Broadway musical. The best of these musicals all star the same man, Halpert Evans, a vain and pompous, though brilliant, actor. The series is structured as a mockumentary of Evans, chronicling the most significant musical roles of his career, along with commentary from various colleagues in Halpert's line of work. The series introduces StarKid newcomers Esther Fallick as Halpert Evans and Mary Kate Wiles as Judy Davendale. Joey Richter, Nick Lang, Brian Holden, Dylan Saunders, Lauren Lopez, Jaime Lyn Beatty, Corey Dorris, and Clark Baxtresser also star.

=== Nightmare Time ===
On October 1, 2020, StarKid announced a new three-episode horror anthology series set in the world of The Guy Who Didn't Like Musicals and Black Friday. It featured six stories read by the cast of the shows. Performances took place virtually on October 10, 17 and 24, 2020. In August 2021, a second season was announced. A cast recording was released on February 8, 2021.

The next year, StarKid later livestreamed Nightmare Time 2, the second season of the series. Four performances took place virtually on October 23 and 30 and on November 6 and 13, 2021. The entire cast from the first season returned with the exceptions of Robert Manion and Kendall Nicole. The series was also the StarKid debut of Bryce Charles and Jae Hughes. The episodes were released weekly on StarKid's YouTube channel between May 20, 2022, and June 10, 2022.

== Soundtrack albums ==
Title	Album details	Peak chart positions					Notes
Title	Album details	US	US Cast	US Comedy	US Comp.	US Indie	Notes
Little White Lie	Released: June 30, 2009; Formats: Download	—	—	—	—	—	
A Very Potter Musical	Released: September 9, 2009; Formats: Download	—	—	—	—	—	Made only available for free on Bandcamp, therefore not eligible for Billboard chart listings.
Me and My Dick (A New Musical)	Released: January 6, 2010; Formats: Download	—	11	—	—	—	
A Very StarKid Album	Released: July 22, 2010; Formats: Download	—	—	—	18	—	
A Very Potter Sequel	Released: July 31, 2010; Formats: Download	—	—	—	—	—	Made only available for free on Bandcamp, therefore not eligible for Billboard chart listings.
Starship (Original Soundtrack)	Released: April 30, 2011; Formats: Download, Compact disc	134	1	—	—	25	
The SPACE Tour	Released: March 13, 2012; Formats: Download, Compact disc	— (Note: "The SPACE Tour" did not enter the Billboard 200 but did enter the Top Current Albums component chart at number 182)	2	—	—	39	
That's What I Call StarKid!, Vol. 2	Released: April 13, 2012; Formats: Download	—	12	—	24	—	
Holy Musical B@man!	Released: April 13, 2012; Formats: Download	—	—	—	—	—	Made only available for free on Bandcamp, therefore not eligible for Billboard chart listings.
Apocalyptour: Live Album	Released: October 2, 2012; Formats: Download, Compact disc	—	3	—	—	—	
A Very StarKid Senior Year (A Very Potter Senior Year)	Released: December 15, 2012; Formats: Download	—	—	—	—	—	Made only available via the official StarKid store, therefore not eligible for Billboard chart listings.
Twisted (Original Chicago Cast Recording)	Released: November 28, 2013; Formats: Download	—	12	—	—	—	
Twisted: Twisted	Released: December 4, 2013; Formats: Download	—	—	—	—	—	A remix album featuring reworked versions songs from the musical Twisted as well as original demos.
Ani: A Parody	Released: October 31, 2014; Formats: Download	—	13	4	—	—	
The Trail to Oregon!	Released: February 13, 2015; Formats: Download	—	10	—	—	—	
Firebringer (Original Cast Recording)	Released: November 22, 2016; Formats: Download	—	10	—	—	—	
The Guy Who Didn't Like Musicals	Released: December 24, 2018; Formats: Download	—	6	—	—	—	
StarKid Homecoming: Vol. 1 (Live)	Released: December 18, 2019; Formats: Download	—	—	—	—	—	
StarKid Homecoming: Vol. 2 (Live)	Released: December 18, 2019; Formats: Download	—	—	—	—	—	
Black Friday	Released: February 28, 2020; Formats: Download	— (Note: "Black Friday" did not enter the Billboard 200 but did enter the Top Album Sales component chart at number 58.)	1	—	—	—	
A VHS Christmas Carol	Released: December 14, 2020; Formats: Download	—	—	—	—	—	
Nightmare Time	Released: February 8, 2021; Formats: Download	—	2	—	—	—	
Nightmare Time 2, Vol. 1	Released: October 23, 2021; Formats: Download	—	8	—	—	—	
Nightmare Time 2, Vol. 2	Released: October 30, 2021; Formats: Download	—	10	—	—	—	
Nightmare Time 2, Vol. 3	Released: November 6, 2021; Formats: Download	—	9	—	—	—	
Nightmare Time 2, Vol. 4	Released: November 13, 2021; Formats: Download	—	7	—	—	—	
Nerdy Prudes Must Die	Released: September 15, 2023; Formats: Download	—	1	—	—		
