= Me and My Dick =

Musical by StarKid productions

- MAMD soundtrack art
- Music: A.J. Holmes; Carlos Valdes; Darren Criss
- Lyrics: A.J. Holmes; Carlos Valdes; Darren Criss
- Book: Matt Lang; Nick Lang; Brian Holden; Eric Kahn Gale
- Productions: 2009 University of Michigan

Me and My Dick is a musical with music and lyrics by A.J. Holmes, Carlos Valdes, and Darren Criss, and a book by Matt Lang, Nick Lang, Brian Holden and Eric Kahn Gale.

Me and My Dick is a coming of age tale about a "boy with a very special relationship with his very best friend ... his Dick! Together they face the trials of growing up, love, sex and high school, but these two best pals are in for the adventure of a lifetime."

The musical was performed October 29–31, 2009, on the University of Michigan campus. It was produced by StarKid Productions and the University of Michigan's Basement Arts, and was directed by Matt Lang. The musical stars an ensemble cast featuring Joey Richter as a fictionalized version of himself, Joe Walker as his dick named Dick, Jaime Lyn Beatty as Sally, and Devin Lytle as Sally's vagina, Miss Cooter. The group put the entire musical up on YouTube November 13, 2009.

The musical's cast recording became the first ever student musical to place on the Billboard 200 charts, peaking at No. 11 for Billboard's Top Cast Albums.

== Synopsis ==
=== Act I ===
Joey Richter wakes up one morning and begins talking to his best friend, his penis, Dick, about their non-existent sex life. This includes talking about Joey's crush on a particularly attractive and popular girl named Vanessa. This gets Dick excited but Joey says there isn't time for masturbation because they'll be late for school, but Dick counters by saying it will hurt if he doesn't. Joey and Dick begin masturbating, imagining an encounter with Vanessa. Suddenly, Joey's plain-looking neighbor Sally calls through Joey's window asking if he is ready for school. Due to this interruption, Joey and Dick can't finish. Dick then tries to talk Joey into "introducing" him to Vanessa and talks him into "taking life by the balls," in order to win Vanessa's heart and get Joey to lose his virginity ("Me and My Dick").

While waiting to walk to school with Joey, Sally begins talking to her vagina, Miss Cooter, who is equally upset with their sexual situation. Sally chalks it up to being "an ugly duckling that became an ugly duck." Miss Cooter advises her to not be afraid to go after what she wants. Sally decides to ask Joey out, but ends up just asking him to be chemistry partners, which he agrees to. While Sally is explaining their science project, Joey and Dick plan to get Vanessa's attention but get sidetracked when they see Vanessa. Vanessa meets up with her friend Tiffany as do their vaginas, The Old Snatch (Tiffany's) and Flopsy (Vanessa's). They discuss boys, as well as monogamy, since Flopsy is tired of always having sex with Vanessa's boyfriend and the Old Snatch is used to having casual sex with almost any boy Tiffany meets. Both are ready for a break. Vanessa reveals to Tiffany that her boyfriend Rick cheated on her. Tiffany then talks Vanessa into hooking up with a loser to get back at Rick, in this case, Joey ("Ready to Go").

Sally attempts to ask out Joey again, but she is interrupted by Tiffany pairing Vanessa and Joey together for the chemistry project, which Joey eagerly accepts. Joey thanks Sally for letting him pair with Vanessa and hugs her. In the midst of the hug, Dick and Miss Cooter meet and fall in love ("I've Seen You Around Here Before").

Tiffany arrives at Vanessa's to give her a box of "tools" in case her study date with Joey turns into an "epic fail," including handcuffs, beer, and condoms. Vanessa and Flopsy argue over whether having sex with Joey is right, but Vanessa convinces Flopsy that it is important to her. Meanwhile, Dick explains to Joey that while he and Sally hugged, Dick met Miss Cooter. Dick explains his feelings for Miss Cooter, but Joey changes Dick's mind by making him think of how great Vanessa's vagina will be.

As Sally encounters difficulties working on the science project with Tiffany, the Old Snatch tries to convince Miss Cooter to not be in love with a dick ("Nothin' Like a Dick"). Miss Cooter tells the Old Snatch that she is in love with Joey's dick, and the Old Snatch reveals that Joey and Vanessa are planning to have sex together. Miss Cooter refuses to believe this, insisting that Dick loves only her. Tiffany similarly breaks the news to Sally, and Sally storms off, distraught.

Joey goes to Vanessa's house, and Vanessa and Joey begin drinking to try to ease the tension. Vanessa then tries several different ways to show Joey she's interested in him, but Dick tells him to play it cool, so he shrugs off her advances. However, when Vanessa flat out says she wants to have sex with him, he becomes willing. As Joey and Vanessa become physically romantic, Dick meets Flopsy but is repulsed by her and does not have the same romantic experience he had with Miss Cooter. Because of this, Joey and Dick experience erectile dysfunction, which leads Vanessa to throw them out of her house.

Joey is so frustrated that he wishes he did not have a dick, and during a struggle, Dick comes off of Joey and runs away to find Miss Cooter. In shock of losing his penis, Joey is visited by his heart, who has been ignored ever since Joey and Dick became friends. Joey's heart tells Joey that everything he's been doing with Vanessa is wrong, explaining that girls want love, and not just sex ("Listen to Your Heart").

=== Act II ===
Dick becomes lost while searching for Miss Cooter, but he meets two abandoned penises, Big T and Weenie. These two are initially rough with Dick, but they decide to help him. Big T and Weenie reveal to Dick there are actually many "lost dicks". They bring him to the Land of the Dicks.

Vanessa tells Tiffany what happened with Joey. Joey arrives shortly thereafter to (with the help of his heart) win Vanessa's love. Vanessa quickly dismisses Joey's advances, and Joey runs off, crying. Tiffany lets slip what happened between Joey and Vanessa. The Old Snatch realizes that Joey was acting differently, as if he didn't have a dick. Meanwhile, Big T and Weenie realize that Dick isn't adapting well to his new home, but talk him into living as a "free" dick and not to be so fixated on "getting pussy." Relieved to be "off pussy time," Dick reveals that he left Joey, as opposed to the other dicks who had been thrown away. Big T and Weenie see this as an opportunity to find a new home: Joey.

Joey and his heart are licking their wounds after their failed marriage proposal to Vanessa, but Joey's heart decides the only way to keep their dignity is for the two of them to commit suicide. Sally shows up to console Joey and Miss Cooter convinces her to confess her feelings of love to Joey. Sally does, much to Joey's shock. Sally attempts to leave but before Sally can, Joey calls after her and asks her to stay. He and his heart realize that Sally is "the one" for them. Sally introduces Joey and his heart to her own heart, with whom Joey's heart immediately falls in love. Joey and Sally finally come together, sharing a passionate kiss ("Even Though"). Sally then introduces Joey to Miss Cooter, but when it is Joey's turn to introduce Dick, Joey says that he can't be with Sally, causing Sally, Miss Cooter, and Sally's heart to leave crying. Joey's heart then convinces Joey that he has to find Dick in order to be with Sally and be happy ("Gotta Find His Dick").

Sally's heart is demanding Sally drown her sorrows in ice cream. Meanwhile, Miss Cooter tries to figure out what was wrong with Joey before being visited by the Old Snatch, who wants to take her to meet the Council of the Pussies ("The Council of the Pussies"). The Old Snatch asks the Council of the Pussies to help find and return Dick to Joey, stating that Dick and Miss Cooter are in love. Flopsy disputes this saying that dicks cannot love. Miss Cooter manages to convince the Council that love between genitalia does exist, and they agree to help her. The Old Snatch volunteers to lead the pussies to the Land of the Lost Dicks ("Flight of the Pussies").

Joey is having trouble finding Dick and passes out. He is later awakened by the Lost Dicks, who at first give him hospitality, but when Joey starts asking questions about Dick, they quickly stand back to draw attention to Big T. Big T welcomes Joey to the Land of Lost Dicks and claims "there are plenty of dicks to choose from," and tries to talk Joey into taking him as his dick instead of Dick. Dick arrives, and Joey tells him that he came to bring him home. Big T continues to try and convince Joey to take him, bad-mouthing Dick in the process ("Big T's Temptation"). Despite this, Joey chooses Dick, and tells Dick he was right about Sally and Miss Cooter all along ("Me and My Dick (Reprise)"). The Lost Dicks aren't happy about this, and take Dick away. Big T stands up for Dick and Joey, but Weenie sees this as Big T growing soft, and takes over as leader of the Lost Dicks. Just before Weenie can attach himself to Joey, the Council of the Pussies arrive to save him. Weenie is then picked up by a bird (the same bird who once tried to eat him after he was abandoned) and flown away. Joey and Dick are reunited, and Joey introduces Dick to his heart, stating that love and sex should be a team effort between them. The group meets up with Miss Cooter and the Old Snatch, who told Joey not to tell anyone of the world of walking, talking genitalia, which he accepts. Flopsy takes Joey, Dick, and Joey's heart home, and Dick and Miss Cooter promise to meet again. At this point, Miss Cooter prepares to leave, but the Old Snatch reveals that she isn't going back to Tiffany, as she plans to see the world. She then runs into Big T, who was her first dick. She is still mad at him for running out on her. Big T reveals that he did love her, but his master abandoned him before he could find her. (Suggesting that Tiffany was the inspiration for Big T's master to get a sex change). The two reconcile their differences and decide to travel to Venice together.

Miss Cooter returns to Sally, and then she, Miss Cooter, and Sally's heart are visited by Joey, Dick, and his heart. Joey tells Sally he loves her, and the two decide to culminate their feelings by finally having sex. Meanwhile, Vanessa is envious of their new-found love, but gets back together with Rick, who says the rumors of him cheating on her were false. Flopsy and Rick's Dick are reunited, the Old Snatch and Big T are happily seeing the world together, and Weenie finds a new home as the dick of the now-vagina-less Tiffany ("Finale").

== Cast and characters ==
Actor/Actress	Character
Joey Richter	Joey Richter
Joe Walker	Dick
Jaime Lyn Beatty	Sally
Devin Lytle	Miss Cooter
Ali Gordon	Vanessa
Alle-Faye Monka	Tiffany
Nicholas Joseph Strauss-Matathia	The Old Snatch
Brian Holden	Flopsy
A.J. Holmes	Joey's Heart
Corey Dorris	Big T
Arielle Goldman	Weenie
Lily Marks	Sally's Heart; High Council Pussy
Richard Campbell	Rick; The Kid That Hates Joey
Joe Moses	Rick's Dick

== Musical numbers ==
Act I

- "Me and My Dick" – Joey, Dick
- "Ready to Go" – Sally, Miss Cooter, Joey, Dick, Vanessa, Tiffany, The Old Snatch, Flopsy, Students
- "I've Seen You Around Here Before" – Dick, Miss Cooter
- "Nothin' Like a Dick" – The Old Snatch, Miss Cooter
- "Listen to Your Heart" – Joey's Heart, Joey

Act II

- "Land of the Dicks" – Weenie, Big T, The Lost Dicks
- "Even Though" – Joey, Sally, Company
- "Gotta Find His Dick" – Joey's Heart, Company
- "The Council of the Pussies" – The Old Snatch, High Council Pussy, The Council of the Pussies
- "Flight of the Pussies" – The Old Snatch, The Council of the Pussies
- "Big T's Temptation" – Big T, The Lost Dicks
- "Me and My Dick" (Reprise)^ – Joey, Dick
- "Me and My Dick" (Reprise #2)^ – The Old Snatch
- "Finale" – Joey, Sally, Miss Cooter, Dick, Joey's Heart, Company

- Alternate versions of "Ready to Go" and "Even Though," performed by Darren Criss are played during the credits of the YouTube version as well as appearing on the soundtrack album.
- ^Not on Cast Recording

== Development ==
The musical has its origins in The Penis Play, a short play written by A.J. Holmes and Matt Lang as part of the University of Michigan's Basement Arts 24 Hour Theater festival, where teams of writers, directors, and actors are challenged to create a show in a day. After the success of Starkid's A Very Potter Musical, the pair collaborated with Lang's brother Nick, Brian Holden, Eric Kahn Gale and Darren Criss to expand the show into a full two-act musical, to serve as Starkid's second production.

== Productions ==
Me and My Dick was performed October 29–31, 2009, on the University of Michigan campus. The musical was posted on YouTube in its entirety November 13, 2009.

== Recording ==
A cast recording of the production was released January 6, 2010, digitally through iTunes. All of the songs featured on stage are present on the recording, except for the short reprises of "Me and My Dick" performed by Joey Richter and The Old Snatch in Act II. Also, on the iTunes track listing, "Nothin' Like a Dick" is listed as "There Ain't Nothing Like a Dick" and "Heaven on Earth" is listed simply as "Finale," probably because, as in the musical, in addition to the original song, it also includes reprises of "Even Though" and "Me and My Dick."

The album became the first ever student musical to place on the Billboard 200 charts, peaking at No. 11 for Billboard's Top Cast Albums.

== See also ==
- Lists of musicals
