= Starship (musical) =

- Starship soundtrack art
- Music: Darren Criss
- Lyrics: Darren Criss
- Book: Matt Lang; Nick Lang; Brian Holden; Joe Walker
- Basis: Starship Troopers and The Little Mermaid
- Productions: 2011 Chicago

Starship is a musical with music and lyrics by Darren Criss, and a book by Matt Lang, Nick Lang, Brian Holden, and Joe Walker.

Starship is about an alien planet inhabited by giant insects, called Bug-World. One of these insects, named Bug, comes across a crashed human starship and becomes infatuated with the idea of becoming a Starship Ranger, and he gets his chance when a group of humans land on Bug-World in an attempt to colonize the planet.

The musical was performed February 11-23rd, 2011, at the Hoover-Leppen Theatre in Chicago, Illinois (this was the first StarKid stage production to not be performed on the University of Michigan campus). It was produced by StarKid Productions and directed by Matt Lang. The musical stars an ensemble cast featuring Joey Richter as the lead, Bug. The group put the entire musical up on YouTube on April 30, 2011. The musical's cast recording debuted at No. 134 on the Billboard 200 and No. 1 for Top Cast Albums.

An audio-only sequel, Starship: Requiem, was included as a perk for fans who contributed to Firebringer's funding and was intended to be released on Christmas of 2016 but was delayed until February 2018.

== Synopsis ==
=== Act I ===
Bug, an alien insect from the planet Bug-World, is watching a video about "Starship Rangers" in a crashed starship he has found and longs to be like the humans he sees on the screen. His friend Roach comes to find him for the job assigning ceremony and voices his dislike for Bug's constant talk of Starship Rangers. Bug seems certain that he is not like everyone else and that he is destined for greater things than a typical bug job ("I Wanna Be"). Shortly after, Bug runs into Bugette, a caterpillar assigned with carrying an egg sac until it hatches. It is clear she is romantically interested in Bug, but he rebuffs her advances. When the time comes for the bugs to be assigned a job by the Overqueen, Roach is given the prestigious job of "Queen Impregnator", while Bug is stuck with being an "egg planter."

Suddenly, a starship arrives on Bug-World, and Starship Ranger February of the Galactic League of Extraterrestrial Exploration (G.L.E.E.) touches down on the planet's surface. February is beautiful but dim and is desperate to prove herself as a true Starship Ranger. She meets what she believes to be the planet's indigenous life, but she is chased by the Mosquito siblings and captured by some of the hive's "mammal wranglers."

The Starship Rangers remaining on the ship, including formerly tough Commander Up, second-in-command tomboy Taz, brainy Specs, mellow Krayonder, and the sweet and simple Tootsie Noodles, receive a distress signal that February is in danger. Before the team leaves, Junior, the son of the commander of G.L.E.E., gives them an android named Mega-Girl to take along, which the team reluctantly accepts despite the not-so-long-ago Robot Wars. Up received a famous injury during the Robot Wars, but Taz convinces him that he is still the man he once was, and is still the man who inspired her to become the person she is today, ("Get Back Up").

Bug doesn't adapt well to his first day of being an egg planter, hesitant to accept his mundane job ("Life"). Bug finds February, who has been blinded by bug mucus and taken captive. Because she cannot see, and Bug is the only Bug-World inhabitant who knows the human language from viewing the video on the crashed ship, February thinks that Bug is another captured human Starship Ranger. Bug sees this as his opportunity to live out his dreams, so he frees February and runs away with her. He runs into Bugette, who is shocked that he is running away with a human ("Life (Reprise)").

Up and the other Rangers find their way to where February's communication device's signal is coming from and encounter some of the bug inhabitants of Bug-World. They try to fight off the "monsters" and the bug inhabitants try to protect themselves from the "invaders" ("Hideous Creatures").

Bug tries to tell February the truth amongst the fighting between the Rangers and bugs, but is interrupted when Mega-Girl attacks him with her lasers, ultimately causing Bug to run away and the Rangers to retrieve February. However, Mega-Girl betrays the Rangers and leaves them behind, taking only the now-unconscious February with her.

Bug is brought before the Overqueen because of his actions, and is sentenced to death. Before he can be squashed, Roach arrives and sticks up for Bug, using his high status to save his friend. Because of this, the Overqueen lets Bug live, but forbids him from ever leaving the hive or making contact with humans again (or singing). It is revealed a jealous Bugette was the one who informed the Overqueen of Bug's actions. She tries to apologize, but Bug rejects her.

Bug is then visited by the Mosquitos who take Bug to meet their boss, Pincer. Bug and Pincer discuss how they each want to befriend the humans and don't want to do the jobs the Overqueen assigned them to. Pincer reveals he has obtained a "brain leech" indigenous to the bug world, which allows two creatures to become psychically linked, and a cryotube containing a brain dead human body, recovered from the crashed starship, and proposes that Bug can take control of this body. Pincer's only condition is that Bug befriends the humans and brings them "for dinner". Bug eagerly agrees, not knowing that Pincer intends to eat their brains and let the Mosquitos suck their blood ("Kick It Up a Notch").

The Rangers escape from the bugs, but are not dealing well with being stranded on the bug planet, especially Taz, who finally realizes that Up has gone soft since the end of the Robot Wars. She takes over as the leader of the Rangers.

The team gets stuck in a giant spider's web, but Bug, now in the human body, convinces the spider not to eat them and joins the Rangers, who think he is the sole survivor of the starship crash from eighteen years before. The group decides to find February's ship to get back to their own. Roach tries to talk Bug out of going, but he has made up his mind to live his dream ("Status Quo").

=== Act II ===
Junior contacts the leader of G.L.E.E., Evil Dr. Spaceclaw. It is revealed that Junior sent February to the planet by herself so she would be implanted with a bug egg and be returned to Earth and mass-produce an alien bug army. Spaceclaw, Junior's father, is pleased with his son's work but urges him to return with the bug soon. However, when Mega-Girl scans February, no alien life is detected.

The Rangers make it back to the ship. To keep the ship from leaving, Junior tells the Rangers that the ship's warp crystals are missing, meaning they are stuck there. Everyone goes their separate ways to rest before beginning the hunt for the crystals. Taz is still giving Up the cold shoulder and refuses to spend time with him. Tootsie confesses his feelings for Mega-Girl, while Bug struggles to tell February the truth about himself ("The Way I Do").

Bug goes to Up for some advice about his situation with February, but ends up helping Up overcome his feelings of weakness. In return, Up convinces Bug that being himself is what is important. Bug decides to take February back to Bug-World to show her his true nature. Junior overhears this and plans to go after them to re-initiate his plan and kill Bug. Junior asks Mega-Girl to keep the Rangers distracted, but she refuses because of her feelings for Tootsie. Junior removes her inhibitor chip, causing her to regain her suppressed feeling of lethal aggression towards humans.

Meanwhile, Bug brings February back to Bug-World to try to show her his true self through bug culture. The other bugs look at the humans with disgust, but Roach explains that there is beauty in everything and tries to show that to February ("Beauty"). February is less than impressed with Bug-World, leading Bug to have second thoughts about revealing his secret. February suddenly has the idea that Bug must have brought her to Bug-World to take her to his crashed starship to obtain its warp crystals. Junior follows after them, but is captured by the Mosquitos.

Bug brings February to the crashed starship, and the two stumble upon a more complete version of the video Bug had been watching, revealing that G.L.E.E. already knew about the bug inhabitants and sent the crew to capture one, leading to them all being killed. February pieces together Junior's plan in a moment of clarity, and the duo rushes back to the ship to warn the other Rangers.

Junior is brought to Pincer's lair, where Pincer reveals that he killed the survivors of the starship crash eighteen years before, and that Bug, who is in fact a bug, is actually working for him. Junior tells Pincer that Bug is working with the humans, so in exchange for his life, weapons, and secrets about the Overqueen and her hive, Junior forms an alliance with Pincer and promises him more humans to eat.

Bug and February return to the starship, where they tell the crew about Junior's plan. As another ship docks, the crew prepares to arrest Junior. However, Pincer and the Mosquitos invade the ship, and Pincer coerces Bug into telling the Rangers the truth about himself by threatening to kill February. Krayonder sacrifices himself so the other rangers can escape.

Mega-Girl attacks Tootsie and Specs. Tootsie reveals he changed his last name to Megagirl (on his planet, a person's last name is what they love) and affirms that he loves her even though she is a robot. Tootsie's showing of affection causes her to overcome her programming and download emotion software, allowing them to be together.

Meanwhile, the Mosquitos ambush Taz and start sucking her blood. Up, seeing the bugs hurting Taz, Up tells them to suck his blood instead. When they do, Up starts using breathing exercises to force each of them to drink more of his blood than their bodies can handle, and they explode. Up and Taz are ecstatic that he is still tough and Up realizes that he needed to learn to kill "with [his] heart," and that caring about Taz doesn't make him weak, but only makes him stronger.

Bug and Pincer battle. As Pincer prepares to kill February, Bug stabs Pincer and locks the two of them in the ship's airlock. Bug confesses his love for February and says his final goodbyes to his friends before having February jettison himself and Pincer out of the airlock into space.

Because his human body was destroyed, Bug's mind returns to his bug body on Bug-World, where Junior is attacking the hive, ("Kick It Up a Notch (Reprise)"). Bug catches up with Junior, who wants to take the Overqueen with him, even though it means the whole hive will die without her. Junior fires his weapon at Bug, and Bugette jumps in the way, sacrificing herself. Her larva then spring from her egg sac and attack Junior, devouring him. The bugs rejoice that their hive has been saved and pay tribute to the fallen Bugette.

The Overqueen appoints Bug as an ambassador between Bug-World and other planets, but Bug decides to seek out his Ranger friends to see if he still deserves the job. The starship crew lays Bug's human body to rest. Bug shows his true self to them and February, who loves him despite her distaste for bugs, kisses him. Tootsie and Mega-Girl get married, and humans, bugs, and machines all learn to live together in harmony ("Beauty (Reprise)").

== Cast and characters ==
Character	Chicago (2011)
Bug	Joey Richter
Commander Up	Joe Walker
Taz / Buggette Buggington	Lauren Lopez
Tootsie Noodles / Pincer	Dylan Saunders
February	Denise Donovan
Junior / Veeto Mosquito	Brian Holden
Mega-Girl	Meredith Stepien
Specs	Julia Albain
Roach	Brant Cox
The Overqueen / Sweetheart Mosquito	Jim Povolo
Krayonder	Joe Moses
Neato Mosquito	Jaime Lyn Beatty
The Caller Bug / Mister Bug	Nick Lang

Note: All actors except Joey Richter played additional ensemble roles.

A.J. Holmes makes a cameo appearance as the Starship captain in a video that Bug watches during the musical. A number of other StarKid members also have uncredited cameos in the opening video portion of Starship, including Chris Allen, Tyler Brunsman, Richard Campbell, Britney Coleman, Arielle Goldman, Devin Lytle, Lily Marks, Nicholas Joseph Strauss-Matathia, and Brian Rosenthal. The video also features narration from voice actor Bob Joles.

Starship is the first StarKid-related project Meredith Stepien has performed in since 2007's Little White Lie.

Because Starship was staged in Chicago and not in Michigan, many StarKid members who had yet to graduate were only able to make video appearances, such as those above. Joey Richter was the only StarKid member who had yet to graduate to appear in Starship.

This was the first StarKid Production in which Darren Criss did not make an appearance (he was filming Glee at the time of the production); his absence is referenced when February and Commander Up quipped "The Galactic League of Extraterrestrial Exploration wants to capture the bugs so they can make their own twisted abominations" "Damn that G.L.E.E.! They're always making twisted abominations of everything!" followed by a wink at Criss, who attended the filmed performance. Brian Holden as the villain Junior also wears Criss's signature pink Wayfarer sunglasses.

== Musical numbers ==
Act I

- "I Wanna Be" – Bug, Roach, Inhabitants of Bug-World
- "Get Back Up" – Taz, Up, Starship Rangers
- "Life" – Bug
- "Hideous Creatures" – Starship Rangers, Inhabitants of Bug-World
- "Kick It Up a Notch" – Pincer, Bug, Neato Mosquito, Veeto Mosquito, Sweetheart Mosquito
- "Status Quo" – Bug

Act II

- "The Way I Do" – Tootsie Noodles, Mega-Girl, February, Bug
- "Beauty" – Roach, Inhabitants of Bug-World
- "Kick It Up a Notch" (Reprise) – Junior
- "Beauty" (Reprise) – Inhabitants of Bug-World, Starship Rangers

== Development ==
Production on Starship began before Darren Criss landed his role on Glee. The original concept for the show came from StarKid ensemble member Joe Walker, who suggested to Criss a musical parody of Starship Troopers. Criss then expanded the concept, referring to it as "The Little Mermaid meets Aliens". Incidentally, Criss was originally meant to play the part of Tootsie Noodles before becoming occupied by Glee. Glee is alluded to in the musical, where Up observes "Damn that G.L.E.E.! Always making twisted abominations out of everything", ostensibly referring to the Galactic League of Extraterrestrial Exploration.

The puppet used for Roach was later used as a background puppet in the webseries World's Worst Musical (which featured guest appearances by various StarKid members).

== Productions ==
The musical was premiered February 11-23rd, 2011, at the Hoover-Leppen Theatre in Chicago, Illinois. It then had sold out screenings in Chicago, Los Angeles, and New York. The group put an edited version of the musical up on YouTube on April 30, 2011, cutting an estimated hour of run time.

According to Brian Holden, the musical is not available for licensing due to a lack of sheet music: Criss composed the music using chord charts, which would need to be transcribed to facilitate other productions.

== Recording ==
A cast recording of the production was released on April 30, 2011, alongside the YouTube premiere of the musical, through iTunes and Amazon.com. All of the songs featured on stage are present on the recording. The album debuted at No. 134 on the Billboard 200 and No. 1 for Top Cast Albums.

== Critical reception ==
Starship won the Best New Work award in the 2011 BroadwayWorld Chicago Awards.

== See also ==
- List of musicals
