= Tin Can Brothers =

American comedy group

The Tin Can Brothers, also known as the Tin Can Bros, are an Los Angeles based comedy group founded in 2014 by Joey Richter, Brian Rosenthal, and Corey Lubowich. The trio has written, directed, and produced a wide variety of creative endeavors, including original musicals, sketch comedy shows, short films, and a video/podcast companion series.

== History ==
Tin Can Brothers began as a YouTube channel in 2014, consisting mostly of sketch comedy videos featuring Richter and Rosenthal in their apartment. Many of the sketches featured other actors and friends, and these sketches eventually allowed Tin Can Brothers to grow into a much larger company. The trio met at the University of Michigan while working with Team StarKid. Their viewers regularly contribute to their projects on Kickstarter, and the Tin Can Brothers have amassed over $573,000 on the platform.

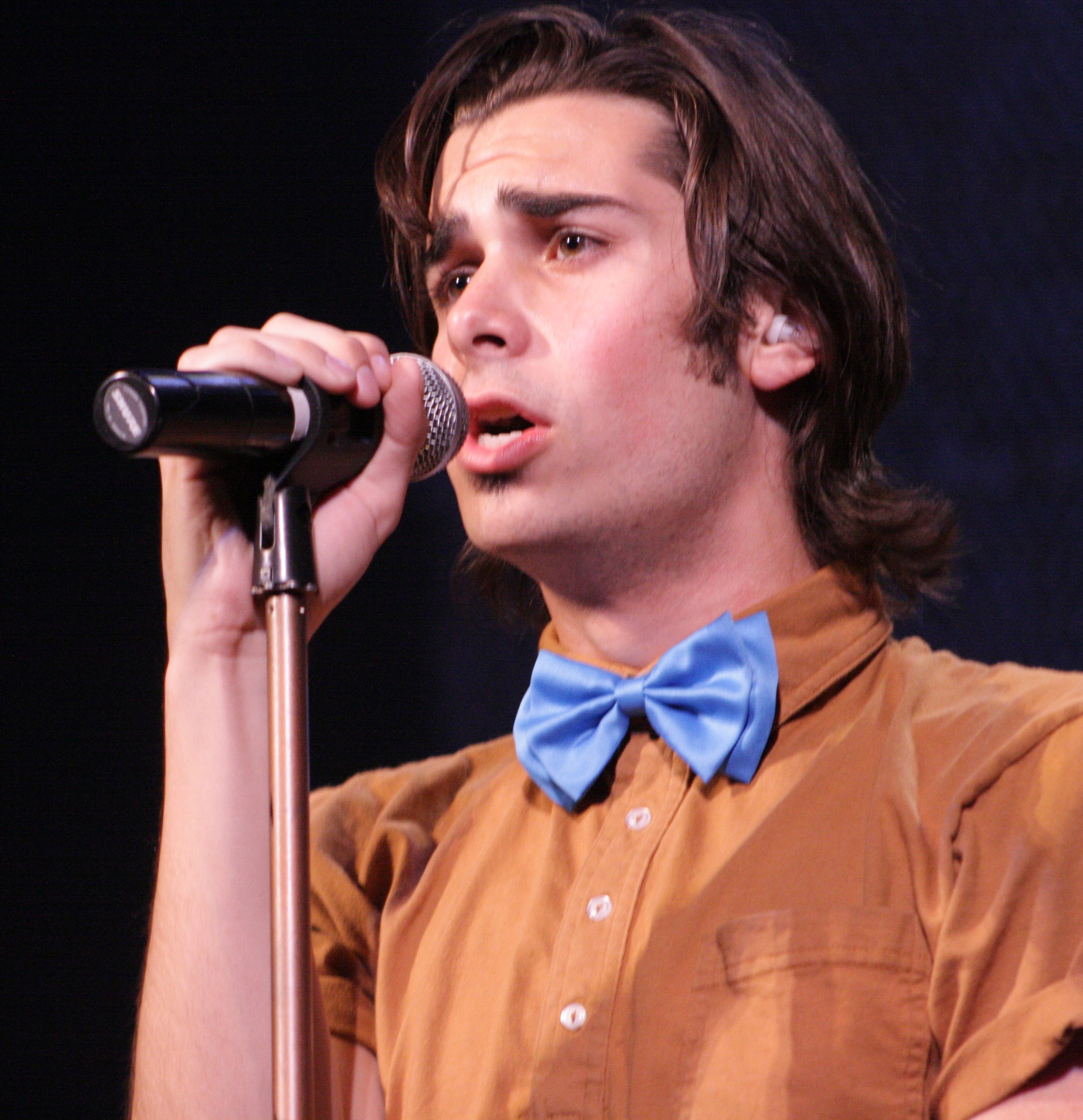
Joey Richter, one of the Tin Can Brothers

=== Members ===
Joey Richter is an American actor who first gained popularity after appearing as Ron Weasley in Team StarKid's A Very Potter Musical, which was published on YouTube in 2009. Richter went on to appear in many other productions with the company, including throughout his time with the Tin Can Brothers. He is married to Lauren Lopez, who has been involved with many Tin Can Brothers projects over the years.

Brian Rosenthal also appeared in A Very Potter Musical as Professor Quirrell, but took a hiatus from StarKid after the Potter series. He has pursued a variety of other projects in local film and theater.

Corey Lubowich is a writer, director, and producer who has worked across a variety of mediums. He also worked with StarKid in their early days on the technical side of production, and went on to direct several productions of A VHS Christmas Carol in the early 2020's.

=== Tinlightenment World Tour ===
In honor of TCB's 10-year anniversary, the Tinlightenment World Tour went to Kickstarter in early 2024, with the hopes of raising funds for a variety of projects throughout 2024 and the coming years. The roster of projects included several Spies are Forever live concert screenings, a full run of The Solve It Squad! Returns at the Edinburgh Fringe Festival, a This Could Be On Broadway concert at 54 Below, a new musical called Gross Prophets, a pilot reading of Intelligent Life, and several iterations of The Great Debate. Many of these projects are ongoing.

== Popular works ==
=== Spies are Forever ===
Spies are Forever is an original musical by the Tin Can Brothers that follows Agent Curt Mega as he works against the Nazis in the Cold War. The Tin Can Brothers wrote the book, while Talkfine (Clark Baxtresser & Pierce Siebers) wrote the music and lyrics. Corey Lubowich directed the original production. The show was released for free in 15 parts on YouTube, divvied up by act and scene number. Spies Are Forever features 19 original songs, which were also released in the original cast recording in 2016.

The story follows Agent Curt Mega's depression after his partner, Owen, does not survive their last mission. He is forced to spy again after discovering that the Nazis are plotting with the Deadliest Man Alive, and he must join forces with Tatiana in order to defeat the Deadliest Man Alive and foil the Nazi plot. He meets a variety of characters along the way, and must contend with his past in this musical spy thriller.

| Character | Original Production | Spies Are Forever Reloaded | 54 Below | Spy Another Day: Live Concert Screenings | |
| Character | 2016 | 2016 | 2022 | 2024 (U.S.) | 2024 (U.K.) |
|---|---|---|---|---|---|
| Agent Curt Mega | Curt Mega | Curt Mega | Curt Mega | Curt Mega | Obioma Ugoala |
| Tatiana Slozhno / various | Mary Kate Wiles | Mary Kate Wiles | Mary Kate Wiles | Mary Kate Wiles | Evelyn Hoskins |
| Lounge Singer | Mary Kate Wiles | Mary Kate Wiles | ? | Mariah Rose Faith Casillas | Erin Caldwell |
| The Deadliest Man Alive / various | Joe Walker | Joe Walker | Pomme Koch | Joe Walker | Dean John Wilson |
| Agent Owen Carvour / various | Joey Richter | Joey Richter | ? | Joey Richter | Oliver Ormson |
| Sergio Santos | Joey Richter | Joey Richter | ? | Carlos Alazraqui | ? |
| Vanger Borschtit | Joey Richter | Joey Richter | A.J. Holmes | Tom Lenk | Joey Richter |
| Dr. Baron Von Nazi / various | Brian Rosenthal | Brian Rosenthal | ? | ? | Jak Malone |
| Cynthia Houston / Mrs. Mega / various | Lauren Lopez | Lauren Lopez | Lauren Lopez | Lauren Lopez | Claire M. Hall |
| Barb Larvernor / various | Tessa Netting | Tessa Netting | Tessa Netting | Tessa Netting | Emily Ooi |
| The Informant / various | Esther Fallick | Esther Fallick | Esther Fallick | ? | Brian Rosenthal |

The 54 Below production was scheduled to happen in 2020, but it had to be postponed due to the COVID-19 pandemic.

=== The Solve It Squad (series) ===
The Solve It Squad Returns is a one-act play by the Tin Can Brothers parodying Scooby-Doo. It follows the Solve It Squad as young adults as they struggle to adapt after the death of their dog, Cluebert. When new information surfaces about Cluebert's untimely death, the squad reunites to crack the case once and for all.

| Character | The Solve It Squad Returns | | Solve It Squad: Back In Biz | How the Grunch Cribbed Christmas | The Solve It Squad Returns |
| Character | 2017 (Original Production) | 2018 (Off-Broadway) | 2021 | 2022 | 2024 (Edinburgh Fringe Festival) |
|---|---|---|---|---|---|
| Scrags | Joey Richter | Joey Richter | Joey Richter | Joey Richter | Joey Richter |
| Gwen | Ashley Clements | Ashley Clements | Ashley Clements | Ashley Clements | Ashley Clements |
| Keith | Gabe Greenspan | Gabe Greenspan | Gabe Greenspan | Gabe Greenspan | Gabe Greenspan |
| Esther | Lauren Lopez | Lauren Lopez | Lauren Lopez | Lauren Lopez | Lauren Lopez |
| Everyone else | Brian Rosenthal | Brian Rosenthal | Brian Rosenthal | Brian Rosenthal | Brian Rosenthal |
| Everyone else | Brian Rosenthal | Brian Rosenthal | Robert Manion | Corey Dorris | Brian Rosenthal |
| Everyone else | Brian Rosenthal | Brian Rosenthal | Darren Criss | Corey Dorris | Brian Rosenthal |
| Everyone else | Brian Rosenthal | Brian Rosenthal | Joanna Sotomura | Corey Dorris | Brian Rosenthal |
| Everyone else | Brian Rosenthal | Brian Rosenthal | Jiavani Linayao | Jiavani Linayao | Brian Rosenthal |

=== Wayward Guide for the Untrained Eye ===
Wayward Guide for the Untrained Eye is a dual medium series that premiered on October 12, 2020 at a drive-in theatre in Los Angeles, CA. The story follows the fictional Schue-Horyn twins, who travel to Connor Creek and create a podcast about the mysterious happenings in the area. The Tin Can Brothers released ten episodes of a video series in tandem with ten episodes of the fictional podcast.

Mary Kate Wiles and Steve Zaragoza lead as twins Artemis and Paul. The large ensemble cast features Sean Astin, Whitney Avalon, Brendan Bradley, Ashley Clements, Jon Cozart, Darren Criss, Corey Dorris, Spencer Devlin Howard, Amrita Dhaliwal, Jackie Emerson, Gabe Greenspan, Sarah Grace Hart, A.J. Holmes, Paul Komoroski, Nick Lang, Lauren Lopez, Diane Lopez-Richter, Titus Makin Jr., Curt Mega, Tara Perry, Sinead Persaud, Sean Persaud, Gavyn Pickens, Ed Powell, Joey Richter, Brian Rosenthal, Dylan Saunders, Cassie Silva, Ryan Simpkins, Clayton Snyder, Joanna Sotomura, Daniel Strauss, and Carlos Valdes. With a variety of their members featured, StarKid Productions promoted the project on their YouTube channel.

== Notable Projects ==
=== Alive! On Stage! ===
Alive! On Stage! was a sketch comedy show performed on August 9–10, 2014 at Stage 773 in Chicago. It featured all three of the Tin Can Brothers, as well as Jaime Lyn Beatty, Jeff Blim, Joey deBettencourt, Lauren Lopez, Elyse Serafini, and Joe Walker. The Tin Can Brothers were able to access Stage 773 for these late-night performances because StarKid was using the space during the daytime for their "Summer Series" productions of The Trail to Oregon! and Ani: A Parody.

=== Seriously. Not A Joke. ===
Seriously. Not A Joke. was a sketch comedy show performed on December 11–13, 2014 at the ACME Comedy Theatre in Los Angeles. It featured all three of the Tin Can Brothers, as well as Brant Cox, Esther Fallick, Emily Hanley, Jordan Kelley, and Ashley Skidmore.

=== Choose Our Destiny Improv Adventure ===
Choose Our Destiny Improv Adventure was a weekly musical improv show on Project Alpha (Geek & Sundry) starring the Tin Can Brothers, Lauren Lopez, and Ashley Skidmore; with Eric Schackne on the piano. It ran for 27 episodes before Project Alpha shut down. The show allowed online audience members to cast their vote during the show and influence the story.

| Episode | Theme | Title |
|---|---|---|
| 01 | Sci-Fi | Space Junkies |
| 02 | Sci-Fi | Love Lasers Lost |
| 03 | Sci-Fi | Planet of the Grapes |
| 04 | Holiday | Holiday Fun Ride |
| 05 | Holiday | Feliz NaviDAD |
| 06 | Holiday | Deck the Balls |
| 07 | Holiday | CHALLAHback Girl |
| 08 | Film Noir | Whispers in the Moonlight |
| 09 | Film Noir | Smokin' Guns and Toasty Buns |
| 10 | Film Noir | Murder... On The Rocks |
| 11 | Rom-Com | Smack Dem Lips With Mine |
| 12 | Rom-Com | New Phone Who Dis |
| 13 | Rom-Com | oB*TCHuary |
| 14 | Rom-Com | We Bought A Pool |
| 15 | Teen Horror | Sleepover Slasher |
| 16 | Teen Horror | There Will Be Gluten |
| 17 | Teen Horror | The Bare B*tch Project |
| 18 | Teen Horror | Have A Knife Day |
| 19 | Teen Horror | Friday the 19th |
| 20 | High Octane | Gone in 60 Minutes |
| 21 | High Octane | Die Soft |
| 22 | High Octane | The Escape Games |
| 23 | High Octane | Last Action Gyro |
| 24 | Fantasy | Thief of Thog |
| 25 | Fantasy | The Cancelled Quest |
| 26 | Fantasy | Can I Has Dragon? |
| 27 | Fantasy | The Fellows and the Ring |

=== Flop Stoppers ===
Flop Stoppers is a musical short film about two friends thrust into a Hollywood action scheme. It stars Brian Rosenthal and Joey Richter. Flop Stoppers premiered at Buffer Festival 2016, and it was released on May 9, 2017.

=== Idle Worship ===
Idle Worship is a mockumentary short film about the dangers of extreme stardom starring Ashley Clements. Idle Worship premiered at Buffer Festival 2017, and it was released on August 7, 2018

=== We Didn't Plan to Kill Our Guest ===
We Didn't Plan to Kill Our Guest was a series of one-act plays personalized to the guests they featured. These began in June 2019 with Jon Cozart, Devin Lytle, Lee Newton, and Dylan Saunders. All three of the Tin Can Brothers appeared as themselves, while Lauren Lopez, Jaime Lyn Beatty, and Angela Giarratana formed a small ensemble. A second series of live shows was planned for March 2020, but these were instead hastily filmed without an audience and released on digital. This series featured Jon Matteson, Tessa Netting, Joe Walker, and Mary Kate Wiles.

=== This Could Be On Broadway ===
This Could Be On Broadway is a musical about a high school theatre club's production of "The Matrix Musical". It was originally released on March 8, 2022 as a staged reading, featuring Chris Bunyi, Bryce Charles, Esther Fallick, Ryan Garcia, Jiavani Linayao, Lauren Lopez, Joey Richter, Brian Rosenthal, Jessie Sherman, and James Tolbert. StarKid Productions promoted the show on their YouTube channel. This Could Be On Broadway was later performed at 54 Below in November 2024 as part of the Tinlightenment World Tour.

| Character | Original Staged Reading | 54 Below |
| Character | 2022 | 2024 |
|---|---|---|
| Bethanne | Bryce Charles | Bryce Charles |
| Kris | Ryan Garcia | Camden Garcia |
| MC / Theo Bradley Pearson / various | Joey Richter | Joey Richter |
| Eric | Brian Rosenthal | Brian Rosenthal |
| Cole | Esther Fallick | Murphy Taylor Smith |
| Alex | Jiavani Linayao | Khadija Sankoh |
| Max | James Tolbert | ? |
| Jean | Lauren Lopez | Samantha Massell |
| Mom | Lauren Lopez | Lauren Lopez |
| Estelle (Freshman #1) | Jessie Sherman | N/A |
| Joshua (Freshman #2) | Chris Bunyi | N/A |
| Stage directions | Daniel Strauss | N/A |

=== Gross Prophets ===
Gross Prophets is a musical about corporate schemes. The original production starred Joey Richter, Brian Rosenthal, and Lauren Lopez. It played in Melbourne in February 2025 as part of the Tinlightenment World Tour.

| Character | Original Production | Australia | Los Angeles | |
| Character | 2024 | 2025 | | |
|---|---|---|---|---|
| Bachman Turner Underwood | Brian Rosenthal | Brian Rosenthal | Marty Scanlon | Marty Scanlon |
| April–May June | Lauren Lopez | Lauren Lopez | Lauren Lopez | Lauren Lopez |
| Todd Angle | Joey Richter | Joey Richter | Joey Richter | Joey Richter |
| Special guest | N/A | N/A | Catherine McCafferty | Jonny Manganello |

=== The Great Debate ===
The Great Debate is an ongoing series of comedy gameshows pitting different online groups against each other in a friendly debate matchup. Joey Richter hosts the shows.

- SMOSH vs Dropout - April 14, 2024
  - SMOSH: Chase McCrary, Angela Giarratana, Tommy Bowe
  - Dropout: Grant O'Brien, Jiavani Linayao, Vic Michaelis
- Drag Queens vs Dungeon Masters - July 7, 2024
  - Drag Queens: Pickle, Jonnie Reinhart, Meatball
  - Dungeon Masters: Matthew Mercer, Ify Nwadiwe, Damien Haas
- Canada vs The World - November 2, 2024 (at Buffer Festival)
  - Canada: Sabrina Cruz, Julie Nolke, Gregor Reynolds
  - The World: Amanda Lehan-Canto, Andrew Gregory, Courtney Miller
- Melbourne - March 30, 2025
  - Reuben Solo, Lillian Wenker
- Tweet-ers vs Tok-ers - May 18, 2025
  - Tweet-ers: Demi Adejuyigbe, Grace Helbig, Sam Sanders
  - Tok-ers: Arasha, Tom Lenk, Mariah Rose Faith Casillas
- Dropout vs StarKid - September 10, 2025
  - Dropout: Anna Garcia, Oscar Montoya, Rekha Shankar
  - StarKid: Devin Lytle, Joe Walker, Angela Giarratana

=== Intelligent Life ===
Intelligent Life is a queer sci-fi comedy that premiered in Los Angeles in November 2025 as part of the Tinlightenment World Tour. It starred Brendan Scannell and Vinny Thomas.

| Character | Pilot Reading |
| Character | 2025 |
|---|---|
| Casey Emerson | Brendan Scannell |
| Val Gosik | Vinny Thomas |
| Deb Mortimer | Vic Michaelis |
| Peyton Bach | Arasha |
| Hollis Ashford | Oscar Montoya |
| Noah Walsh | Jacquis Neal |
| Joyce Nguyen | Joanna Sotomura |
| Tate Sloane | Anna Garcia |
| Reese Navarro | Devin Way |
| E.D.N.A. | Lauren Lopez |

== Licensing ==
Tin Can Brothers released the rights to their two most popular shows (Spies Are Forever and The Solve It Squad! Returns) in 2023.
