= A Very Potter Musical =

Harry Potter parody musical

- AVPM soundtrack art
- Music: Darren Criss; A. J. Holmes
- Lyrics: Darren Criss; A. J. Holmes
- Book: Matt Lang; Nick Lang; Brian Holden
- Basis: Harry Potter by J. K. Rowling
- Productions: 2009 University of Michigan
- Awards: Entertainment Weekly's 10 Best Viral Videos of 2009

A Very Potter Musical (originally titled Harry Potter: The Musical and often shortened to AVPM) is a musical with music and lyrics by Darren Criss and A. J. Holmes and a book by Matt Lang, Nick Lang and Brian Holden. The story is a parody, based on several of the Harry Potter novels by J. K. Rowling (particularly Harry Potter and the Philosopher's Stone, Harry Potter and the Goblet of Fire and Harry Potter and the Deathly Hallows), as well as their film adaptations.

A Very Potter Musical tells the story of Harry Potter's return to Hogwarts School of Witchcraft and Wizardry, his participation in the House Cup Championship, the trials and tribulations of adolescence, and the return of the dark wizard Lord Voldemort and the Golden Trio's attempts to destroy the Horcruxes.

The musical was performed on April 9–11, 2009 on the University of Michigan campus and is currently available to watch online on YouTube. It was produced by StarKid Productions and directed by Matt Lang. The musical starred Darren Criss as Harry Potter, Joey Richter as Ron Weasley, Bonnie Gruesen as Hermione Granger, Jaime Lyn Beatty as Ginny Weasley, Lauren Lopez as Draco Malfoy, Brian Rosenthal as Quirinus Quirrell and Joe Walker as Lord Voldemort. In late June 2009, the group put the entire musical up on YouTube, and it became a viral video that obtained millions of views.

The popularity of this musical allowed Team StarKid to create subsequent musicals, such as Me and My Dick (2009), A Very Potter Sequel (2010), Starship (2011), Holy Musical B@man! (2012), Twisted: The Untold Story of a Royal Vizier (2013), The Trail to Oregon! (2014), ANI: A Parody (2014), Firebringer (2016), The Guy Who Didn't Like Musicals (2018), Black Friday (2019) and Nerdy Prudes Must Die (2023). A third installment of the A Very Potter series, called A Very Potter Senior Year, premiered at LeakyCon on August 11, 2012. A fourth installment, titled A Very Potter Christmas (this time audio-only and not a musical), was released as a reward for backers of Team StarKid's Firebringer musical and was later released to the public during the A Very Potter Golden Birthday!!! stream.

== Synopsis ==
=== Act I ===
Harry Potter rejoices that he is entering his second year at Hogwarts School of Witchcraft and Wizardry with his best friend Ron Weasley and nerd Hermione Granger ("Goin' Back to Hogwarts"). Headmaster of Hogwarts Albus Dumbledore welcomes everyone back, skips the Sorting Ceremony and reintroduces the House Cup Tournament, in which a champion will be chosen on behalf of each House (Gryffindor, Ravenclaw, Hufflepuff, and Slytherin) to fight for the House Cup. Professor Severus Snape chooses the champions out of a magical trophy to be Harry (Gryffindor), Harry's crush Cho Chang (Ravenclaw), her current boyfriend Cedric Diggory (Hufflepuff), and Harry's obnoxious rival Draco Malfoy (Slytherin). No one can drop out due to the enchantment on the trophy.

Draco attempts to intimidate Harry by claiming that he will transfer to Pigfarts, a prestigious wizarding academy on Mars presided over by Headmaster Rumbleroar, a talking lion, but Hermione forces him to back off. Meanwhile, Defense Against The Dark Arts professor Quirinus Quirrell is secretly conspiring to revive the evil wizard Voldemort, who is parasitically attached to the back of his head. They bicker about this arrangement, which causes inconvenience to both of them due to their conflicting personalities ("Different As Can Be").

Harry convinces Hermione to do all of his school work for him while he writes a love song for Cho Chang. He tests out the song on Ron's younger sister Ginny ("Ginny's Song"), oblivious to her own crush on him. Harry, Ron and Hermione use his Cloak of Invisibility to sneak off and investigate what the first round of the tournament entails, leaving Ginny alone to lament her unrequited love ("Harry"). The trio discover that the first round will involve dragons and eavesdrop on Malfoy hinting at an unrealized crush on Hermione.

Voldemort convinces Quirrell to go out and celebrate the progress of their evil plan instead of grading papers. After returning from a night of drunken escapades, they reminiscence on past events and how they have become good friends from their time spent together ("Different As Can Be (Reprise)"). Harry continues to neglect his preparation for the tournament, and is caught off-guard when he is forced to face a deadly Hungarian Horntail in battle while his competitors fight imaginary dragons. With no other choice, Harry summons his guitar and serenades the dragon into submission, allowing him to move on to the next round ("The Dragon Song").

The annual Yule Ball is announced, and Ginny asks Harry to be her partner. Unfortunately, Harry is dead set on asking Cho and unknowingly rejects Ginny, causing her to run off in tears. Harry plays his song for Cho ("Ginny's Song Reprise (Cho's Song)") but is rejected because Cho had already agreed to go with Cedric, leaving him and Ron as the only two male students without partners. Quirrell relieves Voldemort of his worries surrounding their master plan as the two weigh the pros and cons of their upcoming physical separation. Voldemort realizes he has become close with Quirrell, and that he wishes to remain his friend.

At the Yule Ball, the normally-unattractive Hermione shows up with a gorgeous makeover, causing Ron and Malfoy to realize their feelings for her ("Granger Danger"). Harry develops an attraction to Ginny and asks her to dance, leaving Ron to get "drunk" on Butterbeer and fight over Hermione with Malfoy, causing her to lash out at both of them. Harry pulls back from a kiss with Ginny, stating that they cannot be together because of his friendship with Ron. Ginny leaves in tears and a flustered Harry attempts to regain his dignity by cutting in with Cho, causing him to get into a fight with Cedric. As they argue, they both grab an enchanted ladle planted by Quirrell, teleporting them to a mysterious graveyard.

Quirrell appears, kills Cedric with the Killing Curse and uses the full Body-Bind curse on Harry. As Quirrell and Voldemort submerge themselves in a large cauldron, Snape appears and uses his own hand and Harry's blood to complete a ritual that successfully revives Voldemort, who joyfully celebrates with his followers, the Death Eaters ("To Dance Again!"). Bellatrix Lestrange arrives to welcome back her master and former lover and reveals their plan to use Quirrell as a scapegoat for the murder of Harry. Heartbroken, Quirrell falls out with Voldemort and is taken to Azkaban. Before Voldemort can kill Harry, Harry manages to use the ladle to escape back to Hogwarts, where he exclaims in horror that Voldemort has returned.

=== Act II ===
The Ministry of Magic doesn't believe that Voldemort's back, despite proof such as Voldemort's new vlog and his review of 17 Again, with the star Zac Efron. Meanwhile, Harry, consumed by the stress this situation is causing him, pushes his friends away by acting egocentric. Malfoy tries to make fun of Harry, but he's once more humiliated in front of the student body and he promises revenge. Ginny tries to make sense of her relationship with Harry, but he explains to her that as long as Voldemort is around, they can't be together because he wants to protect her. When Ginny runs away in tears, Dumbledore in disguise calls Harry to his office to discuss Voldemort.

Snape reveals himself as a Death Eater undercover and meets up with Voldemort, who is suffering from severe depression after his fight with Quirrell. Snape introduces Draco Malfoy to the Dark Lord, who informs him about a secret passage leading to Hogwarts in exchange for a rocket to Mars ("Pigfarts, Pigfarts, Here I Come"). Voldemort makes Draco sign a magical contract to make him kill Dumbledore. Harry, Ron and Hermione get to Dumbledore's office for the meeting. There, Dumbledore explains that Voldemort possesses some Horcruxes that make him immortal as long as they exist, he reveals that he has already destroyed five of the six Horcruxes and tells Harry to find the last one, hidden right there in Hogwarts. At that moment, the Death Eaters break into Dumbledore's office and arrest him. Malfoy is ready to follow through his part of the deal, but after a speech from Dumbledore he finds himself unable to give him the final blow. Snape takes the initiative and kills Dumbledore, traumatising Harry, who declares he has to kill Voldemort on his own.

Voldemort successfully takes over the Ministry of Magic, but he's still sad about the loss of Quirrell. Voldemort, Quirrell and Harry lament all the people they lost ("Missing You"). After that, a Death Eater informs Voldemort that Hogwarts has fallen, and Voldemort gets ready to leave for Hogwarts.

Ginny finds Harry and tries to convince him that he has the power to save everyone, but Harry is pessimistic and he complains about all the unrealistic expectations and the pressure on him for being the "Boy Who Lived". Ginny reassures him that he's not alone in his fight against evil ("Not Alone") and he makes up with Ron and Hermione. With Malfoy's help, who regretted his choices, Harry and Ron go to Dumbledore's office to destroy the last Horcrux, while Ginny and Hermione try to contact the Order of the Phoenix. Before they separate, Ron apologises to Hermione for his behaviour at the Yule Ball and the two share a passionate kiss.

Harry, Ron and Malfoy find out that the last Horcrux is Zac Efron's poster that Dumbledore kept in his office. The Horcrux tries to turn Ron against Harry by taking the form of Voldemort and Hermione and relying on his insecurities. Ron fights against it and destroys the Horcrux, rekindling his friendship with Harry.

A group of Death Eaters led by Bellatrix arrives in the office, after having captured Ginny and Hermione. Snape is revealed to be Dumbledore's agent and tries to save the students, but Bellatrix kills him. At that moment Ginny and Ron's mother, Molly Weasley, intervenes and kills Bellatrix. With his last breath, Snape reveals that Harry became a seventh Horcrux the night his parents died.

Voldemort has arrived at Hogwarts and demands that the student body delivers Harry to him in exchange for their lives. Harry realises that he has to die to save everyone else and he turns himself in to Voldemort, who kills him. In a realm between life and death, Harry meets Dumbledore, who explains to him that by killing Harry, Voldemort involuntarily destroyed his seventh Horcrux. Dumbledore makes Harry return to the world of the living before leaving for Pigfarts riding Rumbleroar, the lion who acts as Headmaster at the Mars school.

Ron and Hermione gather the other Hogwarts students and convince them to fight because that's what Harry would have done ("Voldemort is Goin' Down"). When Harry shows himself still alive, everybody cheers, but Voldemort bursts into the room, shocked that Harry isn't dead. Harry explains that his sacrifice made the Hogwarts' students immune to Voldemort's magic, and that Voldemort's disregard about other people is eventually going to be his demise. Voldemort tries the Avada Kedavra curse, but Harry counterattacks the spell and kills him.

The student body celebrates Voldemort's death, and Neville Longbottom finds Dumbledore's will, in which the Headmaster awards Gryffindor with the House Cup and nominates Harry as the new Headmaster. Harry kisses Ginny after Ron gives them his blessing, and all the students throw a party.

At Azkaban, Quirrell hears about Voldemort's death and he's devastated. However, the last residue of Voldemort's soul comes to make amends with Quirrell, and the two gloriously reunite ("Not Alone (Reprise)/Goin' Back to Hogwarts (Reprise)").

== Cast and characters ==
Character	University of Michigan 2009
Harry Potter	Darren Criss
Ron Weasley	Joey Richter
Hermione Granger	Bonnie Gruesen
Ginny Weasley	Jaime Lyn Beatty
Draco Malfoy	Lauren Lopez
Lord Voldemort	Joe Walker
Albus Dumbledore	Dylan Saunders
Quirinus Quirrell	Brian Rosenthal
Severus Snape	Joe Moses
Bellatrix Lestrange	Britney Coleman
Cedric Diggory / Cornelius Fudge	Tyler Brunsman
Cho Chang	Devin Lytle
Neville Longbottom	Richard Campbell
Vincent Crabbe	Julia Albain
Lavender Brown	Sango Tajima
Gregory Goyle	Jim Povolo
Pansy Parkinson / Molly Weasley	Lily Marks

Notes

A. J. Holmes, the music director for the show, is involved in the actual musical twice, first leaving his duties as the piano player to give Ron some Twizzlers (not Red Vines, which would not appear until the next musical), and second being threatened by Voldemort when he starts playing sad music to accompany Voldemort thinking about Quirrell.

== Musical numbers ==
Act I

- "Goin' Back to Hogwarts" – Students of Hogwarts and Dumbledore
- "Different As Can Be (When I Rule the World)" – Voldemort and Quirrell
- "Ginny's Song" – Harry
- "Harry" – Ginny
- "Different As Can Be" (Reprise) – Voldemort and Quirrell
- "The Dragon Song" – Harry and the Hungarian Horntail
- "Ginny's Song Reprise (Cho's Song)" – Harry
- "Granger Danger" – Ron and Draco
- "To Dance Again!" – Voldemort, Quirrell and Death Eaters

Act II

- "Pigfarts" – Draco
- "Missing You" – Harry and Quirrell
- "Not Alone" – Ginny, Harry, Ron and Hermione
- "Voldemort is Goin' Down" – Ron, Hermione and Students of Hogwarts
- "Not Alone (Reprise)/Goin' Back to Hogwarts (Reprise)" – Everyone in the Wizarding World

- A rendition of "Granger Danger" performed by Darren Criss is played during the credits of the YouTube version of the production.

== Development ==
While reading Harry Potter and the Goblet of Fire, Nick Lang and a few others attending the University of Michigan discussed the possibility of Draco Malfoy having a crush on Hermione Granger because of him constantly bullying her, and created the concept of a song "Granger Danger", which led to the idea of making a Harry Potter musical. When the script was being written, they asked Darren Criss if they could use his songs "Sami", which was originally written for the web series Little White Lie, and "Not Alone", which they ended up using as a model for the show.

== Productions ==
Harry Potter: The Musical was performed April 9–11, 2009, on the University of Michigan campus. Soon after, the group posted the entire musical on YouTube. However, it was later taken down and edited to make it less inappropriate for the younger audiences, but was posted again, slightly edited and under the new name A Very Potter Musical in late June 2009. As of March 2018, the production in its entirety has around 100 million views.

Due to the nature of the musical, Team Starkid is allowed by Warner Brothers to host the musical on their channel and owns the rights to the songs and script, but as they do not own the rights to the Harry Potter characters they cannot make money off of the production, nor can they give the rights for the show to any other production company: the University of Michigan version is the only "official" production. This has not stopped unauthorized productions from being performed elsewhere, also done non-profit.

== Recording ==
A cast recording of the production was released in 2009 through the StarKid Productions website. All of the songs featured on stage are present on the recording. The group also released the album through Bandcamp on July 29, 2010.

== Sequels ==
Two other musicals entitled A Very Potter Sequel and A Very Potter Senior Year were released by Starkid in 2010 and 2012 respectively.

== Critical reception ==
Entertainment Weekly named the musical one of the 10 Best Viral Videos of 2009.

== See also ==
- Lists of musicals
- Parodies of Harry Potter
