= Wayward Guide for the Untrained Eye =

2021 comedy-horror web series

- Genre: Comedy; Horror
- Created by: Corey Lubowich; Brian Rosenthal; Joey Richter
- Written by: Corey Lubowich; Brian Rosenthal; Joey Richter
- Directed by: Corey Lubowich; Brian Rosenthal; Joey Richter
- Starring: Mary Kate Wiles; Steve Zaragoza
- Theme music composer: Chuck Criss
- Opening theme: "Wayward Guide" Theme Song
- Composers: Clark Baxtresser; Pierce Siebers
- Country of origin: United States
- Original language: English
- No. of seasons: 1
- No. of episodes: 10

Production
- Executive producers: Corey Lubowich; Brian Rosenthal; Joey Richter; Paul Komoroski; Gregg Gibbons; April Morris
- Cinematography: Benji Dell
- Camera setup: Single-camera
- Running time: 8-15 Minutes
- Production company: Tin Can Brothers

Original release
- Release: October 13 – December 15, 2020

Wayward Guide for the Untrained Eye, also simply known as Wayward Guide, is an American comedy-horror web television series created by Corey Lubowich, Brian Rosenthal, and Joey Richter. It follows twin podcasting duo, Artemis (Mary Kate Wiles) and Paul Schue-Horyn (Steve Zaragoza), who investigate the fictional town of Connor Creek. The show also features an ensemble including Sean Astin, Darren Criss, Carlos Valdes, A. J. Holmes, Ashley Clements, Titus Makin, Cassie Silva, Dylan Saunders, Joanna Sotomura, Jon Cozart, Lauren Lopez, Nick Lang, and Clayton Snyder.

Along with quarter-hour episodes being released to YouTube, the show also hosts an in-universe podcast hosted by Wiles and Zaragoza. The series' first episode premiered on October 12, 2020, at a drive-in hosted by Tin Can Brothers. The first episode was released on YouTube on October 13, 2020.

== Premise ==
Wayward Guide follows the adventures of twin podcasting team Artemis and Paul Schue-Horyn as they investigate a mystery in the mining town of Connor Creek. But what starts as a corruption investigation gets a lot hairier when it’s revealed that the oddballs of this small town are harboring a dark and furry secret: Werewolves.

== Cast ==
=== Main ===
- Mary Kate Wiles as Artemis Schue-Horyn
- Steve Zaragoza as Paul Schue-Horyn

=== Recurring ===
- Joanna Sotomura as Madison Reynolds
- Nick Lang as Aubrey Dockweiler
- Carlos Valdes as Dr. Henry Edwards
- Dylan Saunders as Desmond Brewer
- Lauren Lopez as Agnes Florentine
- Tara Perry as Olivia Tompkins / Riley Kirkland
- Corey Dorris as Quinn Cassidy
- Curt Mega as Cliff Irons
- Joey Richter as Crispin Lynch
- Gavyn Pickens as Helen Unger
- Cassie Silva as Truman Hensley
- Sean Persaud as Jeremiah Stillwater
- Ashley Clements as Mary Jo Walker
- Sinead Persaud as Rita Waldeburg
- Whitney Avalon as Rocky Irons
- Ryan Simpkins as Jewel Irons
- Sean Astin as Lesly Stone
- Gabe Greenspan as Ellis Walker
- A. J. Holmes as Sybilus Silver II
- Clayton Snyder as Vern Marrow
- Brian Rosenthal as Wallis Gale
- Daniel Strauss as Barney Fletcher
- Titus Makin Jr. as Silas Torsen
- Jon Cozart as Donny Meadows
- Brendan Bradley as Odie Doty
- Paul Komoroski as Garmin Patrick Saget

=== Guest ===
- Amrita Dhaliwal as Prism
- Ed Powell as Ed Puppetman
- Darren Criss as Ryan Reynolds
- Jackie Emerson as Rebecca
- Spencer Devlin Howard as America's Favorite Podcast Host
- Sarah Grace Hart as The Mayor's Handler
- Diane Lopez-Richter as The Mayor

== Episodes ==
No.	Title	Directed by	Written by	Original release date
1	"The Wolf at the Door"	Corey Lubowich, Joey Richter, & Brian Rosenthal	Corey Lubowich, Joey Richter, & Brian Rosenthal	October 13, 2020
Artemis (Mary Kate Wiles) and her twin brother, Paul (Steve Zaragoza), have their eyes on the coveted hosting position for the hit anthology podcast Wayward Guide for the Untrained Eye. But on the day of the big pitch to their boss Lesly (Sean Astin), they are derailed by an unexpected visit from a paranoid yokel (Darren Criss) claiming a massive conspiracy in his small mining town of Connor Creek.
2	"Welcome to Connor Creek"	Corey Lubowich, Joey Richter, & Brian Rosenthal	Corey Lubowich, Joey Richter, & Brian Rosenthal	October 20, 2020
Artemis and Paul begin to interview the town’s oddballs and eccentrics to gain some insight into the upcoming town council election. The discovery of a mysterious book leads the Schue-Horyn twins to suspect that there may be paranormal forces at play.
3	"Miner Setback"	Corey Lubowich, Joey Richter, & Brian Rosenthal	Corey Lubowich, Joey Richter, & Brian Rosenthal	October 27, 2020
Artemis tries to find a connection between the town’s recent tragedy and a slick mining executive (Titus Makin). Meanwhile, Paul’s radical theory about werewolves creates a rift between him and his sister, leading to a dangerous investigation of his own.
4	"On the Trail"	Corey Lubowich, Joey Richter, & Brian Rosenthal	Corey Lubowich, Joey Richter, & Brian Rosenthal	November 3, 2020
Artemis offends candidate Truman Hensley (Cassie Silva) after making a brash decision at a town hall meeting. Paul’s suspicion that werewolves are behind the recent attacks grows stronger as he recovers from an eventful night.
5	"Crying Wolf"	Corey Lubowich, Joey Richter, & Brian Rosenthal	Corey Lubowich, Joey Richter, & Brian Rosenthal	November 10, 2020
Artemis makes a hair-raising discovery in the woods surrounding Connor Creek. Following the town council election, another gruesome attack causes pandemonium in the town.
6	"Elective Memory"	Corey Lubowich, Joey Richter, & Brian Rosenthal	Corey Lubowich, Joey Richter, & Brian Rosenthal	November 17, 2020
With the town on high alert for werewolves, Artemis and Paul’s interviews take on a new tone. Panic turns to hysteria as this threat is put on full display at an emergency town council meeting.
7	"Grin and Bare It"	Corey Lubowich, Joey Richter, & Brian Rosenthal	Corey Lubowich, Joey Richter, & Brian Rosenthal	November 24, 2020
Sheriff Madison is nominated to head up a werewolf hunting task force as the town turns against the Schue-Horyns. Several locals make a startling confession as they attempt to ally.
8	"In Sheep's Clothing"	Corey Lubowich, Joey Richter, & Brian Rosenthal	Corey Lubowich, Joey Richter, & Brian Rosenthal	December 1, 2020
Artemis follows her primary lead to confront the mastermind behind the werewolf attacks, only to realize that she has missed a major detail in the case.
9	"Belly of the Beast"	Corey Lubowich, Joey Richter, & Brian Rosenthal	Corey Lubowich, Joey Richter, & Brian Rosenthal	December 8, 2020
With the truth finally out in the open, Paul constructs a cockamamie plan to save the town with the help of an unexpected ally hidden in plain sight.
10	"New Moon"	Corey Lubowich, Joey Richter, & Brian Rosenthal	Corey Lubowich, Joey Richter, & Brian Rosenthal	December 15, 2020
Answers are revealed as Connor Creek catches up to its feral history. Back at APN, Artemis and Paul deal with the repercussions of their story.

== Production ==
=== Development ===
A teaser-trailer for the series and podcast was released on Tin Can Brothers' YouTube channel on September 22, 2020. Team Starkid, a sister channel of the Tin Can Brothers, released a second announcement video for the series on September 30, 2020.

=== Casting ===
In the Tin Can Brothers' announcement video, the full cast was announced. Darren Criss, Lauren Lopez, Joey Richter, and Dylan Saunders were seen during the video.

=== Filming ===
Principal Photography began in Los Angeles, California in summer 2017.

== Release ==
The first four episodes premiered at a drive-in hosted by Tin Can Brothers on October 12, 2020.

The first episode of the series was uploaded to YouTube on October 13, 2020. The video was viewed by 15K watchers on the premiere date. The first part of the podcast series was released on October 16, 2020.
