= A Very Potter Sequel =

Harry Potter parody musical

- AVPS soundtrack art
- Music: Darren Criss
- Lyrics: Darren Criss
- Book: Matt Lang; Nick Lang; Brian Holden
- Basis: Harry Potter by J. K. Rowling
- Productions: 2010 University of Michigan

A Very Potter Sequel (often shortened to AVPS) is a musical with music and lyrics by Darren Criss and a book by Matt Lang, Nick Lang, and Brian Holden. The story is a parody, based on several of the Harry Potter novels (particularly Harry Potter and the Philosopher's Stone, Harry Potter and the Prisoner of Azkaban and Harry Potter and the Order of the Phoenix) by J. K. Rowling, as well as their film counterparts.

A Very Potter Sequel picks up where A Very Potter Musical left off with Lord Voldemort destroyed. Lucius Malfoy then decides to go back in time to Harry Potter's first year at Hogwarts to destroy him before he becomes a bigger threat than he already is.

The musical was performed May 14-16, 2010, on the University of Michigan campus. It was produced by StarKid Productions and directed by Matt Lang. The musical starred Darren Criss as Harry Potter, Joey Richter as Ron Weasley, Bonnie Gruesen as Hermione Granger, Lauren Lopez as Draco Malfoy, and Joe Walker as Dolores Umbridge. The video version of the musical premiered in its entirety at Infinitus, a Harry Potter convention. The video premiered on YouTube July 22, 2010, and within two days had gotten over 160,000 views, making the StarKid Productions page the most viewed of the day.

A Very Potter Sequel is followed by A Very Potter Senior Year.

== Synopsis ==
=== Act I ===
Lucius Malfoy and Yaxley meet to discuss Lord Voldemort's defeat at the hands of Harry Potter. Lucius describes that if it were not for Harry Potter, they would be reigning supreme. Lucius then explains his plan to use a Time Turner to go back in time to Harry's first year at Hogwarts to destroy him before he can become a threat for the Death Eaters ("Not Over Yet").

In the past, Harry Potter shows up at King's Cross station for his first year at Hogwarts and cannot seem to find Platform 9¾. He then meets the Weasleys, who help him find the way. In the midst of this, Harry meets Ron Weasley and the two quickly become the best of friends. Ron and the others at Platform 9¾ discover who Harry is and begin to treat him like a celebrity. Harry asks Ron why they are acting this way toward him, and Ron tells Harry that he is "The Boy Who Lived", as he survived the Killing Curse and defeated Voldemort as a child. Rita Skeeter also tells Harry about the murderer Sirius Black, who betrayed his parents and is now after his life ("Harry Freakin' Potter").

On the Hogwarts Express, Harry and Ron meet Hermione Granger. Meanwhile, a Death Eater knocks out the candy lady and attempts to use the Killing Curse on Harry, but is disarmed by Remus Lupin, who is the new Defence Against the Dark Arts teacher at Hogwarts. As the train arrives at Hogwarts, Lupin tells Harry not to go looking for trouble. At this point, Harry is introduced to Severus Snape, who instantly takes a disliking to Harry, but Lupin stands up for Harry and Snape flees. Lupin leaves Harry after mentioning that his parents spent the best years of their lives at Hogwarts, leading Harry to believe he has finally found a home ("To Have a Home").

After Harry, Ron, and Hermione are sorted by the Scarf of Sexual Preference (or "Scarfy") into "Metrosexual", "Bi-curious", and "Waiting 'til marriage", respectively, and by the Sorting Hat (or "Sorty") into Gryffindor house together, they meet Slytherin Draco Malfoy, who wants to be Harry's friend very badly, and tells his associates Vincent Crabbe and Gregory Goyle to torture Ron and Hermione until he agrees. Hogwarts headmaster Albus Dumbledore arrives to cease the fighting and welcome everyone to Hogwarts. Dumbledore then introduces the House Cup and "the silliest of all wizard sports", Quidditch. Dumbledore introduces Lupin and Snape as the coaches of the Gryffindor and Slytherin Quidditch teams, respectively. As Snape begins to taunt Lupin about the full moon, Lupin begins to take on a werewolf transformation and runs away. Dumbledore then introduces the terrifying and musclebound professor Dolores Umbridge, who has been assigned by the Ministry of Magic to keep Harry and the rest of the school safe from Sirius Black. Snape escorts the boys to their dorm, and Dumbledore tells Harry he should be proud to be in Gryffindor, like himself and his parents were. Umbridge is left to instruct the girls on the rules of the dormitory, but intimidates them into submission.

Harry and Ron go to try out for the Gryffindor Quidditch team, but before they can begin practicing, Snape shows up and he and Lupin argue over which team has the field reserved for the day. The two go to see Dumbledore to settle the matter. Meanwhile, Draco approaches Harry to boast about a picture he drew of him. Hermione attempts to stand up for Harry, but the tables are turned on her as everyone makes fun of her for not being able to draw ("Hermione Can't Draw"). Lupin returns to tell the team that he messed up the schedule, but no one seems to care as they are all having too much fun making fun of Hermione. Hermione wishes she could show everyone who she really is ("The Coolest Girl").

The students of Hogwarts are taking a field trip to Hogsmeade, but Harry does not have a signed permission form, so Umbridge decides to harshly punish him. Fortunately for Harry, Neville Longbottom shows up to give Umbridge flowers from "Big D," which puts her in a much better mood. Harry is still not allowed to go, but he manages to escape Umbridge's wrath. Draco also does not have a permission form, so he stays behind to write a letter to his father. Harry meets up with Lupin, who gives him the Marauder's Map so that he can go secretly to Hogsmeade without a permission slip, but advises him not to go to the Shrieking Shack.

Umbridge has become a lot less strict with rules after finding out she has a secret admirer, who is revealed to be Dumbledore. The two then begin a flirtatious relationship ("Gettin' Along"), and after sweeping "Mr. Umbridge" off her feet, Dumbledore spirits Umbridge away to make love. Meanwhile, the kids are swapping horrific stories about Sirius Black in Hogsmeade, which ends with Hermione being dared to go to the Shrieking Shack and draw a picture of the monster inside. The other kids are scared off by a werewolf howl. When Harry arrives, he convinces Ron that they must go in to save her. They manage to find her, but are then attacked by a werewolf. Harry fends it off by throwing Hermione's cat Crookshanks at it as bait. The group flees into the Forbidden Forest, where they each discuss their flaws, but because they are at Hogwarts, those flaws do not matter. Harry and Ron finally accept Hermione as their friend. Suddenly, the werewolf returns, but Firenze arrives to save the trio and brings them back to Hogwarts.

While everyone is preparing for the Quidditch match, Neville and Rita Skeeter find Lupin half-naked and covered in blood in the woods with the body of a dead doe, which he claims is part of a pre-game ritual. Meanwhile, Dumbledore tells Snape of his evening with Umbridge, which quickly became a disaster when Dumbledore realized Umbridge was actually a woman. Contrary to this, Umbridge has become very clingy to Dumbledore, but when Snape and Dumbledore break the news to her, she goes back to being her old self, declaring that she will destroy Dumbledore and take his job as headmaster of Hogwarts. Lucius (from the future), arrives to meet with Snape, stating he has a lot riding on the Quidditch match, and replaces the majority of the Slytherin team with Death Eaters in order to kill Harry.

The Quidditch match finally begins ("Let the Games Begin"). At half-time, Hedwig shows up with a package for Harry, but Lucius intercepts it. Hermione manages to get it back by cursing Lucius. Lupin scolds the Gryffindor team for their sloppy playing, but Hermione arrives to give Harry his package, which turns out to be just what he needs: a Firebolt broomstick. Draco accidentally interferes with the Death Eaters' attempt on Harry's life and Harry manages to catch the Golden Snitch, winning the game for Gryffindor. Lucius is furious with Draco and crumples up the drawing Draco had made for him, disowning him.

Hermione prepares to leave Hogwarts for the holidays and gives Harry and Ron a scrapbook of their first semester at Hogwarts, including a newspaper clipping about Sirius Black that mentions Harry. Snape charges into the room screaming that Sirius Black has infiltrated Hogwarts. Harry becomes enraged after being reminded that Sirius was the man responsible for his parents' murder and decides to go find him using the Marauder's Map. The map leads Harry, Ron, and Hermione to a room containing a large mirror. As Harry approaches the mirror, he sees two mysterious figures in it. Sirius Black reveals himself and explains that it is the Mirror of Erised, which shows one's deepest desires. In the case of both Harry and Sirius, it shows Harry's parents. Sirius explains that he was framed for the murder of Harry's parents, so Harry and Sirius reconcile ("Those Voices"). Sirius then tells the trio that someone named "Little D" helped him escape from Azkaban prison and made his way to Hogwarts. Sirius also gives Harry his father's Cloak of Invisibility as well as telling him that it was he who sent the Firebolt. Hermione sees someone coming on the Marauder's Map, so Sirius tries to throw the Invisibility Cloak over the trio, but Harry ends up putting it on Sirius. Snape arrives and begins taking his anger out on Harry, forcing Sirius to reveal himself. After the two trade insults about how Harry's mother chose James over Snape, Dumbledore and Umbridge show up. Umbridge tries to take Harry, Ron, and Hermione to Azkaban for helping Sirius get into Hogwarts, but Dumbledore tells her that it was he who helped Sirius get in. Umbridge then presents an ultimatum: "Either kiss the dementors, or kiss Umbridge". Desperate, Dumbledore Disapparates with Scarfy, leaving Umbridge to take over Hogwarts. As she corrals Harry, Ron, Hermione, and Sirius away, Snape looks in the Mirror of Erised and sees Lily.

=== Act II ===
Everyone is shaken up by all the new regulations instated by Umbridge, including cancelling the Valentine's Day Dance, removing the moving paintings, and having the Ghostbusters chase away all the ghosts in the school, as well as put strict regulations on what the professors are allowed to teach. Lupin tries to cheer everyone up by teaching them a spell to ward off Dementors, called the Patronus Charm. Umbridge interrupts the lesson and fires Lupin due to not following the proper curriculum or even the assigned textbook (to which Lupin replies "That textbook is like a thousand years old! It still refers to dementors as ringwraiths.") Lupin leaves, much to Snape's delight, but apologizes to him for making fun of him when they were children. Umbridge takes the position of Professor of Defense Against the Dark Arts, and introduces "Mama's Little Love Hand", which she threatens them with. Hermione tries to stand up to Umbridge, but Umbridge sees her as herself at her age and promises to mold her in her image, starting by punishing her first. The whole class then stands up for Hermione and Snape decides to step in and take them to Potions class. Umbridge gives up but gives the class detention. She then asks Harry where Dumbledore is hiding, but Harry tells her that even if he did know he wouldn't tell her.

Umbridge is having a good time teasing the Sorting Hat and replacing Dumbledore's Zac Efron poster with one of Taylor Lautner, but still has her doubts about being liked. She is then visited by the spirit of her dead mother who whips Umbridge into shape, and convinces her to kill the students of Hogwarts. Umbridge calls Snape to her office to ask him to kill Harry for her. Lucius also arrives and suggests that he and Umbridge team up to capture Dumbledore and kill Harry. Snape threatens to report their planning to the Ministry of Magic, but Lucius convinces him otherwise by showing Snape his memories of James and Lily Potter using the Pensieve to show him the type of people the Potters really are ("Guys Like Potter").

The students read in The Daily Prophet that Sirius has been sentenced to death, and Umbridge will now have Dementors surrounding Hogwarts full-time. While most of the first years are ordered to clean the Owlery, Harry is asked to come to Umbridge's office alone. When Harry arrives, Lucius appears from the shadows and attacks him. As the others are cleaning, Ron assures Hermione that she is nothing like Umbridge (using Spider-Man as an analogy like in the first show), and hints that he may have a crush on her. They are interrupted by a message from "Little D," who wants to meet them in order to save Harry. "Little D" is revealed to be Draco, but this Draco is from the future like Lucius. Draco explains that Lucius came back in time to kill Harry and that he, Draco, was actually the one behind helping Sirius escape from Azkaban and having Firenze save Harry and company from the werewolf. Harry wakes up to find Lucius and the Death Eaters preparing to torture him and that Lucius and Umbridge have formed an alliance. Ron, Hermione, and Draco enter the room disguised as Death Eaters and manage to free Harry. Lucius grabs Draco, but Snape enters and saves them, allowing the children to escape.

Harry and company free Sirius and Lupin returns to help. Lupin and Sirius explain that their and James' supposedly deceased friend Peter Pettigrew, who was disguised as a nearby Taylor Lautner poster, was actually behind the crimes Sirius was accused of. Ron tricks Pettigrew by offering him a Red Vine and the group captures him. As the group prepares to head to the Ministry of Magic to turn Pettigrew in, Lupin sees the full moon and becomes a werewolf. Pettigrew uses this as a distraction to get away. Lupin attacks Sirius, but suddenly, werewolf calls emanate from the Forbidden Forest, causing Lupin to chase after them. As the kids tend to Sirius, Umbridge appears, determined to finally punish them. Dumbledore returns and stands up to Umbridge, announcing that he is gay and will use force if necessary to end her reign of terror. Umbridge is too strong, however, and refuses to back down ("Stutter"). Harry tries to save Sirius from the Dementors, but passes out.

Dumbledore manages to get the kids out of danger, but tells them to stay put while he goes to search for help. Harry and the others feel all is hopeless, but Draco remembers that he has Lucius' Time Turner, which the group uses to travel back in time one hour. Harry meets up with the past Snape and inspires him to save Harry and friends later on during the fight with Lucius. Ron is still discouraged of their chances for victory, but Harry boosts the group's morale by convincing them that there is a way ("No Way"). Harry and the others run into Lucius, but Draco stands up to him at last and recruits Yaxley to their side. Lucius, however, shocks Draco with a horrible secret: he is not his real father. Years ago, his wife had an affair with their house-elf, Dobby, which resulted in Draco's birth. Lucius gets free and tortures Hermione, making her howl in pain. Before he is able to kill her, Lupin shows up in his werewolf form and kills him.

Harry and the others then arrive at the scene of Umbridge and her dementors just as Dumbledore disapparates with their past selves. They each use the Patronus Charm to scare off the Dementors. Harry is about to take Umbridge down when she grabs hold of him. Firenze arrives just in time to save him and fights an epic battle with Umbridge, which ends with Firenze falling in love with Umbridge's brute incredible strength and taking her as a mate to save the dying race of centaurs.

Harry, Lupin, and the others provide evidence to clear Sirius' name. Sirius and Lupin, both jobless and homeless, decide to travel the world together. The rest of the people at Hogwarts decide to have a huge party to celebrate ("Hermione Can't Draw (Reprise)"). The future Draco tells Hermione he is not going with as he could run into his past self, causing a temporal paradox. Before he leaves, he confesses his love for Hermione, but she shoots him down. However, Draco meets Luna Lovegood, and the two bond over Pigfarts, the wizarding school on Mars. In Dumbledore's office, the Sorting Hat and Scarfy are reunited and they both decide to get married. Harry visits Dumbledore and the two discuss that their days away from Hogwarts are what make the time they have there so precious. Harry and the others all say goodbye for the summer, knowing that there will always be a way back. ("Days of Summer"/"Goin' Back to Hogwarts").

== Notable casts ==
Character	University Of Michigan 2010
Harry Potter	Darren Criss
Ron Weasley	Joey Richter
Hermione Granger	Bonnie Gruesen
Draco Malfoy	Lauren Lopez
Dolores Umbridge / Lord Voldemort	Joe Walker
Severus Snape	Joe Moses
Remus Lupin	Brian Holden
Albus Dumbledore	Dylan Saunders
Lucius Malfoy	Tyler Brunsman
Gregory Goyle / Firenze / Bill Weasley	Jim Povolo
Rita Skeeter / Ginny Weasley	Jaime Lyn Beatty
Sirius Black	Nicholas Joseph Strauss-Matathia
Yaxley	Corey Dorris
Cho Chang / Charlie Weasley	Devin Lytle
Lily Potter / Luna Lovegood / Hedwig / Fred Weasley	Arielle Goldman
Seamus Finnigan / James Potter	Brian Rosenthal
Dean Thomas	Britney Coleman
Molly Weasley / Pansy Parkinson	Lily Marks
Neville Longbottom	Richard Campbell
Lavender Brown / George Weasley	Sango Tajima
Vincent Crabbe / Percy Weasley	Julia Albain
Arthur Weasley / Sorty / Scarfy / Peter Pettigrew	Nick Lang

== Musical numbers ==
Act I

- "Not Over Yet" – Lucius and Ensemble
- "Harry Freakin' Potter" – Ron, Harry, Rita, and Company
- "To Have a Home" – Harry
- "Hermione Can't Draw/Lupin Can't Sing" – Harry and Company
- "The Coolest Girl" – Hermione
- "Gettin' Along" – Dumbledore and Umbridge
- "Let the Games Begin" – Company
- "Those Voices" – Harry, Sirius, James, and Lily

Act II

- "Guys Like Potter" – Lucius and Snape
- "Stutter" – Umbridge
- "No Way" – Harry, Draco, Ron, and Hermione
- "Hermione Can't Draw (Reprise)" – Company
- "Days of Summer" – Harry, Ron, Hermione, Draco, and Company
- "Goin' Back to Hogwarts" – Company

== Development ==
Similarly to A Very Potter Musical, Darren Criss had altered some of the songs he had already written in order to use them in the musical. The song "Guys Like Potter" was adapted from a song he had written about a friend named Peter, while "Days of Summer" was a running joke in StarKid Productions as it was a song originally written for the web series Little White Lie that ended up not being used until the Sequel. The song "Stutter" was also previously written by Criss, subsequently being used for the musical. The remaining songs in Sequel were written specifically for the show, and Criss wrote them all in about a month.

== Productions ==
A Very Potter Sequel was performed May 14-16th, 2010, on the University of Michigan campus. The video version of the musical premiered in its entirety at Infinitus, a Harry Potter convention. The video premiered on YouTube July 22, 2010.

== Recording ==
A formal cast recording of the musical was not released. However, the musical's songs were recorded by the cast and released on two separate albums. The first, A Very StarKid Album, was released alongside the YouTube premiere of A Very Potter Sequel on July 22, 2010, through iTunes and Amazon.com. The album features seven of the musical's twelve songs (excluding the "Hermione Can't Draw (Reprise)" and "Goin' Back to Hogwarts") along with other songs from members of StarKid. The album reached No. 19 on Billboard's Top Compilation Albums as well as reaching No. 14 on the iTunes Pop charts and No. 27 of all albums.

On July 31, 2010, StarKid released a supplementary EP through their Bandcamp account, titled the A Very Potter Sequel soundtrack. The EP features the remaining five songs from the musical. StarKid also released A Very StarKid Album on Bandcamp on August 3, 2010.

== Sequel ==
A third installment in the Very Potter franchise entitled A Very Potter Senior Year was performed at LeakyCon in 2012.

== See also ==
- Lists of musicals
