= Lauren Lopez =

American actress

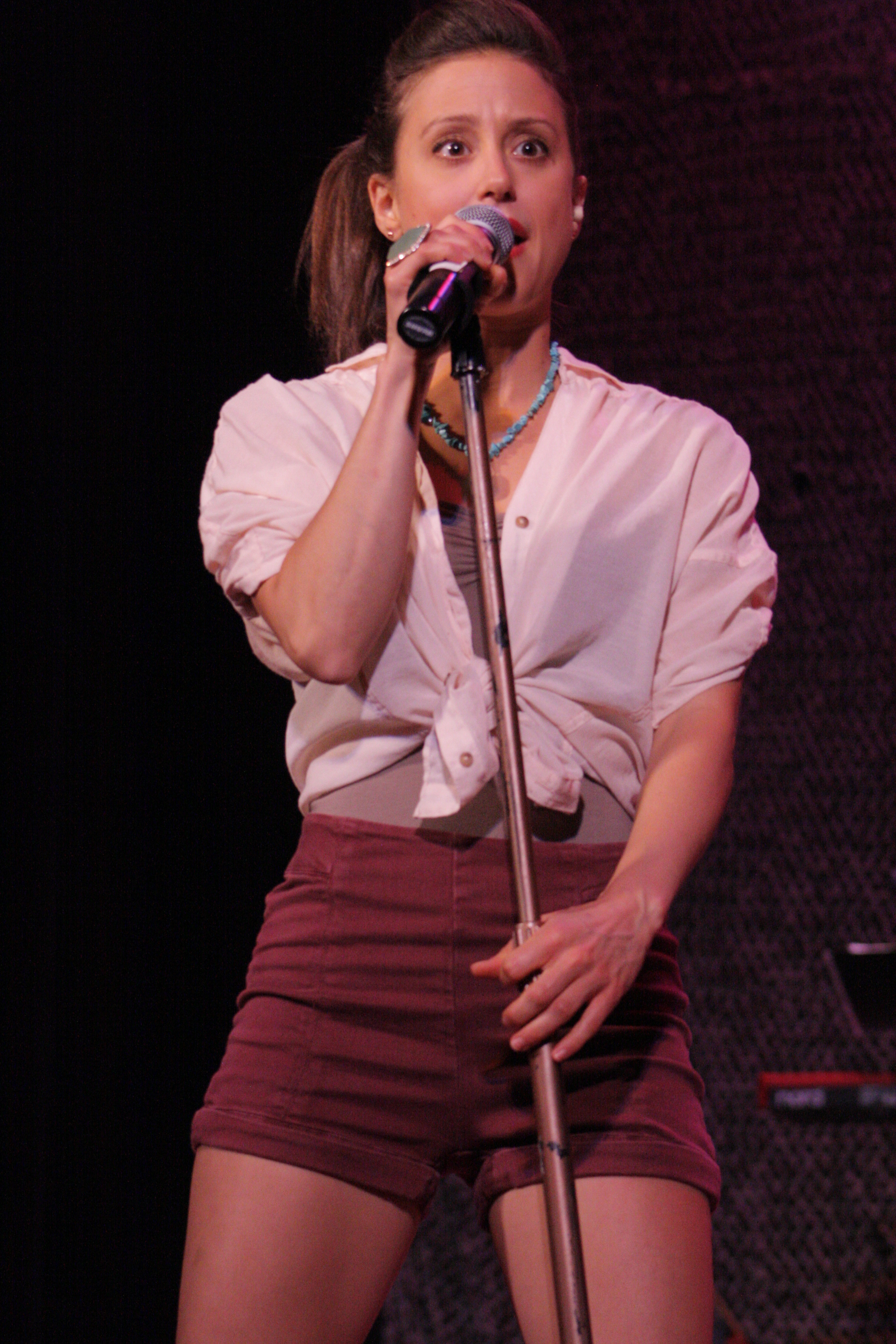
- Lopez in 2012
- Born: United States
- Education: University of Michigan
- Occupations: Actress; Singer
- Spouse: Joey Richter (m. 2023)
- Website: Official Website

Lauren Lopez is an American actress and singer best known for her involvement with American musical theatre company StarKid Productions.

== Early life and education ==
Lopez was born and raised in the suburbs of Michigan. She attended the University of Michigan, where she graduated in 2009 from the BFA acting program.

== Career ==
Lopez first entered the public eye for her performance as Draco Malfoy in A Very Potter Musical, a parody musical performed by University of Michigan students in 2009. Shortly afterward, the group formally organized as Team StarKid, and Lopez remained with group both as an actor and as a company manager. She joined the company for their SPACE and Apocalyptour tours in 2011 and 2012 respectively. She has remained involved in the group through 2026.

At the 2017 Hollywood Fringe Festival, Lopez took part in the all-female production of Shakespeare's The Tempest with the Say Yes Collective. In 2022, Lopez performed in a production at the Edinburgh Fringe Festival – Lottie Plachett Took A Hatchet, written by Justin Elizabeth Sayre.

In October 2023, Lopez joined Darren Criss as a special guest for his concert at the London Palladium, Darren Criss in Concert. She performed as part of StarKid's London Palladium concert in May 2024, marking StarKid's UK debut.

In May 2026, Lopez reprised her role as Emma Perkins et al in the West End production of The Guy Who Didn't Like Musicals. In addition to acting, she was the director of the production, which ran from 14-30 May at the Apollo Theatre.

== Personal life ==
Lopez owns a dog named Diane whom she adopted in 2016.

In 2020, Lopez announced her engagement and then-eight year relationship with fellow StarKid Productions member Joey Richter. They married in 2023 and currently reside in Los Angeles.

== In popular culture ==
A clip of Lopez's 2016 performance as Zazzalil singing “We Got Work to Do” in Firebringer became an internet meme.

== Roles ==
Year	Show	Role	Type	Ref
2009	A Very Potter Musical	Draco Malfoy	StarKid Productions	
2010	A Very Potter Sequel	Draco Malfoy	StarKid Productions	
2011	Starship	Taz / Buggette Buggington	StarKid Productions	
2012	Holy Musical B@man!	Commissioner Gordon, et al	StarKid Productions	
2012	A Very Potter Senior Year	Draco Malfoy	StarKid Productions	
2013	The Last Days of Judas Iscariot	Saint Monica / Mother Theresa	Regional	
2013	Twisted: The Untold Story of a Royal Vizier	Monkey / Ensemble	StarKid Productions	
2014	The Trail to Oregon!	Son	StarKid Productions	
2015	The Trail to Oregon!	Son	Off-Broadway	
2016	Firebringer	Zazzalil	StarKid Productions	
2016	Spies Are Forever	Cynthia Houston / Mrs. Mega / Ensemble	Tin Can Brothers	
2017	The Tempest	Caliban	Hollywood Fringe Festival	
2017	The Solve It Squad	Esther	Tin Can Brothers	
2018	The Solve It Squad	Esther	Off-Broadway	
2018	The Guy Who Didn't Like Musicals	Emma Perkins, et al.	StarKid Productions	
2019	Black Friday	Linda Monroe / Emma Perkins, et al.	StarKid Productions	
2020	Wayward Guide for the Untrained Eye	Agnes Florentine	Tin Can Brothers	
2022	Lottie Plachett Took A Hatchet	Lottie	Edinburgh Fringe Festival	
2023	Nerdy Prudes Must Die	Ruth Fleming, et al	StarKid Productions	
2023	VHS Christmas Carols	Emily Cratchit	StarKid Productions	
2024	Cinderella's Castle	Rancilda / Lucy / Ensemble	StarKid Productions	
2024	Monsters: The Lyle and Erik Menendez Story	Famous Actress	Netflix	
2025	Dirty Laundry	Herself	Dropout	
2025	Gross Prophets	April–May June	Tin Can Brothers	
2025	The Guy Who Didn't Like Musicals: Reprised!	Emma Perkins, et al. (Also Director)	Starkid Productions	
2026	The Guy Who Didn't Like Musicals: Reprised!	Emma Perkins, et al. (Also Director)	Starkid Productions & Lambert Jackson Productions	
2026	Inanimate Insanity	Strawberry	Adamation Inc.	

== Awards ==
Year	Award	Category	Show	Result	Ref
2019	BroadwayWorld Los Angeles Awards	Leading Actress in a Musical - Local	The Guy Who Didn't Like Musicals	Nominated	
