= Twisted (musical) =

Comedy musical

- The Untold Story of a Royal Vizier
- Twisted: The Untold Story of a Royal Vizier poster
- Music: A. J. Holmes
- Lyrics: Kaley McMahon
- Book: Matt Lang; Nick Lang; Eric Kahn Gale
- Basis: Aladdin by Ron Clements, John Musker, Ted Elliott, and Terry Rossio; Wicked by Stephen Schwartz and Winnie Holzman
- Premiere: July 4, 2013: Greenhouse Theater Center, Chicago
- Productions: 2013 Chicago

Twisted: The Untold Story of a Royal Vizier is a musical with music by A. J. Holmes, lyrics by Kaley McMahon, and a book by Matt Lang, Nick Lang, and Eric Kahn Gale, first produced by StarKid Productions.

A revisionist parody of the 1992 film Aladdin, the musical tells the film's story from the point of view of the film's villain, Jafar (spelled "Ja'far" in all official materials), in a nod to the musical Wicked, which told the familiar story of The Wonderful Wizard of Oz from the point of view of The Wicked Witch of the West. In addition to Aladdin and Wicked, the musical also parodies several other Disney films and stage musicals, as well as the history of The Walt Disney Company.

Twisted opened in Chicago's Greenhouse Theatre on July 4, 2013, and closed on July 28, 2013, as part of a limited run. The original production was directed by Brian Holden. The group put the entire musical up on YouTube on November 27, 2013. The musical's cast recording debuted at No. 63 on the American iTunes Top 100 albums chart.

== Plot ==
=== Prologue ===
Sherrezade introduces the audience to a Magic Kingdom (an analogue of The Walt Disney Company) that prospered for many years thanks to its commitment to "the two Ds: duty and devotion". Following a period of prosperity, the Kingdom fell into the hands of a corrupt sultan and entered a dark age. The only man who can rescue the Kingdom is the misunderstood royal vizier Ja'far.

=== Act I ===
Ja'far walks the streets of the Kingdom while the citizens jeer him. While Ja'far does his best to be a sensible and scientific planner, the citizens prefer to wish for their unrealistic dreams to come true and blame Ja'far for all their problems ("Dream a Little Harder"). Ja'far is informed by the captain of the guards that while attempting to pursue a thief who stole a loaf of bread, several men were injured or killed, and furthermore that the thief insulted visiting dignitary Prince Achmed. The selfish, shiftless and callous thief, Aladdin, explains his philosophy that everything in the world is his to steal ("I Steal Everything").

Ja'far returns to the palace but is greeted by Achmed; the ruler of the Kingdom of Pik-Zahr, angered by the Princess setting her pet tiger upon him. Insulted, Prince Achmed declares war on the Magic Kingdom. Ja'far berates the Princess for her carelessness while she naïvely longs for a life of freedom ("Everything and More").

Distraught to learn of his 2Ds department's sacking, Ja'far wrecks his room. He finds a scarab necklace that reminds him of the past when he was beloved by the citizens ("Sands of Time"). In an extended flashback, Ja'far teaches them about "The Golden Rule" of always treating others the way one wishes to be treated ("The Golden Rule"). On arriving at the vizier's palace for his first day as an assistant, Ja'far discovers that the vizier and his court are corrupt and only care about money ("The Golden Rule (Evil Reprise)"). Ja'far wonders if he will ever effect real change without the Sultan's audience. His mood is lifted when he meets the palace storyteller Sherrezade, who tells him stories including that of the Tiger Head Cave, which contains among other riches an oil lamp housing a wish-granting Djinn. Despite his skepticism of the stories, they fall in love and marry ("A Thousand and One Nights"). Months pass, and the Sultan finally gives Ja'far an audience; Sherrezade, now pregnant, accompanies him. The Sultan, a babbling fool who tells the court he inverted his penis, is immediately taken with Sherrezade and claims her as his concubine. Sherrezade gives Ja'far the scarab necklace and vows that they will be reunited one day. In the present, Ja'far sadly notes that she died before they could reunite. Though not fully convinced of the power of magic, Ja'far decides to seek out the Tiger Head Cave and the wish-granting Djinn ("If I Believed").

Meanwhile, the Princess meets Aladdin and is entranced by his free lifestyle and lack of respect for royalty, oblivious to his sexual advances. Aladdin explains that he never had a chance to become a valuable member of society since his parents died earlier in the year ("Orphaned at Thirty-Three"). Before they can kiss, they are caught by the royal guards, who throw Aladdin in prison and take the Princess home. Ja'far releases Aladdin on the condition he retrieves the Djinn's lamp from the Tiger Head Cave, claiming it to be an ordinary lamp. He also promises that Aladdin can keep all the other treasures he finds. The Princess, Aladdin, and Ja'far reflect on what they want most ("Happy Ending") before Aladdin exits the Tiger Head Cave and flees with the lamp, having discovered the Djinn and wanting it for himself, leaving Ja'far distraught.

=== Act II ===
Prince Achmed returns to the kingdom of Pik-Zahr and informs his soldiers of his meeting with the Princess (however, his soldiers misconstrue his story, believing that he had sexual intercourse with the Princess' tiger). Achmed despairs that he will only be remembered as a throwaway joke; though, believing that destroying the Princess' kingdom will win her affection, he and his soldiers march to war ("No One Remembers Achmed").

Ja'far has a heart-to-heart with the Princess about her future as a leader. Ja'far tries to warn her about Aladdin's true intentions but is called away when The Captain tells them that an unknown wealthy prince is leading a parade through the market, causing untold mayhem and injury. The prince visits the Princess, who immediately recognizes him as Aladdin. He nevertheless manages to convince her that the prince is his true persona. He takes the Princess on a magic carpet ride and unsuccessfully tries to convince her to have sex ("Take Off Your Clothes"). The Princess realizes that Aladdin's claimed great armies could help against Achmed's invasion. She proposes marriage, which Aladdin lustfully accepts.

The Sultan introduces his future son-in-law to Ja'far, who also immediately recognizes Aladdin and attempts to expose him as a fraud. Aladdin instead manages to convince the Sultan that Ja'far is a sorcerer who is using hypnosis, prompting the Sultan to sentence Ja'far to death. Ja'far grabs the lamp and escapes. Alone with the lamp, Ja'far is visited by various Disney villains from Sherrezade's tales. They claim they are not evil and that their stories have become "twisted" throughout the years (save for Cruella De Vil who everyone shuns). Ja'far accepts that he has to take the "twisted" path himself, or his sacrifices will have been for nothing, and uses the lamp ("Twisted").

Prince Achmed invades, and Aladdin and his army are nowhere to be found. Achmed calls for the head of the Sultan; Ja'far rises to challenge him, having used his first wish to become the Sultan. He releases the Djinn, who speaks entirely in movie quotes incomprehensible to Ja'far, and he uses his second wish to make himself a powerful sorcerer. The Princess finally realizes that Aladdin is a fraud, and rejects him. Aladdin takes the Princess hostage, and as Ja'far pleads with him to release her, he realizes that the Princess is his own daughter, as the Sultan's inverted penis would not have allowed him to have children. Aladdin reveals a darker, more sinister split-personality who murdered his parents when they attempted to force him out of their house to find a job. Ja'far agrees to hand over the lamp in exchange for the Princess, but before he does, he uses his final wish to free the Djinn and take its place in the lamp. Aladdin runs away in fear.

Ja'far, now a powerful Djinn, gives the lamp to the Princess, believing her youth and passion make her the only one who can use the lamp's power to its fullest potential. The Princess wishes to bring a peaceful end to the war with Pik-Zahr, and for the Kingdom to have a Sultan that will make it prosper again. Finally, she tries to wish that Ja'far did not have to return to the lamp, but he cannot grant that wish, so she instead wishes Ja'far happiness, and they part ways ("The Power In Me"). News arrives that the Sultan has died, naming the Princess the majority stockholder and sole ruler of the Kingdom. Achmed's troops arrive in the throne room, and the Princess buys the entirety of Pik-Zahr with Ali Baba's treasure, discovered during the battle. As her second act, the Princess brings full equality to the kingdom by making everyone in it a princess too.

In the lamp, Ja'far has resigned himself to his fate before suddenly being greeted by Sherrezade, brought back to life by the Princess's last wish. She explains that the lamp exists outside of time and space, which is how the Djinn had knowledge of movies from the future. Ja'far sees that Aladdin will become a Peddler who spends his days telling a warped version of the story, until his ironic death at the hands of a thief over a loaf of bread at the age of 55. The couple celebrate that they can spend eternity together ("Finale / A Thousand And One Nights Reprise").

== Cast and characters ==
Character	Original Chicago Cast 2013	Feinstein's/54 Below Concert 2014
Ja'far	Dylan Saunders	A.J. Holmes
Princess	Rachael Soglin	Andrea Ross
Aladdin	Jeff Blim	Jeff Blim
Prince Achmed / Vizier	Joe Walker	Rebecca Spigelman; Holly Grossman; George Salazar; Tyler Brunsman
Sultan / Djinn	Nick Gage	Rebecca Spigelman; Holly Grossman; George Salazar; Tyler Brunsman
Captain	Jim Povolo	Rebecca Spigelman; Holly Grossman; George Salazar; Tyler Brunsman
Sherrezade	Meredith Stepien	Rebecca Spigelman; Holly Grossman; George Salazar; Tyler Brunsman
Monkey / Ensemble	Lauren Lopez	Rebecca Spigelman; Holly Grossman; George Salazar; Tyler Brunsman
Bird / Ensemble	Denise Donovan	Rebecca Spigelman; Holly Grossman; George Salazar; Tyler Brunsman
Sea Witch / Ensemble	Jaime Lyn Beatty	Rebecca Spigelman; Holly Grossman; George Salazar; Tyler Brunsman
Ensemble	Robert Manion Alex Paul	Rebecca Spigelman; Holly Grossman; George Salazar; Tyler Brunsman

== Musical numbers ==
Act I

- "Dream a Little Harder" – Ja'far and Ensemble
- "I Steal Everything" – Aladdin and Ensemble
- "Everything and More" – Princess
- "Sands of Time" – Ja'far
- "The Golden Rule" – Ja'far and Ensemble
- "The Golden Rule (Evil Reprise)" – Vizier and Ensemble
- "A Thousand and One Nights" – Sherrezade and Ja'far
- "If I Believed" – Ja'far
- "Orphaned at Thirty-Three" – Aladdin
- "Happy Ending" – Ja'far, Aladdin, and Princess

Act II

- "No One Remembers Achmed" – Prince Achmed and Ensemble
- "Take off Your Clothes" – Aladdin and Princess
- "Twisted" – Ja'far and Ensemble
- "The Power in Me" – Princess and Ja'far
- "Finale (A Thousand and One Nights Reprise)" – Company

The official video of the original production ends with a faux-pop remix of "A Thousand and One Nights" performed by StarKid contributors Carlos Valdes and Britney Coleman.

== Development ==
Twisted was funded entirely via a Kickstarter campaign launched by creators Matt Lang, Nick Lang, and Eric Kahn Gale. The campaign opened with a fundraising goal of $35,000 and ended up raising $142,564.

Twisted was originally going to be a non-StarKid production, as it was felt by the members that A Very Potter Senior Year marked a fitting final musical for the group. However, while Eric Kahn Gale was setting up the Kickstarter page, he listed the company name of "StarKid Productions" believing this was for internal reference and would not be public-facing. When the page went live, it listed Team StarKid as the creator: Kahn Gale's mistake is credited by his collaborators and StarKid fans as having essentially saved the company.

== Productions ==
The musical was performed July 4–28, 2013, at the Greenhouse Theatre in Chicago, Illinois. The group put the entire musical up on YouTube on November 27, 2013. The recording has since received over 8.8 million views as of September 2025.

On March 17, 2014, the show was performed abridged in two sold-out concerts at 54 Below, with composer A. J. Holmes playing Ja'far and Andrea Ross playing the Princess. The production included an introduction by StarKid co-founder Darren Criss.

== Recordings ==
A cast recording of the production was released on November 28, 2013, on digital platforms. The recording included all songs (except "A Song is a Dick in Sheep's Clothing") as well as two instrumental cues, "Sultan's Fanfare" and "The Scarab".

A karaoke album was released on November 28, 2013, exclusively on iTunes.

An EP of bonus studio recordings and demos entitled Twisted: Twisted was released on December 4, 2013. The album was produced by Andrew Fox, Michael Hart, and Stacks of Wax Productions, and featured Andrea Ross, Britney Coleman, Carlos Valdes, and Cluster. In addition to multiple demos, it also features a punk version of "Everything and More" performed by Andrea Ross, a cover of "The Golden Rule" performed by a cappella group Cluster, and Pop/R&B versions of "Take Off Your Clothes" and "A Thousand and One Nights".

== Reviews ==
On Hypable, Danielle Zimmerman called it "smart, lively, and just outright hilarious".

== See also ==
- Lists of musicals
