= Joey Richter =

Actor and singer

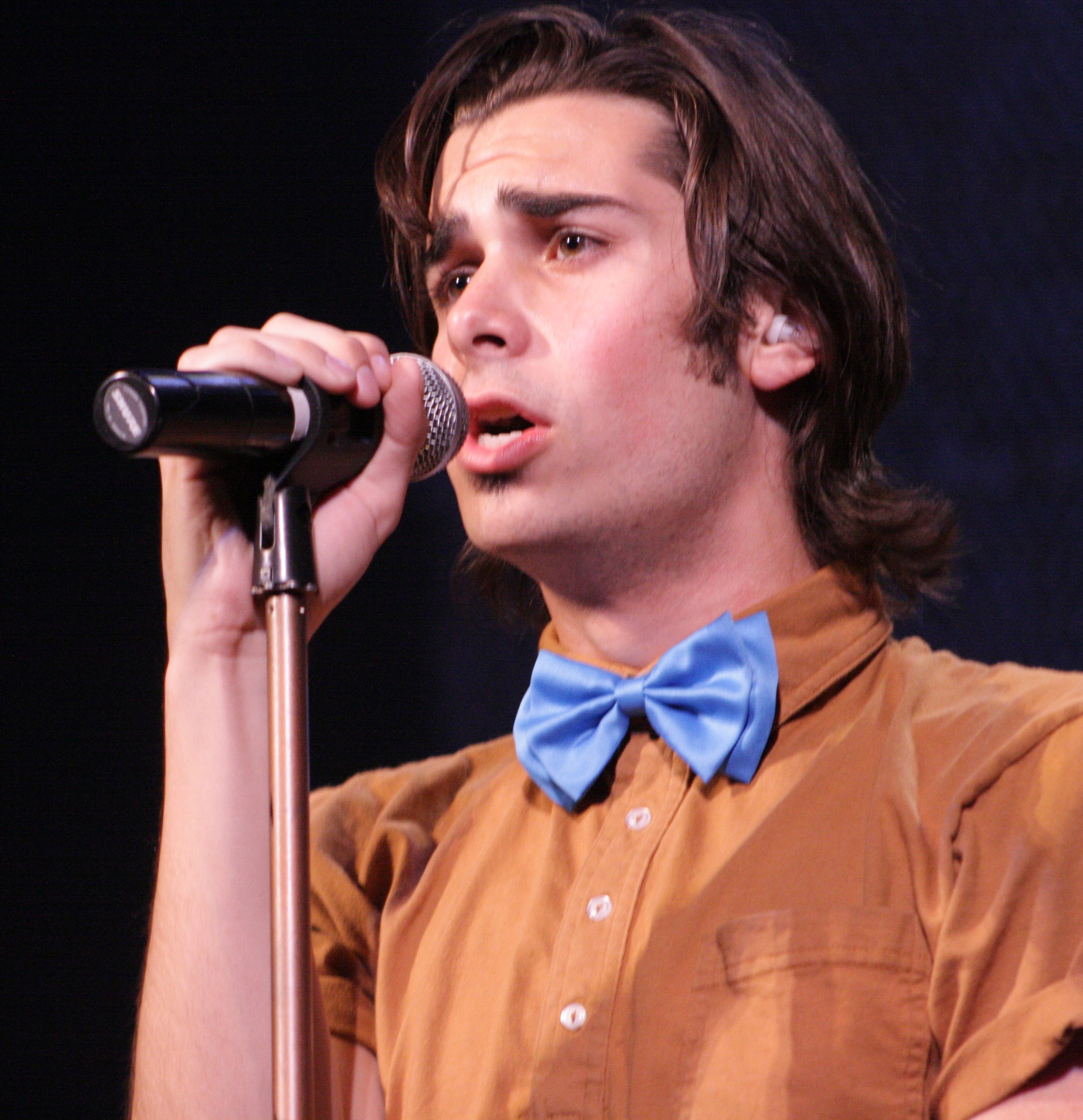
- Richter in 2012
- Born: Joseph Michael Richter; United States
- Education: University of Michigan
- Occupations: Actor, singer
- Spouse: Lauren Lopez (m. 2023)
- Website: joey-richter.com

Joseph Michael Richter is an American actor and singer. He is best known for his work with StarKid Productions, including A Very Potter Musical, as well as his work with Tin Can Brothers, including Spies Are Forever and Wayward Guide for the Untrained Eye.

== Early life and education ==
Richter grew up in Laguna Niguel, California. He graduated from the University of Michigan in 2011, receiving a Bachelor of Fine Arts in acting with a minor in global media studies.

== Career ==
In 2009, Richter went viral along with the rest of Team StarKid after they uploaded their Harry Potter parody musical, A Very Potter Musical, to YouTube; Richter played Ron Weasley. Richter has continued to appear in StarKid musicals over the last decade, with his most recent appearance being in the company's 2026 musical Tomb Quest. Richter also joined the company on their 2011 SPACE tour and 2012 Apocalyptour tour.

Richter is also a founding member of entertainment group Tin Can Brothers, alongside Corey Lubowich and Brian Rosenthal, whom he met while attending the University of Michigan. Richter has a writing credit for the group's 2016 musical Spies Are Forever, their 2017 play The Solve It Squad, and their 2020 webseries Wayward Guide for the Untrained Eye.

Richter appeared in Disney Channel's Jessie as recurring character Officer Petey. In 2013, he and Darren Criss co-hosted the Annie Awards. In 2015, Richter played Matt, the titular genie in the Nickelodeon TV movie Genie in a Bikini.

In October 2023, Richter joined Darren Criss as a special guest for his concert, Darren Criss in Concert, at the London Palladium.

== Personal life ==
Richter has been in a relationship with fellow StarKid Productions member Lauren Lopez since 2012. The couple became engaged in July 2020 and married in 2023. Fellow StarKid members Darren Criss and Dylan Saunders performed at the wedding, with Nick Lang, Joseph Walker and Julia Albain giving speeches.

== Acting roles ==
=== Theatre ===
Year	Title	Role	Venue	Notes	Ref.
2009	A Very Potter Musical	Ron Weasley	University of Michigan, Ann Arbor	StarKid Productions	
2009	Me and My Dick	Joey Richter	University of Michigan, Ann Arbor	StarKid Productions	
2009	Tartuffe	Orgon	University of Michigan, Ann Arbor	College production	
2010	A Very Potter Sequel	Ron Weasley	University of Michigan, Ann Arbor	StarKid Productions	
2011	Starship	Bug	Hoover-Leppen Theatre, Chicago	StarKid Productions	
2012	A Very Potter Senior Year	Ron Weasley	LeakyCon, Chicago	StarKid Productions	
2013	The Last Days of Judas Iscariot	Satan / Saint Thomas	Stage 773, Chicago	Chicago production	
2014	The Trail to Oregon!	McDoon / Ox / Ensemble	Stage 773, Chicago	StarKid Productions	
2015	The Trail to Oregon!	McDoon / Ox / Ensemble	Cherry Lane Theatre, New York City	StarKid Productions	
2016	Firebringer	Grunt	Stage 773, Chicago	StarKid Productions	
2016	Spies Are Forever	Owen Carvour / Sergio Santos / Vanger Borschtit / Ensemble	NoHo Arts Center, Los Angeles	Tin Can Brothers	
2017	The Solve it Squad	Benji "Scrags" Scragtowski	Secret Rose Theatre, Los Angeles	Tin Can Brothers	
2018	The Solve it Squad	Benji "Scrags" Scragtowski	TBG Theatre, New York City	Tin Can Brothers	
2018	The Guy Who Didn't Like Musicals	Ted, et al.	The Matrix Theatre, Los Angeles	StarKid Productions	
2019	Black Friday	The Homeless Guy / Uncle Wiley, et al.	Hudson Mainstage Theatre, Los Angeles	StarKid Productions	
2020	Social Distancing: The Musical!	Various	Pre-recorded virtual performance	Pixel Playhouse	
2020	A VHS Christmas Carol	Bob Cratchit	Pre-recorded virtual performance	StarKid Productions	
2021	VHS Christmas Carol: Live!	Bob Cratchit	The Bourbon Room, Los Angeles	StarKid Productions	
2023	Nerdy Prudes Must Die	Peter Spankoffski	El Portal Theater, Los Angeles	StarKid Productions	
2023	VHS Christmas Carols	Bob Cratchit / Fezziwig	Apollo Theater, Chicago	StarKid Productions	
2024	Cinderella's Castle	Crumb	El Portal Theater, Los Angeles	StarKid Productions	
2025	Gross Prophets	Todd Angle	Hudson Theater, Los Angeles	Tin Can Brothers	
2025	Gross Prophets	Todd Angle	Chapel Off-Chapel, Melbourne	Tin Can Brothers	
2025	Gross Prophets	Todd Angle	The Concourse Lounge, Sydney	Tin Can Brothers	
2025	Gross Prophets	Todd Angle	The Elysian Theater, Los Angeles	Tin Can Brothers	
2025	The Guy Who Didn't Like Musicals: Reprised!	Ted, et al.	El Portal Theater, Los Angeles	Starkid Productions	
2026	The Guy Who Didn't Like Musicals: Reprised!	Ted, et al.	The Apollo Theatre, London	Starkid Productions & Lambert Jackson Productions	

=== Film ===
Year	Title	Role	Notes	Ref.
2015	Genie in a Bikini	Matt	TV movie	

=== Television ===
Year	Title	Role	Notes	Ref.
2012–2013	Jessie	Officer Petey	Recurring role, 4 episodes	
2013	Glee	Apple No. 8	Episode: "Sadie Hawkins"	
2015–2020	Henry Danger	Time Jerker	Recurring role, 4 episodes	
2020–2021	Danger Force	Time Jerker	Recurring role, 2 episodes	
2026	Parlor Room	Himself	Episode: "Storytelling with Stakes"	
2026	Smartypants	Himself	4 episodes	

=== Voice acting ===
Year	Show / Film	Role	Episode	Ref
2013	Khumba	Themba		
2014	The Legend of Korra	Hong Li	Season 3, Episode 8 "The Terror Within”	
2020	Ride Your Wave	Minato		

== Awards and nominations ==
Year	Award	Category	Show	Role	Result	Ref
2019	BroadwayWorld Los Angeles Awards	Featured Actor in a Musical – Local	The Guy Who Didn't Like Musicals	Ted, et al.	Nominated	
