= The Trail to Oregon! =

2014 musical by Jeff Blim

- Logo
- Music: Jeff Blim
- Lyrics: Jeff Blim
- Book: Jeff Blim; Matt Lang; Nick Lang
- Basis: The Oregon Trail
- Productions: 2014 Chicago; 2015 Off-Broadway; 2018 Off-West End; 2018 Edinburgh Fringe; 2019 Duluth; 2023 Perth; 2025 Mérida

The Trail to Oregon! Is a musical with music and lyrics by Jeff Blim, and book by Jeff Blim, Matt Lang, and Nick Lang (additional music by Drew De Four).

The musical parodies the video game series The Oregon Trail. The characters' names were picked from suggestions shouted from the audience, and at the end the audience chooses which character dies.

== Productions ==
The musical was performed between July 3 and August 10, 2014, at Stage 773 in Chicago, Illinois. It ran for a total of 24 performances, and was performed in repertory with Ani, both being produced by StarKid Productions. With only six actors, it has the smallest cast of any StarKid musical to date. The group put the entire musical up on YouTube on February 14, 2015. The musical's cast recording was released on iTunes the same day.

The musical had a limited run at the Cherry Lane Theatre off-Broadway in New York City from May 26 to 31, 2015, running for eight performances. The original Chicago cast returned for this production. This marks the first time a StarKid show has received a full production in New York City.

The musical was also performed at The Other Palace off West End as part of their Edinburgh preview performances by the University of Southampton's touring theatrical group, Gone Rogue. This was followed by a run at the Edinburgh Festival Fringe from the August 13th-25th, 2018.

Trail to Oregon made its Western Australian debut in 2023 at the Don Russell Performing Arts Center by Art in Motion Theatre Company under the direction of Micheal Carroll, Musical Direction of Joshua Hollander and Choreography by Sophie David. The show ran from October 27th until November 4th and was a proven success receiving 8 Robert Finley Award Nominations and 2 award wins including: Best Ensemble, Best Director of a Musical, Best Musical Director, Best Actor in A Musical (Riley Merigan as McDoon/Everyone Else), 2x Best Actress (Verity Lux as Son [win] & Brittany Isaia as Daughter) as well as 2x Breakthrough Award nominations for Carroll and Hollander [win].

The musical was presented for the first time in México and Latin America in 2025 at the Foro Alternativo Rubén Chacón in Mérida, Yucatán by the theatre company Kiinova Teatro, under the direction of Adriana Rivera and Sergio Solís, Musical direction of Ramón Rodríguez, and produced by David Casanova. The next year, the show was followed by two performances at the Nina Shestakova Theatre at the city's Mérida Fest 2026 on January 10 and 11.

In January 2026 it was announced that Trail to Oregon would return to New York City with an Off-Off-Broadway production at Wild Project from March 14-22 by S&L Productions directed by Jack Villhard, Musical Direction by Max Polsky and Choreographed by Olivia Westhoff. This is a transfer of the LA production mounted at the Victory Theatre Center featuring the same cast; Steven Horn as Father, Hanna Eisenbath as Mother, Kat Lynch as Daughter, Scout Mayberry as Son, Roland Netzer as Grandpa, and Dillon Savage as McDoon/Everyone Else.

The show is available for licensing on the StarKid Productions website alongside other shows such as Twisted, Firebringer, The Guy Who Didn't Like Musicals, and Nerdy Prudes Must Die.

== Synopsis ==
=== Act I ===
The show begins with the father greeting the audience and introducing his wife, teenage daughter, seven-year-old son, and father-in-law (known as grandpa). The father leads the audience in choosing the name of each character. ("Gone To Oregon"). In the filmed show on YouTube the father is named Jack Bauer, the mother is named Slippery When Wet, the grandpa is named Titty Mitty, the son is named Craphole and the daughter is named Mouthface. Father tries to convince the kids that the journey to Oregon will be fun and educational, while Mother passive-aggressively points out that Father burned down their farm. The journey begins in Independence, Missouri, and the family walks through the town, receiving honest but depressing advice from the townspeople ("Independence!"). They decide to go down to the general store to buy only bullets (their reasoning being that as a family of farmers, they don't need any food).

Daughter is approached by a stranger named McDoon. As they flirt, he warns her about the famous outlaws The Bandit King and Cletus Jones. Upon hearing his name, Cletus appears and inadvertently reveals McDoon is the Bandit King. Mother arrives and scares McDoon away, much to the dismay of Daughter. As the women leave, McDoon vows revenge. In the meantime, the general store manager has swindled Father into purchasing a wagon in terrible condition for an outrageous price, along with a deformed ox.

They finally begin their journey, and while the rest of the family complain, Father enjoys the fun of the family road trip ("The Grind"). When the wagon breaks and the family discovers Son ate the food reserves, Mother sends Daughter, Son, and Grandpa to go hunting. After Daughter fails to hit small game, Grandpa hands the gun over the Son and tells his outlandish story about his war against the “lobsters” in 1812 - he claims to have banished the lobsters to the sea, for which the lobsters retaliated by stealing the only million-dollar bill in the world, as it had Grandpa's face on it. Son is faced with a family of buffalo and a moral decision, while Daughter and Grandpa try to convince him to kill ("Pays To Be An Animal"). After Son guns down the buffalo, the family drag what little meat they can carry back to the wagon.

After Daughter tells Mother that she thinks she is overbearing, Mother fakes death so that Daughter will admit she needs her. When Mother 'wakes up', Daughter claims she wishes she didn't have a family to care about and that the Bandit King would take her away. After she leaves, Mother laments her daughter's sadness, and expresses her love ("When The World's At Stake").

Father tries to convince Mother to have sex, but fails several times. She finally agrees, only to be bitten by a snake as soon as they get in the bed together. Father saves her by sucking out the venom, but accidentally poisons himself. While in a coma, he hallucinates a mysterious voice telling him that the 'watchers' (the audience) will kill off one of the family members ("Dysentery World"). The family assumes Father is dead. However, he abruptly awakens and tells them of the fate the voice described. McDoon is watching from afar, planning to take Daughter away and make her his bride, upsetting Cletus Jones (who has his own feelings for the thief). McDoon sets the family wagon on fire while Cletus kidnaps Daughter ("Wagon on Fire").

=== Act II ===
The show restarts with Daughter in the wagon of The Bandit King, missing her family ("Lost Without You"). Her family arrives at a pub, where Mother pays for her drink with her wedding ring. Mother takes Son and leaves the pub to walk to Oregon, while Father is left with Grandpa. Grandpa gives Father a pep talk, admitting that he left the lobster world in disgrace after losing the love of his life to the lobster and his best friend, Cornwallis. The General Store Guy then enters the pub. Father decides that he will do anything to get back his family and approaches The General Store Guy, demanding a working wagon. When he refuses, Father threatens to shoot him and his partner, because he needed to fix his family no matter what ("When The World's At Stake (Reprise)"). The General Store Guy gives Father his wagon. Father takes the new wagon on the trail, picking up Mother and Son on the way. Mother is overjoyed, and takes the reins, setting the pace to grueling and the rations to barebones ("Speedrun").

While the family races to Oregon, Cletus Jones reveals his jealousy to Daughter, who constantly rejects The Bandit King's advances. The trio come upon the Columbia River, and the bandits decide to float their wagon across the river ("Caulk The Wagon"). While in the river, they hit a rock that causes them to fall out. Daughter grabs onto a rock while the thieves are swept away. The family arrives just in time to see Daughter in the river. Father tells the family they will need to ford the river to save her. When Son protests, remembering a warning from an Independence town person, Mother declares they are a family. They manage to reach Daughter, but crash and wreck their wagon. Luckily, every member of the family is saved by Grandpa's lobster nemesis, Cornwallis.

The family is thrilled to see the Oregon border just a few yards away. When they reach the state line, they are stopped by a doctor (Joey Richter), who tells them only the healthy members of the party can continue to Oregon, and one of them (chosen earlier by the audience) is about to die of dysentery. The doctor announces the victim, who says their final goodbyes to the rest of the family, complete with all the sounds and smells of death by dysentery ("You Gotta Go").

Determined to reach Oregon as a family, the remaining members dragged the body across the border, and are amazed when the victim comes back to life thanks to the pure Oregon air (except in the case of Daughter and Mother, who were only pretending to be dead). Grandpa discovers his million-dollar bill in his pocket that the lobsters returned to him, and shares his fortune with his family. To celebrate, Son finally convinces the family to help realize his dream of skinny dipping ("Naked In A Lake").

== Cast and characters ==
Character	Stage 773 Chicago (2014)	Cherry Lane Theatre Off-Broadway (2015)	The Other Palace Off-West End (2018)	Edinburgh Festival Fringe (2018)	Stage 2 Theatre Company Duluth (2019)	Small Waves Production Company Duluth (2022)	Art In Motion Theatre Company Perth (WA) (2023)	Kiinova Teatro Mérida (2025)	Mérida Fest (2026)	The Victory Theatre Center (LA) (2025)	Wild Project Off-Off-Broadway (2026)
Father	Jeff Blim	Jeff Blim	Josh Vaatstra	Josh Vaatstra	Brendan Finn	Brendan Finn	Mathew Leak	Sergio Solís	Sergio Solís	Steven Horn	Steven Horn
Mother	Rachael Soglin	Rachael Soglin	Georgia Harper	Georgia Harper	Anna Matthes	Anna Matthes	Lukas Perez	Adriana Rivera	Adriana Rivera	Hanna Eisenbath	Hanna Eisenbath
Daughter	Jaime Lyn Beatty	Jaime Lyn Beatty	Gem Tunley	Gem Tunley	Haley Methner	Haley Methner	Brittany Isaia	Sofía Pinal / Rebeca Vega	Sofía Pinal / Rebeca Vega	Kat Lynch	Kat Lynch
Son	Lauren Lopez	Lauren Lopez	Bella Norris	Bella Norris	Rianna Ryan	Rianna Ryan	Verity Lux	Lilián Romero / Aixa Vicente	Lilián Romero / Aixa Vicente	Scout Mayberry	Scout Mayberry
Grandpa / Cletus Jones	Corey Dorris	Corey Dorris	John Wilders	John Wilders	Antony Ferguson	Antony Ferguson	Max Leunig	Isabel Cauich	Isabel Cauich	Roland Netzer	Roland Netzer
McDoon / Ensemble	Joey Richter	Joey Richter	James Adams	James Adams	Sam Hildestad	Sam Hildestad	Riley Merigan	Diego Magaña	Diego Magaña	Dillon Savage	Dillon Savage
Ox / Ensemble	Joey Richter	Joey Richter	James Adams	James Adams	Maddie Schafer	Maddie Schafer	Riley Merigan	Diego Magaña	Diego Magaña	Dillon Savage	Dillon Savage

== Musical numbers ==
Act I

- "Gone to Oregon" - Father, Mother, Daughter, Son, and Grandpa
- "Independence!" - Townspeople, General Store Guy, Mother, Father, and Company
- "The Grind" - Father, Mother, Daughter, Son, and Grandpa
- "Pays to Be an Animal" - Grandpa, Baby Buffalo, and Company
- "When the World's at Stake" - Mother
- "Dysentery World" - Father and Company
- "Wagon on Fire" - McDoon, Father, Mother, Son, Cletus Jones, and Company

Act II

- "Lost Without You" - Daughter
- "When the World's at Stake (Reprise)" - Father and General Store Guy
- "Speedrun" - Father, Mother, Son, and Grandpa
- "Caulk the Wagon" - McDoon, Cletus Jones, Daughter, and Backup Singers
- "You Gotta Go" - The Deceased Family Member (Depends on who the audience picks)
- "Naked in a Lake" - Son and Company

== See also ==
- Lists of musicals
