= Britney Coleman =

American musical theatre actress

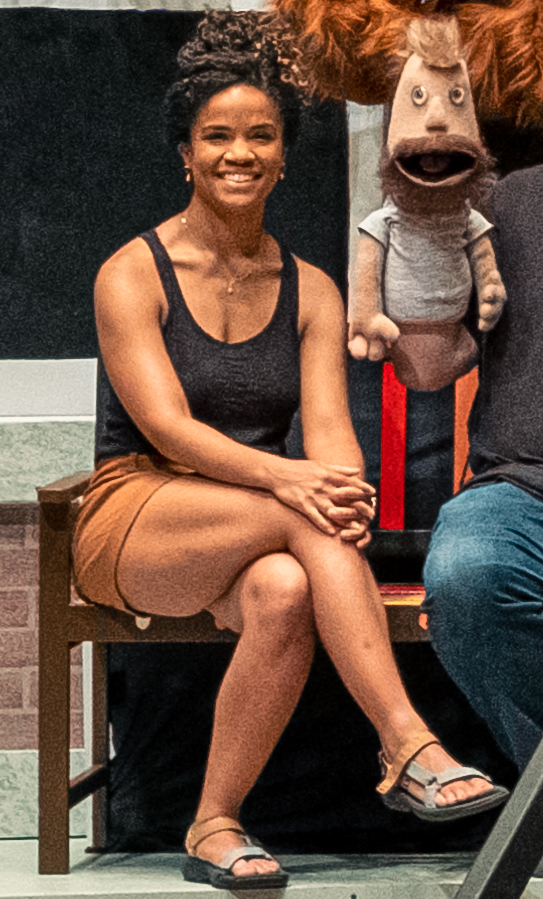
- Coleman in 2022
- Born: January 23, 1989 (age 37); Ann Arbor, Michigan, U.S.
- Education: University of Michigan (BFA)
- Website: www.britneycoleman.com

Britney Coleman (born January 23, 1989) is an American actress and singer.

== Early life and education ==
Coleman is a native of Ann Arbor, Michigan. She attended the University of Michigan. where she received a BFA in Musical Theatre. While in college, she played Bellatrix Lestrange in the cult classic internet musical A Very Potter Musical.

== Career ==
Coleman played the role of Barbara Maitland in the Beetlejuice first national tour. After, she led the gender-bent national tour of Company in 2024 to critical acclaim.

On June 16, 2026, she is set to lead the developmental reading of One Way, a "queer, anti-billionaire space musical" following a retired astronaut who must decide between a one-way trip to Mars and staying on Earth with the woman she loves.

== Theatre ==
Year	Show	Type	Role	Ref
2009	A Very Potter Musical	StarKid Productions	Bellatrix Lestrange	
2010	A Very Potter Sequel	StarKid Productions	Dean Thomas	
2012	A Very Potter Senior Year	StarKid Productions performed at LeakyCon	Bellatrix Lestrange	
2015	Beautiful: The Carole King Musical	Broadway	Lucille	
2017	Sunset Boulevard	Broadway	Heather	
2019	Tootsie	Broadway	Susie	
2023	Beetlejuice	National tour	Barbara Maitland	
2024	Company	National tour	Bobbie	
2026	The Curious Case of Benjamin Button	Off-Broadway	Gwyns/Trenlee Senior/Captain Carrick	
