= Ani (musical) =

Parody play with music

- A Parody
- Music: Clark Baxtresser; Pierce Siebers
- Book: Matt Lang; Nick Lang
- Setting: Star Wars universe: Death Star and Tatooine, c. 1 BBY
- Basis: Star Wars
- Premiere: 3 July 2014: Stage 773, Chicago
- Productions: 2014 Chicago

Ani: A Parody is a play written by Matt Lang and Nick Lang with music by Clark Baxtresser and Pierce Siebers. The musical parodies Star Wars. "Ani" was the childhood nickname of Anakin Skywalker; it also alludes to the musical Annie and The Who's concept album Tommy.

== Production history ==
The musical was performed between July 3 and August 10, 2014, at Stage 773 in Chicago, Illinois. It ran for a total of 22 performances, and was performed in repertory with The Trail to Oregon!, both being produced by StarKid Productions. The group uploaded the musical in its entirety to YouTube on October 31, 2014. The musical's cast recording was released on iTunes the same day. The cast recording reached #4 on Billboard's Comedy Albums the week of November 22, 2014.

== Synopsis ==
The story takes place shortly before the events of the 1977 film Star Wars.

=== Act I ===
A voiceover plays over of an announcer (Brian Holden) narrating the win of Ani at a pod race. An Imperial officer (Eric Kahn Gale) comes in and prompts him, calling him "Lord Vader". Vader turns around and tells the officer to call him "Ani" (Chris Allen) ("Ani"). The officer asks Ani how he's doing and Ani replies that he was looking out into space, thinking about the good old days. He wistfully adds that the thing about the good old days is that you don't know that you're in them until they're gone. Ani asks why he came around and the officer tells him that he's late for a meeting with other Imperial officers. The Imperial officers, led by Moff Jeffrey Tarkin (Joe Walker) discuss their plans for the Death Star.

Ani arrives late at the meeting, much to the annoyance of the others, and presents various Star Wars joke pitches. The officers mock Ani's ideas, causing Ani to force choke them before apologizing. Ani and Tarkin take a walk together and see Emily, a stormtrooper who Tarkin has a crush on. Ani embarrasses Tarkin in front of her, causing Tarkin to yell at him in anger. An upset Ani trashes his room ("Long Ago and Far Away").

Mara Jade, an imperial assassin and the Emperor's new apprentice, arrives on the Death Star to replace Ani. Ani befriends her and tells her about his love for pod racing, and she shares with him her dream of becoming a slave girl in the palace of Jabba the Hutt. The two of them convince each other to run away to Tatooine and pursue their dreams.

The Emperor, referred to as "Pappy", arrives on the Death Star with a Star Wars lego set as a gift for Ani. Tarkin discovers that Ani has run off and distracts Pappy by telling him to build the lego set himself. Tarkin and Emily set off for Tatooine in order to persuade Ani to come back, knowing that Tarkin will lose his job if he fails.

On Tatooine, Ani visits his old haunts ("Strike Back") and reunites with old friends like Boba Fett ("Bob") and Jar Jar Binks ("JJ"). JJ is depressed due to being perceived as annoying and plans to commit suicide, but Ani inspires him to change his ways and join Ani's pit crew for the Boonta Eve pod race. Also racing is Ani's old nemesis Sebulba, eager to humiliate Ani for beating him all those years ago. Tarkin arrives on Tatooine but has a change of heart, agreeing to help Ani train for the race ("With My Own Eyes").

=== Act II ===
Ani, Tarkin, and Jar Jar begin training for the Boonta Eve ("The Force (You Got It)"). Mara goes to Jabba's palace to audition for the dancing slave girl position but is ridiculed and denied an audition for having no previous experience.

Tarkin takes Emily to the Mos Eisley cantina for drinks. There they meet Obi-Wan Kenobi, who is shocked to hear that Ani is still alive after he defeated and left him for dead years prior. Tarkin is contacted by Palpatine and he and Emily leave the cantina to take the call. Palpatine has been informed by another general of Ani's goal to race, and demands Tarkin to bring him back to the Death Star. Tarkin dramatically refuses and hangs up. Tarkin and Emily later share a romantic moment after Tarkin charms Emily with romantic lines Ani gave to him ("Haunted By The Kiss"). Meanwhile, Obi-Wan forms an alliance with Sebulba to kill Ani and Jar Jar.

Obi-Wan appears at Jar Jar's residence; he draws a pistol on Jar Jar, robbing him and then shooting him before fleeing. Jar Jar later dies in a hospital with Ani being there for his final moments. Ani decides to give up on racing on the fear he may be targeted next but is convinced otherwise by Tarkin and Mara, who remind Ani of his dream.

On the day of the race, Sebulba sabotages Ani's pod by removing the power coupling. The race commences ("One In A Million"). Ani and Sebulba appear to be evenly matched until Ani's pod runs out of power and Sebulba knocks into him, causing him and his pod to crash into the side. Palpatine confronts Ani at the crash site and apologizes for not understanding Ani's passion in pod-racing. He reactivates Ani's pod with his force lightning, sending Ani back into the race. Ani catches up to Sebulba and punches him in the nose, winning the race shortly after.

Ani's friend Boba Fett is able to secure Mara an audition for a slave girl position through his connections to Jabba. Ani, Tarkin, and Emily are there to watch Mara's audition ("Back On Top"). She gets the part and the cast celebrates with a reprise of the musical's first song.

== Cast and characters ==
Actor/Actress	Character
Chris Allen	Anakin "Ani" Skywalker (Darth Vader)
Joe Walker	Moff Jeffrey Tarkin
Denise Donovan	Mara Jade
Brian Holden	Jar Jar "J.J." Binks / Admiral Motti
Julia Albain	Emily the Stormtrooper
Eric Kahn Gale	Sebulba / Qui-Gon Jinn / Jabba the Hutt
Joe Moses	Boba "Bob" Fett / General Veers
Meredith Stepien	Oola / Cantina Band Member
Nick Lang	Emperor "Pappy" Palpatine / Obi-Wan Kenobi / Bib Fortuna
Clark Baxtresser	Cantina Band Member
Pierce Siebers	Cantina Band Member

Every actor with the exceptions of Baxtresser and Siebers also played various characters as part of the ensemble.

== Musical numbers ==
Act I

- "Ani"
- "Long Ago And Far Away"
- "Strike Back"
- "With My Own Eyes"

Act II

- "The Force (You Got It)"
- "Haunted By The Kiss"
- "One In A Million"
- "Back On Top"

== Reception ==
Ani received mixed reviews.

TheForce.Net said of the "non-musical musical" concept, "The music and lyrics, despite being wonderfully penned by TalkFine, don't seem to be as effective off-stage as they probably would have been on-stage," also criticising the production design and describing the script as "not Nick & Matt Lang's best"; however, there was praise for the performances and the humour.

Observation Deck criticised the weak plot but praised the humor.

Hypable's Danielle Zimmermann praised Brian Holden's portrayal of Jar Jar Binks and Nick Lang's portrayal of Obi-Wan Kenobi, calling the show "cleverly written and a lot of fun."

This was Starkid's last parody musical for a number of years, with Starkid only returning to the format in 2020 with "A VHS Christmas Carol".
