= A. J. Holmes =

American actor, singer and composer

- Born: Andrew James Holmes; November 14, 1989 (age 36); California, U.S.
- Education: University of Michigan
- Occupations: Actor, singer, composer

Andrew James Holmes (born November 14, 1989, in California) is an American actor, singer and composer working in musical theater, and a member of StarKid Productions.

He is known primarily for playing the role of Elder Cunningham in The Book of Mormon on Broadway, the US tour, the West End, Melbourne and Sydney. Holmes is also a member of StarKid Productions, having composed music for four of the theatre company's shows and acted in four of them. He was the sole composer of Twisted, leading him to be most closely identified with that musical.

== Early life ==
Holmes grew up in Southern California and graduated from University of Michigan in 2011.

== Career ==
While still in college, Holmes was a founding member of StarKid Productions, co-composing the music for their first show in 2009, A Very Potter Musical, where he also was credited as the music director and played the piano in the pit orchestra. Holmes then reprised his role as co-composer, music director, and pianist for Me and My Dick later that year, as well as playing the acting role of Joey's Heart.

After graduating, Holmes was cast as Frederick Frankenstein in the US national tour of Young Frankenstein. Holmes played this role from September 30, 2011, to May 31, 2012.

In 2012, Holmes returned to StarKid for A Very Potter Senior Year. He served as co-composer, musical director, and keyboard 1 in the pit orchestra, as well as playing the role of Gilderoy Lockhart.

In 2013, Holmes was the standby for Elder Cunningham on The Book of Mormon in the Chicago, Illinois production. He also composed the music for StarKid's Twisted alongside Kaley McMahon, who wrote the lyrics.

In 2013–2014, Holmes played Cunningham on the first national tour of The Book of Mormon.

In 2014, Holmes transferred to the Broadway production of The Book of Mormon as a standby for Cunningham from January 14, 2014, to June 29, 2014. From July 28, 2014, to January 31, 2015, he played the role in the West End production of the show, replacing Jared Gertner.

In 2015–2016, Holmes embarked on the second national tour of The Book of Mormon, again reprising his role as Elder Cunningham. He played this role from February 13, 2015, to May 1, 2016.

In 2017–2018, Holmes continued playing Elder Cunningham in The Book of Mormon. He originated the role in Melbourne from its opening on January 17, 2017, until his departure on June 25, 2017. Holmes returned to the role when the production moved to the Sydney Lyric theater on February 28, 2018. Holmes departed the production on September 9, 2018.

In 2025, Holmes played Jeff in the ACT production of Nobody Loves You from February 25 to March 30, 2025.

In 2026 Holmes played Gary, the Game Master in Starkid's musical Tomb Quest.

== Credits ==
=== Actor ===
Year	Title	Role	Category
2009	Me and My Dick	Joey's Heart	University of Michigan
2011	Starship	Starship Captain (cameo)	Chicago
2011–2012	Young Frankenstein	Frederick Frankenstein	U.S. tour
2012	A Very Potter Senior Year	Gilderoy Lockhart	LeakyCon
2013	The Book of Mormon	Elder Cunningham (standby)	Chicago
2013–2014	The Book of Mormon	Elder Cunningham	First U.S. national tour
2014	The Book of Mormon	Elder Cunningham (standby)	Broadway
2014–2015	The Book of Mormon	Elder Cunningham	West End
2015–2016	The Book of Mormon	Elder Cunningham	Second U.S. national tour
2017–2018	The Book of Mormon	Elder Cunningham	Australia national tour
2016	Bubble Boy	Jimmy	
2020	Spies Are Forever	The Deadliest Man Alive / Richard Big / Ensemble	Feinstein's/54 Below concert; cancelled due to COVID-19 pandemic
2020	A VHS Christmas Carol	Fezziwig	Livestreamed performance
2021	VHS Christmas Carol Live!	Fezziwig	Los Angeles
2022	Young Frankenstein	Frederick Frankenstein	La Mirada Theatre, CA
2022	Spies Are Forever	Susan / Ensemble / Vanger Borschtit	Feinstein's/54 Below Concert; reschedule of cancelled 2020 show
2022-2024	Kimberly Akimbo	Buddy (standby)	Booth Theatre
2023; 2024	VHS Christmas Carols	Scrooge	Apollo Theatre, Chicago
2025	Nobody Loves You	Jeff	American Conservatory Theater, San Francisco
2026	Tomb Quest	Gary	Colony Theatre, Los Angeles

=== Music ===
Year	Title	Contribution
2009	A Very Potter Musical	Composer, music director, piano
2009	Me and My Dick	Composer, music director, piano
2012	A Very Potter Senior Year	Composer, music director, keyboard 1
2013	Twisted	Composer
