= A Very Potter Senior Year =

Harry Potter parody musical

- Music: Clark Baxtresser; Pierce Siebers; A. J. Holmes
- Lyrics: Clark Baxtresser; Pierce Siebers; A. J. Holmes
- Book: Matt Lang; Nick Lang; Brian Holden
- Basis: Harry Potter by J. K. Rowling
- Productions: 2012 LeakyCon

A Very Potter Senior Year (often shortened to AVPSY) is a musical written by Matt Lang, Nick Lang, and Brian Holden with songs by Clark Baxtresser, Pierce Siebers, A. J. Holmes, and additional songs by Darren Criss. It is the conclusion of the Very Potter trilogy of Harry Potter-inspired musicals produced over four years by StarKid Productions. Rather than a full musical, as with its previous installments, the production took the form of a live staged reading of the script with performances of the songs at LeakyCon in Chicago, Illinois, on August 11, 2012. It featured nearly all of the StarKid actors and actresses who had starred in previous StarKid shows to date, including actor Darren Criss, who returned to the company to reprise his role as Harry Potter, and Evanna Lynch as Luna Lovegood, who played the character in the original film series.

The script and soundtrack became available in December 2012, and official footage of the musical was released on the StarKid YouTube channel on March 15, 2013. In March 2013, it had reached over 400,000 views, making the StarKid Productions page the most viewed of the month and has gone on to reach over 600,000 views. On the YouTube recording, Darren Criss' microphone did not record and, consequently, all of his audio had to be pulled from different mics. The story is a parody, based on several of the Harry Potter novels (particularly Harry Potter and the Chamber of Secrets and Harry Potter and the Half-Blood Prince) by J. K. Rowling, as well as their film counterparts.

== Synopsis ==
=== Act I ===
Luna Lovegood and Neville Longbottom wander the Department of Mysteries, chased by Death Eaters. The Death Eaters retrieve Tom Riddle's diary from a safe in the Ministry, but this is taken from them by Ron, who rescues Luna and Neville. The three join Hermione outside the Room of Death, but are again surrounded by foes ("This Is The End"). Harry appears and rescues the group. Mad-Eye Moody enters the scene, who Harry reveals to be Barty Crouch Jr. Crouch is apprehended by the Wizard Cops. Crouch leaves Harry with the ominous message that with the Death Eater's gone, his fame will fade.

Harry presents his girlfriend, Ginny, with Riddle's diary. Ron reveals his insecurities in his and Hermione's relationship because she hasn't kissed him in several years. Harry realizes he doesn't know what to do after leaving Hogwarts. Ron is given the keys to the family car, and he flies Harry, Hermione, and Ginny to Hogwarts to start the school year ("Senior Year"). They crash the car, killing Professor Sprout and the school's mandrakes, but Draco saves them from expulsion by headmaster McGonagall. Despite this, Harry refuses to acknowledge him as a friend.

In the Great Hall, Harry and Draco are announced as the two candidates for the coming Head Boy election. Gilderoy Lockhart is announced to be the new Defence Against the Dark Arts teacher and is quickly proven to be more popular than Harry ("Wizard Of The Year"). Believing it as a cause for his loss in popularity, Harry ends his relationship with Ginny, who turns to the diary for comfort. The diary shows her a flashback of Dumbledore first meeting Tom Riddle at an orphanage and Riddle's first day at Hogwarts; Ginny quickly falls under Riddle's spell ("Always Dance").

Hermione reveals her passion for fanfiction to Lockhart and he commissions her to write essays for each of Harry's school years. Draco and Harry begin their preparations for the coming Head Boy election, when Harry suddenly overhears the Basilisk. The group discovers Colin Creevey and an entranced Ginny in front of a message written in blood. The message declares that the Chamber of Secrets has been opened, and Harry sees the situation as an opportunity to regain his popularity among the students.

Ginny again writes in the diary and Riddle shows the aftermath of his murder of Moaning Myrtle. Riddle, now a moody teenager and leader of a Dark Arts school group, is encouraged by Dumbledore to visit his family ("When You Have To Go All The Way Home").

Back in the present, Harry takes Cho as his date to Nearly Headless Nick's Deathday Party, but he becomes jealous upon seeing Ginny with Seamus and Dean. Ron points out he took Ginny for granted. Lavender kisses Ron on the cheek, which he believes is a betrayal to Hermione. Harry, sabotaged by Draco, accidentally destroys the cake and ice sculpture causing everyone to angrily leave.

After the party, Harry overhears the Basilisk a second time and discovers Nearly Headless Nick petrified, they question Ginny who claims to know nothing before running away. The Golden Trio follow a trail of spiders to the Forbidden Forest, where they encounter Aragog ("Get In My Mouth"). Aragog tries to eat the three friends, but Hagrid appears to rescue them. Hagrid tries to cheer up Harry by reminding him of his heroism, but Harry is still worried about leaving school.

Ginny writes in the diary again and Riddle shows her of his time at his father's house. At first he enjoyed his time with his grandparents, and did not maim or kill anything for several weeks. However, his father turned out to hate him. Upon discovering they are muggles and they give him Snickers as a present, Riddle murders all of them.

Harry and Draco tie in the elections for Head Boy after everyone votes for Fozzie Bear instead. Lockhart proposes a wizard duel to settle the tie, and Draco intends to forfeit because he regards Harry as a friend. Harry insults Draco and goads him into fighting ("Tonight This School Is Mine"). Draco uses his Serpensortia spell to conjure a snake, and Harry consequently reveals his Parseltongue ability before the entire school. This event makes the principal suspect Harry as Slytherin's heir, which leads Draco to be announced as the winner of the duel and as new Head Boy.

Harry laments his downfall while Ginny reads of Riddle's remorse ("When I Was..."). Harry decides to leave Hogwarts, and Riddle finally reveals himself to be Lord Voldemort before Ginny. Voldemort summons the Basilisk, promising it finer prey than vermin.

=== Act II ===
After Hannah Abbott is petrified, Professor McGonagall announces that the school will be closed unless the Chamber of Secrets is found and the Basilisk slain. The students blame Harry for this and Ron stands up for him convincing the others to find Harry, but Draco reveals Ron's 'cheating' on Hermione, upsetting her. In an attempt to make him jealous, she tries to flirt with Lockhart who instead tricks her into signing over the copyright for her Harry Potter essays.

Hermione runs into a possessed Ginny and watches Voldemort have Ginny her search for the Resurrection Stone, eventually grabbing the diary and seeing Voldemort, but is petrified by the Basilisk. In the infirmary, Ron cries over Hermione's petrified body and determines to find a way to save everyone, realising he doesn't care about being second-best ("I'm Just A Sidekick"). Ron discovers a note Hermione wrote; Draco and Ron drink Felix Felicis and Draco sets out to find the Chamber of Secrets, while Ron searches for Harry.

Ron runs into Lockhart, who gloats about how he has turned Harry's story into seven books and merchandise in order to extort money from muggles. He also revealed he purposefully drove Harry away and slandered him in the election, he attempts to obliviate Ron, but is chased by the Wizard Cops who had been working with Hagrid all year. Ron learns that Kingsley Shacklebolt intends to blow up Hogwarts to kill the monster, but Hagrid secretly frees Ron who steals the flying car.

Harry is horrified to find Godric's Hollow has destroyed his statue to replace with one of Andrew Garfield's Spiderman, but the construction worker gives him advice. The worker repeats what Dumbledore said earlier, revealing to have Dumbledore's beard underneath his own before vanishing mysteriously. Ron arrives and attempts to convince him to return, but Harry refuses and causes a distraught Ron to storm off.

Harry finds the Resurrection Stone inside his lucky Snitch, and the ghosts of his deceased family and friends appear to give him encouragement ("Everything Ends"). Ron returns after talking to the construction worker and they return to Hogwarts. The students stand up to the Ministry and with Ron, Harry, the Sorting Hat 'Sorty', and the Scarf of Sexual Preference 'Scarfy', set out to slay the Basilisk ("Goin' Back To Hogwarts" reprise).

Inside the Chamber, Harry and the students are overpowered by the Basilisk. Scarfy sacrifices himself to temporarily blind the Basilisk and allow them to escape. Harry succeeds in pulling the sword of Gryffindor from the Sorting Hat and slays the Basilisk, but is bitten in the process ("Harry Freakin' Potter" reprise). As Voldemort stands over a dying Harry, Harry stabs the diary with the sword, killing the fragment of Voldemort's soul and saving Ginny. Hagrid arrives with Fawkes, whose healing tears rescue Harry from near-death.

The petrified students recover from their frozen state following the Basilisk's death, except for Colin Creevey, who dies. Hermione joins the rest of the students in the Chamber. Ron pulls an engagement ring from the Scarf of Sexual Preference and proposes to Hermione, who accepts, having heard his song in the infirmary. Harry finally accepts Draco as his friend. Harry proposes to Ginny, who accepts, and the students rejoice ("Days of Summer" reprise). As Harry is taking in all the times he had at Hogwarts, Ron arrives to pick him up for the last time. Harry says goodbye to Hogwarts and leaves with Ron.

19 years later, Harry takes his son - Albus Scarfy Potter - to platform 9¾ ("Goin' Back to Hogwarts" reprise), where he runs into Quirrell, but fails to recognize him. Voldemort and Quirrell are at King's Cross to see their daughter leave for Hogwarts. Voldemort has come to terms with his defeat, and says that Harry has taught him how to love and that it is okay to let go of things, even if it hurts.

== Notable casts ==
Character	LeakyCon 2012
Harry Potter	Darren Criss
Ron Weasley	Joey Richter
Tom Riddle / Lord Voldemort	Joe Walker
Hermione Granger	Meredith Stepien
Ginny Weasley	Jaime Lyn Beatty
Draco Malfoy	Lauren Lopez
Gilderoy Lockhart	A. J. Holmes
Albus Dumbledore	Dylan Saunders
The Narrator	Bob Joles
Luna Lovegood	Evanna Lynch
Rubeus Hagrid / Remus Lupin / Basilisk	Brian Holden
Quirinus Quirrell / Seamus Finnigan / James Potter	Brian Rosenthal
Fenrir Greyback / Sirius Black	Nick Strauss
Severus Snape / Nearly Headless Nick	Joe Moses
Bellatrix Lestrange / Dean Thomas	Britney Coleman
Aragog	Jeff Blim
Cedric Diggory / Lucius Malfoy / Minerva McGonagall	Tyler Brunsman
Cho Chang / Charlie Weasley	Devin Lytle
Neville Longbottom	Richard Campbell
Sorty / Scarfy / Arthur Weasley	Nick Lang
Lavender Brown / George Weasley	Sango Tajima
Gregory Goyle / Bill Weasley	Jim Povolo
Pansy Parkinson / Molly Weasley	Lily Marks
Lily Potter / Hannah Abbott / Mary Riddle / Fred Weasley	Arielle Goldman
Kingsley Shacklebolt	Corey Dorris
Mrs. Cole	Denise Donovan
Madame Pomfrey / Grey Lady	Elona Finlay
Moaning Myrtle / Barty Crouch Jr. / Mad-Eye Moody / Tom Riddle Sr.	Chris Allen
Colin Creevey / Percy Weasley	Brant Cox
Thoms Riddle / Snake	Nico Ager
Fleur Delacour / Albus Scarfy Potter	Alle-Faye Monka
Wizard Cop	Eric Kahn Gale
Candy Lady	Pat Brady

== Musical numbers ==
Act I

- "This Is The End" – Ron, Neville, Luna, Hermione and Ensemble
- "Senior Year" – Ron, Hermione, Ginny, Harry
- "Wizard Of The Year" – Lockhart and Ensemble
- "Always Dance" – Dumbledore, Tom and Slytherins
- "When You Have to Go All the Way Home" - Bellatrix, Lucius, Clark Baxtresser and Pierce Siebers
- "Get In My Mouth" – Aragog and Ensemble
- "Tonight This School Is Mine" – Draco and Harry
- "When I Was..." – Harry and Tom

Act II

- "I'm Just A Sidekick" – Ron
- "Everything Ends" – James, Sirius, Lupin, Lily, Snape and Cedric
- "Goin' Back to Hogwarts" - Harry, Ron, McGonagall and Company*
- "Harry Freakin' Potter" - Harry and Company*
- "Days of Summer" - Company*
- "Goin' Back to Hogwarts (Finale)" - Harry*

Songs denoted with a * are not on the A Very Potter Senior Year soundtrack.

== Recording ==
A cast recording of the production was released in December 2012 through Bandcamp and the StarKid Productions website. Only the tracks which were not featured in the earlier musicals are present on the recording.

Britney Coleman replaced Evanna Lynch as Luna Lovegood on the soundtrack, and Darren Criss was replaced by Clark Baxtresser as Harry Potter.

== See also ==
- Lists of musicals
