= Firebringer =

2016 musical and YouTube video

- DVD cover
- Music: Meredith Stepien; Mark Swiderski
- Lyrics: Meredith Stepien; Mark Swiderski
- Book: Matt Lang; Nick Lang; Brian Holden
- Productions: 2016 Chicago

Firebringer is a comedy musical with music and lyrics by Meredith Stepien and Mark Swiderski and a book by Matt Lang, Nick Lang, and Brian Holden with additional writing by Stepien. It was the tenth staged show produced by StarKid Productions. The story follows characters in the prehistoric era where the invention of fire is studied. The show ran from July 6 to August 7, 2016 at Stage 773 in Chicago, Illinois. A recording of the production was uploaded to YouTube on December 31, 2016. A cast recording was released on iTunes on November 22, 2016.

The show was funded through Kickstarter, similarly to the company's previous productions. The project raised US$154,670 from its 3,722 backers.

== Synopsis ==
=== Act I ===
The show begins with the ensemble dancing around a figure playing ancient drums ("Fire"). Molag, the narrator, speaks to the audience about fire and brings them back in time to tell the story of its invention ("We Are People Now"). In this time, a prolonged intellectual disagreement known as The Great Debate between Smelly-Balls and Chorn is causing chaos in a small tribe of early Homo sapiens. Their leader, Jemilla, steps in and solves it by encouraging Smelly-Balls to change his perspective, earning her the title 'Peacemaker'. The tribe then receives a blessing from their deity, a duck known as the Almighty Duck, and Jemilla encourages them to resume their work. However, a tribe member named Zazzalil pleads for a day off to sing and practice dancing, which has just been invented. Though Zazzalil resists, Jemilla and the rest of the tribe assert that the work must be done ("We Got Work to Do"). While the rest of the tribe performs their jobs, Jemilla meets with Molag, the tribe's former leader. Molag reveals that the duck the tribe worships is but one of many ducks that Molag has captured and used to control the tribe during her time as leader. She also reveals Tiblyn's duty of holding up the sky is unnecessary and useless. Jemilla is severely shaken by these revelations.

Zazzalil and her crony Keeri find Jemilla in her moment of desperation and present an idea to start eating squirrels, instead of their current food staples of nuts and berries. Jemilla tells them to stop thinking of such things and focus on their job, collecting nuts. Zazzalil resents Jemilla's rules and thinks she's holding her back ("What If?"). Zazzalil then has an idea for another invention when she realizes that a sharp stone Keeri found can pierce the skin and potentially kill animals ("Welcome to the Stone Age"). After watching a performance of the single joke in the repertoire of the inventor of comedy, Jemilla's wife Schwoopsie, Tiblyn, and Emberly come upon an intruder named Grunt. Though scared at first, Emberly stops Grunt from eating a poisonous berry and gives him a sandwich she invented ("Just a Taste"). They almost kiss, but Jemilla and the rest of the tribe chase Grunt away since he is an outsider. Jemilla then decides to reveal what Molag taught her, that the duck is not a god and Tiblyn's holding her arms towards the sky is not preventing it from falling. The supreme wizard Ducker claims Jemilla is just a heretic, but is proven wrong when Tiblyn drops her arms, and nothing happens. Ducker removes his wizard hat and the duck flies away. Everyone is dismayed by the shattering of their false ideas, especially Tiblyn and Ducker.

Zazzalil then arrives with her new invention, a spear. She attempts to test it on Keeri, but Jemilla stops her. She then attempts to test it on a mammoth named Trunkell (Lauren Walker/Joey Richter) that killed her parents but misses and angers Trunkell. The mammoth chases the tribe up a tree and intimidates them to stay there until nightfall, when Trunkell leaves and the tribe must return to their cave to avoid Snarl, a bloodthirsty Smilodon ("The Night Belongs to Snarl"). While the rest of the tribe continues to struggle with a seemingly godless world, Zazzalil leaves the cave to kill Trunkell and prove that the spear does work ("Into the Night"). The tribe chases after her and find her entering a cave containing a sleeping creature who turns out to be not Trunkell, but Snarl. A bolt of lightning hits the end of Zazzalil's spear and creates a torch which she uses to scare off Snarl. The tribe is amazed by the new invention, which Chorn calls fire, and Zazzalil uses their new respect for her to convince them to banish Jemilla. Jemilla warns them that the fire is dangerous and leaves. The tribe worships Zazzalil as the Firebringer ("The Night Belongs to Us").

=== Act II ===
The tribe, now led by Zazzalil, marvel over how fire has improved their lives – they have moved out of the cave and kill mammoths so that they no longer go hungry ("Climate Change"). The fire, however, is revealed to have a negative effect as well – it distracts the tribe members from interacting with each other. In addition, Keeri tells Zazzalil that she thinks the mammoths have gone extinct from overhunting, and that the extra meat they dump in the watering hole has poisoned all of the water. Zazzalil encourages her not to worry but Keeri thinks she is turning into a monster. Jemilla, in exile, admits to herself that perhaps her reluctance to accept new ideas was wrong ("Jemilla's Lament"), when suddenly a man (Clark Baxtresser) from another tribe appears and leads her to his tribe's village.

Grunt manages to find Emberly in her new village and shows her his paintings, then paints a portrait of her ("Paint Me"). Meanwhile, Ducker attempts to reestablish his former power as the duck priest by saying he can interpret the wishes of fire, which is now revered. He asks the tribe to light his hat on fire, which he claims will not burn him and prove that he is the fire's vessel on earth. He catches on fire and quickly sets the whole village ablaze ("Ouch My Butt"), after which the fire dies out. Everyone blames Zazzalil; Keeri says that Jemilla was right to call the fire dangerous, and that Zazzalil is a bad leader. Suddenly, Snarl appears, and snatches Grunt back to his lair. Emberly entreats the tribe to help her get Grunt back, and they all agree to help her. Emberly comes up with a plan to defeat Snarl – she paints fire on a stone tablet using her feces and hopes that the image of fire will drive him off. Though Zazzalil begs them not to go, saying it's a bad plan, the tribe follows Emberly to save Grunt.

Zazzalil laments her mistakes ("Backfire") and is visited by the man from the other tribe who, upon hearing her name, brings her back to his tribe. There she finds that Jemilla is the new leader of this tribe. Zazzalil begs her to return, admitting that she is a better leader, but Jemilla refuses as in this new tribe she has many attractive husbands and wives ('played by' the audience) and two children. Zazzalil promises to marry Jemilla if she returns, but Jemilla still refuses. Eventually they both confess their wrongdoings to each other and admit they're more alike than they thought. Jemilla finally agrees to return, saying goodbye to her husbands, wives, and children. Jemilla tells Zazzalil that she will hold her to the marriage promise, and they celebrate how much more they can accomplish ("Together"). Jemilla resolves to help save Grunt and the tribe and tells Zazzalil they need to make more spears.

The rest of the tribe finds Grunt in Snarl's lair, but Grunt's feet and one of his arms have already been eaten. Snarl is asleep, leading the tribe to believe that they can rescue Grunt and leave without having to deal with the predator. However, Jemilla and Zazzalil enter the cave loudly and cause Snarl to reawaken. When Emberly's plan to wave the painting at him doesn't work, Jemilla and Zazzalil attempt to stab Snarl through the eyes with their spears. They both miss and hit their spears against the cave wall, creating sparks. Zazzalil realizes this is how fire is made and bangs the sharpened stones from their spears together, creating a fire that sets Snarl ablaze, killing him. Jemilla congratulates Zazzalil for making fire and the tribe is in awe. Suddenly, Chorn reveals itself to be an alien of a species that seeded life on Earth. It was charged with testing humanity and declares the lightning bolt that hit Zazzalil's spear to make the first fire was actually a photon beam from its ship. It admonishes the tribe not to let new inventions make them arrogant, and restores Grunt's arm, though it is incapable of doing the same to his feet. It then gives the whole tribe its vast alien knowledge including the future of all humanity ("Chorn"), sending them into spasms. When the tribe awakens, they sing and dance; Zazzalil and Jemilla propose to each other, and Jemilla promises to give new ideas a try before dismissing them. The tribe finds comfort in their larger understanding of the world ("Finale").

== Musical numbers ==
Act I

- "Fire" – Ensemble
- "We Are People Now" – Ensemble
- "We Got Work to Do" – Zazzalil, Jemilla, and Ensemble
- "What If?" – Zazzalil
- "Welcome to the Stone Age" – Ensemble
- "Just a Taste" – Emberly and Grunt
- "Duck Is Lord" – Ducker and Ensemble*
- "The Night Belongs to Snarl" – Smelly-Balls, Schwoopsie, Ducker, Tiblyn, and Ensemble
- "Into the Night" – Zazzalil and Ensemble
- "The Night Belongs to Us" – Zazzalil, Jemilla, and Ensemble

Act II

- "Climate Change" – Zazzalil and Ensemble
- "Jemilla's Lament" – Jemilla
- "Paint Me" – Grunt and Emberly
- "Ouch My Butt" – Ensemble
- "Backfire" – Zazzalil and Ensemble
- "Together" – Zazzalil and Jemilla
- "Chorn" – Chorn and Ensemble
- "Finale (Make the Most of It)" – Ensemble

*Not included in the cast album

== Cast and characters ==
| Character | Chicago (2016) |
|---|---|
| Zazzalil | Lauren Lopez |
| Jemilla | Meredith Stepien |
| Keeri | Denise Donovan |
| Molag | Lauren Walker |
| Emberly | Rachael Soglin |
| Grunt | Joey Richter |
| Schwoopsie | Jaime Lyn Beatty |
| Ducker | Joseph Walker |
| Tiblyn | Tiffany Williams |
| Smelly-Balls | Brian Holden |
| Chorn | Jamie Burns |
| Clark Baxtresser | Clark Baxtresser |

== Critical response ==
The musical received generally positive reviews. Online source Hypable hosts a guest-written review that is generally positive. Reviewer Julia Delbel praises the female-led cast in particular: "Firebringer provides a refreshing change[...] by skipping right to the part where no one has to question women’s rights because they just exist." Nina Metz of the Chicago Tribune is also positive in this aspect: "The women are in charge here, but you will find nothing so obvious as a girl power anthem in the score. The show simply takes it as a given. That's pretty great." Christopher Kidder-Mostrom of Theatre by Numbers gives a positive review, praising the show as a "tightly scripted piece" with "solid melodies, harmonies, and even clever rhyme schemes."

A clip of the beginning of the song "We've Got Work To Do," specifically Zazzalil's refrain "I don't really wanna do the work today" went viral a few months after the musical was released, and was even parodied by the cast of The Book of Mormon.

== See also ==
- Lists of musicals
