= Lea Michele discography =

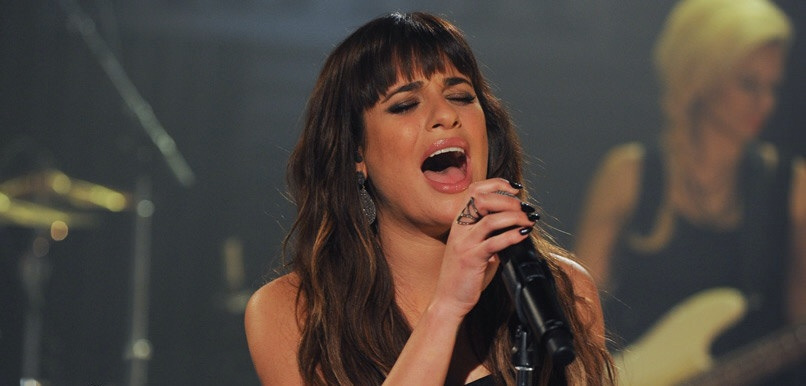
- Michele performing in March 2014
- Studio albums: 4
- Singles: 5
- Music videos: 3
- Promotional singles: 7

American singer Lea Michele has released four studio albums, five singles, seven promotional singles, and three music videos. Michele came to prominence for her role as Rachel Berry on the television series Glee, where she established her musical career performing on the series' soundtrack albums. Prior to this, she was known for her Broadway soundtrack credits.

In 2012, Michele signed a record deal with Columbia. She began recording for her debut album on October 19, 2012. On November 27, 2013, Michele announced that the first single from her debut album, Louder, would be "Cannonball", which debuted at number 75 on the Billboard Hot 100, selling over 51,000 copies in its first week of sale. The accompanying music video was released on January 9, 2014. Four songs were also released as promotional singles in the lead-up to the album: "Battlefield", "Louder", "What Is Love?", and "You're Mine". The album, which was released on March 4, 2014, made its debut on the Billboard 200 at number 4, selling over 62,000 copies in its first week. Michele's second single, "On My Way", was released on May 4, 2014, with its music video premiering on May 19, 2014.

On March 3, 2017, Michele released "Love Is Alive" as the first single from her second studio album, Places. Three songs were also released as promotional singles in the lead-up to the album: "Anything's Possible", "Run to You", and "Getaway Car". The album, which was released on April 28, 2017, debuted at number 28 on the Billboard 200, selling over 16,000 copies in its first week.

On October 25, 2019, Michele released her third studio album, Christmas in the City. The album is her first Christmas album.

Michele released her fourth studio album, Forever, on November 5, 2021.

== Albums ==
=== Studio albums ===
List of studio albums, with selected details, chart positions, sales, and certifications
Title	Album details	Peak chart positions											Sales
Title	Album details	US	AUS	AUT	CAN	IRE	ITA	JPN	FRA	NZ	SWI	UK	Sales
Louder	Release date: March 3, 2014; Label: Columbia; Format: CD, digital download	4	4	25	4	11	8	29	15	6	18	16	US: 110,000
Places	Release date: April 28, 2017; Label: Columbia; Format: CD, digital download	28	25	—	21	82	34	124	148	— (Note: Places did not enter the NZ Top 40 Albums Chart, but peaked at number two on the NZ Heatseekers Albums Chart.)	38	37	US: 16,000
Christmas in the City	Released: October 25, 2019; Label: Sony; Format: CD, LP, digital download, streaming	— (Note: Christmas in the City did not enter the US Billboard 200 but peaked at number nine on the Digital Albums chart and number 24 on the Top Album Sales chart.)	— (Note: Christmas in the City did not enter the ARIA Albums Chart, but peaked at number 25 on the ARIA Digital Album Chart.)	—	—	—	—	—	—	—	—	—	
Forever	Released: November 5, 2021; Label: Self-released; Format: digital download, streaming	—	—	—	—	—	—	—	—	—	—	—	
"—" denotes a recording that did not chart or was not released in that territory.

=== Soundtrack albums ===
Title	Album details
Spring Awakening	Release date: November 21, 2006 (US); Label: Universal Music, Polydor, Decca; Format: Digital download, CD
Legends of Oz: Dorothy's Return	Release date: May 6, 2014 (US); Label: Columbia; Format: Digital download
Funny Girl	Release date: 18 November 2022; Label: Sony Music; Format: Digital download

== Singles ==
=== As lead artist ===
List of singles as lead artist with selected chart positions, showing year released and album name
Title	Year	Peak chart positions										Album
Title	Year	US	AUS	BEL	CAN	FRA	IRE	ITA	JPN	SPA	UK	Album
"Cannonball"	2013	75	45	— (Note: "Cannonball" did not enter the Ultratop 50, but peaked at number 7 on the Flemish Ultratip chart.)	49	48	80	27	82	32	56	Louder
"On My Way"	2014	—	—	— (Note: "On My Way" did not enter the Ultratop 50, but peaked at number 40 on the Flemish Ultratip chart.)	81	45	—	68	—	45	—	Louder
"Love Is Alive"	2017	—	—	—	—	150	—	—	—	—	—	Places
"It's the Most Wonderful Time of the Year"	2019	—	—	—	—	—	—	—	—	—	—	Christmas in the City
"Christmas in New York"	2019	— (Note: "Christmas in New York" did not enter the Billboard Hot 100, but peaked at number 15 on the Holiday Digital Song Sales chart.)	—	—	—	—	—	—	—	—	—	Christmas in the City
"—" denotes a recording that did not chart or was not released in that territory.

=== As featured artist ===
List of singles as featured artist with selected chart positions, showing year released and album name
Title	Year	Peak chart positions	Album
Title	Year	US Dance	Album
"This Is for My Girls" (among artists for "Let Girls Learn")	2016	5	Non-album single

=== Promotional singles ===
List of promotional singles as lead artist with selected chart positions, showing year released and album name
Title	Year	Peak chart positions							Album
Title	Year	US	CAN	DEN	FRA	IRE	ITA	SPA	Album
"Battlefield"	2013	—	—	—	117	66	70	—	Louder
"Louder"	2014	— (Note: "Louder" did not enter the Billboard Hot 100, but peaked at number 11 on the Bubbling Under Hot 100 Singles chart.)	64	40	46	—	44	47	Louder
"What Is Love?"	2014	—	99	—	55	—	59	45	Louder
"You're Mine"	2014	— (Note: "You're Mine" did not enter the Billboard Hot 100, but peaked at number 12 on the Bubbling Under Hot 100 Singles chart.)	83	—	47	—	50	—	Louder
"Anything's Possible"	2017	—	—	—	—	—	—	—	Places
"Run to You"	2017	—	—	—	—	—	—	—	Places
"Getaway Car"	2017	—	—	—	—	—	—	—	Places
"—" denotes a recording that did not chart or was not released in that territory.

== Other charted songs ==
List of other charted songs with selected chart positions, showing year released and album name
Title	Year	Peak chart positions	Album
Title	Year	US Holiday Digital	Album
"Have Yourself a Merry Little Christmas"	2019	47	Christmas in the City
"I'll Be Home for Christmas" (featuring Jonathan Groff)	2019	30	Christmas in the City
"Do You Want to Build a Snowman?"	2019	33	Christmas in the City
"White Christmas" (featuring Darren Criss)	2019	31	Christmas in the City
"Angels We Have Heard on High" (featuring Cynthia Erivo)	2019	22	Christmas in the City
"O Holy Night"	2019	19	Christmas in the City

== Guest appearances ==
List of non-single guest appearances, with other performing artists, showing year released and album name
Title	Year	Other artist(s)	Album
"Henry Ford"	1996	Peter Friedman	Songs from Ragtime
"Gliding"	1996	Peter Friedman, Marin Mazzie, Gordon Stanley, Alex Strange	Songs from Ragtime
"Buffalo Nickel Photoplay, Inc."	1996	Peter Friedman, Judy Kaye, Steven Sutcliffe	Songs from Ragtime
"Matchmaker, Matchmaker"	2004	Alfred Molina, Laura Michelle Kelly, Sally Murphy, Nancy Opel, Tricia Paoluccio	Fiddler on the Roof
"The Leave-Taking"	2004	Alfred Molina, John Cariani, Molly Ephraim, Randy Graff, Sally Murphy	Fiddler on the Roof
"Can't Turn You Loose"	2011	Jon Bon Jovi	New Year's Eve
"Auld Lang Syne"	2011	—N/a	New Year's Eve
"Love Me For an Hour"	2021	Burt Bacharach, Steven Sater, Jonathan Groff	Some Lovers (World Premiere Recording)

== Music videos ==
Song	Year	Director	Release date	Ref.
"Cannonball"	2013	Robert Hales	January 9, 2014	
"On My Way"	2014	Hannah Lux Davis	May 19, 2014	
"Christmas in New York"	2019		November 19, 2019	
