= LM/DC Tour =

2018 concert tour by Lea Michele and Darren Criss

- Tour by Lea Michele and Darren Criss
- Location: North America • Europe
- Associated albums: Places; Homework
- Start date: May 30, 2018
- End date: December 7, 2018
- Legs: 3
- No. of shows: 22 in North America; 6 in Europe; 28 in total
Lea Michele tour chronology
An Intimate Evening with Lea Michele (2017)	LM/DC Tour (2018)	Christmas in NYC: Live in Concert (2019)
Darren Criss tour chronology
Listen Up Tour (2013)	LM/DC Tour (2018)

The LM/DC Tour is a co-headlining concert tour by American singers Lea Michele and Darren Criss. It is Michele's second headlining tour, promoting her second studio album Places (2017), and Criss' second concert tour, promoting his third extended play Homework (2016). The co-headlining tour began on May 30, 2018, in Nashville and concluded on December 7, 2018 in Birmingham.

== Background ==
On April 9, 2018, Michele and Criss announced on The Ellen DeGeneres Show that they would go on tour together.

In September 2018, further dates were announced including Las Vegas, Salt Lake City, Phoenix and multiple cities in California. The tour was later expanded to Dublin and the United Kingdom.

== Set list ==
This set list is representative of the show in Pittsburgh on June 2, 2018. It is not representative of all concert set lists for the duration of the tour.

Michele and Criss

1. "Broadway Baby"
2. "Suddenly Seymour"
3. "Falling Slowly"

Michele

4. "Cannonball"
5. "Battlefield"
6. "Don't Rain on My Parade"
7. "Maybe This Time"
8. "Poker Face" / "The Edge of Glory"
9. "Glitter in the Air"
10. "Run to You"

Michele and Criss

11. "Getaway Car"
12. "Cough Syrup" / "Hopelessly Devoted to You"

Criss

13. "Going Nowhere"
14. "I Don't Mind"
15. "I Dreamed a Dream"
16. "Genie in a Bottle"
17. "Foolish Thing"
18. "Not Alone"
19. "Teenage Dream"

Michele and Criss

20. "The Coolest Girl"
21. "This Time"
22. "Don't You Want Me" / "Make You Feel My Love"

=== Notes ===
- On the October 26, 2018, Las Vegas show, "Shallow" was added to the setlist for the remainder of the tour.

== Tour dates ==
Date	City	Country	Venue
North America
May 30, 2018	Nashville	United States	Ryman Auditorium
May 31, 2018	Cincinnati	United States	Taft Theatre
June 2, 2018	Pittsburgh	United States	Benedum Center
June 3, 2018	Washington, D.C.	United States	Kennedy Center Concert Hall
June 5, 2018	Indianapolis	United States	Murat Theatre
June 6, 2018	Columbus	United States	Ohio Theatre
June 8, 2018	Easton	United States	State Theatre
June 9, 2018	Newark	United States	Prudential Hall
June 10, 2018	Toronto	Canada	Sony Centre for the Performing Arts
June 26, 2018	Chicago	United States	Chicago Theatre
June 27, 2018	St. Louis	United States	Peabody Opera House
June 29, 2018	Atlanta	United States	John A. Williams Theatre
June 30, 2018	Durham	United States	Durham Performing Arts Center
July 1, 2018	Charlotte	United States	Ovens Auditorium
October 26, 2018	Las Vegas	United States	The Chelsea
October 27, 2018	Salt Lake City	United States	Delta Performance Hall
October 29, 2018	San Francisco	United States	SF Masonic Auditorium
October 30, 2018	San Jose	United States	San Jose Center for the Performing Arts
November 1, 2018	San Diego	United States	Humphreys Concerts By the Bay
November 2, 2018	Costa Mesa	United States	Segerstrom Hall
November 3, 2018	Tempe	United States	Gammage Memorial Auditorium
November 5, 2018	Los Angeles	United States	The Theatre at Ace Hotel
Europe
November 29, 2018	Dublin	Ireland	Vicar Street
December 1, 2018	Brighton	England	Brighton Centre
December 2, 2018	London	England	Eventim Apollo
December 4, 2018	Glasgow	Scotland	SEC Armadillo
December 5, 2018	Manchester	England	O_{2} Apollo
December 7, 2018	Birmingham	England	B1 (near Utilita Arena)

=== Box office score data ===
Venue	City	Tickets sold / Available	Gross revenue
Ryman Auditorium	Nashville	2,263 / 2,263 (100%)	$139,617
Ohio Theatre	Columbus	2,312 / 2,705 (85%)	$132,382
John A. Williams Theatre	Atlanta	1,774 / 2,236 (79%)	$121,591
San Jose Center for the Performing Arts	San Jose	1,392 / 2,610 (53%)	$101,928
The Theatre at Ace Hotel	Los Angeles	1,486 / 1,647 (90%)	$115,909
