= Homework (disambiguation) =

Homework is schoolwork assigned to be completed outside of class.

Homework may also refer to:

== Film ==
- Homework (1982 film), an American comedy starring Joan Collins
- Homework (1989 film), an Iranian documentary by Abbas Kiarostami
- Homework (1991 film), a Mexican drama by Jaime Humberto Hermosillo
- Homework (2011 film) or The Art of Getting By, an American romantic comedy-drama

== Music ==
=== Albums ===
- Homework (Daft Punk album), 1997
- Homework (Sunny Murray, Bob Dickie, and Robert Andreano album), 1997
- Homework (EP), by Darren Criss, 2017
- Homework, a 2008 album by Atomic Rooster
- Homework, an EP by Sam Fischer, 2020
- Homework, an EP by Straw, 2000

=== Songs ===
- "Homework", a song written by Irving Berlin, c. 1947–1951
- "Homework", a song written by Al Perkins and Dave Clark, and first recorded by Otis Rush in 1962
- "Homework", a song by the Bicycles from The Good, the Bad and the Cuddly, 2006
- "Homework", a song by Kim Petras, 2019

== Other uses ==
- "Homework" (short story), a 2007 story by Helen Simpson
- Home Work Convention, an International Labor Organization treaty
