= A Very Potter Musical (album) =

Cast recording by StarKid Productions
- Released: September 9, 2009
- Recorded: 2009
- Genre: Showtunes
- Length: 41:22
- Label: StarKid Productions

StarKid Productions chronology
Little White Lie (2009)	A Very Potter Musical (2009)	Me and My Dick (A New Musical) (2010)

The A Very Potter Musical album contains the songs from the Harry Potter parody musical A Very Potter Musical, produced by StarKid Productions with music and lyrics by Darren Criss (who also starred in the musical as Harry Potter) and A.J. Holmes (who played piano in the band), and book by Matt Lang, Nick Lang, and Brian Holden. It was recorded by the musical's cast and was released digitally through the group's official site in 2009 and later on their Bandcamp site on July 29, 2010.

== Track listing ==
No.	Title	Writer(s)	Performer(s)	Length
1.	"Gotta Get Back to Hogwarts"	Darren Criss	Darren Criss, Joey Richter, Bonnie Gruesen, Jaime Lyn Beatty, Devin Lytle, Lily Marks, Sango Tajima, Tyler Brunsman, Lauren Lopez, Dylan Saunders, StarKid Company	9:53
2.	"Aren't We an Odd Couple?"		Joe Walker, Brian Rosenthal	0:26
3.	"Different As Can Be"	A.J. Holmes	Joe Walker, Brian Rosenthal	2:15
4.	"Hey, Ginny. Check This Out..."		Darren Criss, Jaime Lyn Beatty	0:28
5.	"Ginny's Song"	Criss	Darren Criss	0:45
6.	"Harry"	Criss	Jaime Lyn Beatty	2:29
7.	"Different As Can Be" (Reprise)	Holmes	Joe Walker, Brian Rosenthal	1:05
8.	"The Dragon Song"	Criss	Darren Criss, StarKid Company	2:16
9.	"Hey Cho, Check This Out..."		Darren Criss	0:20
10.	"Ginny's Song Reprise (Cho's Song)"	Criss	Darren Criss	0:40
11.	"Granger Danger"	Criss	Joey Richter, Lauren Lopez	3:50
12.	"To Dance Again!"	Holmes	Joe Walker, Brian Rosenthal, StarKid Company	4:06
13.	"There Are Pieces of You Missing"		Joe Walker, Britney Coleman	0:23
14.	"Missing You"	Holmes	Darren Criss, Brian Rosenthal, Joe Walker	2:44
15.	"Not Alone"	Criss	Jaime Lyn Beatty, Darren Criss, Joey Richter, Bonnie Gruesen	4:18
16.	"Voldemort is Goin' Down"	Holmes	Joey Richter, Bonnie Gruesen, StarKid Company	2:19
17.	"Is Okay Good?"		Joe Walker, Brian Rosenthal	0:51
18.	"Not Alone/Goin' Back to Hogwarts" (Reprise)	Criss	StarKid Company	1:45
19.	"Pigfarts, Pigfarts Here I Come...." (Bonus Track)	Holmes	Lauren Lopez, Joe Walker	0:29

Writing credits

== Personnel ==
Featured Performers

Actor/Actress	Character
Darren Criss	Harry Potter
Joey Richter	Ron Weasley
Bonnie Gruesen	Hermione Granger
Lauren Lopez	Draco Malfoy
Jaime Lyn Beatty	Ginny Weasley
Joe Walker	Lord Voldemort
Dylan Saunders	Albus Dumbledore
Brian Rosenthal	Quirinus Quirrell
Joe Moses	Severus Snape
Britney Coleman	Bellatrix Lestrange
Tyler Brunsman	Cedric Diggory; Cornelius Fudge
Devin Lytle	Cho Chang
Richard Campbell	Neville Longbottom
Julia Albain	Vincent Crabbe
Sango Tajima	Lavender Brown
Jim Povolo	Gregory Goyle; RumbleRoar
Lily Marks	Pansy Parkinson; Molly Weasley

Band

- A.J. Holmes – piano
- Carlos Valdes – bass
- Joe Carroll – drums, guitar

== Release history ==
Website	Date
StarKid Productions official site	September 9, 2009
Bandcamp	July 29, 2010

== Other appearances ==
- The song "Harry" was previously released as "Sami" for the web-series Little White Lie (2009), and was later re-recorded for Darren Criss' Human EP and A Very StarKid Album, once again as "Sami."
- Darren Criss also re-recorded "Not Alone" for his Human EP and A Very StarKid Album.
