= An Intimate Evening with Lea Michele =

2017 concert tour by Lea Michele

- Tour by Lea Michele
- Location: North America • Europe
- Associated album: Places
- Start date: January 23, 2017
- End date: October 8, 2017
- Legs: 2
- No. of shows: 10 in North America; 1 in Europe; 11 in Total

Lea Michele concert chronology
- Glee Live! In Concert! (2010-2011); An Intimate Evening with Lea Michele (2017); LM/DC Tour (2018)

An Intimate Evening with Lea Michele (often called Places Tour) is a promotional tour by American singer Lea Michele, in support of her second studio album, Places (2017). The tour began on January 23, 2017 at Hotel Café.

== Background ==
On January 11, 2017, Michele announced on social media that she would go on a mini tour in January, saying, "My incredible fans have always been there for me. You inspire me. You've stood by me, cheered me on and lifted me up. When preparing for [this] upcoming album I wanted you all to know how important you are to me. These shows are a sneak peek into my upcoming album, as well as songs from Louder and maybe.. even a little Glee." Ticket presales for the shows were made available on January 12, 2017, and general ticket sales began the following day on January 13. The three shows were sold out later that same day.

At her Hotel Café show, Michele sang the following songs from her upcoming sophomore album, Places, live for the first time: "Run to You", "Heavy Love", "Anything's Possible", "Love Is Alive", "Sentimental Memories", and "Getaway Car". On March 3, 2017, Michele released "Love Is Alive" as the lead single from Places, and also confirmed the continuity of the tour by announcing she will be adding new tour dates. The additional dates for shows in the United States and Canada were announced on March 6, 2017. A single performance in London, England was announced on April 10, 2017, with presales beginning two days later on April 12.

== Set list ==
This set list is representative of the show in London on April 21, 2017. It is not representative of all concert set lists for the duration of the tour.

1. "Cannonball"
2. "Run to You"
3. "Love Is Alive"
4. "Battlefield"
5. "Sentimental Memories"
6. "Heavy Love"
7. "Anything's Possible"
8. "Glitter in the Air" (Pink cover)
9. "Poker Face" (Lady Gaga cover)
10. "Make You Feel My Love" (Adele cover)
11. "The Scientist" (Coldplay cover)
12. "Don't Stop Believin'" (Journey cover)
13. "Getaway Car"
14. "My Man" (Barbra Streisand cover)
15. "You're Mine"

Notes

- "Rolling in the Deep" was performed at the Philadelphia show with Jonathan Groff as a surprise guest

== Tour dates ==
List of concerts, showing date, city, country, venue, tickets sold (attendance), and gross revenue
Date	City	Country	Venue	Attendance	Revenue
North America
January 23, 2017	Los Angeles	United States	Hotel Café	—	—
January 26, 2017	New York City	United States	Appel Room	—	—
January 30, 2017	Santa Monica	United States	The Broad Stage	—	—
Europe
April 21, 2017	London	England	Shoreditch Town Hall	—	—
North America
May 1, 2017	Philadelphia	United States	Merriam Theater	1,087 / 1,512	$49,009
May 3, 2017	Boston	United States	Shubert Theatre	—	—
May 4, 2017	Ledyard	United States	Fox Theater	—	—
May 6, 2017	Toronto	Canada	Massey Hall	—	—
May 8, 2017	Seattle	United States	Moore Theatre	—	—
May 10, 2017	San Francisco	United States	Palace of Fine Arts	—	—
October 8, 2017 (Note: The October 8, 2017 concert in New York City was part of the 3rd Annual Elsie Fest.)	New York City	United States	Summerstage	—	—
Total				—	—
