= Christmas in NYC: Live in Concert =

2019 concert tour by Lea Michele

- Residency by Lea Michele
- Location: U.S., North America
- Associated album: Christmas in the City (2019)
- Start date: December 19, 2019
- End date: December 21, 2019
- Legs: 1
- No. of shows: 3 in America

Lea Michele concert chronology
- LM/DC Tour (2018); Christmas in NYC: Live in Concert (2019)

Christmas in NYC Live In Concert is a concert residency by American singer Lea Michele, in support of her third studio album and first holiday album, Christmas in the City. The residency was performed at The Concert Hall at NY Society for Ethical Culture in New York City.

== Background ==
On October 25, 2019, Michele announced on social media that she would perform 3 intimate shows in her hometown of New York City to go with the spirit of her new holiday album.

== Setlist ==
1. "The Most Wonderful Time of the Year"
2. "Silver Bells"
3. "I'll Be Home for Christmas"
4. "Rockin' Around the Christmas Tree"
5. "River"
6. "Silent Night"
7. "White Christmas"
8. "Don't Rain on My Parade"
9. "Poker Face"
10. "The Edge of Glory"
11. "Make You Feel My Love"
12. "Angels We Have Heard on High"
13. "Do You Want to Build a Snowman?"
14. "Last Christmas"
15. "O Holy Night"
16. "Christmas In New York"

Encore

17. "Have Yourself A Merry Little Christmas"

== Dates ==
Date	City	Country	Venue
North America
December 19, 2019	New York City	America	The Concert Hall at NY Society for Ethical Culture
December 20, 2019	New York City	America	The Concert Hall at NY Society for Ethical Culture
December 21, 2019	New York City	America	The Concert Hall at NY Society for Ethical Culture
