= If You Say So =

Song by Lea Michele

from the album Louder
- Recorded: July–August 2013
- Genre: Vocal; Traditional pop
- Length: 4:15
- Label: Columbia
- Songwriter(s): Lea Michele; Sia Furler; Chris Braide
- Producer(s): Chris Braide; Anne Preven

"If You Say So" is a song by the American singer Lea Michele, taken from her first studio album Louder (2014). It was written by Michele, Sia and Chris Braide, and was produced by the latter and Anne Preven. The song is about Michele's late boyfriend, Cory Monteith, and the aftermath of his death in July 2013.

The song was not originally on the track list for Louder, as Michele had already completed recording for the album, but in the wake of Monteith's death she contacted Furler to write a song with her in his memory. The song was one of the last to be recorded for the album, along with Michele's first single "Cannonball".

== Background and release ==
"If You Say So" was the last song Michele recorded for Louder. Whilst grieving for her late boyfriend (her Glee co-star Cory Monteith) Michele contacted Sia, with whom she had previously collaborated on her album, to write the song with her. The song was produced by Chris Braide and the Academy Award-nominated songwriter, Anne Preven.

Michele has spoken to Billboard about the song, saying, "It has both sides of the spectrum. Listening to it, it's therapeutic and difficult. It will always represent the most devastating thing that's ever happened to me in my whole life. But at the same time, music is therapy. It's been therapy for me in the entire grieving process and in my entire life. I'm grateful that Sia collaborated on that song with me... Music has just been so important and so helpful to me this whole year." Michele also told MTV, "I think at the time it was really early and everything, so I really don't even remember a lot of what I was feeling back then," Michele said of the writing and recording process of the song. "But I'm just thankful now, I think in any sense, whether it's difficult or whether it's good, music is such therapy, so for me this album as a whole has been very therapeutic and each song has helped me in a different way. I just think it's there, it's on the album. I could get into everything, I could talk about everything in depth, but everything that ended up on the record is a part of me, so I don't think I could have had a record without including all the aspects of my journey."

== Critical reception ==
The song received generally positive reviews from music critics. Jason Lipshutz of Billboard wrote, "If You Say So" takes place a week after the passing of its unnamed subject, with Michele repeating the phrase "seven whole days" while trying to shake off the numbness she feels. In the chorus, she recalls their last encounter, 'You said I love you girl/I said I love you more/And a breath, a pause, you said, if you say so/If you say so/If you say so.' The final verse is the most harrowing, with Michele declaring, 'I check my phone and wait to hear from you in a crowded room,' and the music builds as she concludes, 'I thought we would grow old/Mirrors in the smoke/Left me here to choke.'" Jessica Urgiles from The State Press wrote, "In "If You Say So", Michele reflects on the last conversation she had with Monteith and her inability to cope with his death. The rawness of the song will touch the hearts of Gleeks with its emotional and sincere lyrics, 'I can’t get away from the burning pain, I lie awake/And the fallen hero haunts my thoughts/How could you leave me this way?'"

Kyle Anderson of Entertainment Weekly wrote, "[Michele's] only revealing moment is the tender Cory Monteith tribute "If You Say So" which exposes the raw nerves beneath Michele's scrubbed professional skin." Emily Longeretta of HollywoodLife wrote, "You will absolutely need to get your tissues ready. Lea previously revealed in interviews that her record was done before the death of Cory, but she wanted to add a few songs – and "If You Say So" was one of those songs. The lyrics speak for themselves, as they walk us through the last conversation Lea had with Cory, and how she felt the following week. The song is definitely the most candid and real we've ever heard Lea."
