= Me and My Dick (soundtrack) =

Me and My Dick (A New Musical)

Cast recording by StarKid Productions
- Released: January 6, 2010
- Recorded: 2009
- Genre: Show tunes
- Length: 43:41
- Label: StarKid Productions

StarKid Productions chronology
A Very Potter Musical (2009)	Me and My Dick (A New Musical) (2010)	A Very StarKid Album (2010)

Me and My Dick (A New Musical) contains the songs from the musical Me and My Dick, produced by StarKid Productions with music and lyrics by A.J. Holmes, Carlos Valdes, and Darren Criss, and book by Eric Kahn Gale, Brian Holden, Matt Lang, and Nick Lang. It was recorded by the musical's cast and was released digitally on January 6, 2010, through iTunes. The soundtrack became the first-ever student-produced college musical to reach Billboard, debuting at No. 11 on the Top Cast Albums chart.

== Track listing ==
No.	Title	Writer(s)	Performer(s)	Length
1.	"Me and My Dick"	A.J. Holmes, Carlos Valdes	Joey Richter, Joe Walker	3:33
2.	"Ready to Go"	Darren Criss	Jaime Lyn Beatty, Devin Lytle, Joey Richter, Joe Walker, Ali Gordon, Alle-Faye Monka, Nicholas Joseph Strauss-Matathia, Brian Holden, StarKid Company	7:46
3.	"I've Seen You Around Here Before"	Holmes, Valdes	Joe Walker, Devin Lytle	2:52
4.	"There Ain't Nothing Like a Dick"	Holmes, Valdes	Nicholas Joseph Strauss-Matathia, Devin Lytle	2:10
5.	"Listen to Your Heart"	Holmes, Valdes	A.J. Holmes, Joey Richter	3:33
6.	"Land of the Dicks"	Holmes, Valdes	Arielle Goldman, Corey Dorris, StarKid Company	4:19
7.	"Even Though"	Criss	Joey Richter, Jaime Lyn Beatty, StarKid Company	3:24
8.	"Gotta Find His Dick"	Holmes, Valdes	Brian Holden, A.J. Holmes, StarKid Company	1:43
9.	"The Council of the Pussies"	Holmes, Valdes	Nicholas Joseph Strauss-Matathia, Lily Marks, Star Kid Company	2:18
10.	"Flight of the Pussies"	Holmes, Valdes	Nicholas Joseph Strauss-Matathia, Star Kid Company	1:40
11.	"Big T's Temptation"	Holmes, Valdes	Corey Dorris, Arielle Goldman, Ali Gordon, Alle-Faye Monka	2:59
12.	"Finale"	Criss	Joey Richter, Jaime Lyn Beatty, Devin Lytle, Joe Walker, A.J. Holmes, StarKid Company	3:37
13.	"Ready to Go" (Alternate Version)	Criss	Darren Criss	1:29
14.	"Even Though" (Alternate Version)	Criss	Darren Criss	2:18

== Personnel ==
Featured Performers

Actor/Actress	Character
Joey Richter	Joey Richter
Joe Walker	Dick
Jaime Lyn Beatty	Sally
Devin Lytle	Miss Cooter
Ali Gordon	Vanessa
Alle-Faye Monka	Tiffany
Nicholas Joseph Strauss-Matathia	The Old Snatch
Brian Holden	Flopsy
A.J. Holmes	Joey's Heart
Corey Dorris	Big T
Arielle Goldman	Weenie
Lily Marks	Sally's Heart; High Council Pussy
Richard Campbell	Rick; The Kid That Hates Joey
Joe Moses	Rick's Dick

Band

- A.J. Holmes - piano
- Clark Baxtresser - keyboard
- Andy Warren - trumpet
- Ryan Proch - clarinet, alto saxophone
- Sam Crittenden - trombone
- Darren Criss - guitar
- Carlos Valdes - bass
- Jack Stratton - drums

== Chart performance ==
Chart (2010)	Peak position
US Billboard Top Cast Albums	11

== Other appearances ==
- The alternate versions of "Ready to Go" and "Even Though" were also released on the A Very StarKid Album.
