= A Very Potter Sequel (EP) =

Cast recording (EP) by StarKid Productions
- Released: July 31, 2010
- Recorded: 2010
- Genre: Showtunes
- Length: 17:33
- Label: StarKid Productions

StarKid Productions chronology
A Very StarKid Album (2010)	A Very Potter Sequel (2010)	Starship (2011)

The A Very Potter Sequel cast extended play (EP) contains songs from the musical A Very Potter Sequel, sequel to the Harry Potter parody musical A Very Potter Musical, produced by StarKid Productions with music and lyrics by Darren Criss (who also starred in both musicals as Harry Potter) and book by Matt Lang, Nick Lang, and Brian Holden, that were not released on A Very StarKid Album. The EP was released digitally on July 31, 2010, through the group's Bandcamp site.

== Track listing ==
All tracks are written by Darren Criss.

No.	Title	Performer(s)	Length
1.	"Not Over Yet"	Tyler Brunsman, Corey Dorris, StarKid Company	5:49
2.	"Harry Freakin' Potter"	Joey Richter, Jaime Lyn Beatty, Darren Criss, StarKid Company	4:31
3.	"Hermione Can't Draw"	StarKid Company	1:16
4.	"Gettin' Along"	Dylan Saunders, Joe Walker	2:39
5.	"Guys Like Potter"	Tyler Brunsman, Joe Moses	3:18

== Personnel ==
Featured Performers

Actor/Actress	Character
Darren Criss	Harry Potter
Joey Richter	Ron Weasley
Bonnie Gruesen	Hermione Granger
Lauren Lopez	Draco Malfoy
Joe Walker	Dolores Umbridge
Joe Moses	Severus Snape
Brian Holden	Remus Lupin
Dylan Saunders	Albus Dumbledore
Tyler Brunsman	Lucius Malfoy
Jim Povolo	Gregory Goyle; Firenze; Bill Weasley (uncredited); Past Draco (uncredited)
Jaime Lyn Beatty	Rita Skeeter; Ginny Weasley (uncredited)
Nicholas Joseph Strauss-Matathia	Sirius Black
Corey Dorris	Yaxley
Devin Lytle	Cho Chang; Charlie Weasley (uncredited)
Arielle Goldman	Lily Potter; Luna Lovegood; Hedwig; Fred Weasley
Brian Rosenthal	Seamus Finnigan; James Potter; Past Ron; King's Cross Person (uncredited)
Britney Coleman	Dean Thomas
Lily Marks	Molly Weasley
Richard Campbell	Neville Longbottom; Past Hermione
Sango Tajima	Lavender Brown; George Weasley; Past Harry
Julia Albain	Vincent Crabbe; Percy Weasley; Candy Lady
Nick Lang	Arthur Weasley; Sorty; Scarfy; Peter Pettigrew; Mama Umbridge

Band

- Bruce Keisling – piano
- Clark Baxtresser – keyboard
- Chris Lorentz – bass guitar
- Corey Richardson – lead guitar
- Jack Stratton – drums
