= Love Is Alive (Lea Michele song) =

Single by Lea Michele

from the album Places
- Released: March 3, 2017
- Recorded: 2016
- Genre: Traditional pop
- Length: 3:35
- Label: Columbia
- Songwriters: Chantal Kreviazuk; Nathan Chapman
- Producer: Xandy Barry

Lea Michele singles chronology
"On My Way" (2014)	"Love Is Alive" (2017)	"It's the Most Wonderful Time of the Year" (2019)

"Love Is Alive" is a single by American singer Lea Michele. It was released on March 3, 2017 by Columbia Records as the lead single from her sophomore album, Places (2017). The song was written by Chantal Kreviazuk and Nathan Chapman, and produced by Xandy Barry.

== Theme and composition ==
In an interview with People, Michele said that "Love Is Alive" was the song that "represented where [she is] personally in [her] life right now." She also stated, "It made me so happy while recording it, and I hope it brings the same light and joy to everyone else as it has for me." The song was written by Canadian singer-songwriter Chantal Kreviazuk and record producer Nathan Chapman, who is primarily known for his work in country music.

== Live performances ==
Michele performed the song live for the first time on The Late Late Show with James Corden on March 14, 2017, marking her first time as a musical guest on the show. Michele's appearance was met with positive reviews; Billboard's Lauren Tom wrote, "The emotional performance showcased Michele's strong vocal ability and fit perfectly with all of the powerful moments of the song." Idolator's Mike Wass wrote, "I'm not sure what it says about the state of the music industry when simply standing in front of a microphone and singing in key feels like a revolutionary act, but Lea Michele's appearance on The Late Late Show was a breath of fresh air. After struggling to find a niche in the pop world with debut LP, Louder, the 30-year-old has seemingly turned her back on it altogether on Places – and the music is all the better for it."

== Critical reception ==
Idolator's Mike Wass said the song represents a departure from her debut studio album, writing "[It is] a lot more subdued and refined than the heavily produced ballads on Louder, and feels like a more organic fit." Michiel Vos from A Bit of Pop Music wrote, "In comparison to the stunning but trend chasing "Cannonball" ... the new track is a lot more traditional. It is a proper ballad, mostly based on piano which later is joined by an orchestra of strings. [Michele] delivers some serious big diva vocals and the chorus of the track soars beautifully. This is absolutely not in touch with what is hot in the charts at the moment, but that seems to be the exact point."

== Charts ==
Chart (2017)	Peak position
France (SNEP)	150

== Release history ==
Country	Date	Format	Label
Worldwide	March 3, 2017	Digital download	Columbia
