= Helen Simpson (author) =

British writer

Helen Simpson FRSL
- Born: 1959 (age 66–67); Bristol, England, United Kingdom
- Education: University of Oxford
- Occupation: Short-story writer
- Awards: Somerset Maugham Award; Sunday Times Young Writer of the Year Award; Hawthornden Prize; PEN/O.Henry Award

Helen Simpson (born 1959) is an English short story writer.

== Early life and education ==
Simpson was born in Bristol, in the West of England, and grew up first in Wealdstone, then in a suburb of Croydon, where she attended a girls' school. Her mother was a primary-school teacher and her father was a naval architect, who later taught. The first from her family to go to university, Simpson read English at the University of Oxford where she wrote a thesis on Restoration farce.

== Career ==
Simpson worked at Vogue for five years, before her success in writing short stories meant she could afford to leave and concentrate full-time on her writing.

Her first collection, Four Bare Legs in a Bed and Other Stories, 1990, won the Somerset Maugham Award and the Sunday Times Young Writer of the Year Award, and was followed in 1995 by a second collection, Dear George. Hey Yeah Right Get A Life, 2000, a series of interlinked stories, won the Hawthornden Prize, and was renamed Getting a Life for its US publication. She was awarded the E.M. Forster Award in 2002 by the American Academy of Arts and Letters. Her more recent story collections are: Constitutional (2005), renamed In the Driver's Seat for its US publication; In-Flight Entertainment (2010); and Cockfosters (2015). A Bunch of Fives: Selected Stories was published in 2012.

In 1993, she was selected as one of Granta's top 20 novelists under the age of 40.

In 2007, she published Homework short story. In 2009, she donated the short story "The Tipping Point" to Oxfam's "Ox-Tales" project, four collections of UK stories written by 38 authors. Her story was published in the "Air" collection. She was a writer-in-residence for the charity First Story.

Many of her stories have been broadcast on BBC Radio, including "Café Society" and "Hurrah for the Hols" read by Tamsin Greig and abridged and produced by Amber Barnfather.

In 2011, Simpson received a PEN/O.Henry Award for her story "Diary of an Interesting Year". She was elected a Fellow of the Royal Society of Literature in 1996.
