= Christmas in the City (Lea Michele album) =

Studio album by Lea Michele
- Released: October 25, 2019
- Genre: Christmas
- Length: 35:16
- Language: English
- Label: Sony
- Producer: Peer Åström; Adam Anders

Lea Michele chronology
Places (2017)	Christmas in the City (2019)	Forever: A Lullaby Album (2021)

Singles from Christmas in the City
- 1. "It's the Most Wonderful Time of the Year" Released: September 19, 2019; 2. "Christmas in New York" Released: November 19, 2019

Christmas in the City is the third studio album by American singer Lea Michele. It was released through Sony Music Entertainment on October 25, 2019. The album was produced by Peer Åström and Adam Anders, who produced the tracks featured on Glee. Christmas in the City features an original track, "Christmas in New York", and three duets—Michele sings with Jonathan Groff on "I'll Be Home for Christmas", with Darren Criss on "White Christmas" and with Cynthia Erivo on "Angels We Have Heard on High". "It's the Most Wonderful Time of the Year" was released ahead of the album on September 19, 2019 as the lead single.

== Background ==
Michele titled the album Christmas in the City as she grew up in New York City, calling the season "such a beautiful time of year". She also said it was "always [her] dream to make a Christmas record [...] every single song that I picked [...] these are my most favorite Christmas songs." Michele called the original track, "Christmas in New York", "the real anthem of the album", elaborating that "it paints this beautiful picture of New York, but it also is really about what it means to be with your family and friends and engaged in that holiday spirit".

== Singles ==
"It's the Most Wonderful Time of the Year" was released as the lead single along with the album pre-order on September 19, 2019. The song included in the soundtrack of Same Time, Next Christmas (2019), a television movie in which Michele is a co-star.

"Christmas in New York" was released as the second single from the album. Its music video was released on November 19, 2019. The song was ranked by Billboard the 23rd "Best Christmas Songs of the 21st Century".

== Track listing ==
No.	Title	Writer(s)	Length
1.	"It's the Most Wonderful Time of the Year"	Edward Pola; George Wyle	2:32
2.	"Have Yourself a Merry Little Christmas"	Hugh Martin; Ralph Blane	2:45
3.	"Christmas in New York"	Adam Anders; Lea Michele; Nikki Anders; Peer Astrom	3:15
4.	"I'll Be Home for Christmas" (featuring Jonathan Groff)	Buck Ram; Walter Kent	3:13
5.	"Do You Want to Build a Snowman?"	Kristen Anderson-Lopez; Robert Lopez	3:03
6.	"Rockin' Around the Christmas Tree"	Johnny Marks	2:57
7.	"Silent Night"	Franz Xaver Gruber	3:13
8.	"White Christmas" (featuring Darren Criss)	Irving Berlin	3:14
9.	"Silver Bells"	Jay Livingston; Ray Evans	2:32
10.	"Angels We Have Heard on High" (featuring Cynthia Erivo)	Traditional	3:29
11.	"O Holy Night"	Adolphe Adam	5:03
Total length:			35:16

Japanese bonus track
No.	Title	Writer(s)	Length
12.	"White Christmas"	Irving Berlin	3:13
Total length:			38:29

== Charts ==
Chart (2019)	Peak position
Australian Digital Albums (ARIA)	25
Belgian Albums (Ultratop Flanders)	175
Belgian Albums (Ultratop Flanders)	140
US Top Album Sales (Billboard)	24
US Top Holiday Albums (Billboard)	3
