= A Very StarKid Album =

Compilation album by StarKid Productions
- Released: July 22, 2010
- Recorded: 2010
- Genre: Showtunes
- Length: 33:19
- Label: StarKid Productions

StarKid Productions chronology
Me and My Dick (A New Musical) (2010)	A Very StarKid Album (2010)	A Very Potter Sequel (2010)

A Very StarKid Album contains several songs from the musical A Very Potter Sequel, sequel to the Harry Potter parody musical A Very Potter Musical, produced by StarKid Productions with music and lyrics by Darren Criss (who also starred in both musicals as Harry Potter), and book by Matt Lang, Nick Lang, and Brian Holden. The album features seven of the twelve songs from A Very Potter Sequel as well as tracks from others members of the group. Songs from the musical that were absent from the album were later released as the A Very Potter Sequel soundtrack. The album was released digitally through iTunes and Amazon.com on July 22, 2010, and was made available on the StarKid Productions Bandcamp page on August 3, 2010. The album reached No. 14 on the iTunes Pop Charts and No. 27 out of all Top Albums officially topping Lady Gaga (#29) and Glee (#31) on the charts. The album also reached No. 19 on Top Compilations.

== Track listing ==
All tracks are written by Darren Criss.

No.	Title	Performer(s)	Length
1.	"Days of Summer" (from a A Very Potter Sequel)	Darren Criss, Joey Richter, Bonnie Gruesen, Lauren Lopez, StarKid Company	2:08
2.	"To Have a Home" (from A Very Potter Sequel)	Darren Criss	3:55
3.	"The Coolest Girl" (from A Very Potter Sequel)	Bonnie Gruesen	3:16
4.	"Let the Games Begin" (from A Very Potter Sequel)	StarKid Company	2:59
5.	"Those Voices" (from A Very Potter Sequel)	Darren Criss, Nicholas Joseph Strauss-Matathia, Brian Rosenthal, Arielle Goldman	3:14
6.	"Stutter" (from A Very Potter Sequel)	Joe Walker	2:47
7.	"No Way" (from A Very Potter Sequel)	Darren Criss, Lauren Lopez, Joey Richter, Bonnie Gruesen	2:02
8.	"Not Alone" (re-recorded version of a song from A Very Potter Musical)	Darren Criss	4:19
9.	"Sami" (from Little White Lie, similar to "Harry" from A Very Potter Musical)	Darren Criss	3:42
10.	"Ready to Go" (from Me and My Dick)	Darren Criss	1:25
11.	"Even Though" (from Me and My Dick)	Darren Criss	2:16
12.	"Sango, Sango, Sango"	StarKid Company	0:24
13.	"Liam's Got a Phone Call"	The Liams!	0:52

== Personnel ==
Featured Performers

Actor/Actress	Character
Darren Criss	Harry Potter
Joey Richter	Ron Weasley
Bonnie Gruesen	Hermione Granger
Lauren Lopez	Draco Malfoy
Joe Walker	Dolores Umbridge; Voldemort
Joe Moses	Severus Snape
Brian Holden	Remus Lupin
Dylan Saunders	Albus Dumbledore
Tyler Brunsman	Lucius Malfoy
Jim Povolo	Gregory Goyle; Firenze; Bill Weasley (uncredited); Past Draco (uncredited)
Jaime Lyn Beatty	Rita Skeeter; Ginny Weasley (uncredited)
Nicholas Joseph Strauss-Matathia	Sirius Black
Corey Dorris	Yaxley
Devin Lytle	Cho Chang; Charlie Weasley (uncredited)
Arielle Goldman	Lily Potter; Luna Lovegood; Hedwig; Fred Weasley
Brian Rosenthal	Seamus Finnigan; James Potter; Past Ron; King's Cross Person (uncredited)
Britney Coleman	Dean Thomas
Lily Marks	Molly Weasley
Richard Campbell	Neville Longbottom; Past Hermione
Sango Tajima	Lavender Brown; George Weasley; Past Harry
Julia Albain	Vincent Crabbe; Percy Weasley; Candy Lady
Nick Lang	Arthur Weasley; Sorty; Scarfy; Peter Pettigrew; Mama Umbridge

Band

- Bruce Keisling – piano
- Clark Baxtresser – keyboard
- Chris Lorentz – bass guitar
- Corey Richardson – lead guitar
- Jack Stratton – drums

== Release history ==
Website	Date
iTunes/Amazon.com	July 22, 2010
Bandcamp	August 3, 2010

== Chart performance ==
Chart (2010)	Peak position
US Billboard Top Compilation Albums	19

== Other appearances ==
- "Sami" was previously released as part of the web-series Little White Lie (2009), and was re-written as "Harry" for the A Very Potter Musical.
- "Not Alone" is a re-recorded version of a song from A Very Potter Musical.
- "Not Alone" and "Sami" were also released on Darren Criss' Human EP.
- "Ready to Go" and "Even Though" were also released on the Me and My Dick soundtrack.
