= Homework (short story) =

2007 short story by Helen Simpson

"Homework" is a short story written by Helen Simpson and published in 2007.

== Plot summary ==
The opening of the story begins with George entering the house complaining to his mother that his English teacher, Mr. Mottram, has assigned the students a three-page paper that must describe an event that changed their life. As George continues to complain that he does not like the assigned topic, his mother realizes that he had all of the Easter holidays to complete this assignment. Although his mother should scold him for not doing his assignment during the holiday, she feels sympathy for her son and says that she will only help him this one time. George agrees with his mother's proposition, and they begin to compile ideas for George's three page paper.

George's mother begins developing ideas to write about such as parents getting divorced, extreme arguments, terrifying dreams, and major life rearrangements after divorce. Despite all the ideas, George is hesitant about writing them in his paper because none of the ideas are actually happening in his life. The more ideas George's mother contributes, the more hesitant George becomes to writing them. She continues to add ideas about George having an older sister, the father having another woman in his life, and the way the woman intrudes on the attention the children get from their father. George's mother notices the worried expression on George's face and explains that there is no problem with him writing about the ideas because it is considered creative writing

After constant explanation from his mother that Mr. Mottram will never know if the story is true or false, George becomes less hesitant and feels more confident about writing his three-page paper. At the end of the story, George realizes that he has become more capable of writing his paper and as a result, he sends his mother away while stating he can write the paper on his own.

== Characters and setting ==
- The narrator- An adoring unnamed mother who helps her son with homework when he comes home complaining about his English assignment. She wants to help her son, but does not realize how uncomfortable her ideas are making her son.
- George- The narrators 13-year-old son who struggles to find ideas for his English paper. He is extremely uncomfortable with the ideas his mother provides for his paper because he thinks he will get in trouble by his teacher for lying.
- Mr. Mottram- George's English teacher who assigns his students a three-page paper.

== Sources ==
- Charters, Ann. Comp. The Story And Its Writer Compact, An Introduction To Short Fiction. 8th. Boston: Bedford/st Martins, 2011. 770–776. Print.
- https://www.theguardian.com/books/2006/jan/07/featuresreviews.guardianreview9
- Homework sources
