= On My Way (Lea Michele song) =

Single by Lea Michele

from the album Louder
- Released: May 4, 2014
- Recorded: 2013
- Genre: Pop
- Length: 3:45
- Label: Columbia
- Songwriters: Ali Tamposi; Marcus Lomax; Jordan Johnson; Stefan Johnson; Clarence Coffee Jr.; Fernando Garibay
- Producers: The Monsters and the Strangerz; Kuk Harrell

Lea Michele singles chronology
"Cannonball" (2013)	"On My Way" (2014)	"Love Is Alive" (2017)

Music video
- "On My Way" on YouTube

"On My Way" is the second single released by American singer Lea Michele, taken from her debut studio album Louder (2014). It was released via digital download onto iTunes on May 4, 2014. The song was written by songwriters Ali Tamposi and Fernando Garibay, along with music producers Marcus Lomax, Jordan Johnson, Stefan Johnson and Clarence Coffee Jr., and was produced by The Monsters and the Strangerz and Kuk Harrell.

== Live performances ==
Michele gave her first live performance of "On My Way" on The Ellen DeGeneres Show on March 19, 2014, after revealing on her Twitter account that the song would be the next single from Louder. Broadway.com reported of the performance, "The blossoming pop star proved once again that nothing beats a live performance."

== Critical reception ==
The song has received generally positive reviews from music critics. Casey Lewis from Teen Vogue wrote, "...While "On My Way" boasts a powerful bass-heavy beat that's a bit of departure from the recent tracks we've heard from her, the lyrics are just as emotionally charged as what we've come to expect. This time around, she touches on a battle between her head and her heart (hey, who hasn't been there!)."

Christina Garibaldi from MTV News wrote, "The upbeat track, which is the fifth song Michele has previewed from her March 4 album, starts off slowly building its beat, with her powerful vocals packing a punch as she shows off a more vulnerable side." Mike Ayers from Billboard wrote of the song, "Michele starts off with a slow, pouty vocal that quickly gives way to another club-oriented track that's about returning to someone who's not right for you. Sobriety and intoxication comparisons to love run rampant throughout, as she belts out that her "heart's too drunk to drive" and she exists in a "blackout state of mind."

== Music video ==
Michele recorded the music video for the song on April 19, 2014, in several locations in California, including a motel. The video was released on Michele's VEVO channel on May 19, 2014, after an interview on Good Morning America. In the lead up to the release, Michele posted preview clips and behind the scenes footage of the music video onto her YouTube channel. The video was directed by Hannah Lux Davis.

== Charts ==
Chart (2014)	Peak position
Belgium (Ultratip Bubbling Under Flanders)	40
Canada (Canadian Hot 100)	81
France (SNEP)	45
Italy (FIMI)	68
Spain (Promusicae)	45

== Release dates ==
Country	Date	Format	Label
United States	May 4, 2014	Digital download	Columbia
