= Darren Criss =

American actor, singer, and songwriter

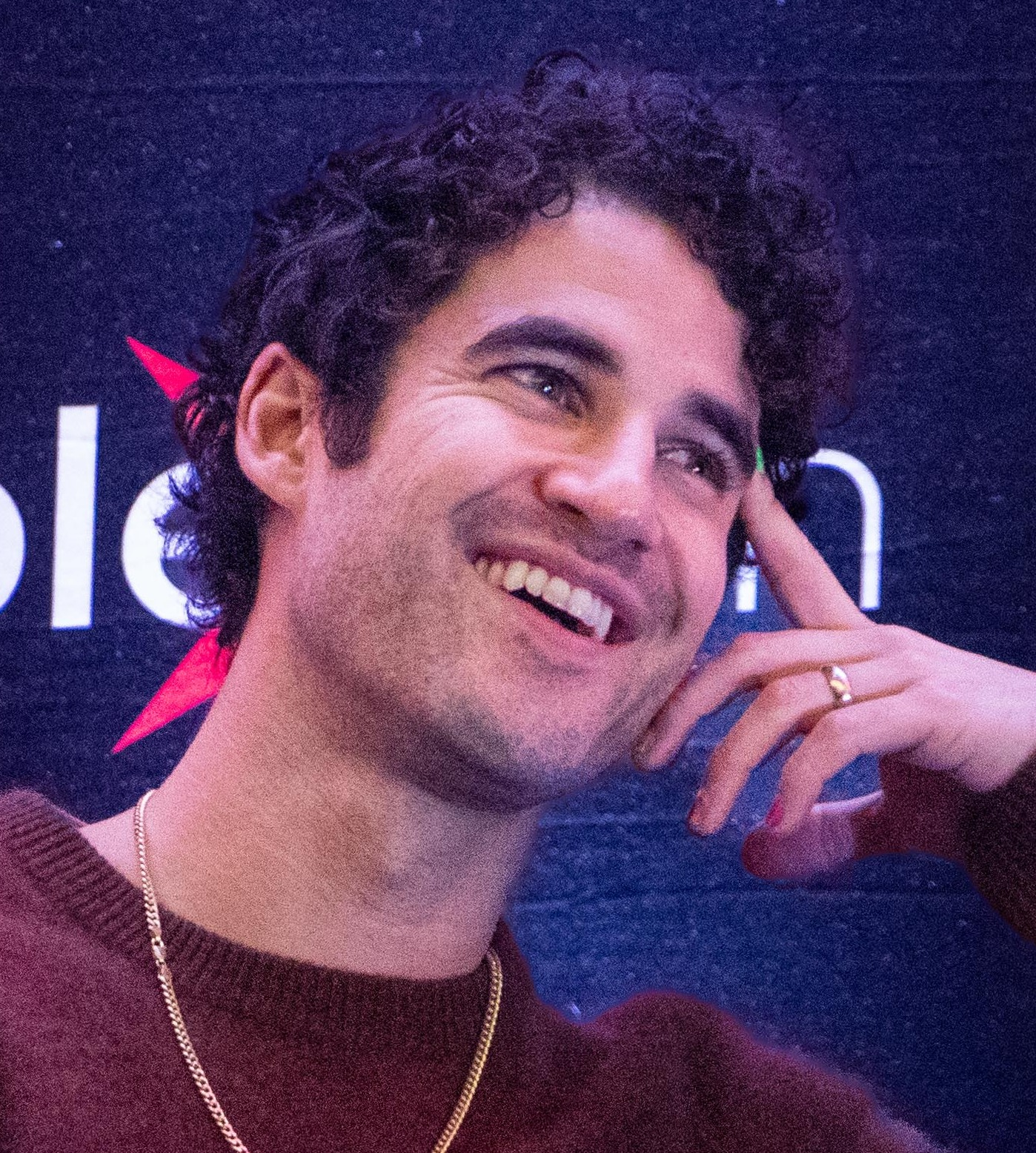
- Criss in 2023
- Born: Darren Everett Criss; February 5, 1987 (age 39); San Francisco, California, U.S.
- Education: University of Michigan (BFA)
- Occupations: Actor; singer; songwriter
- Years active: 1997–present
- Spouse: Mia Swier (m. 2019)
- Children: 2
- Musical career
- Genre: Pop
- Instruments: Vocals; piano; guitar; violin; drums; mandolin; harmonica
- Years active: 2005–present
- Labels: Sony; Columbia
- Website: www.darrencriss.com

Darren Everett Criss (born February 5, 1987) is an American actor, singer, and songwriter. He rose to fame starring on the television series Glee (2010–2015) and received a Primetime Emmy Award and a Golden Globe Award for his leading role as spree killer Andrew Cunanan in The Assassination of Gianni Versace: American Crime Story (2018). He has also appeared on Broadway and in film and has released several musical albums.

A founding member and co-owner of StarKid Productions, a musical theater company based in Los Angeles, Criss first garnered attention playing the lead role of Harry Potter in (and writing most of the music and lyrics for) StarKid's musical production of A Very Potter Musical. Criss has also starred on Broadway as a replacement in both How to Succeed in Business Without Really Trying and Hedwig and the Angry Inch. In 2015, Criss co-founded Elsie Fest which is touted as "New York City's first outdoor music festival celebrating tunes from the stage and screen".

In March 2017, Criss debuted his indie pop band Computer Games along with his brother Chuck Criss. In addition to his music endeavors, Criss starred in the second installment of Ryan Murphy's American Crime Story. Subtitled The Assassination of Gianni Versace (2018), Criss's portrayal of spree killer Andrew Cunanan received acclaim from critics, and earned him an Emmy Award for Outstanding Lead Actor in a Limited Series or Movie and a Golden Globe Award for Best Actor – Miniseries, or Television Film.

In 2025, Criss won two Tony Awards, for Best Actor in a Musical, becoming the first Asian American actor to win in the category, and for Best Musical as co-producer, both for Maybe Happy Ending.

== Early life and education ==
Criss was born in San Francisco, California, the youngest child of Cerina and Charles William Criss, an investment banker and a patron of the arts. He had an older brother, Charles "Chuck" Criss, who was a member of the band Freelance Whales. His mother, a native of Cebu, Philippines, is of Chinese, Filipino and Spanish descent while his father, a native of Pittsburgh, Pennsylvania, was of English, German, and Irish descent. Criss was raised primarily in San Francisco, apart from 1988 to 1992, when the family resided in Honolulu, Hawaii, where his father started EastWest Bank, serving as chairman and CEO. Criss says that while living in San Francisco, he faked a British accent for four years since he had told a woman that he was from Britain and the woman, unbeknownst to him, lived close to his parents' house.

Criss attended Catholic schools. He completed his elementary education at Stuart Hall for Boys, and later graduated from St. Ignatius College Preparatory in 2005. In 2009, Criss obtained his bachelor of fine arts from the University of Michigan, majoring in theatre performance and minoring in musicology and Italian.

=== Musical and theatrical training ===
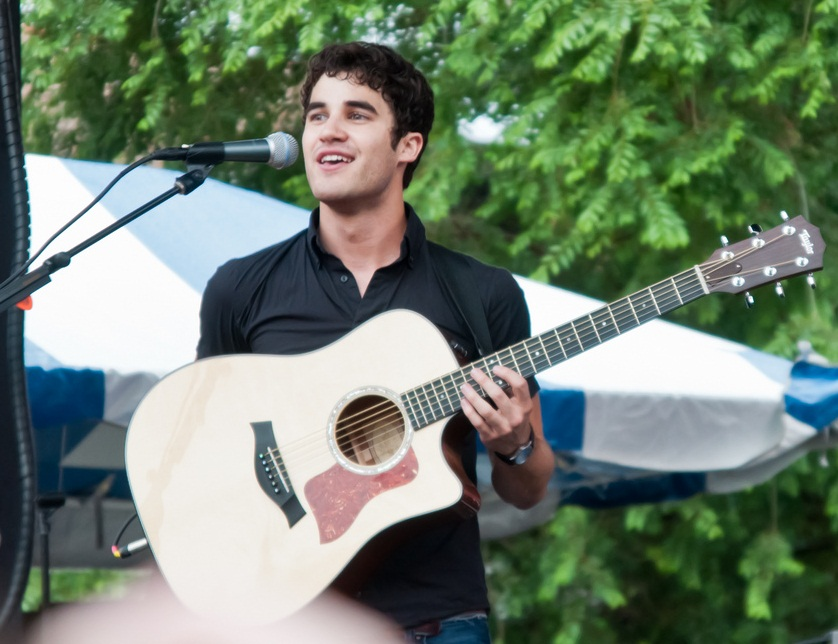
Darren Criss at Northalsted Market Days in Chicago

Criss' interest in music started in early childhood; at age five, he began taking violin lessons and was classically trained for the next fifteen years. Criss taught himself how to play other instruments, including guitar, piano, mandolin, harmonica, and drums. In high school, Criss immersed himself in music – he held the position of concertmaster in the school orchestra, he fronted his own band, and was voted "most likely to win a Grammy" by his peers. When he was fifteen, Criss began learning music composition and wrote his first song, which he later used as the title track of his first EP Human, released in 2009.

Criss also showed an interest for the performing arts. At age ten, he was accepted into the American Conservatory Theater (Young Conservatory program) where he studied theater performance throughout his formative years. At St. Ignatius, he was a member of the performing arts program and acted in work, including, The Music Man, The Diary of Anne Frank, and Fiddler on the Roof. He was active as both an actor and director in the University of Michigan's student-run theater organization Basement Arts. In 2008, he spent a semester abroad studying Italian theater at the Accademia dell'Arte in Arezzo, Italy.

== Career ==
=== 1997–2009: Theatre debut, StarKid Productions ===
Criss made his professional stage debut at the age of ten as Cesario in 42nd Street Moon's production of Fanny (1997), then played Mauro in the Richard Rodgers and Stephen Sondheim musical Do I Hear a Waltz? (1998), and Beauregard Calhoun in Babes in Arms (1999). Throughout his adolescence, Criss appeared in a number of the American Conservatory Theater's plays, notably A Christmas Carol, A Midsummer Night's Dream, and The Voysey Inheritance.

At the University of Michigan, he performed in stage productions such as Pride and Prejudice, A Few Good Men, and The Cripple of Inishmaan. Criss began his solo music career while attending the University of Michigan. Playing in small venues, he developed his own musical repertoire which today consists of standards from the Great American Songbook, contemporary songs, Disney songs, and his own compositions. Criss started his television career with a five-episode arc playing the character of Josh Burton on Eastwick in 2009. The following year, he appeared in an episode of the series Cold Case.

Upon receiving his Bachelor of Fine Arts in 2009, Criss, along with some friends and classmates from the University of Michigan, co-founded StarKid Productions, a musical theater company. His most prominent acting role with StarKid has been that of Harry Potter in the musical comedies A Very Potter Musical, A Very Potter Sequel, and A Very Potter Senior Year (based on the Harry Potter series of novels by J. K. Rowling). Criss is credited as one of the primary songwriters and composers for StarKid Productions. He has contributed songs to A Very Potter Musical, Me and My Dick (which became the first-ever student-produced college musical to reach Billboard, debuting at number 11 on the Top Cast Albums chart), Little White Lie, and A Very Potter Senior Year. Subsequently, Criss solely composed all the songs and music for A Very Potter Sequel, its companion album A Very StarKid Album, and Starship, which landed at number one on the Billboard Top Cast Albums chart, and at number 134 on the Billboard 200 chart.

=== 2010–2015: Breakthrough with Glee ===
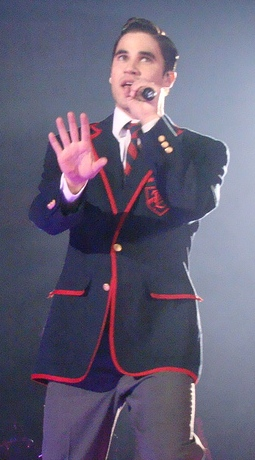
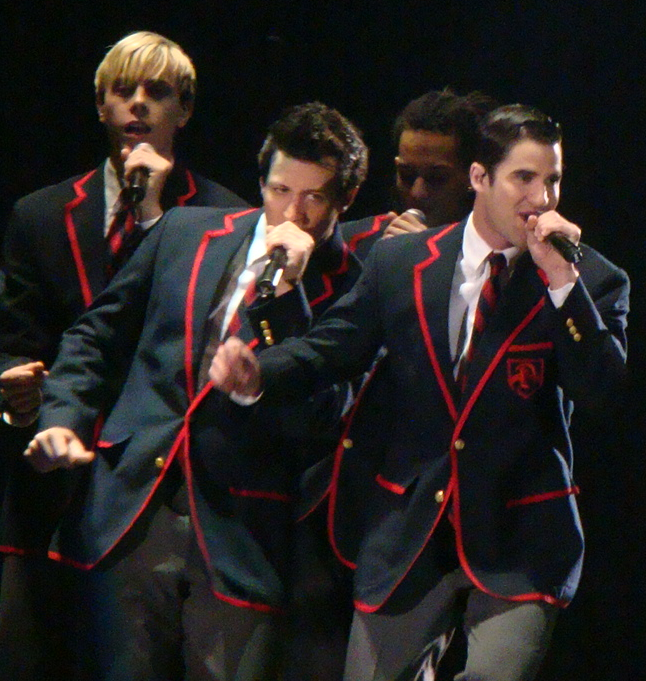
Criss as Blaine Anderson, performing solo (left) and with The Dalton Academy Warblers

==== Glee ====
Criss portrayed Blaine Anderson, on the Fox television series Glee. He made his first appearance in season two in the episode "Never Been Kissed", which aired on November 9, 2010. Blaine attended Dalton Academy and was lead singer of its glee club, The Dalton Academy Warblers. His first performance, "Teenage Dream" by Katy Perry, was featured on the soundtrack album Glee: The Music, Volume 4. It reached number eight on the Billboard Hot 100 in the week ending November 27, 2010, and number one on the Billboard Digital Songs chart. It was the best-selling song in the US that week, selling 214,000 copies, the largest figure for a Glee title. It was only the second US-certified gold single in the show's history.

Both Billboard's Jillian Mapes and Erica Futterman of Rolling Stone deemed "Teenage Dream" the best song of "Never Been Kissed", the episode in which it featured. The New York Daily News's Anthony Benigno gave the song an "A", and noted that it was "flawless" and improved on Perry's original. The performance was nominated for the Best Gay Moment of the Year and Favorite Music Video awards at the 2010 AfterElton.com Visibility Awards. A Billboard cover-feature on Criss noted that the performance "arguably ushered in the trend of more current pop hits being reworked by the [Glee] cast."

Later songs performed by Blaine and the Warblers became popular enough to create a Warbler soundtrack album, Glee: The Music Presents the Warblers. It debuted at No. 2 on the US Billboard 200 and No. 1 on Billboard's Soundtracks chart, selling 86,000 copies in its first week. The Warbler tracks had sold over 1.3 million copies as singles by the time the album was released.

Blaine initially served as a friend and mentor for Kurt, the bullied gay member of the Warblers' rival glee club, New Directions. Chemistry between the two characters, combined with fan support for the potential couple, led series co-creator Ryan Murphy to pair them romantically onscreen. At the beginning of the third season, Blaine transfers to McKinley High and joins New Directions; concurrently, Criss was promoted from recurring guest star to the show's main cast. In the subsequent seasons, Blaine goes off to college and later returns to Dalton to become the vocal director of the Warblers. From May 21 – July 3, 2011, Criss and the cast of Glee performed in Glee Live! In Concert!, touring the US, Canada, England, and Ireland. According to Billboard, it was the 16th most successful concert tour of 2011, grossing more than $40 million, with total attendance topping 485,000. All 40 dates sold out, including shows at Staples Center, Nassau Coliseum, and The O_{2} Arenas in London and Dublin.

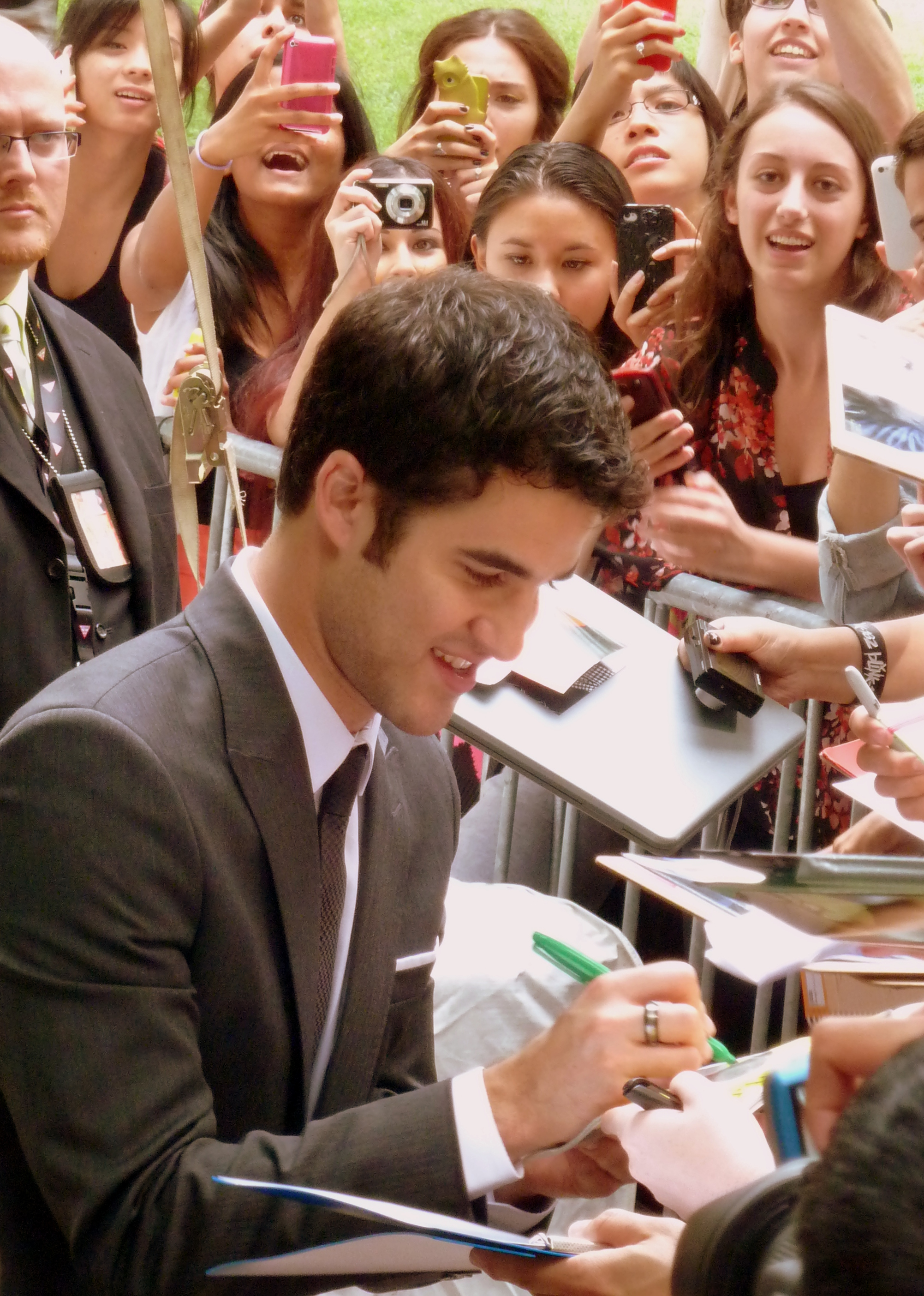
Criss signing autographs during the premiere of Girl Most Likely

In the final season, he marries his long-time love, Kurt. Discussing public response to his character, Criss stated that he particularly enjoyed comments from "people from parts of the world who are maybe not as exposed to certain ideologies", but had reconsidered their stance on relationships and human rights as a result of the Blaine and Kurt storyline. He called this response "phenomenal" and said, "I was a straight kid growing up in a very gay community and it's something that I've had to watch so many friends have to struggle with and have no place to go to identify in kind of a grander media culture. To be a small piece of that machine is incredibly wonderful." Criss composed "Rise" for the episode "The Rise and Fall of Sue Sylvester" and "This Time" for the series finale. Criss was nominated for a Primetime Emmy Award for Outstanding Original Music and Lyrics for writing "This Time".

==== Other work ====
On July 20, 2010, Criss released an independently produced EP called Human. Describing his album as "soul-folk" to Entertainment Weekly, it peaked at No. 17 on the Billboard Top Heatseekers Albums chart. On December 10, 2010, Criss became the 400,000th member of the American Society of Composers, Authors and Publishers (ASCAP). In April 2011, he signed with Sony Music Entertainment. He is in the process of recording a full-length studio album, with a release date yet to be determined. In November 2011, Criss participated in StarKid's first national concert tour, The SPACE Tour, for the New York and Boston shows, and, in the summer of 2012, he joined them again for their second national tour, Apocalyptour, for the Los Angeles and New York shows.

In January 2012, Criss made his Broadway debut, replacing Daniel Radcliffe in the role of J. Pierrepont Finch in the revival of How to Succeed in Business Without Really Trying for a three-week engagement at the Al Hirschfeld Theatre. His stint there proved to be a success: apart from Daniel Radcliffe's final week, the musical had the three most lucrative weeks of its 11-month run with Criss in the lead role, grossing more than four million dollars. Criss made his feature film debut in the comedy Girl Most Likely. It premiered at the Toronto International Film Festival (TIFF) and was released nationwide on July 19, 2013. Previously titled Imogene, the film starred Kristen Wiig, Annette Bening, and Matt Dillon.

In January 2013, Criss performed for US President Barack Obama, First Lady Michelle Obama, and Vice President Joe Biden at the inaugural balls of the 57th Presidential Inauguration. During a benefit concert for public school arts on April 14, 2013, Criss was made an honorary member of Yale University's a cappella singing group The Whiffenpoofs. Criss' first solo music tour visited 17 cities in the United States, Canada, and France from May 29 – June 30, 2013, and included songs from Glee, StarKid, his Human EP, and new material from his upcoming solo album.

=== 2016–present: Continued success ===
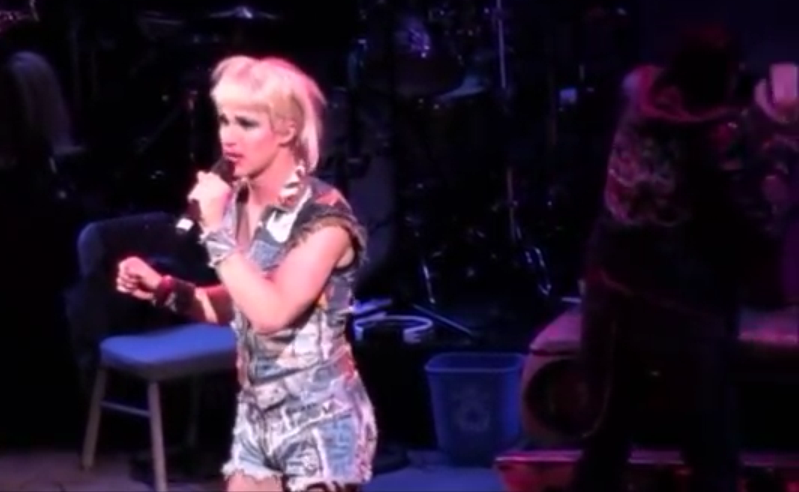
Criss during Hedwig and the Angry Inch

Criss took on the role of Hedwig in Hedwig and the Angry Inch from April 29, 2015, to July 19, 2015, at the Belasco Theater. He headlined the national tour in San Francisco and Los Angeles, from October 2 to November 27, 2016.

In 2017, Criss reunited with Glee creator Ryan Murphy to portray serial killer Andrew Cunanan in the second season of Murphy's anthology series American Crime Story. His performance received widespread acclaim from critics, and earned Criss the Primetime Emmy Award for Outstanding Lead Actor in a Limited Series or Movie and the Golden Globe Award for Best Actor – Miniseries or Television Film. Criss formed the indie pop band Computer Games with his brother, Chuck Criss the same year. Their first album, Lost Boys Life EP features four songs written by the duo. The lead single "Every Single Night" debuted at number two on Billboard's Hot Singles Sales chart. In December 2017, Criss released a five-track solo EP titled Homework. The EP debuted atop the Billboard Heatseekers Chart and at number seven on Billboard's Independent Albums chart.

Criss was an actor, executive producer, and creator for Royalties, a show on the streaming service Quibi. He worked with previous collaborators Matt and Nick Lang of Team StarKid, who co-wrote and produced the series. The show was released on June 1, 2020. On September 6, 2019, it was announced that Criss would be an actor and executive producer for Hollywood, released on Netflix on May 1, 2020. In October 2021, Criss portrayed The Caretaker in Muppets Haunted Mansion.

In March 2021, singer Brandy released the single "Starting Now", which Criss co-wrote. The song was featured in Disney Princess Remixed — An Ultimate Princess Celebration, a music special that will also feature other princesses, premiering August 2021 on the Disney Channel and Disney+. On October 8, 2021, Criss released his first Christmas-themed album through Decca Records. In December 2022, Criss went on a Christmas-themed tour across the U.S. with songs from the album. From April 14 to July 10, 2022, he performed in the Broadway revival of David Mamet's American Buffalo alongside Sam Rockwell and Laurence Fishburne. Criss has starred in the Broadway production of Maybe Happy Ending at the Belasco Theatre since November 2024. He exited the show for nine weeks starting in August 2025 and returned in November 2025. He is also a producer of the show.

=== Media appearances ===
Criss has appeared on the magazine covers of Billboard, Entertainment Weekly, Out, Playbill, TV Guide, Da Man, GT, Prestige, and Essential Homme. Criss is featured in the fall ad campaign (2011) for Uniqlo, a Japanese clothing line. Criss was named one of People's Sexiest Men Alive (2011), and was ranked No. 1 on AfterElton's "Hot 100" list (2011 & 2012), and No. 1 on GQ's "30 Under 30: The Most Stylish Young Men In Hollywood" list (2012).

=== Other projects ===
Criss is an investor and partner of The Motley, a California-based men's grooming e-tailer. Criss is a co-founder of Elsie Fest, a music festival which features Broadway and pop music acts. The first annual show was held on September 27, 2015, in New York City.

== Advocacy and charity work ==
Criss is an advocate for LGBTQ rights and is an active supporter of The Trevor Project, the leading national organization focused on suicide prevention efforts among lesbian, gay, bisexual, transgender, queer, and questioning (LGBTQ) youth. Criss is the recipient of Variety's Power of Youth Philanthropy award for his contributions to The Trevor Project.

Criss has been a spokesperson for various organizations, including Rock the Vote and the Foundation for New American Musicals.

Criss recorded the Bob Dylan song "New Morning", featuring his brother, Chuck Criss, for Amnesty International. It was part of the compilation album Chimes of Freedom: Songs of Bob Dylan Honoring 50 Years of Amnesty International, released on January 24, 2012.

Criss has performed at various charity benefits including American Conservatory Theater, AIDS Project Los Angeles, New Conservatory Theatre Center, Toys for Tots, City of Hope National Medical Center, Motion Picture & Television Fund, Public School Arts, MusiCares Foundation, The Old Vic, UCLA's Jonsson Comprehensive Cancer Center, Big Brothers Big Sisters of America, Young Storytellers Foundation, and the Elizabeth Glaser Pediatric AIDS Foundation.

== Personal life ==
In January 2018, Criss announced he was engaged to Mia Swier, his girlfriend of seven and a half years. They married on February 16, 2019. The couple's first child, a daughter (named Bluesy Belle Criss), was born on April 14, 2022. Their second child, a son (named Brother László Criss) was born on June 3, 2024.

== Filmography ==
=== Film ===
Year	Title	Role	Notes
2005	I Adora You	Josh	Short film
2009	Walker Phillips	Elliott	Short film
2010	The Chicago 8	Yippee Man	
2011	Glee: The 3D Concert Movie	Blaine Anderson	Concert documentary
2012	Girl Most Likely	Lee	
2013	The Wind Rises	Katayama	Voice (English dub)
2013	The Tale of the Princess Kaguya	Sutemaru	Voice (English dub)
2013	Six by Sondheim	Franklin Shepard	HBO documentary
2014	Stan Lee's Mighty 7	Micro	Voice
2015	Wrestling Isn't Wrestling	Theatre Audience Member	Short film
2017	Speech & Debate	Self	Cameo
2019	Batman vs. Teenage Mutant Ninja Turtles	Raphael	Voice; direct-to-video
2019	Midway	Commander Eugene E. Lindsey	
2020	Superman: Man of Tomorrow	Clark Kent / Superman	Voice; direct-to-video
2021	Justice Society: World War II	Clark Kent / Superman (Earth-1); Superman (Earth-Two)	Voice; direct-to-video
2023	Legion of Super-Heroes	Clark Kent / Superman	Voice; direct-to-video
2023	Justice League: Warworld	Clark Kent / Superman	Voice; direct-to-video
2024	Justice League: Crisis on Infinite Earths	Clark Kent / Superman (Earth-1); Superman (Earth-Two)	Voice; direct-to-video
2024	Babes	Doula as a Male	
2027	Hidden Heroes: A Descendants Story †	Jiminy Cricket	Filming
TBA	Cupid †		Filming

=== Television ===
Year	Title	Role	Notes
2009	Eastwick	Josh Burton	Recurring role, 5 episodes
2009	Little White Lie	Toby Phillips	11 episodes; also co-songwriter and musical producer
2010	Cold Case	Ruben Harris	Episode: "Free Love"
2010–15	Glee	Blaine Anderson	Recurring role (Season 2); 14 episodes Main role (seasons 3–6)
2011	Archer	Mikey and Tommy	Voice, episode: "Placebo Effect"
2011	Life of Leopold	Leopold Bonar	Voice
2011–12	The Glee Project	Himself	4 episodes
2012	Glee: Don't Stop Believing	Himself	Documentary on Glee
2012	The Cleveland Show	Hunter	Voice, episode: "Jesus Walks"
2013	Web Therapy	Augie Sayles	3 episodes
2013	2013 Teen Choice Awards	Co-host	Co-hosted with Lucy Hale
2014	Whose Line Is It Anyway?	Himself	Episode: "Darren Criss"
2015–17	Transformers: Robots in Disguise	Sideswipe	Voice
2015	American Horror Story: Hotel	Justin	Recurring role, 2 episodes
2016	Teenage Mutant Ninja Turtles: Turtles Take Time (and Space)	Raphael	Voice, short
2016	Transformers: Rescue Bots	Sideswipe	Voice, episode: "The Need for Speed"
2016	Hairspray Live!	Himself	Television special, NBC
2017	Supergirl	Music Meister	Episode: "Star-Crossed"
2017	The Flash	Music Meister	Episode: "Duet"
2018	The Assassination of Gianni Versace: American Crime Story	Andrew Cunanan	9 episodes
2020	Saturday Night Seder	Himself	Television special
2020	The Disney Family Singalong	Himself	Television special
2020	Hollywood	Raymond Ainsley	7 episodes; also executive producer
2020	Royalties	Pierce	10 episodes; also executive producer
2020	Wayward Guide for the Untrained Eye	Ryan Reynolds	Episode: "The Wolf at the Door"
2021	Trese	Marco	Voice, 4 episodes
2021	Rick and Morty	Bruce Chutback / Naruto	Voice, 2 episodes
2021	Muppets Haunted Mansion	The Caretaker	TV special
2021	Yasuke	Haruto	Voice, 6 episodes
2022	Green Eggs and Ham	Looka	Voice, 7 episodes
2023	The Marvelous Mrs. Maisel	Taylor	Episode: "The Testi-Roastial"
2023–24	Solar Opposites	Various	Voice, 2 episodes
2024–present	Hazbin Hotel	Saint Peter	Voice, 2 episodes
2024–25	Gabby's Dollhouse	Marty the Party Cat	Voice, 3 episodes
2024–present	Beastars	Melon	Voice, 8 episodes
2026	Finding Your Roots	Himself	Episode: America Ferrera and Darren Criss
2026	My Adventures with Superman	Jonathan Lane / Jon Kent / Superboy	Voice; 6 episodes

=== Theatre ===
Year	Title	Role	Venue	Notes	Ref.
1997	Fanny	Cesario	42nd Street Moon production	Stage debut	
1998	Do I Hear a Waltz?	Mauro	42nd Street Moon production		
1999	Babes in Arms	Beauregard Calhoun	42nd Street Moon production		
2005	Shed a Little Light: The Music of James Taylor	Singer and Musician	American Conservatory Theater		
2006	Paper Canoes	Salmon	Zeitgeist Artworks production		
2009	A Very Potter Musical	Harry Potter	StarKid Productions	Lead role, Co-songwriter and composer	
2009	Me and My Dick	Italian restaurant owner	StarKid Productions	Cameo (voice only); Co-songwriter and composer, guitarist	
2010	A Very Potter Sequel	Harry Potter	StarKid Productions	Lead role, Sole songwriter and composer Co-producer	
2012	How to Succeed in Business Without Really Trying	J. Pierrepont Finch	Al Hirschfeld Theatre	Broadway debut; Replacement for Daniel Radcliffe	
2012	A Very Potter Senior Year	Harry Potter	StarKid Productions	Lead role, Co-songwriter and composer	
2015	Hedwig and the Angry Inch	Hedwig Robinson	Belasco Theatre	Broadway; Replacement for John Cameron Mitchell	
2016	The Little Mermaid	Prince Eric	Hollywood Bowl	Concert	
2016	White Rabbit Red Rabbit	Performer	Westside Theatre	Off-Broadway	
2016	Hedwig and the Angry Inch	Hedwig Robinson	US National tour		
2022	American Buffalo	Bobby	Circle in the Square Theatre	Broadway revival	
2022	Chess	Freddie Trumper	Broadhurst Theatre	Broadway concert	
2024	Gutenberg! The Musical!	The Producer	James Earl Jones Theatre	Broadway; One night cameo	
2024	Little Shop of Horrors	Seymour Krelborn	Westside Theatre	Off-Broadway; Replacement for Corbin Bleu	
2024–2026	Maybe Happy Ending	Oliver	Belasco Theatre	Broadway; Original cast	

=== Video games ===
Year	Title	Role	Notes
2011	Dead or Alive: Dimensions	Jann Lee	Voice

=== Web ===
Year	Title	Role	Notes
2008	That Media Show	Presenter	3 episodes (No. 1, No. 2, No. 5); Series about Hollywood, filmmaking, and visual effects.
2012	Broadway.com Audience Choice Awards	Host	13th annual award.
2015	Tony Awards Red Carpet	Co-host	Co-hosted with Laura Osnes and Sierra Boggess
2016	Countdown to Hairspray Live!	Co-host	Co-hosted with Kristin Chenoweth and Martin Short

=== Musical performances ===
Year	Event	Location	Notes
2010–2013	Trevor Live	Los Angeles	Benefit for The Trevor Project. In 2010, Criss sang "Not Alone" and "Teenage Dream" with Glee's Dalton Academy Warblers and Katy Perry, in 2011, he sang Tom Jones' hit, "It's Not Unusual", in 2012 he sang an acoustic version of Katy Perry's "Part of Me", and in 2013, he co-sang lead, with the cast of Glee, the Charlie Chaplin song '"Smile".
2011	MusiCares Person of the Year	Los Angeles	Criss and Glee's Dalton Academy Warblers performed for Barbra Streisand, in honor of her being named MusiCares Person of the Year by the MusiCares Foundation.
2011	Glee Live! In Concert!	US, Canada, England & Ireland	The 16th most successful concert tour of 2011, grossing more than $40 million, with total attendance topping 485,000. All 40 dates sold out, including shows at Staples Center, Nassau Coliseum, and The O2 Arenas in London and Dublin.
2011	ASCAP Pop Music Awards	Los Angeles	Criss paid tribute to Rod Stewart by singing a ballad version of Stewart's song "Da Ya Think I'm Sexy?", while accompanying himself on piano.
2011	Billboard / Hollywood Reporter Film & TV Music Conference	Los Angeles	Criss honored composer Alan Menken with a medley of his own Disney songs, singing alongside Broadway star Lea Salonga.
2011	The SPACE Tour	New York & Boston	StarKid Productions' first national concert tour. Majority of songs performed were written and composed by Criss.
2011	Sing Out, Raise Hope, Benefit Concert	New York	Criss performed at Lincoln Center with the a cappella singing groups of Harvard University's Krokodiloes, Princeton University's Nassoons, and Yale University's The Whiffenpoofs, at a benefit concert for the Elizabeth Glaser Pediatric AIDS Foundation and The Trevor Project.
2012	E! Entertainment pre-Oscar Show	Los Angeles	Criss sang "The Rainbow Connection" with Kermit the Frog for the pre-show of the 84th Academy Awards.
2012	Apocalyptour	New York & Los Angeles	StarKid Productions' second national concert tour.
2012	Fundraiser for Barack Obama	Los Angeles	Criss performed for the President of the United States at an LGBT-sponsored campaign fundraising gala.
2013	57th Presidential Inauguration	Washington, D.C.	Kids' Inaugural Concert, hosted by First Lady Michelle Obama and Second Lady Jill Biden – Criss sang his own song "Not Alone", joined by the Soul Children of Chicago choir. He also accompanied Naya Rivera on guitar as she sang the hit "Valerie".; Vice President Joe Biden Inaugural event – Criss sang "Teenage Dream" and Carole King's "One Fine Day".; The Presidential Inaugural Ball – Criss performed the Disney song "When You Wish Upon a Star".
2013	Listen Up Tour	US, Canada & France	Criss headlined his first solo music tour, which visited 18 cities from May 29 – June 30. The set included songs from Glee, StarKid, his Human EP, and new material from his upcoming solo album.
2013	A Capitol Fourth	Washington, D.C.	Criss co-headlined the 4th of July celebration concert on the National Mall.
2014	Michael Feinstein's New Year's Eve at the Rainbow Room	New York	Criss co-sang with Michael Feinstein a medley of Frank Sinatra songs.
2016	Broadway Today with Darren Criss and Betsy Wolfe	Washington, D.C., New York & Toronto	Criss co-headlined with Betsy Wolfe a Broadway-themed concert tour, accompanied by the National Symphony Orchestra, conducted by Steven Reineke. Performances were held at The Kennedy Center, Carnegie Hall, and Roy Thomson Hall.
2016	The Little Mermaid in Concert	Los Angeles	Criss co-headlined the concert at the Hollywood Bowl, playing the part of "Prince Eric".
2026	Rodgers & Hart at Carnegie Hall	New York	
* Note: This is a selection of Criss' musical performances, not a complete list.

== Discography ==
Solo

- A Very Darren Crissmas (2021)

EPs

- Human (2010)
- Homework (2017)
- Masquerade (2021)

Glee albums

- Glee: The Music, The Christmas Album (2010)
- Glee: The Music, Volume 4 (2010)
- Glee: The Music, Volume 5 (2011)
- Glee: The Music Presents the Warblers (2011)
- Glee: The Music, Volume 6 (2011)
- Glee: The 3D Concert Movie (2011)
- Glee: The Music, The Christmas Album Volume 2 (2011)
- Glee: The Music, Volume 7 (2011)
- Glee: The Music, The Graduation Album (2012)
- Glee: The Music, Season 4, Volume 1 (2012)
- Glee: The Music, The Christmas Album Volume 3 (2012)
- Glee Sings the Beatles (2013)
- Glee: The Music – Celebrating 100 Episodes (2013)

StarKid Productions albums

- Little White Lie (2009)
- A Very Potter Musical (2009)
- Me and My Dick (A New Musical) (2010)
- A Very StarKid Album (2010)
- A Very Potter Sequel (2010)
- Starship (2011)
- The SPACE Tour (2012)
- Apocalyptour (2012)
- A Very StarKid Senior Year (2012)

Independent songs

- "Skin and Bones" – Duet with Charlene Kaye – Things I Will Need in the Past (album) (2008)
- "Dress and Tie" – Duet with Charlene Kaye (2011)
- "New Morning" – Chimes of Freedom: Songs of Bob Dylan Honoring 50 Years of Amnesty International (album) (2012)

Computer Games

- Lost Boys Life (2017)

Music videos

- "Skin and Bones" – Charlene Kaye (2009)
- "Magnolia Wine" – Charlene Kaye (2009)
- "Roll with Me" – Montgomery Gentry (2009)
- '"Dress and Tie" – Charlene Kaye (2011)
- "Last Friday Night (T.G.I.F.)" – Katy Perry (2011)
- "New Morning" – Amnesty International (2012)
- "Dress You Up" – Vogue's "Fashion Night Out" (2012)
- "Kangaroo Court" – Capital Cities (2013)
- "Songify the News 3" — The Gregory Brothers (2013)
- "I Sold My Bed, But Not My Stereo" – Capital Cities (2014)
- "Already Home" — A Great Big World (2014)
- "Anthem" — Phantom Planet featuring Darren Criss (2020)

== Tours and residencies ==
Headlining tours

- Listen Up! Tour (2013)

Co-headlining tours

- Glee Live! In Concert! (2011)
- LM/DC Tour (2018) (with Lea Michele)

Residencies

- A Very Darren Crissmas (2022)

== Awards and nominations ==
Year	Award	Category	Nominated work	Result	Ref.
2011	Variety	Power of Youth Philanthropy	The Trevor Project	Won	
2011	Dorian Awards	We're Wilde About You / Rising Star Award	Glee	Won	
2011	Teen Choice Awards	Choice TV: Breakout Star	Glee	Won	
2011	NewNowNext Awards	Brink of Fame: Actor	Glee	Won	
2011	BroadwayWorld – Chicago Awards	Best New Work/New Adaptation	Starship	Won	
2012	BroadwayWorld – Chicago Awards	Best Special Theatrical Event	A Very Potter Senior Year	Won	
2012	Broadway.com Award	Favorite Replacement	How to Succeed in Business Without Really Trying	Won	
2012	Screen Actors Guild Award	Outstanding Performance by an Ensemble in a Comedy Series	Glee	Nominated	
2013	Dorian Award	TV Musical Performance of the Year	Glee	Nominated	
2013	Screen Actors Guild Award	Outstanding Performance by an Ensemble in a Comedy Series	Glee	Nominated	
2013	Shorty Awards	Best Producers of Short Content on Social Media	Himself	Nominated	
2013	People's Choice Awards	Favorite Comedic TV Actor	Glee	Nominated	
2013	People's Choice Awards	Favorite TV Bromance (with Chord Overstreet)	Glee	Nominated	
2013	People's Choice Awards	Favorite On-Screen Chemistry (with Chris Colfer)	Glee	Nominated	
2015	Broadway.com Award	Favorite Replacement	Hedwig and the Angry Inch	Won	
2015	Primetime Emmy Awards	Outstanding Original Music and Lyrics	"This Time" – Glee	Nominated	
2015	Hollywood Music in Media Awards	Song – TV Show/Digital Series	"This Time" – Glee	Won	
2015	Giffoni Film Festival	Experience Award	Overall work	Won	
2017	Los Angeles Drama Critics Circle	Lead Performance	Hedwig and the Angry Inch	Nominated	
2018	MTV Movie & TV Awards	Best Performance in a Show	The Assassination of Gianni Versace: American Crime Story	Nominated	
2018	Primetime Emmy Awards	Outstanding Lead Actor in a Limited Series or Movie	The Assassination of Gianni Versace: American Crime Story	Won	
2018	TCA Awards	Individual Achievement in Drama	The Assassination of Gianni Versace: American Crime Story	Nominated	
2019	Golden Globe Awards	Best Actor – Miniseries or Television Film	The Assassination of Gianni Versace: American Crime Story	Won	
2019	Critics' Choice Awards	Best Actor in a Movie/Miniseries	The Assassination of Gianni Versace: American Crime Story	Won	
2019	Screen Actors Guild Awards	Outstanding Performance by a Male Actor in a Miniseries or Television Movie	The Assassination of Gianni Versace: American Crime Story	Won	
2025	Tony Awards	Best Musical	Maybe Happy Ending	Won (Note: As co-producer)	
2025	Tony Awards	Best Performance by a Leading Actor in a Musical	Maybe Happy Ending	Won	
2025	Drama League Awards	Distinguished Performance Award	Maybe Happy Ending	Nominated	
2025	Drama Desk Awards	Outstanding Lead Performance in a Musical	Maybe Happy Ending	Nominated	
2025	Outer Critics Circle Awards	Outstanding Lead Performer in a Broadway Musical	Maybe Happy Ending	Nominated	
2025	Broadway.com Award	Favorite Leading Actor in a Musical	Maybe Happy Ending	Won	
2025	Broadway.com Award	Favorite Onstage Pair (with Helen J. Shen)	Maybe Happy Ending	Nominated	
2025	Broadway.com Award	Favorite Onstage Pair (with HwaBoon)	Maybe Happy Ending	Nominated	
2025	Broadway.com Award	Favorite Performance of the Year (Musical)	Maybe Happy Ending	Nominated	
2026	Grammy Awards	Best Musical Theater Album	Maybe Happy Ending	Nominated	
