= Places (Lea Michele album) =

Studio album by Lea Michele
- Released: April 28, 2017
- Recorded: 2015–2016
- Studio: Harmony Studios
- Genre: Pop
- Length: 39:53
- Label: Columbia
- Producer: Xandy Barry; Andrew Hollander; Toby Gad; Jon Levine; Kyle Moorman; John Shanks; Jesse Shatkin

Lea Michele chronology
Louder (2014)	Places (2017)	Christmas in the City (2019)

Singles from Places
- 1. "Love Is Alive" Released: March 3, 2017

Professional ratings
Review scores
Source	Rating
AllMusic	2.5/5 stars

Places is the second studio album by American singer Lea Michele. It was released on April 28, 2017, by Columbia Records. The album was preceded by the lead single, "Love Is Alive".

Places received mixed reviews from critics, though Michele's vocal performance received a positive reception. In the United States, the album sold over 16,000 copies in its first week, debuting at number 28 on the Billboard 200 albums chart. In the United Kingdom, the album debuted at number 37 on the UK Albums Chart. In Canada, the album reached number 21 in its first week of release. As well as the first single "Love Is Alive", three promotional singles were also released in the lead up to the album. Songwriters who feature on the album include singers Ellie Goulding, Linda Perry, Allie X, and Alexandra Savior.

== Background ==
Recording for Michele's second studio album began in April 2015. Shortly into the recording process, Michele stated that the album would be less pop-influenced than her debut, and would "[go] back to [her] roots" with a more theatrical sound.

On January 11, 2017, Michele announced on social media that she would go on a mini tour in later that same month to promote her second album. She wrote, "My incredible fans have always been there for me. You inspire me. You've stood by me, cheered me on and lifted me up. When preparing for [this] upcoming album I wanted you all to know how important you are to me. These shows are a sneak peek into my upcoming album, as well as songs from Louder and maybe.. even a little Glee." An Intimate Evening with Lea Michele consisted of three shows in Los Angeles, New York and Santa Monica, which began on January 23 at the Hotel Café, and ended on January 30 at the Broad Stage. On January 26, 2017, while Michele was in the middle of her mini tour, it was announced the second album would be titled Places. The title references the showtime call of "places" when working in live theater.

== Singles ==
"Love Is Alive" was released as the album's lead single on March 3, 2017.

== Commercial performance ==
In the United States, the album debuted at number 28 on the Billboard 200 with over 16,000 copies sold in its first week.

== Track listing ==
Places – Standard edition
No.	Title	Writer(s)	Producer(s)	Length
1.	"Love Is Alive"	Chantal Kreviazuk; Nathan Chapman	Xandy Barry	3:37
2.	"Heavy Love"	Christopher Braide; Alexandra Hughes; Thomas Hull	Barry	3:40
3.	"Proud"	Ruth-Anne Cunningham; John Shanks	Shanks	3:00
4.	"Believer"	Fransisca Hall; Anjulie Persaud; Jesse Shatkin	Shatkin	3:56
5.	"Run to You"	Alexandra Tamposi; Stephen Wrabel; Nick van de Wall	Shanks	3:38
6.	"Heavenly"	Ellie Goulding; Richard Stannard; Ash Howes	Kyle Moorman	3:45
7.	"Anything's Possible"	Maureen McDonald; Tim Myers	Jon Levine	3:47
8.	"Getaway Car"	Dana Parish; Andrew Hollander; Tamposi	Hollander	3:30
9.	"Sentimental Memories"	Linda Perry; Alexandra McDermott	Shanks	4:30
10.	"Tornado"	Chloe Angelides; Michael Fitzpatrick; Hall	Toby Gad	3:23
11.	"Hey You"	Lea Michele; Tamposi; Wrabel	Shanks	3:07
Total length:				39:53

Places – Target and Japan bonus tracks
No.	Title	Writer(s)	Length
12.	"Truce"	Joleen Belle; Stephan Moccio; Julia Michaels	3:18
13.	"Letting Go"	Angelides; Michele; Tamposi; Molly Morgenstern; Olivier Geoffroy	3:13
Total length:			46:24

== Personnel ==
Adapted from AllMusic.

Performers

- Lea Michele – lead vocals, backing vocals
- Alexandra Tamposi – backing vocals
- John Shanks – backing vocals
- Kyle Moorman – backing vocals

Design and management

- Amanda Berman – A&R
- Alexandra Tamposi – A&R
- Shari Sutchliffe – production coordination, contracting
- Maria P. Marulanda – art direction, design
- Lea Michele – art direction, design
- Eric Ray Davidson – photographer

Technical

- John Shanks – keyboards, piano, electric guitar, bass, programming, engineering, producer
- Xandy Barry – keyboards, guitar, drums, orchestral arranging, mixing, programming, engineering, producer
- John Levine – keyboards, piano, bass, drum programming, engineering, producer
- Kyle Moorman – guitar, percussion, digital editing, programming, engineering, producer
- Jesse Shatkin – piano, bass, drums, synthesizer, programming, engineering, producer
- Andrew Hollander – piano, drums, Mellotron, engineering, mixing, producer
- Jamie Muhoberac – keyboards, piano, programming
- Toby Gad – instrumentation, arranging, producer
- Alexandra Tamposi – vocal producer, vocal percussion
- Suzy Shinn – vocal engineering
- Joe LaPorta – mastering
- Joe Zook – mixing
- Michael H. Brauer – mixing
- Manny Marroquin – mixing
- Chris Galland – mixing engineering
- Steve Vealey – mixing assistant
- Paul Lamalfa – engineering, digital editing
- Sam Dent – engineering
- Taylor Crommie – assistant engineering
- Seth Olansky – assistant engineering
- Chantal Kreviazuk – piano
- Linda Perry – piano
- Jon Sosin – guitar
- Aaron Sterling – drums
- Simon Huber – cello
- Robin Florentine – assistant
- Jeff Jackson – assistant

== Charts ==
Chart (2017)	Peak position
Australian Albums (ARIA)	25
Belgian Albums (Ultratop Flanders)	32
Belgian Albums (Ultratop Wallonia)	68
Canadian Albums (Billboard)	21
French Albums (SNEP)	148
Irish Albums (IRMA)	82
Italian Albums (FIMI)	34
New Zealand Heatseekers Albums (RMNZ)	2
Scottish Albums (OCC)	31
Swiss Albums (Schweizer Hitparade)	38
UK Albums (OCC)	37
US Billboard 200	28
