= Louder (Lea Michele album) =

Studio album by Lea Michele
- Released: February 28, 2014
- Recorded: 2010−2013
- Studios: Roc The Mic, Westlake Recording Studios, Henson Recording Studios, Pulse Recording Studios, EastWest Studios, Magical Thinking Studios
- Genres: Pop; EDM; power pop
- Length: 42:29
- Label: Columbia
- Producers: Josh Abraham; Benny Blanco; Chris Braide; Scott Cutler; David Hodges; Matt Rad; The Messengers; Monsters & Strangerz; Colin Munroe; Oliver "Oligee" Goldstein; Ali Payami; John Shanks; Sir Nolan; Stargate; Sean Walsh

Lea Michele chronology
Louder (2014)	Places (2017)

Singles from Louder
- 1. "Cannonball" Released: December 10, 2013; 2. "On My Way" Released: May 4, 2014

Louder is the debut studio album by American singer Lea Michele. It was released on February 28, 2014 by Columbia Records. The album was preceded by the release of the album's lead single, "Cannonball". Michele collaborated with many songwriters and producers on the album, including Stargate and The Monsters and the Strangerz, both of whom have previously worked with recording artists such as Rihanna and Demi Lovato. Musically, the album is set in the genres of pop, power pop and EDM. Lyrically, the album speaks of strength and empowerment, romantic relationships, and loss of love.

Louder received mixed reviews from critics, with many criticizing its material as outdated, and comparing it to albums by other pop singers like Katy Perry and Celine Dion. However, Michele's vocal performance received generally positive reception. In the United States, the album sold over 60,000 copies in its first week, debuting at number 4 on the Billboard 200 albums chart. In the United Kingdom, the album debuted at number 16 on the UK Albums Chart. In Canada, the album also reached the number 4 spot in its first week of release. As well as the first single "Cannonball", four promotional singles were also released in the lead up to the album. Songwriters who worked on the album include singers Sia and Christina Perri, and Academy Award-nominated lyricist Anne Preven.

== Background ==
"I set out to make a really pop-heavy album that was fun and empowering – I love Katy Perry and Kelly Clarkson! But then I found myself picking and writing these songs that were very emotional and dramatic. Louder has songs that express extreme love and some pain. I look at it and think, 'That was my year.' I didn't record any songs that I didn't completely relate to." – Michele in response to her musical direction

In September 2012, it was announced that Michele had signed a recording contract to release her debut studio album. Recording for the album began the following month, on October 19, 2012. Shortly into the recording process, Michele stated that it was going to be 'a pretty slow process' and that the musical direction she would take would be more 'pop/rock driven' rather than Broadway influenced, which is what her fans were most used to hearing. Michele collaborated with a number of big music figures, including producers The Monsters and the Strangerz, Stargate, Kuk Harrell, Colin Munroe, and Chris Braide. Michele completed vocal recordings in June 2013, and the album was set for release in late 2013, however, Michele's boyfriend died in July 2013, so the release date was pushed back to March 2014.

Notable songwriters on the album include Australian singer-songwriter Sia, American singer-songwriters Christina Perri and Bonnie McKee, and Academy Award-nominated songwriter Anne Preven. Furler penned four of the tracks that feature on the album, including "Cannonball" and "If You Say So", the latter of which was co-written with Michele. Most of the songs on the album are of the pop, dance-pop, and pop rock genres, mixed with some traditional pop ballads including "If You Say So" and "Battlefield". Before the release of the lead single "Cannonball", Michele stated, "I just felt that "Cannonball" was the perfect first song for people to hear from this record. It just really explains where I am right now and it's been such an inspirational song for me." The second single, "On My Way", was released on May 4, 2014.

== Influences ==
Michele has said that she had a number of musical influences on this album, including Katy Perry, Lady Gaga and Kelly Clarkson. Talking to Billboard about Louder, Michele said artists such as Lady Gaga, Taylor Swift and Miley Cyrus were also sources of inspiration. It was reported that Michele and her team consciously decided on "big, splashy, anthemic pop" theme for her debut, "a cross between Evanescence and Kelly Clarkson without a whiff of a show tune".

== Promotion ==
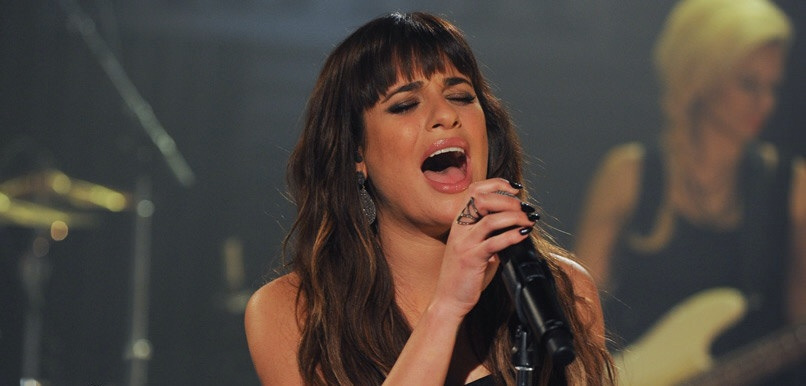
Michele performing songs from Louder at the Walmart Soundcheck in May 2014

The album's lead single, "Cannonball" was released in most countries around the world on December 10, 2013, and was released in the UK on March 9, 2014. The track list was released on December 8, 2013, by Michele on her Instagram and Twitter pages. "Empty Handed" was written by Christina Perri, and "If You Say So" was co-written by Michele and Australian singer-songwriter Sia. New York radio station WHTZ revealed via their Twitter page that Michele would be debuting the song on Elvis Duran and the Morning Show on December 10, 2013. Her first live performance of "Cannonball" was on The Ellen DeGeneres Show on December 12, 2013. Michele performed "Cannonball" live on The X Factor USA's season 3 finale on December 19, 2013.

On December 27, 2013, a second track from the album titled "Battlefield" (written by Furler and Larry Goldings) premiered on the Just Jared website. The song was then released as an instant download on iTunes on December 28, 2013. In Ireland, the song debuted at the number 55 spot. In France, it reached number 117. On January 13, 2014, the album's title song "Louder" (written by Preven, Jaden Michaels and Colin Munroe) premiered on Billboard's website exclusively a day before its official iTunes release on January 14, 2014. "Louder" reached number 111 in the US, 18 on the US Heatseekers Chart, number 64 on the Canadian Singles Chart, and reached 46 and 47 in France and Spain, respectively.

"What Is Love?" also premiered a day before its iTunes release on January 28, 2014. In Canada, "What Is Love?" charted at number 99. The song also reached number 45 on the Spanish Singles Chart, and debuted at number 55 in France. A fourth countdown song, "You're Mine", was released to iTunes on February 11, 2014. The song charted at number 112 on the US Billboard Hot 100, 83 on the Canadian Singles Chart, and 47 on the French Singles Chart. As well as this, the song also reached number 24 on the US Heatseekers Chart. Following the release of the album, Michele held CD signings in several cities in the US, including New York City, San Diego, Paramus, New Jersey, and Los Angeles. On March 19, 2014, Michele performed her second single "On My Way" on The Ellen DeGeneres Show after an interview with Ellen DeGeneres.

Michele performed "Cannonball", "Battlefield" and "You're Mine" from this album on her mini tour An Intimate Evening with Lea Michele, in support of her second studio album, Places.

== Composition ==
The single "Cannonball" was written by Sia. Originally, this song was not meant for Michele; it was introduced to her a month after her boyfriend's death and she had an instant connection with its lyrics because they encapsulated her feelings in that moment. Michele has stated, "I just felt that "Cannonball" was the perfect first song for people to hear from this record. It just really explains where I am right now and it's been such an inspirational song for me. The minute I heard the song, I had a physical reaction to it. For me, it's been my strength. I listen to it every day. I know it was brought into my life for a reason. It's really been so helpful for me and I hope it's the same for other people as it's been for me." Because of this, Sia gave the song to her. Sia also wrote the song "Battlefield" especially for Michele, and co-wrote "If You Say So" with her.

Talking about the title track "Louder", Michele has said, "It's a song that, no matter what, I can play in my car with the windows down. I feel like it shows off my voice as a singer, which is really important to me, because that’s what I do. I want to make sure that every song on my record is fun and enjoyable, but also, you hear my voice in them." Michele also stated, "I didn't want to find songs that I had to change myself for. I wanted to find songs that would only highlight my sound and were unique to me. I didn't want to fit any mold. I wanted it to be something that couldn't be replicated by anyone else. It was important to me that the album began with "Cannonball" and ended with "If You Say So". I have to acknowledge what I've been through this year. It was really difficult, which I think is represented in "If You Say So" and a song like "Cannonball" represents finding strength and hope. These are the two sides of my life right now. The grief, but also the search for strength and hope. I really wanted those two songs to bookend the album. Really let everyone know where I'm at."

== Singles ==
"Cannonball" was released as the album's lead single on December 10, 2013. Michele challenged her fans to unlock the cover art for the album by tweeting the hashtag: #LeaMicheleLouder. Once the cover art was unlocked, a short sound teaser of "Cannonball" was also released via Michele's website. "Cannonball" reached the 22 spot on Billboard's Digital Songs Chart, and debuted at number 75 on the Hot 100 in the United States, selling over 51,000 units in its first week through digital downloads alone. Michele made a number of television appearances to promote the track. She performed the song on The Ellen DeGeneres Show and The X Factor USA during the "Cannonball" release week.

"On My Way" was released as the album's second international single on May 4, 2014. "On My Way" had previously charted on the Canadian Singles Chart at number 85, and reached number 45 on the Singles Charts in both France and Spain. Michele performed the song on The Ellen DeGeneres Show on March 19, 2014, after revealing on her Twitter account that "On My Way" would be released as the album's second single.

== Critical reception ==
Professional ratings
Aggregate scores
Source	Rating
Metacritic	48/100
Review scores
Source	Rating
The A.V. Club	C−
AllMusic	2.5/5 stars
Billboard	3.5/5 stars
Entertainment Weekly	B−
Idolator	3.5/5
The National	4/5 stars
New York Daily News	2/5 stars
PopMatters	4/10
Rolling Stone	1.5/5 stars
USA Today	2.5/4 stars

The album received mixed reviews from music critics. According to review aggregator Metacritic, the album has a score of 48/100 based on 8 reviews, indicating "mixed or average reviews". On another aggregator website, Album of the Year, it holds the 4th position on a list of worst reviewed albums of 2014. Stephen Thomas Erlewine from AllMusic gave the album 2.5 stars out of 5 saying that "Michele is not a natural pop star. This was true in 2009 [when she debuted on Glee as Rachel Berry] and it's even clearer in 2014."

Mike Ayers from Billboard gave a mostly positive review, saying, "Lyrically, Louder is rather one-sided, as she often sings about the perils of relationships, over and over, in ways that we've all heard many times at this point. Still, it's a solid effort that shows she has promise as a bonafide pop artist." Sarah Rodman of The Boston Globe gave the album a mostly positive review, writing, "The Broadway veteran puts her mighty soprano through its paces on bouncy dance tracks, soaring ballads, and midtempo pop tunes where she straddles the line, mostly comfortably, between Katy Perry and Celine Dion." Kyle Anderson of Entertainment Weekly gave the album a B−, writing, "It's hard to be that mad at Louder, because it's so admirably and lovingly crafted. There's nothing wrong with Lea Michele's debut, and that's its biggest problem. While well curated and exquisitely executed, Louder is missing the visceral oomph that defines the gulf between superstars and the rest of the top 40 chum."

At USA Today, Jerry Shriver rated the album 2.5 stars out of four, and stated that "softer would have been a better approach." He added that the song "Battlefield" points to a more promising direction. Kevin McFarland of The A.V. Club gave a C− rating, writing, "Louder, Michele's debut solo album under her own name, does feature her distinctive talent as a vocalist. But the record is caught in an unfortunate stylistic limbo between fun-loving, youthful pop and the maturity of adult contemporary artists." Jim Farber of the New York Daily News awarded the album two stars. He criticized, "Michele doesn't so much sing as trumpet like an elephant eager for the charge. Her voice has more need than vulnerability, more anger than understanding." Christopher R. Weingarten of Rolling Stone also gave a negative review, stating, "This album of insta-dated EDM-pop anthems and half-cocked bass drops probably won't help [Michele's] cause. The songs about love's ups and downs have a few memorable lyrics ('My heart's too drunk to drive') but not nearly enough."

=== Accolades ===
Louder was nominated for World's Best Album at the 2014 World Music Awards, held in Monaco on May 27, 2014.

== Commercial performance ==
In the United States, the album debuted at number 4 on the Billboard 200 with 60,000 copies sold in its first week. As of January 2017, Louder had sold 110,000 copies in the United States alone.

== Track listing ==
Louder – Standard edition
No.	Title	Writer(s)	Producer(s)	Length
1.	"Cannonball"	Sia Furler; Tor Erik Hermansen; Mikkel Storleer Eriksen; Benjamin Levin	Stargate; Benny Blanco	3:35
2.	"On My Way"	Alexandra Tamposi; Marcus Lomax; Jordan Johnson; Stefan Johnson; Clarence Coffee; Fernando Garibay	Monsters & Strangerz; Kuk Harrell^{[a]}	3:45
3.	"Burn with You"	Chantal Kreviazuk; Nasri Atweh; Adam Messinger; Nolan Lambroza	The Messengers; Sir Nolan	3:38
4.	"Battlefield"	Furler; Larry Goldings	Josh Abraham; Oligee; Scott Cutler; Anne Preven^{[a]}	4:18
5.	"You're Mine"	Furler; Christopher Braide; Leslie Bricusse; John Barry	Braide; Harrell^{[a]}	3:38
6.	"Thousand Needles"	Furler; Tove Nilsson; Ali Payami	Payami; Harrell^{[a]}	3:24
7.	"Louder"	Furler; Colin Munroe; Jaden Michaels; Preven	Munroe; Sean Walsh; Preven^{[a]}	3:50
8.	"Cue the Rain"	Matt Radosevich; Felicia Barton; Preven; Lea Michele	Matt Rad; Preven^{[a]}	3:59
9.	"Don't Let Go"	Radosevich; Barton; Preven	Matt Rad; Preven^{[a]}; Cory Enemy^{[b]}	3:16
10.	"Empty Handed"	John Shanks; Christina Perri; David Hodges	Hodges; Shanks; Preven^{[a]}	4:51
11.	"If You Say So"	Furler; Braide; Michele	Braide; Preven^{[a]}	4:15
Total length:				42:29

Louder – Japanese version (bonus track)
No.	Title	Writer(s)	Producer(s)	Length
12.	"To Find You"	Bonnie McKee	Greg Wells; Preven^{[a]}	4:19
Total length:				46:48

Louder – Digital deluxe version (bonus tracks)
No.	Title	Writer(s)	Length
12.	"What Is Love?"	Brittany Scriven; John Lock	3:25
13.	"Gone Tonight"	Michele; Preven; Barton; CJ Baran; Drew Lawrence	3:33
14.	"The Bells"	Preven; Cutler	3:44
Total length:			53:11

Notes

- ^{^a} signifies a vocal producer
- ^{^b} signifies an additional producer

Sampling credit

- "You're Mine" contains portions of "You Only Live Twice", written by Leslie Bricusse and John Barry.

== Personnel ==
Adapted from AllMusic.

Creativity and management

- Dave Bett – creative director
- Andrew Luftman – production coordination
- Cindi Peters – production coordination
- Scott "Yarmov" Yarmovsky – production coordination
- Melanie Inglessis – make-up artist
- Maria Egan – A&R
- Gelareh Rouzbehani – A&R
- Anita Marisa Boriboon – art direction, design
- Peggy Sirota – photographer
- Mark Townsend – hair stylist

Performance

- Lea Michele – vocals, primary artist
- Felicia Barton – backing vocals
- Sia Furler – backing vocals
- Deanna Bombchica – backing vocals
- David Hodges – backing vocals
- Jaden Michaels – backing vocals
- Chantal Kreviazuk – backing vocals
- Chris Braide – backing vocals

Technical

- Anne Preven – producer, vocal producer
- Benny Blanco – instrumentation, programming, producer
- Colin Munroe – engineering, producer
- Nasri Atweh – vocal engineering, producer
- Larry Goldings – piano
- Kuk Harrell – vocal producer
- Delbert Bowers – mixing
- Emerson Day – engineering
- Josh Abraham – executive producer
- Oliver "Oligee" Goldstein – producer
- Tim Blacksmith – executive producer
- Danny D. – executive producer
- Scott Cutler – executive producer, producer
- Cory Enemy – producer
- Mikkel Storleer Eriksen – engineering, instrumentation, programming, producer
- David Hodges – piano, programming, producer
- John Shanks – engineering, guitar, programming, producer
- Sir Nolan – instrumentation, producer
- Jaycen Joshua – mixing
- Stefan Johnson – vocal editing
- Justin Hergett – mixing assistant
- Ryan Kaul – mixing assistant
- Paul Lamalfa – engineering
- Ali Payami – engineering, keyboards, programming, strings, producer
- Chris Braide – engineering, fairlight, bass guitar, electric guitar, keyboards, piano, programming, string arrangements, synthesizer, producer
- Matt Rad – bass, programming, engineering, guitar, keyboards, producer
- Manny Marroquin – mixing
- Tony Maserati – mixing
- Chris Galland – mixing assistant
- The Monsters and the Strangerz – producer
- Adam Messinger – instrumentation, vocal engineering, producer
- Oliver Kraus – string arrangements
- Vaughn Oliver – programming
- Daniela Rivera – mixing assistant
- Phil Tan – mixing
- Chris Gehringer – mastering
- Cory Nitta – drum programming, keyboards
- Chris Sclafani – engineering assistant
- Jaime Sickora – engineering
- Pat Thrall – engineering
- Sean Walsh – engineering, vocal engineering, producer
- Ryan Williams – engineering, vocal engineering

== Charts ==
Chart (2014)	Peak position
Australian Albums (ARIA)	4
Austrian Albums (Ö3 Austria)	25
Belgian Albums (Ultratop Flanders)	15
Belgian Albums (Ultratop Wallonia)	22
Canadian Albums (Billboard)	4
Danish Albums (Hitlisten)	17
Dutch Albums (Album Top 100)	15
Finnish Albums (Suomen virallinen lista)	37
French Albums (SNEP)	15
German Albums (Offizielle Top 100)	44
Irish Albums (IRMA)	11
Italian Albums (FIMI)	8
Japanese Albums (Oricon)	29
New Zealand Albums (RMNZ)	6
Norwegian Albums (VG-lista)	10
Scottish Albums (Official Charts)	13
Spanish Albums (Promusicae)	7
Swiss Albums (Schweizer Hitparade)	18
UK Albums (Official Charts)	16
US Billboard 200	4

== Release history ==
Country	Date	Edition	Format	Label	Ref
Germany	February 28, 2014	Deluxe	Digital download	Columbia	
Canada	March 4, 2014	Standard; deluxe	CD; digital download	Columbia	
United States	March 4, 2014	Standard; deluxe	CD; digital download	Columbia	
Brazil	March 4, 2014	Standard; deluxe	CD; digital download	Columbia	
Italy	March 4, 2014	Standard; deluxe	CD; digital download	Columbia	
Japan	March 17, 2014	Standard; deluxe	CD; digital download	Columbia	
United Kingdom	March 17, 2014	Standard	CD; digital download	Columbia	
