= Homework (EP) =

EP by Darren Criss
- Released: December 15, 2017
- Length: 18:11
- Label: Independent

Darren Criss chronology
Human (2010)	Homework (2017)	Masquerade (2021)

Singles from Homework
- 1. "I Dreamed a Dream" Released: December 15, 2017; 2. "I Don't Mind" Released: December 19, 2017

Homework is the second EP released by singer-songwriter Darren Criss. It was released on December 15, 2017. The EP reached No. 7 on Billboard's Independent Albums chart.

== Track listing ==
All tracks are written by Darren Criss, except where noted.

Homework track listing
No.	Title	Length
1.	"Foolish Thing"	4:01
2.	"I Dreamed a Dream" (writers: Herbert Kretzmer, Alain Boublil, Claude-Michel Schönberg)	2:52
3.	"Going Nowhere"	3:57
4.	"I Don't Mind"	2:33
5.	"The Day That the Dance Is Over" (writers: Chuck Criss, D. Criss)	4:48

== Charts ==
Chart performance for Homework
Chart (2010)	Peak position
US Heatseekers Albums (Billboard)	1
US Independent Albums (Billboard)	7
