= Human (Darren Criss EP) =

EP by Darren Criss
- Released: July 20, 2010
- Genre: Soul-folk
- Length: 19:53
- Label: Self-released
- Producer: Chris Lorentz

Darren Criss chronology
Human (2010)	Homework (2017)

Human is the debut EP released by singer-songwriter Darren Criss. Criss independently produced the EP and it was released digitally on July 20, 2010. The EP reached No. 17 on Billboard's Top Heatseekers chart. As of April 2013, the EP has sold 27,000 copies in the United States, according to Nielson SoundScan.

== Album information ==
=== Background ===
Criss describes that he put off making an EP for a long time because he is a perfectionist, which is why he prefers people to see him play live. Criss recorded the EP in his room in about a week with an audio engineer friend of his. Criss states that each of the songs are "old songs", adding that "Human" was the first song he wrote, back when he was 15. The songs "Sami" and "Not Alone" appeared in the StarKid Productions musical A Very Potter Musical, but Criss had written them beforehand. He wrote "Not Alone" while abroad in Italy and wrote "Sami" for the web series Little White Lie that he and other members of StarKid had done in 2007.

=== Sound ===
Criss finds his music tough to categorize into a certain genre, but stated that he liked the term "soul-folk".

== Track listing ==
All tracks are written by Darren Criss and produced by Chris Lorentz

Human track listing
No.	Title	Length
1.	"Human"	2:29
2.	"Sami"	3:48
3.	"Jealousy"	5:18
4.	"Don't You"	3:50
5.	"Not Alone"	4:28

== Personnel ==
- Darren Criss – vocals, guitar
- Chris Lorentz – producer, mixing, mastering
- Forest Casey – CD and cover photography
- Frank Franco III – CD and cover layout design

== Charts ==
Chart performance for Human
Chart (2010)	Peak position
US Heatseekers Albums (Billboard)	17
