= Cannonball (Lea Michele song) =

Single by Lea Michele

from the album Louder
- Released: December 10, 2013
- Recorded: 2013
- Genre: Pop
- Length: 3:35
- Label: Columbia
- Songwriters: Sia Furler; Benny Blanco; Mikkel Storleer Eriksen; Tor Erik Hermansen
- Producers: Stargate; Benny Blanco

Lea Michele singles chronology
"Cannonball" (2013)	"On My Way" (2014)

Music video
- "Cannonball" on YouTube

"Cannonball" is the debut single by American singer Lea Michele. The song was released onto iTunes on December 10, 2013 and made its radio debut on Elvis Duran and the Morning Show on December 16, 2013. The song was written by Sia, Benny Blanco, Mikkel Storleer Eriksen, Tor Erik Hermansen and Saud, and was produced by Stargate and Blanco.

"Cannonball" received mostly positive reviews from music critics, who praised Michele's vocal delivery. The song peaked at number 75 on the official Billboard singles chart in the United States and sold 51,000 digital copies in its first week of sale.

== Theme and composition ==
In an interview with MTV, Michele said that "Cannonball" was the song that helped her cope in the aftermath of her boyfriend and co-star Cory Monteith's death, in the summer of 2013. Initially, Michele did not plan on having the song be a part of the album, which she had finished recording in June; but after Monteith died aged 31 in July, Michele put her album on hold and took a moment to think if there was anything else she needed to get off her chest. Working with songwriters Sia and Benny Blanco, who co-wrote "Cannonball", she recorded the track and the single became her "mantra of survival."

== Live performances ==
Michele's first live performance of the song was on December 12, 2013 on The Ellen DeGeneres Show, marking her first time as a musical guest. She also performed "Cannonball" live on the season 3 finale of The X Factor USA on December 19, 2013, and on The Tonight Show Starring Jimmy Fallon on March 4, 2014, where again she made her debut as a musical guest.

== Critical reception ==
The song received positive reviews from music critics. Billboard wrote, "The song's booming pop chorus features a confident Michele, whose Broadway-bred voice is as on-point as you'd expect: "And now I will start living today, today, today. I closed the door / I got this new beginning, and I will fly, I'll fly like a cannonball."

Rolling Stone writer Ron Blistein gave Michele's "Cannonball" a favorable review, writing, "The track is instantly memorable, not surprising considering the number of top hit-makers behind it, including cowriters Sia Furler and Benny Blanco. Production comes courtesy of the Norwegian duo Stargate. Still, it's Michele's powerhouse vocals that take center stage on "Cannonball" as she deftly switches from her Broadway-trained belting and Glee-honed pop chops."

== Music video ==
Michele filmed parts of the music video for "Cannonball" on two separate occasions; on November 17, 2013 and December 16, 2013. The video premiered on VEVO and YouTube on January 9, 2014. The music video for the track was directed by Robert Hales and styled by Estee Stanley. The video has over 18 million views on YouTube.

== Formats and track listings ==
- CD single
1. "Cannonball" – 3:35
- Dave Audé remixes – EP
1. "Cannonball" (Dave Audé Club Remix) – 6:50
2. "Cannonball" (Dave Audé Radio) – 4:33
3. "Cannonball" (Dave Audé Mixshow) – 5:47
4. "Cannonball" (Dave Audé Club Instrumental) – 6:50
5. "Cannonball" (Dave Audé Dub) – 6:19
- DVD single
1. "Cannonball" (Music Video) – 3:48
2. "Cannonball" (Live in Studio) – 3:55

== Charts ==
Chart (2013–2014)	Peak position
Australia (ARIA)	45
Belgium (Ultratip Bubbling Under Flanders)	7
Belgium (Ultratip Bubbling Under Wallonia)	11
Canada (Canadian Hot 100)	49
France (SNEP)	48
Hungary (Stream Top 40)	3
Ireland (IRMA)	80
Italy (FIMI)	27
Japan (Japan Hot 100)	82
Spain (Promusicae)	32
UK Singles (Official Charts)	56
US Billboard Hot 100	75
US Digital Songs (Billboard)	22
US Dance Club Songs (Billboard)	18

== Release dates ==
Country	Date	Format	Label
United States	December 10, 2013	Digital download	Columbia
United Kingdom	March 9, 2014	Digital download	Columbia
