= 1st Indie Soap Awards =

- Date: 2010

Highlights
- Best Picture: Diary of a Single Mom
- Best Direction: Kai Soremekun; Chick
- Best Actor: Craig Frank, Compulsions
- Best Actress: Rachael Hip-Flores; Anyone But Me

== Awards ==
Winners are listed first and highlighted in boldface.

**Best Indie Soap**: **Diary of a Single Mom**; Anyone But Me; Buppies; Chick; Compulsions; High Rise; Lumina	**Best Directing**: **Kai Soremekun, Chick**; Tina Cesa Ward, Anyone But Me; Julian Breece, Buppies; Nathan Atkinson, Compulsions; Robert Townsend, Diary of a Single Mom; Charles Van Eman, High Rise; Jennifer Thym, Lumina
**Best Performance by a Lead Actor**: **Craig Frank (Mark, Compulsions)**; Walter Maxfield Jones (Michael, Anacostia); Ryan Clardy (Cane, Empire); Rob Pralgo (Marcus, High Rise); Sharif Atkins (Ralph, The New Twenties)	**Best Performance by a Lead Actress**: **Rachael Hip-Flores (Vivian, Anyone But Me)**; Tatyana Ali (Quinci, Buppies); Janna Bossier (Justine, Compulsions); Monica Calhoun (Ocean, Diary of a Single Mom); Kai Soremekun (Lisa, Chick); Erin Wiley (Morgan, The New Twenties)
**Best Performance by a Supporting Actor**: **Joshua Holland (Archibald, Anyone But Me)**; Ernest Waddell (Shaka, Buppies); Seth Caskey (Adam, Compulsions); Richard Roundtree (Lou, Diary of a Single Mom); Ray Campbell (Khalid, The New Twenties)	**Best Performance by a Supporting Actress**: **Taryn O'Neill (Sara, Compulsions)**; Nicole Pacent (Aster, Anyone But Me); AnneMarie Pazmino (Cassandra, Compulsions); Janice Lynde (Peggy, Diary of a Single Mom); Arlene A. McGruder (Rae Pearl, Kindred); Helen Bowman (Helen, On the Edge of Happiness)
**Best Performance by a Guest Actor**: **Billy Dee Williams (Bo, Diary of a Single Mom)**; Ashlee Holland (Bitsy, Buppies); Damien Wigfall (Truth, Buppies); Dale Tino (Sean, High Rise)	**Breakthrough Performance**: **Preston Davis (Eliot, Buppies)**; **Renée Olbert (Simone, Seeking Simone)**; Jessy Hodges (Sophie, Anyone But Me); Zach Callison (Ian, Diary of a Single Mom); Greg Corbett (Paul, High Rise)
**Best Performance in a Comedic Role**: **Chante Frierson (Kourtney, Buppies)**; Anthony Anderson (Sean, Anacostia); Anne Sayre (Tina, Gotham); Ashley Ledbetter (Heather, High Rise); Anne Marie Hall (Louise, On the Edge of Happiness); Hillary B. Smith (Guya, Venice)	**Best Ensemble**: **Anacostia**; Anyone But Me; Buppies; Diary of a Single Mom; The New Twenties
**Best Writing**: **Susan Miller & Tina Cesa Ward, Anyone But Me**; Julian Breece, Buppies; Bernie Su, Compulsions; Cheryl L. West, Diary of a Single Mom; Greg Turner & Brian Hewson, Empire; Charles Van Eman & Mike Stiles, High Rise; Jennifer Thym, Lumina	**Best Editing**: **Michael Darrow, Compulsions**; Shon Hedges, Buppies; Tina Cesa Ward, Anyone But Me; Ryan Parker, On the Edge of Happiness; James Schroeder, High Rise; Bettina Enigl, Lumina
**Best Use of Music**: **Venice**; Buppies; Compulsions; High Rise; Palisades Pool Party	**Best Sound Design**: **Compulsions**; Chick; Diary of a Single Mom; Lumina; Palisades Pool Party
**Fan's Choice Award**: **Venice**; Anacostia; As The Corn Grows; Anyone But Me; Buppies; Chick; Compulsions; Confessions; Diary of a Single Mom; Empire; Gotham; Habesha Life; High Rise; Kindred; Lumina; The New Twenties; On the Edge of Happiness; Palisades Pool Party; Seeking Simone; Table of Choices	**Best Storyline**: **Vivian adjusts to her new life, Anyone But Me**; Stephenson family drama, Anacostia; Eliot's love triangle, Buppies; Tameka's drug problem, Confessions; The mystery of Lumina, Lumina
**Fan's Choice Award**: **Venice**; Anacostia; As The Corn Grows; Anyone But Me; Buppies; Chick; Compulsions; Confessions; Diary of a Single Mom; Empire; Gotham; Habesha Life; High Rise; Kindred; Lumina; The New Twenties; On the Edge of Happiness; Palisades Pool Party; Seeking Simone; Table of Choices	**Best Indie Web Series (Comedy)**: **Then We Got Help!**; Family Dinner; Wed-Locked; Imaginary Bitches; Fantasy Over Reality; Workshop
**Fan's Choice Award**: **Venice**; Anacostia; As The Corn Grows; Anyone But Me; Buppies; Chick; Compulsions; Confessions; Diary of a Single Mom; Empire; Gotham; Habesha Life; High Rise; Kindred; Lumina; The New Twenties; On the Edge of Happiness; Palisades Pool Party; Seeking Simone; Table of Choices	Special Editor's Awards: Marketing/Publicity: **Venice**; Product Placement/Business Model : **High Rise**; Main Title Design/Opening Sequence: **Lumina**; Scene Transition: **Empire**; Future Hit: **Gotham**
