= Writers Guild of America Award for Best Short Form New Media =

- Awarded for: Outstanding Writing for a Short Form Series
- Country: United States
- Presented by: Writers Guild of America
- First award: 2011
- Currently held by: Three Busy Debras (2022)
- Website: http://www.wga.org/

The Writers Guild of America Award for Best Short Form New Media is an award presented by the Writers Guild of America to the writers of the best short form new media series of the season. It has been awarded since the 63rd Annual Writers Guild of America Awards in 2011. The year indicates when each season aired.

Starting in 2023, the separate "Short Form New Media – Original" and "Short Form New Media – Adapted" categories were merged into one combined category.

== Winners and nominees ==
indicates the winner

=== 2010s ===
Year	Program	Episode(s)	Nominee(s)	Platform
2010 (63rd)
2010 (63rd)	Outstanding Achievement in Writing Original New Media			
2010 (63rd)	Anyone But Me	"The Real Thing," "Identity Crisis," "Girl Talk," "Naming Things," "Curtain Up"	Susan Miller, Tina Cesa Ward	AnyoneButMeSeries.com
2010 (63rd)	All’s Faire	"Episode 1," "Episode 4," "Episode 5," "Episode 6," "Episode 7"	Thom Woodley & Bob McClure & Matt Yeager	Allsfaire.tv
2010 (63rd)	Concierge: The Series	"We’ve Got Flash," "Complimentary Sandwiches," "Perfect Resume Builder"	Timothy Cooper	ConciergeTheSeries.com
2010 (63rd)	Madison Avery	"Zac"	Gregory Storm	stormfactory.com
2010 (63rd)	Outstanding Achievement in Writing Derivative New Media			
2010 (63rd)	30 Rock: Frank vs. Lutz	"Strip Pong," "Tear Jerks," "Brainstorm"	Jon Haller	nbc.com
2010 (63rd)	The 3rd Floor: The Office Webisodes	"Moving On," "Lights, Camera, Action!," "The Final Product"	Kelly Hannon, Jonathan Hughes, Mary Wall	nbc.com
2011 (64th)
2011 (64th)	Outstanding Achievement in Writing Original New Media			
2011 (64th)	Aim High	"Episode 1," "Episode 2," "Episode 4," "Episode 5," "Episode 6"	Heath Corson & Richie Keen	cambio.com/aim-high
2011 (64th)	Downsized	"Episode Employment," "Clientele," "Personal Property," "The American Dream," "Debt Ceiling"	Daryn Strauss	downsizedthewebseries.com
2011 (64th)	Jack in a Box	"The Return," "The Testosterone," "The Advice," "The Date"	Michael Cyril Creighton	jackinaboxsite.com
2011 (64th)	Outstanding Achievement in Writing Derivative New Media			
2011 (64th)	The Walking Dead: Torn Apart	"A New Day," "Family Matters," "Neighborly Advice," "Step Mom," "Everything Dies"	Story by : John Esposito & Greg Nicotero; Teleplay by : John Esposito	amc.com
2011 (64th)	30 Rock: Jack Donaghy, Executive Superhero	"Soft Served!," "Iced!," "Rokered!"	Tom Ceraulo	nbc.com
2011 (64th)	Mortal Kombat: Legacy	"Raiden," "Kitana and Mileena," "Johnny Cage"	Todd Helbing & Aaron Helbing	machinima.com
2011 (64th)	Sons of Anarchy: Appisodes	"Pay Phone," "Jax Meets His Second Son," "Tara & Piney," "Mexican Basketball"	Kurt Sutter & Gladys Rodriguez	FXnetworks.com
2012 (65th)
2012 (65th)	Outstanding Achievement in Writing Original New Media			
2012 (65th)	Jack in a Box	"The Compromises," "The Pest," The Snake," "The Bonding," "The Future"	Michael Cyril Creighton	jackinaboxsite.com
2012 (65th)	Lauren	"The Report," "The Third Man," "The Suck"	Jay Rodan	YouTube.com/wigs
2012 (65th)	Model Wife	"Assistants," "Photo Shoot," "Ten Per Cent," "Hashtags," "The Contract"	Cory Cavin, Bill G. Grandberg & Josh Lay	modelwifeshow.com
2012 (65th)	The Untitled Webseries that Morgan Evans Is Doing	"Babyshower," "Stendhal Syndrome," "A Very Important Call," "Think," "Emma"	Morgan Evans	UntitledWebseries.com
2012 (65th)	Outstanding Achievement in Writing Derivative New Media			
2012 (65th)	The Walking Dead: Cold Storage	"Hide And Seek," "Keys to the Kingdom," "The Chosen Ones," "Parting Shots"	John Esposito	amctv.com
2012 (65th)	Dexter Early Cuts: All in the Family	"Chapter 1," "Chapter 2," "Chapter 3," "Chapter 4," "Chapter 5"	Scott Reynolds	SHO.com
2013 (66th)
2013 (66th)	Short Form New Media – Original			
2013 (66th)	Sylvia Plath: Girl Detective	"The Collected Sylvia"	Mike Simses	sylviaplathgirldetective.com
2013 (66th)	Lauren	"Episode 8"	Jay Rodan	YouTube.com/wigs
2013 (66th)	Husbands	"I Do Over, Part 1"	Bradley C. Bell & Jane Espenson	CW Seed
2013 (66th)	Husbands	"I Do Over, Part 2"	Bradley C. Bell & Jane Espenson	CW Seed
2013 (66th)	Short Form New Media – Adapted			
2013 (66th)	Not awarded			
2014 (67th)
2014 (67th)	Short Form New Media – Original			
2014 (67th)	High Maintenance	"Rachel"	Katja Blichfeld & Ben Sinclair	helpingyoumaintain.com
2014 (67th)	Bad Shorts	"Apocalypse No"	Ben Zelevansky	luckybirdsmedia.com
2014 (67th)	Caper	"City of Angles"	Amy Berg & Mike Sizemore	Hulu
2014 (67th)	F to 7th	"Episode 1 – Nurture"	Ingrid Jungermann	YouTube.com
2014 (67th)	Vicky and Lysander	"Episode 204"	Damon Cardasis and Shannon Walker	YouTube.com
2014 (67th)	Vicky and Lysander	"Episode 207"	Damon Cardasis and Shannon Walker	YouTube.com
2014 (67th)	Short Form New Media – Adapted			
2014 (67th)	Not awarded			
2015 (68th)
2015 (68th)	Short Form New Media – Original			
2015 (68th)	Weight	"Back to Reality"	Daryn Strauss	weighttheseries.com
2015 (68th)	Anyone But Me	"Born This Way"	Susan Miller	Hulu
2015 (68th)	Short Form New Media – Adapted			
2015 (68th)	Heroes Reborn: Dark Matters	"Phoebe"	Zach Craley	nbc.com
2015 (68th)	Fear the Walking Dead: Flight 462	"Part 8"	L. Signorino & Mike Zunic	amc.com
2015 (68th)	Aquarius: Webisodes	"The Summer of Love, Part 1: Meet Charlie"	Mike Moore & David Reed	nbc.com
2016 (69th)
2016 (69th)	Short Form New Media – Original			
2016 (69th)	The Commute	"The Party"	Linsey Stewart & Dane Clark	YouTube.com
2016 (69th)	Now We're Talking	"Episode 101"	Tug Coker, Tommy Dewey	go90
2016 (69th)	Life Ends at 30	"Escape the Room"	Michael Field	vimeo.com
2016 (69th)	Thug Passion	"Itsy Bitsy Spider"	Motrya Tomycz	vimeo.com
2016 (69th)	Short Form New Media – Adapted			
2016 (69th)	Fear the Walking Dead: Passage	"Part 4"	Lauren Signorino & Mike Zunic	amc.com
2016 (69th)	The Strain	"Under Siege"	Bradley Thompson & David Weddle	fxnetworks.com
2017 (70th)
2017 (70th)	Short Form New Media – Original			
2017 (70th)	Not awarded			
2017 (70th)	Short Form New Media – Adapted			
2017 (70th)	Zac & Mia	"Starboy"	Allen Clary and Andrew Rothschild	go90
2017 (70th)	The Walking Dead: Red Machete	"Chapter 2"	Nick Bernardone	amc.com
2017 (70th)	Agents of S.H.I.E.L.D.: Slingshot	"John Hancock"	James C. Oliver & Sharla Oliver	abc.go.com
2017 (70th)	Agents of S.H.I.E.L.D.: Slingshot	"Justicia"	Mark Leitner	abc.go.com
2018 (71st)
2018 (71st)	Short Form New Media – Original			
2018 (71st)	Class of Lies	—	Tessa Leigh Williams	Snapchat
2018 (71st)	After Forever	—	Michael Slade & Kevin Spirtas	vimeo.com
2018 (71st)	Love Daily	—	Lauren Ciaravalli, Andrew Eisen, Aaron Eisenberg, Will Eisenberg, Alexis Jacknow, Nathaniel Katzman, Yulin Kuang, Nathan Larkin-Connolly, Alexis Roblan, Bennet D. Silverman, Ryan Wood	go90
2018 (71st)	West 40s	—	Mark Sam Rosenthal & Brian Sloan	West40s.com
2018 (71st)	Short Form New Media – Adapted			
2018 (71st)	The Walking Dead: Red Machete	—	Nick Bernardone	amc.com
2019 (72nd)
2019 (72nd)	Short Form New Media – Original			
2019 (72nd)	Special	—	Ryan O'Connell	Netflix
2019 (72nd)	After Forever	—	Michael Slade & Kevin Spirtas	Amazon Prime Video
2019 (72nd)	Short Form New Media – Adapted			
2019 (72nd)	Not awarded			

=== 2020s ===
Year	Program	Writer(s)	Platform
2020 (73rd)
2020 (73rd)	Short Form New Media – Original & Adapted		
2020 (73rd)	#freerayshawn	Marc Maurino	Quibi
2020 (73rd)	Better Call Saul Employee Training: Legal Ethics with Kim Wexler	Ariel Levine	AMC Digital on YouTube
2020 (73rd)	Most Dangerous Game	Story by : Josh Harmon and Scott Elder; Teleplay by : Nick Santora	Quibi
2021 (74th)
2021 (74th)	Short Form New Media – Original		
2021 (74th)	Not awarded		
2021 (74th)	Short Form New Media – Adapted		
2021 (74th)	Debunking Borat	Robyn Adams, Paul Hogan, Jack Youngelson	Amazon Prime Video
2021 (74th)	Calls	Fede Álvarez, Nick Cuse, Aidan Fitzgerald, Noah Gardner, Rodo Sayagues	Apple TV+
2021 (74th)	The Expanse: One Ship	Wes Chatham, Julianna Damewood, Glenton Richards	Amazon Prime Video
2022 (75th)
2022 (75th)	Three Busy Debras	Sandy Honig, Mitra Jouhari, Sarah Sherman, Alyssa Stonoha, Diana Tay and Evan Waite	Adult Swim
2022 (75th)	Breakwater	Zach Craley	Snapchat
2022 (75th)	Carpool Karaoke: The Series	Head Writer: David Young; Writer: Casey Stewart	Apple TV+
