= Laura Spencer (actress) =

American actress

- Born: May 8, 1986 (age 40); Oklahoma City, Oklahoma, U.S.
- Education: University of Oklahoma
- Occupation: Actress
- Years active: 2009–present
- Spouse: Michael Jack Greenwald (m. 2019)

Laura Spencer (born May 8, 1986) is an American actress. She is known for playing Jane Bennet in the 2012 web series The Lizzie Bennet Diaries (an adaptation of Pride and Prejudice), intern Jessica Warren in seasons 9 to 12 of Bones and Emily Sweeney in seasons 7 to 10 of the CBS comedy series The Big Bang Theory. She had a guest role on fellow Oklahoman Sterlin Harjo's FX on Hulu's TV series Reservation Dogs.

== Early life ==
Spencer was born on May 8, 1986, in Oklahoma City, Oklahoma, and grew up in Edmond where she attended Santa Fe High School, graduating in 2004. She went on to the University of Oklahoma, and earned a Bachelor of Fine Arts degree in 2008.

== Career ==
Spencer played Jane Bennet in the web series The Lizzie Bennet Diaries. She had a main role as Emily Sweeney, Raj Koothrappali's girlfriend on The Big Bang Theory, which began in that show's seventh season, in the March 6, 2014, episode "The Friendship Turbulence". That same year, she began a recurring role as Jessica Warren on Bones.

== Personal life ==
Spencer married Michael Jack Greenwald on January 5, 2019 in Los Angeles, California.

== Filmography ==
=== Film ===
Year	Title	Role	Notes
2009	Barking Water	Wendy	
2009	The Familiar	Laura	
2009	OU, I Love You	Jamie – Adams Hall	
2009	Nabot	Laura	Short
2010	The Rounder Comes to Town	The Young Lady	Short
2010	Pearl	Waitress Joyce	
2010	PSA: An Important Message From Women EVERYWHERE	Woman	Short
2010	In The Land of Fireworks	Heidi	
2010	Dylan Dog: Dead of Night	Zoe	
2011	Time Expired	Brenda	
2011	Mangus!	Kimmy Jones	
2011	A Christmas Kiss	Caroline	
2012	Well Enough Alone	The Girl	Short
2012	B Positive	Acting Class Student	Short
2012	The Millionaire Tour	Becky	
2012	My Funny Valentine	Lauren	
2013	My Precious Cargo	Mandy	Video short
2013	Avarice	Tammy	
2013	Silver Bells	Kasey Dalt	
2017	Heartland	Carrie	
2021	13 Minutes	Vicky	

=== Television ===
Year	Title	Role	Notes
2009	Funnell of Darkness	Record Store Girl 2	1 episode
2011	Mad Love	Alexa	Episode: "Fireworks"
2011	Criminal Minds: Suspect Behaviour	Sophia	Episode: "The Girl in the Blue Mask"
2011	Talent: The Casting Call	Backstage Assistant	1 episode
2011	2 Broke Girls	Jewelry Counter Girl	Episode: "And the Pop-Up Sale"
2011	Redesigning Your Life With Lainey Chase	Sophie	TV movie
2011	A Christmas Kiss	Caroline	TV movie
2012	Animal Practice	Sarah	1 episode
2012	Jessie	Cassandra Chesterfield	Episode: "101 Lizards"
2013	Switched at Birth	Parker Robinson	3 episodes
2014–2017	The Big Bang Theory	Emily Sweeney	Recurring role (season 7–8), 11 episodes; Main role (season 9), 5 episodes; Guest role (season 10), episode: "The Emotion Detection Automation"
2014–2017	Bones	Jessica Warren	Recurring role (season 9–12)
2014	Sleepy Hollow	Caroline	Episodes: "Bad Blood", "The Weeping Lady"
2021	Reservation Dogs	Ms. Rothrock	Episode: "F*ckin' Rez Dogs"
2024	Grey's Anatomy	Lacey	Episode: "If Walls Could Talk"
2025	Night Court	Lucy	Episode: "Hot to Trot"

=== Web series ===
Year	Title	Role	Notes
2012–13	The Lizzie Bennet Diaries	Jane Bennet	34 episodes
2012–13	(Character)	Hollis M. Daly	22 episodes
2012	Jan	Vanessa	9 episodes
2012	Vanessa & Jan	Vanessa	6 episodes
2012	The Lydia Bennet!!	Jane Bennet	6 episodes
2013	Coffee Shop Squatters	Julie	6 episodes
2014	Blue	Vanessa	Episodes: "Call Me Francine", "Make Me Feel Good"
2016	Edgar Allan Poe's Murder Mystery Dinner Party	Jane Austen	Episode: "The Tell-Tale Heart"
