= Christine Weatherup =

American actress, writer, and director (b. 1983)

- Born: September 8, 1983 (age 42); Los Angeles, California
- Education: University of Southern California
- Occupation: actor
- Years active: 1995–present
- Known for: Bread and Butter (2014) and Squaresville
- Spouse: Matt Enlow (m. 2007)

Christine Weatherup (born September 8, 1983) is an American actress, writer, and director. She is best known for her portrayal of Amelia Karinsky in Bread and Butter opposite Bobby Moynihan, Lauren Lapkus, and Micah Hauptman. Other notable appearances include Westworld, Mad Men, Criminal Minds, Grey's Anatomy and the IAWTV award-winning web series Squaresville, on which she also served as Executive Producer.

== Early life and education ==
Weatherup began acting at an early age, performing in school plays and magic shows before beginning to act professionally as a young adult. Early credits include a recurring role on ABC's soap opera General Hospital and a supporting role in the Trimark Pictures film Star Kid.

Weatherup attended The Buckley School and then Marlborough School in Los Angeles, where she was Student Body Performing Arts rep and co-captain of the Speech and Debate Team.

While attending the University of Southern California, she met her future husband, writer/director Matt Enlow. Weatherup was involved with the student television station, Trojan Vision, and was selected to participate in the senior acting showcase.

The summer before her senior year, she studied in Oxford, England at the British American Drama Academy.

Weatherup graduated from USC with a triple major in Cinematic Arts, Theater & Political Science and was named Magna Cum Laude.

== Career ==
In 2013, Weatherup, along with co-stars Mary Kate Wiles, Kylie Sparks, Tiffany Ariany, Austin Rogers, and David Ryan Speer, won the award for Best Ensemble Cast for Squaresville.

In 2015, Weatherup took home the award for Best Actress at the Naperville Independent Film Festival for her portrayal of Amelia Karinsky in Bread and Butter.

In 2017, Weatherup made her writing and directorial debut with Killed in Action, which won Best Screenplay and Best Short Drama at the Breckenridge Film Festival.
