= IAWTV Awards =

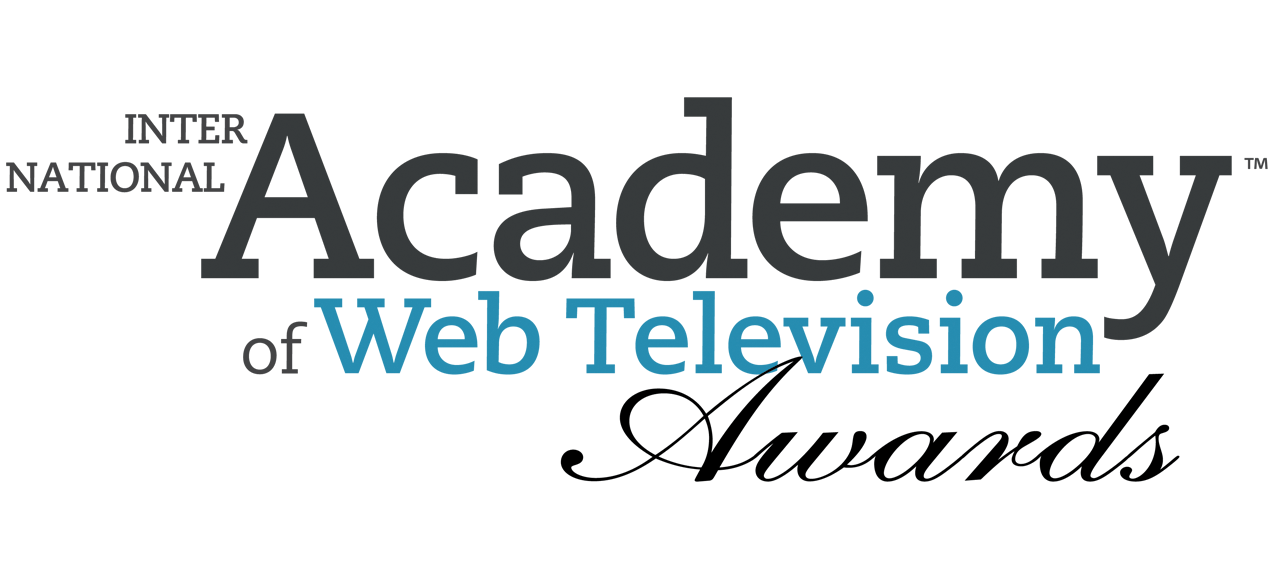
- Awarded for: Web television
- Country: United States
- Presented by: International Academy of Web Television
- First award: January 12, 2012
- Website: www.iawtvawards.com

The IAWTV Awards is an annual event hosted by the International Academy of Web Television, currently based in Los Angeles, that honors "short form digital series" creators and talent in more than two dozen categories.

== History ==
The IAWTV Awards are hosted annually (with some exceptions) by the International Academy of Web Television (IAWTV), which was founded in 2008 and is devoted to the advancement of the arts and sciences of web television production.

=== Inception ===
In 2010, before the IAWTV Awards existed, the IAWTV hosted the 2nd annual Streamy Awards. The poor reception of the event, and the surrounding controversy, resulted in a two-year hiatus for the Streamy Awards, and the subsequent creation of the IAWTV Awards. The two awards ceremonies are both still running, though as completely separate entities.

=== 2011–present ===
Since its inception in 2011, the IAWTV has held award ceremonies annually (with the exception of 2016, 2019 and 2020), presenting awards to web series creators and talent in more than two dozen categories, covering multiple genres. Notable IAWTV winners include Felicia Day, Julia Stiles and Milo Ventimiglia, as well as the critically acclaimed web series The Guild, Blue, Anyone But Me, Husbands, Leap Year, and Whatever, Linda.

Between 2012 and 2015, the IAWTV Awards were held in Las Vegas. After a hiatus in 2016, the 2017 and 2018 ceremonies took place in Los Angeles. A further hiatus in 2019 and 2020 (with the hiatus in 2020 attributed to the global pandemic) will end with a planned virtual ceremony for the 2021 IAWTV Awards.

== Awards ceremonies ==
For the full list of winners from each ceremony, visit the official IAWTV website for archives.

Ceremony	Date	Time	Best Web Series	Best Director	Best Female Performance	Best Male Performance
1st annual IAWTV Awards	January 12, 2012	8:00 p.m.	The Guild (Comedy); RCVR (Drama)	Sean Becker – The Guild (Comedy); Chris Preksta – The Mercury Men (Drama)	Felicia Day – The Guild (Comedy); Rachael Hip-Flores – Anyone But Me (Drama)	Jeff Lewis – The Jeff Lewis 5-Minute Comedy Hour (Comedy); Daniel Bonjour – RCVR (Drama)
2nd annual IAWTV Awards	January 8, 2013	8:00 p.m.	Squaresville (Comedy); Leap Year (Drama)	Sean Becker – My Gimpy Life (Comedy); Tina Cesa Ward – Anyone But Me (Drama)	Teal Sherer Teal – My Gimpy Life (Comedy); Julia Stiles – Blue (Drama)	Jeff Lewis – The Jeff Lewis 5-Minute Comedy Hour (Comedy); Xander Berkeley – The Booth at the End (Drama)
3rd annual IAWTV Awards	January 7, 2014	8:00 p.m.	Husbands (Comedy); Battlestar Galactica: Blood & Chrome (Drama)	Scott Brown – Destroy the Alpha Gammas (Comedy); Rodrigo Garcia – Blue (Drama)	Hannah Spear – Versus Valerie (Comedy); Julia Stiles – Blue (Drama)	Brad Bell – Husbands (Comedy); Milo Ventimiglia – Chosen (Drama)
4th annual IAWTV Awards	April 15, 2015	8:00 p.m.	TIE: Honest Trailers & Real Housewives of Horror (Comedy); Whatever, Linda (Drama)	Sean Becker – Hench (Comedy); Matt Eastman – Whatever, Linda (Drama)	Zoe Chao – God Particles (Comedy); Lindsey Middleton – Vanessa’s Story (Drama)	Matthew Werkmeister – Chris & Josh (Comedy); Shaun Blaney – The Web Series (Drama)
5th annual IAWTV Awards	October 4, 2017	8:00 p.m.	Bruce (Comedy); Jade of Death (Drama)	Tony Rogers – Bruce (Comedy); TIE: Erin Good – Jade of Death & Luke Eve – High Life (Drama)	Rachel Reyes – Say Hello (Comedy); Odessa Young – High Life (Drama)	Chase Anthony – A Whole New Irving (Comedy); Ryan Hellquist – L.A. Macabre (Drama)
6th annual IAWTV Awards	August 24, 2018	8:00 p.m.	Dinner with Don (Comedy); Giants (Drama)	Corrie Chen – Homecoming Queens (Comedy); TIE: Carey Williams – Giants & Laurent King – Ink (Drama)	Meghan Heffner – How to Buy a Baby (Comedy); Cady Huffman – After Forever (Drama)	Christopher Graham – Whatta Lark (Comedy); Yohan Genin – Nemausus (Drama)

== See also ==
- Webby Awards
