= WIGS (web channel) =

US media channel about women's lives

- Genre: Scripted and Unscripted Web Series
- Founded: May 14, 2012
- Founders: Jon Avnet and Rodrigo Garcia
- Headquarters: Culver City, California
- Key people: Julia Stiles; Troian Bellisario; Jennifer Beals; Kim Shaw; Sarah Jones; America Ferrera; Mary Elizabeth Ellis; Melonie Diaz; Laura Spencer; Caitlin Gerard; Maura Tierney; Rosanna Arquette; Catherine O'Hara; Jena Malone
- Website: http://www.watchwigs.com

WIGS is a web channel, part of the YouTube Original Channel Initiative. It presents web series, short films and documentaries about the lives of women. WIGS targets a female audience. Most videos are around five to ten minutes in length.

The channel was co-created by Jon Avnet, producer of Black Swan and Risky Business, and Rodrigo Garcia, who directed Albert Nobbs and In Treatment.

== History ==
Jon Avnet and Rodrigo Garcia developed and wrote a handful of series and recruited writers and directors such as Lesli Linka Glatter, Rose Troche, Amy Lippman, Marta Kauffman, and Julia Stiles, to direct projects for the channel. They have recruited actors such as Jennifer Beals, Jena Malone, Troian Bellisario, and Julia Stiles.

WIGS officially launched on May 14, 2012. The channel's first season includes 100 episodes of short films, series and documentaries. "Jan," written and directed by Jon Avnet, was the first series released by WIGS. While the channel's tagline "Where it gets interesting" does not fully match the acronym WIGS; on their website, the words "Where It Gets . . ." are used to begin to describe each series, and the last word is changed. For example, for the first series, "Jan," the tagline is, "Where It Gets Spicy."

On February 19, 2013, Fox announced the launch of an event series and multiplatform programming department and a multiyear partnership with WIGS. The multiyear programming, marketing and distribution pact with WIGS was intended to serve as an incubator for original content that can be programmed on Fox or other networks. WIGS fell under Fox's Shana C. Waterman's purview.

In May 2013, WIGS celebrated its first anniversary and combined viewing figures of over 33 million. The channel was at that point YouTube's number one channel for scripted drama.

Beginning in June 2013, WIGS released seven of its series ("Blue," "Lauren," "Jan," "Christine," "Ruth & Erica," "Audrey," and "Vanessa & Jan") on Hulu under the FOX banner. The series were recut into fewer, longer episodes for the new medium.

In September 2013, WIGS announced that "Blue" would return for a 3rd season, adding Eric Stoltz and Alexz Johnson to the cast. In 2014, the success of WIGS launched its founding members its own production company, Indigenous Media.

== Series ==
The channel features series that follow the lives of different women. The stories include a poker player on a losing streak, a mother with a secret life and one that follows a woman on a series of speed dates. Many of them follow a woman's professional life, romance, war, or family structures.

Year	Season	Series	Episode Number	Cast	Additional information
2013	1	"Susanna"	12	Anna Paquin, Maggie Grace	Written and directed by Jon Avnet. A new mother must rely on her investment-banker sister to look after her and her baby after developing postpartum depression
2013	1	"Paloma"	4	Grace Gummer, Rhys Coiro, Garret Dillahunt	A young woman deals with the unpredictability of relationships—both in romance and in the workplace. Written and directed by Julia Stiles.
2013	2	"Lauren"	12	Troian Bellisario, Jennifer Beals, Bradley Whitford, Raymond Cruz, Sean Harmon, Mykelti Williamson, iJustine, Sarah Jones	When a soldier reports an assault, she is forced to choose between what she loves and what’s right. Written by Jay Rodan and directed by Jon Avnet.
2013	3	"Blue"	40	Julia Stiles, Alexz Johnson, Uriah Shelton, David Harbour, Mark Consuelos, Jeanne Tripplehorn, Holly Robinson Peete, Kathleen Quinlan, Carla Gallo, James Morrison	Blue is a mother with a secret life. She’ll do anything to keep it from her son. But her past has other plans. Written by Rodrigo Garcia and Karen Graci. Directed by Rodrigo Garcia.
2012	1	"Ro"	6	Melonie Diaz, Scott Michael Campbell, Christopher Carley, Colleen Foy, William Mapother, AJ Trauth, Jonathan Tucker	A woman's attempt to shed her past and reinvent herself at a speed dating event is thwarted when she runs into her probation officer. Written by Mattie Brickman and directed by Patricia Cardoso.
2012	1	"Gumdrop"	Short Film	Venti Hristova	A robot's life story emerges during a casting session. Written by Kerry Conran and directed by Kerry Conran and Stephen Lawes.
2012	1	"Mary"	Short Film	Melora Walters, Patrick Fabian, Eric Roberts	An emergency room doctor is distressed when a familiar face is brought in for treatment. Written by Rodrigo Garcia and directed by Tracey Gallacher.
2012	1	"Kendra"	8	Sarah Jones, Kate Beahan, Bill Brochtrup, Jason Isaacs, Devaughn Nixon, Leland Orser, Sydney Poitier, Yaniv Rokah	A post-op nurse experiences the world of the twilight room where painful secrets of her patients under anesthesia are revealed, and the consequences play out. Written by and directed by Jon Avnet.
2012	1	"Audrey"	6	Kim Shaw, Bobby Campo, Gary Cole, Arielle Kebbel, Amy Pietz	A bubbly young woman tries to rise up the ranks in the culinary world, but her appetite for both love and haute cuisine complicates her journey. Written by Leah Rachel and directed by Betty Thomas.
2012	1	"Celia"	Short Film	Allison Janney, Dakota Fanning	A doctor is forced into an uncomfortable decision when her patient turns out to be the daughter of an old friend. Written by and directed by Rodrigo Garcia.
2012	1	"Ruth & Erica"	13	Maura Tierney, Lois Smith, Philip Baker Hall, Michael C. Hall, Steven Weber	A woman struggles with her mother's reluctance to make the life changes necessary in light of her increasing frailty. Written by and directed by Amy Lippman.
2012	1	"Georgia"	3	Mary Elizabeth Ellis, Harold Perrineau, Nancy Carell, Mark Povinelli, Rusty Schwimmer, Debra Azar, Nikki McCauley, Jason Gedrick	A yoga psychotherapist tries to bring some serenity into her clients' lives, and her own. Written by and directed by Marta Kauffman.
2012	1	"Vanessa & Jan"	6	Caitlin Gerard, Laura Spencer, Walton Goggins, Jimmy Wolk, Kevin Christy, David Del Rio, Adam Rose, Langston Fishburne	A young woman brings her friend to a speed dating event and things go awry. Written by and directed by Jon Avnet.
2012	1	"Rochelle"	3	Rosanna Arquette, Nazanin Boniadi	An ex-wife seeks revenge. Written by Scott Turow and directed by Rose Troche.
2012	1	"Jennifer"	Short Film	Dana Davis, Dawnn Lewis, Mark Ivanir, Angelique Cabral, Ty Granderson Jones, Zubevi Khalifani	In the near future, a tough job market results in a creative solution for handling dangerous convicted felons. Written and directed by Mykelti Williamson.
2012	1	"Leslie"	2	Catherine O'Hara, Anthony "Cass" Castelow	An actress vying for the role of Mother Teresa sees a chance to play the part in her real life. Written by Mitch Albom and Jesse Nesser and directed by Mitch Albom.
2012	1	"Lauren"	3	Troian Bellisario, Jennifer Beals, Mike Serlin, Alex Smith, Justin Woods	When a soldier reports an assault, she is forced to choose between what she loves and what's right. Written by Jay Rodan and directed by Lesli Linka Glatter.
2012	1	"Christine"	12	America Ferrera, Eric Balfour, Gary Dourdan, Josh Malina, Emily Rutherfurd, Corey Stoll	A young woman on a nutty evening of speed dating. Written by and directed by Rodrigo Garcia.
2012	1	"Dakota"	3	Jena Malone, Michael Massee, Jason O’Mara	A poker player on a short losing streak is invited to a high-stakes home game, but the stakes for her son are what matter most. Written and directed by Ami Canaan Mann.
2012	1	"Allison"	Short Film	Marin Ireland, Joel Johnstone	What happens when you go 90% of the way? Written and directed by Paul Brickman.
2012	1	"Denise"	Short Film	Alison Pill, Chris Messina, T. Lynn Mikeska	A girl helps a guy untangle his web of lies. Written by Neil LaBute and directed by Lee Toland Krieger.
2012	1	"Serena"	Short Film	Jennifer Garner, Alfred Molina	An aging actress. A forbidden lover. A wife who does 90%. Experience brief moments in the eclectic lives of these characters and more in our series of short films. Written by and directed by Rodrigo Garcia.
2012	1	"Jan"	15	Caitlin Gerard, Stephen Moyer, Virginia Madsen, Kyle Gallner, Jaime Murray, Laura Spencer	Jan handles a camera like a pro. Now if only she can do the same with the seductive actor, her charismatic ex, and her prickly boss. Written by and directed by Jon Avnet.

== Awards and accolades ==
Year	Season	Series	Award	Category	Recipients and nominees	Outcome
2012	1	"Blue"	IAWTV	Best Female Performance Drama	Julia Stiles	Winner
2012	1	"Lauren"	IAWTV	Best Female Performance Drama	Troian Bellisario	Nominee
2012	1	"Lauren"	Streamy Awards	Best Drama Series	N/A	Nominee
2012	1	"Lauren"	Streamy Awards	Best Female Performance Drama	Troian Bellisario	Nominee
2012	1	"Jan"	Streamy Awards	Best Director	Jon Avnet	Nominee
2012	1	"Lauren"	Writers Guild of America	Outstanding Achievement in Writing Original New Media	Jay Rodan	Nominee
2012	1	"Lauren"	New York Festivals	Best Drama Series	N/A	Nominee
2012	1	"Blue"	New York Festivals	Best Performance By An Actress	Julia Stiles	Nominee
2012	1	"Lauren"	New York Festivals	Best Performance By An Actress	Troian Bellisario	Winner
2013	2	"Blue"	IAWTV	Best Drama Series	N/A	Nominee
2013	2	"Susanna"	IAWTV	Best Drama Series	N/A	Nominee
2013	2	"Blue"	IAWTV	Best Directing (Drama)	Rodrigo Garcia	Winner
2013	2	"Lauren"	IAWTV	Best Directing (Drama)	Jon Avnet	Nominee
2013	2	"Blue"	IAWTV	Best Female Performance (Drama)	Julia Stiles	Winner
2013	2	"Lauren"	IAWTV	Best Female Performance (Drama)	Troian Bellisario	Nominee
2013	2	"Susanna"	IAWTV	Best Female Performance (Drama)	Maggie Grace	Nominee
2013	2	"Susanna"	IAWTV	Best Female Performance (Drama)	Anna Paquin	Nominee
2013	2	"Blue"	IAWTV	Best Writing (Drama)	Rodrigo Garcia	Nominee
2013	2	"Lauren"	IAWTV	Best Writing (Drama)	Jay Rodan Jon Avnet	Nominee
2013	2	WIGS	IAWTV	Best Online Channel	N/A	Winner
2013	2	"Lauren"	IAWTV	Best Returning Series	N/A	Nominee
