= Time Expired =

Time Expired may refer to:

- Time Expired (1992 film)
- Time Expired (2011 film)
