= Mary Kate Wiles =

American film and web series actress (born 1987)

- Born: March 28, 1987 (age 39); Fayetteville, Arkansas, U.S.
- Education: University of Southern California
- Occupation: Actress
- Years active: 2007–present
- Known for: The Lizzie Bennet Diaries; Squaresville
- Spouse: Sean Persaud (m. 2023)
- Website: MaryKateWiles.com

Mary Kate Wiles (born March 28, 1987) is an American film and web series actress. She is known for her award-winning portrayal as Ally in the film The Sound and the Shadow, in web series such as Lydia Bennet in the Emmy-winning Pride and Prejudice adaptation The Lizzie Bennet Diaries, as well as the audiobook of the sequel, The Epic Adventures of Lydia Bennet, as Zelda Waring in Squaresville, as Sansa Stark in the Game of Thrones parody School of Thrones, Tatiana in Spies Are Forever, Annabel Lee in Edgar Allan Poe's Murder Mystery Dinner Party, Artemis Schue-Horyn in Wayward Guide for the Untrained Eye, Vicky in The Fairly OddParents: Fairly Odder, and Kat Van Tassel in Headless: A Sleepy Hollow Story.

== Early life ==
Wiles was raised in Fayetteville, AR, where she took dance and music classes as a child. She moved to Los Angeles at the age of 18 attend the University of Southern California, where she received two degrees, in English Literature and Theatre.

== Career ==
Since 2012, Wiles had starring roles in feature-films. 2010, she played the role of Alicia Larch in Dark Woods. 2012, she portrayed Lily Blush in the independent feature Dreamworld, starring alongside Whit Hertford. She also stars as Ally in the film The Sound and the Shadow.

In 2013, Wiles was nominated for an IAWTV Award for Best Actress in a Comedy. She, along with co-stars Kylie Sparks, Tiffany Ariany, Austin Rogers, David Ryan Speer, and Christine Weatherup won the award for Best Ensemble Cast for Squaresville. Wiles was a finalist for the 2nd Annual Streamys Audience Choice award for Personality of the Year.

Since 2012, Wiles vlogged regularly on her YouTube channel, producing music covers, fashion, and videos on various aspects of acting. Since 2014, this channel is Patreon sponsored.

In 2015, Wiles joined the internet production company Shipwrecked Comedy, after starring in their web series Kissing in the Rain. She went on to star in many more of Shipwrecked's projects, most notably as Annabel Lee in Edgar Allan Poe's Murder Mystery Dinner Party.

Wiles announced in March 2022 that she will play the role of Vicky in the live-action reboot of The Fairly OddParents, called The Fairly OddParents: Fairly Odder, which premiered on Paramount+ on March 31, 2022.

== Education ==
While attending the University of Southern California, Wiles performed in eight productions in four years—including Brigadoon (Jean), Hello Again (The Nurse), and The Pajama Game (Poopsie)—and two professional productions outside of school. She was a member of Alpha Delta Pi, and she studied abroad at the British American Drama Academy.

Wiles graduated in 2009 with two degrees—a BA in both Theatre and English Literature.

== Personal life ==
Wiles has been in a relationship with fellow actor and Shipwrecked Comedy member Sean Persaud since 2014. The two announced their engagement in April 2022, and married in Oahu, Hawaii on March 11, 2023.

== Filmography ==
=== Film ===
Year	Title	Role	Notes
2007	Into the Night	Chloe	Short film
2008	Ridiculously Emo	Brenda	Short film
2009	Lovebot	Sarah	Short film
2009	The Sound and the Shadow	Ally	
2009	Dreamworld	Lily Blush	
2009	Nefarious: Merchant of Souls	Ally	
2009	Dark Woods	Alicia Larch	
2011	Elliott	Audrey	Short film
2011	Prism	Nessa	Short film
2011	Harems	Harem Girl/Princess	Video short
2011	Murder in the Dark	Taylor	
2012	The Newest Pledge	Vanessa	
2014	Hello, My Name Is Frank	Kim	
2014	Bridge and Tunnel	Christine Goodrich	
2014	I Ship It	Zoe Smallman	Short film
2015	Spies Are Forever	Tatiana Slozhno	Musical
2025	Anpanman: Apple Boy and Everyone's Hope	Apple Boy, Cream Panda	Netflix dub of 2014 anime film
2025	Anpanman: Shine! Kulun and the Star of Life	Kulun, Cream Panda	Netflix dub of 2018 anime film

=== TV series ===
Year	Title	Role	Notes
2010	Looking for Grace	Mystery Girl	
2011	Awkward Universe	Megan	Episode: "Cool Video Desertion"
2012	The Middle	Beth	Episode: "Life Skills"
2013	The Style Club	Herself	Episode: "Mary Kate Wiles on The Style Club"
2013	The Goreys	Tori Gorey	
2015	Talking Marriage with Ryan Bailey	Herself	Episode: "Mary Kate Wiles"
2016	Code Black	Betsy	Episode: "Demons and Angels"
2016	Ultimate Spider-Man	Frances Beck	Episode: "The Moon Knight Before Christmas"
2022	The Fairly OddParents: Fairly Odder	Vicky	Recurring role

=== Internet productions ===
Year	Title	Role	Notes
2011	Asst: The Webseries	Erica Morrison	All 5 episodes
2012–13	The Lizzie Bennet Diaries	Lydia Bennet	32 episodes
2012–13	The Lydia Bennet!!	Lydia Bennet	All 29 episodes
2012–13	Squaresville	Zelda	All 31 episodes
2013	School of Thrones	Sansa Stark	YouTube series; 3 episodes
2014	Kissing in the Rain	Lily	7 episodes
2015	Muzzled the Musical	Hadey	YouTube series
2016	Edgar Allan Poe's Murder Mystery Dinner Party	Annabel Lee	YouTube series; 10 episodes
2017	The Case of the Gilded Lily	Vivian Nightingale	YouTube Short Film
2018	American Whoopee	Millie	YouTube Short Film
2020	Wayward Guide for the Untrained Eye	Artemis Schue-Horyn	YouTube series; 10 episodes
2022	Headless: A Sleepy Hollow Story	Kat Van Tassel	YouTube series; 10 episodes
2023	The Case of the Greater Gatsby	Vivian Nightingale	Podcast series; 7 episodes
2023	Workin’ Boys	Starlight Producer	YouTube Short Film

== Stage ==
Year	Title	Role	Notes
2016	Spies Are Forever	Tatiana Slozhno	NoHo Arts Center
2024	Cinderella's Castle	Female Understudy	El Portal Theatre
2025	The Guy Who Didn't Like Musicals Reprised	Understudy for Charlotte, et al. / Alice, et al.	El Portal Theatre

== Awards ==
Awards
Year	Work	Category/award	Organisation	Result.
2014	The Sound and the Shadow	Best Actress	North Hollywood Film Festival	Won
