= Star Kid =

1998 film by Manny Coto

- Theatrical release poster
- Directed by: Manny Coto
- Written by: Manny Coto
- Produced by: Jennie Lew Tugend
- Starring: Joseph Mazzello; Richard Gilliland
- Cinematography: Ronn Schmidt
- Edited by: Bob Ducsay
- Music by: Nicholas Pike
- Distributed by: Trimark Pictures
- Release dates: November 13, 1997 (Singapore); January 16, 1998 (US)
- Running time: 101 minutes
- Country: United States
- Language: English
- Budget: $12 million
- Box office: $7 million

Star Kid (originally titled The Warrior of Waverly Street) is a 1997 American superhero film directed and written by Manny Coto and starring Joseph Mazzello, Richard Gilliland, and Corinne Bohrer.

In the film, an ordinary schoolboy acquires an extraterrestrial exoskeletal-suit with its own artificial intelligence. He melds with the suit and has to adjust to his new superhuman abilities. The film received mixed reviews from critics and grossed $7 million against a $12 million budget.

== Plot ==
The life of a shy, seventh-grader Spencer Griffith, who has a crush on a schoolmate named Michelle Eberhardt, changes one night when he sees a mysterious meteorite, as it crashes down into a nearby junkyard. Sneaking out of his house to investigate, he discovers the meteorite to actually be a small rocket carrying a "Cybersuit", a prototype exoskeletal-suit with artificial intelligence from another galaxy. He decides to try it on and melds with it, but requires some time to adjust to the experience, including the new speed and strength, and then starts testing out its various primary functions and abilities, deciding to call it "Cy".

He proceeds to go around town doing whatever he wants, starting with getting back at bully Manfred "Turbo" Bruntley, then saving Michelle and her friends from a damaged Rock-O-Plane and ordering food from a fast-food restaurant drive-thru. He also endures the hilarious antics of trashing part of his house after getting his head stuck inside the refrigerator, discovering the unappealing way that it will allow him to eat his take-out food, and finding a way to urinate when it won't let him out to do so.

Meanwhile, Earth is visited by a Broodwarrior, a member of an alien race of world-conquering insectoids that are currently waging a war against Cy's creator, Tenris De'Thar, and his fellow Trelkins, who developed it as a weapon to turn the tide of the war, but was forced to launch it into space due to a Broodwarrior attack. The Broodwarrior's mission is to find and capture it so his race can analyze it. After first encountering the Broodwarrior, Spencer escapes, forces Cy to let him out, and abandons it, afraid he might not "live to see his next birthday" if he "engages" the Broodwarrior. Back home, after looking over one of his comic books titled MidKnight Warrior and thinking about what the title character, in his situation, would do, he goes back out to find Cy. He unexpectedly finds himself accompanied by Turbo, who gradually becomes his friend, only to find the Broodwarrior has taken Cy. They head to the junkyard, where it is about to be taken off-world by the Broodwarrior, and create a plan to distract it long enough to allow Spencer to rescue Cy. Spencer does so and begins battling the Broodwarrior.

During the battle, the Broodwarrior gets the upper hand, and Cy is bashed multiple times by the Broodwarrior's mace, severely damaging it, and forcing it to eject Spencer before it goes completely offline. Spencer covers it with scrap metal to hide it from the Broodwarrior, takes a piece of it, and continues to fight the Broodwarrior, who had started trying to chase down Turbo. Spencer confronts the Broodwarrior before getting chased himself and is suddenly cornered inside a junked ice cream truck. Just when the Broodwarrior is about to dispose of Spencer, Turbo finds a control panel and activates the car crusher the truck is sitting in, revealing the chase into it to be part of a trap. Spencer escapes while the truck is compressed into a solid metal cube, killing the Broodwarrior.

With the Broodwarrior now destroyed, Spencer and Turbo return to Cy but it appears that they were too late to save it. Just as Spencer begins to lose hope, Tenris De'Thar and a small group of Trelkin soldiers appear from a giant UFO orbiting Earth and quickly repair Cy, reviving it. After Spencer says goodbye to Cy, the head alien soldier gives him a badge for his bravery and courage before their departure back to their home-world, and the long, eventful night finally comes to an end. The next day at school, a now confident Spencer, encouraged by Turbo, starts up a conversation with Michelle.

== Cast ==
- Joseph Mazzello as Spencer Griffith/Star Kid
- Richard Gilliland as Roland Griffith
- Corinne Bohrer as Janet Holloway
  - Arthur Burghardt as "Cy" (voice)
- Joey Simmrin as Manfred "Turbo" Bruntley
- Brian Simpson as the Broodwarrior
- Ashlee Levitch as Stacey Griffith
- Jack McGee as Hank Bruntley
- Danny Masterson as Kevin
- Lauren Eckstrom as Michelle Eberhardt
- Bobby Porter as Nath the Trelkin
- Larry Nicholas as Tenris DeasThar the Trelkin
- Rusty Hanson as Trelkin
- Terry Castillo as Trelkin
- Christine Weatherup as Nadia
- Yumi Adachi as Mika

== Production ==
The film was part of an effort by Trimark Pictures to enter into larger films. At the 1995 American Film Market, it was positioned as Trimark's flagship product when it was previewed to foreign distributors under its original title, The Warrior of Waverly Street.

== Reception ==
=== Box office ===
The film grossed a domestic total of $7,029,025, making it a box office bomb from its estimated $12 million budget.

=== Critical response ===
On the review aggregator website Rotten Tomatoes, the film holds an approval rating of 43% with an average rating of 5.37/10 based on 14 reviews. In his review for the Chicago Sun-Times, Roger Ebert (who gave it 3 out of 4 stars) said, "Star Kid, written and directed by Manny Coto, has a sweet heart and a lot of sly wit, and the symbiosis between boy and cyborg is handled cleverly. For kids of a certain age, it pushes the right buttons."

== Home media ==
In the United States, the film was released on VHS and DVD format in 1998. It was also released on VHS in the UK and is now available on DVD.

== Soundtrack ==
All tracks (with the exception of the first two tracks) were composed by Nicholas Pike. The soundtrack was released on compact disc by Sonic Images (January 27, 1998) and further released for download through BSX Records (January 29, 2013) with modified cover art.

Star Kid (Original Motion Picture Soundtrack)

Film score by Nicholas Pike
- Released: January 27, 1998
- Genre: Soundtrack
- Length: 70:13

Track Listing
No.	Title	Notes	Length
1.	"Magic Carpet Ride"	Steppenwolf cover by Edgar Winter	4:22
2.	"Shadow in the Shade"	Performed by Theresa Musser	4:21
3.	"Battle on Trelkas"		5:07
4.	"Another Fun Day at School"		1:04
5.	"Turbo Trouble"		4:19
6.	"The Cybersuit Arrives"		6:20
7.	"Turbo Takes a Spin"		3:07
8.	"In the Fairground"		4:41
9.	"Mom"		2:03
10.	"Rearranging the Kitchen"		1:58
11.	"Broodwarrior Arrives"		1:43
12.	"On the Bridge"		4:40
13.	"Anyone for Tennis"		1:31
14.	"Home Improvement"		6:31
15.	"Joyride in the Junkyard"		3:35
16.	"Cy Runs Out of Steam"		6:49
17.	"Trelkins Arrive"		2:46
18.	"Farewell to the Trelkins"		2:35
19.	"Finale"		2:41
Total length:			70:13

== Comic ==
A prequel was released in comic book form, written by Manny Coto with art by John Stokes. It was published by Dark Horse Comics, first as a two-issue miniseries under the film's original title of The Warrior of Waverly Street in 1996 and later as a one-shot titled Star Kid in 1998.

== See also ==
- List of films featuring powered exoskeletons
