= International Academy of Web Television =

Organization for streaming television

- Founded: 2008; 18 years ago
- Founder: Brady Brim-DeForest, Marc Hustvedt
- Location: Los Angeles, California, U.S.
- Region served: Entertainment industry
- Website: iawtv.org

The International Academy of Web Television (IAWTV) was founded in 2008 and is devoted to the advancement of the arts and sciences of streaming television and web series production.

Since 2011, the academy has hosted an annual awards ceremony called the IAWTV Awards, which honors web series creators and talent in over a dozen categories, voted on by the IAWTV membership.

== Background ==
In the past, IAWTV membership was by invitation only, however, membership is now open to a range of digital professionals through an online application form. Members represent a full cross-section of roles and specialties in web television creation, production and distribution.

In 2017, the IAWTV became a division of The Caucus, an organization that began in the 1970s to elevate television programming for producers, writers and directors.

== Governance ==
The IAWTV is a membership-based organization. Members of the current board are:

- Tina Cesa Ward, Chairman of the Board and Executive Committee Member of The Caucus
- Sandra Payne, Vice Chairman

== IAWTV Awards ==
In 2010, the IAWTV hosted the 2nd annual Streamy Awards. The poor reception of the event, and the surrounding controversy, resulted in a two-year hiatus for the Streamy Awards, and the subsequent creation of the IAWTV Awards. The two awards ceremonies are both still running annually, though as completely separate entities.

Since its inception in 2011, the IAWTV has held award ceremonies every year (with the exception of 2016), presenting awards to web series creators and talent in over a dozen categories, covering several genres. Notable IAWTV winners include Felicia Day, Julia Stiles and Milo Ventimiglia, as well as the critically acclaimed web series The Guild, Blue, Anyone But Me, Husbands, and Whatever, Linda.

Between 2012 and 2015, the IAWTV Awards were held in Las Vegas. The 2017 ceremony took place in Los Angeles.

== See also ==
- Streamy Awards
- Academy of Television Arts & Sciences
