= Nick Bernardone =

American writer, comedian, director

- Born: Nicholas Francis Bernardone; Syracuse, NY
- Education: SUNY Fredonia, NYU
- Notable work: 30 Rock, Unbreakable Kimmy Schmidt, The Walking Dead, Fear the Walking Dead

Comedy career
- Years active: 2008–present
- Medium: television, Internet, music, live performance
- Genres: Sketch comedy, situational comedy, parody, horror, action

Nick Bernardone is an American writer, producer and director from Syracuse, NY aka “Little Hollywood”. His credits include Unbreakable Kimmy Schmidt, 30 Rock, Marvel's Wastelanders, The Walking Dead and Fear the Walking Dead. Nick has been nominated for five Emmy Awards, and won a WGA Award and PGA Award.

== Career ==
Early TV credits include Emmy Award winning 30 Rock and Netflix's Unbreakable Kimmy Schmidt. Later work includes AMC's Fear the Walking Dead and "The Walking Dead". Additional credits are "Marvel's Wastelanders", Saturday Night Live, HBO's Crashing, Bloodline, and Master of None. Hot Garbage Video has produced several web videos such as series Bromos and Army Husbands. Classless was an official selection in the 2013 New York Television Festival. On February 2, 2022 it was announced Nick was attached to adapt the popular fantasy series The Riftwar Cycle for a potential television series. On December 5, 2022 it was announced Nick would co-write the final chapter in the crossover audio series Marvel's Wastelanders. Nick has been nominated for five Emmy Awards, and won a WGA Award and PGA Award.

== Filmography ==
Year	Title	Credited as			Notes
Year	Title	Writer	Producer	Other	Notes
2010-2013	30 Rock: Webisodes	Yes	Yes	Yes	Wrote episodes, Editor
2013	Classless	Yes	Yes	Yes	Director, Editor
2015-19	Unbreakable Kimmy Schmidt	Yes	Yes	Yes	Wrote 2 episodes, Co-Producer, Script Coordinator, Associate Producer
2017-18	The Walking Dead: Red Machete	Yes	Yes	Yes	short film
2020	Unbreakable Kimmy Schmidt: Kimmy vs the Reverend	No	Yes	No	Co-Producer
2018-22	Fear the Walking Dead	Yes	Yes	Yes	Wrote 9 episodes, Producer, Co-Producer, Script Coordinator, Staff Writer
2022-23	Marvel's Wastelanders	Yes	No	No	Wrote 4 episodes
2022-23	The Riftwar Cycle	Yes	Yes	Yes	Developer

== Awards and nominations ==
Year	Award	Category	Work	Result
2012	Emmy Award	Outstanding Special Class – Short-Format Nonfiction Program	30 Rock: Ask Tina	Nominated
2013	Producers Guild of America Award	Outstanding Digital Series	30 Rock: The Webisodes	Won
2013	Emmy Award	Outstanding Special Class – Short-Format Nonfiction Program	30 Rock: The Final Season	Nominated
2013	Emmy Award	Outstanding Special Class – Short-format Live-Action Entertainment Programs	30 Rock: The Webisodes	Nominated
2017	Emmy Award	Outstanding Creative Achievement in Interactive Media Within an Unscripted Program	Stand For Rights: A Benefit for the ACLU with Tom Hanks	Nominated
2018	Writers Guild of America Award	Short Form New Media Adapted	Red Machete, "Behind Us"	Nominated
2018	Emmy Award	Outstanding Short Form Comedy or Drama Series	The Walking Dead: Red Machete	Nominated
2019	Writers Guild of America Award	Short Form New Media Adapted	Red Machete, "What We Become"	Won
