= Rodrigo García (director) =

Colombian and Mexican television and film director

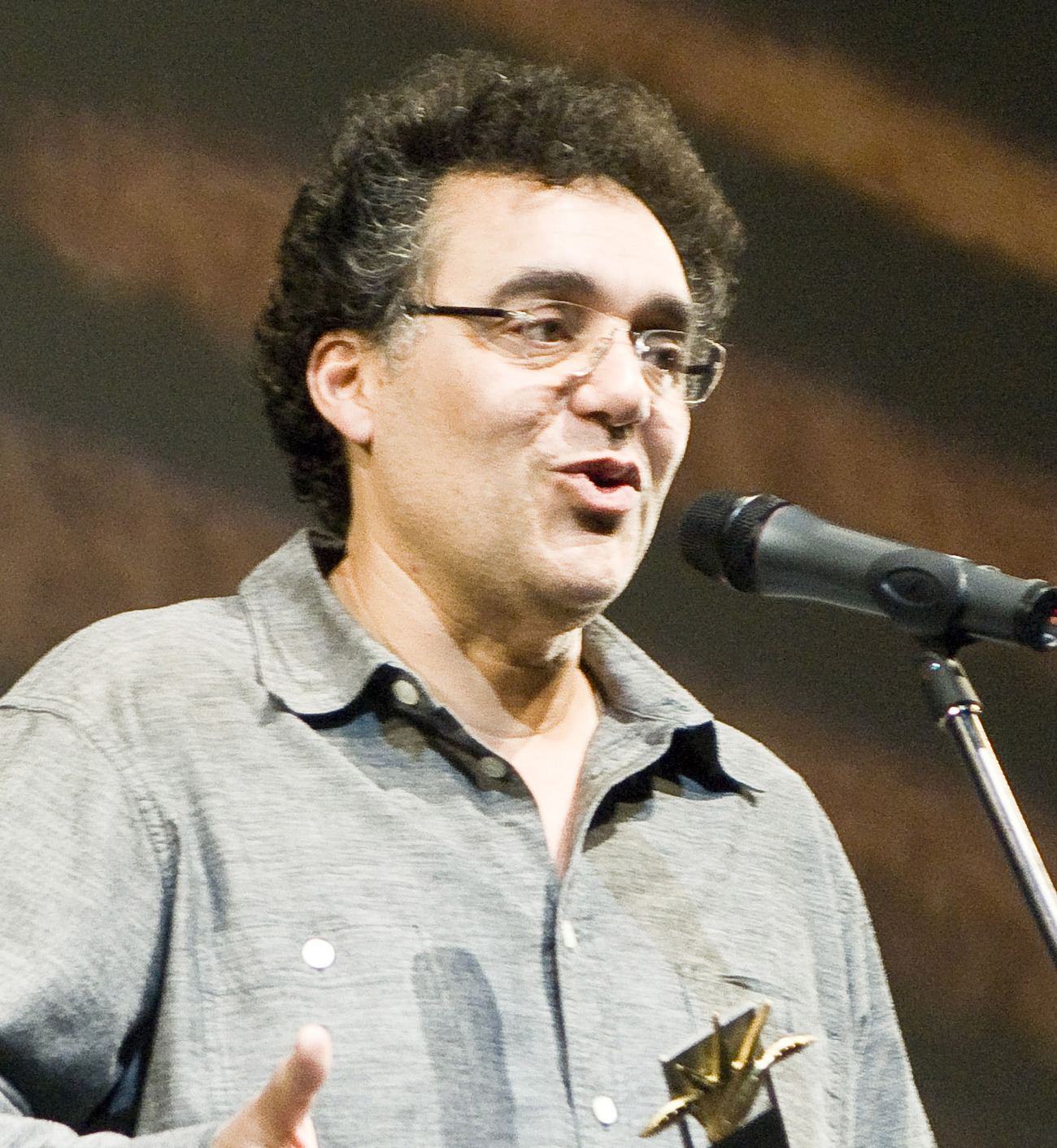
- García in 2010
- Born: Rodrigo García Barcha; 24 August 1959 (age 66); Bogotá, D.C., Colombia
- Education: Harvard College (BA); AFI Conservatory
- Occupations: Director, screenwriter
- Years active: 1989–present
- Spouse: Adriana Sheinbaum
- Parents: Gabriel García Márquez (father); Mercedes Barcha (mother)
- Relatives: Gonzalo García (brother); Claudia Sheinbaum (sister-in-law)

Rodrigo García Barcha (born 24 August 1959) is a Colombian and Mexican television and film director, screenwriter, author and former cinematographer, best known for his films Nine Lives (2005), Mother and Child (2009), Albert Nobbs (2011), Last Days in the Desert (2015), as well as his work on the HBO drama series In Treatment. He also created, wrote, and directed the award-winning web series Blue (2012–2015), starring Julia Stiles, for which he won an IAWTV Award in 2014. In 2021 García released his first memoir, A Farewell to Gabo and Mercedes: A Son's Memoir of Gabriel García Márquez and Mercedes Barcha.

== Life and career ==
García was born in Bogotá, Colombia, a son of Colombian Nobel-winner writer Gabriel García Márquez and Mercedes Barcha Pardo. Because of his father, he grew up around Carlos Fuentes, Álvaro Mutis, Julio Cortázar, Pablo Neruda and Luis Buñuel.

García is married to Adriana Sheinbaum, a teacher who is the sister of Mexican president Claudia Sheinbaum.

García has directed a variety of independent films, such as the award-winning Nine Lives (2005), which was nominated for the William Shatner Golden Groundhog Award for Best Underground Movie, and Albert Nobbs (2011), which screened at several film festivals, as well as episodes of several HBO series, including Six Feet Under, Carnivàle, and Big Love. He produced and developed the HBO drama series In Treatment.

He worked as a camera operator for Cold Heaven, Reality Bites, A Walk in the Clouds, The Birdcage, Twilight and Great Expectations, and as director of photography for Gia and Poison Ivy.

In 2012, García and Jon Avnet created WIGS, a web channel part of YouTube Original Channel Initiative that produces scripted drama mainly targeted to female audiences. For WIGS, García created, wrote and directed several web series, notably Blue, starring Julia Stiles, for which he won an IAWTV Award for Best Director – Drama in 2014. In 2014 the founders of WIGS decided to launch his independent production company Indigenous Media.

== Filmography ==
=== Feature films ===
Year	Film	Credited as				Notes
Year	Film	Director	Writer	Producer	Cinematographer	Notes
1989	Lola				Yes	
1991	Danzón				Yes	
1992	Mi querido Tom Mix				Yes	
1992	The Minister's Wife				Yes	
1993	Mi Vida Loca				Yes	
1994	Something Extraordinary				Yes	
1995	Four Rooms				Yes	
1999	Body Shots				Yes	
2000	Things You Can Tell Just by Looking at Her	Yes	Yes			
2001	Ten Tiny Love Stories	Yes	Yes			
2005	Nine Lives	Yes	Yes			
2008	Passengers	Yes				
2009	Mother and Child	Yes	Yes			
2010	Revolución	Yes				
2010	The Pilgrims			Yes		Documentary.
2011	Albert Nobbs	Yes				
2014	Jackie & Ryan			Yes		
2015	Last Days in the Desert	Yes	Yes			
2016	The Sweet Life			Yes		
2016	Sickhouse			Yes		
2017	Walking Out			Yes		
2020	Four Good Days	Yes	Yes	Yes		
2022	Raymond & Ray	Yes	Yes	No		Screening at the Toronto International Film Festival 2022 and at the BIFF in October
2023	Familia	Yes	Yes	No		Netflix
2025	The Follies	Yes	Yes	No		Netflix

=== TV series ===
Year	Series	Credited as			
Year	Series	Director	Writer	Producer	Notes
1999–2007	The Sopranos	Yes			One episode (All Happy Families...).
2001–2005	Six Feet Under	Yes			5 episodes.
2002–2003	Boomtown	Yes			One episode (Monster's Brawl).
2003–2005	Carnivàle	Yes			5 episodes.
2006–2007	Six Degrees	Yes			One episode (Pilot).
2006–2011	Big Love	Yes			One episode (Pilot).
2007	Tell Me You Love Me	Yes			One episode (Episode 4 from Season 1).
2008–2011	In Treatment	Yes	Yes	Yes	21 episodes.
2012	Audrey			Yes	Part of the WIGS Series.
2012	Christine	Yes	Yes	Yes	Part of the WIGS Series. All episodes (12).
2012	Dakota			Yes	Part of the WIGS Series.
2012	Georgia			Yes	Part of the WIGS Series.
2012	Jan			Yes	Part of the WIGS Series.
2012	Kendra			Yes	Part of the WIGS Series.
2012	Leslie			Yes	Part of the WIGS Series.
2012	Ro			Yes	Part of the WIGS Series.
2012	Rochelle			Yes	Part of the WIGS Series.
2012	Ruth & Erica			Yes	Part of the WIGS Series.
2012	Vanessa & Jan			Yes	Part of the WIGS Series.
2012–2013	Lauren			Yes	Part of the WIGS Series.
2012–2015	Blue	Yes	Yes	Yes	Part of the WIGS Series. All episodes (42).
2013	Susanna			Yes	Part of the WIGS Series.
2013–2014	Paloma			Yes	Part of the WIGS Series.
2014	Delirium	Yes			TV pilot
2015	Gone: A Wayward Pines Story			Yes	TV mini-series. Spin-off of Wayward Pines.
2016	Bull	Yes		Yes	One episode (The Necklace).
2018	The Affair	Yes			3 episodes.
2018	The Good Cop	Yes			One episode (Who is The Ugly German Lady?).
2020	Party of Five	Yes			2 episodes
2024	One Hundred Years of Solitude			Executive	8 episodes

=== TV films ===
Year	Feature film	Credited as				
Year	Feature film	Director	Writer	Producer	Cinematographer	Notes
1989	El verano de la señora Forbes				Yes	
1995	Indictment: The McMartin Trial				Yes	
1998	Gia				Yes	
2005	Fathers and Sons	Yes	Yes	Yes		

=== Short films ===
Year	Short film	Credited as				
Year	Short film	Director	Writer	Producer	Cinematographer	Notes
1989	Aram				Yes	
2007	Put It in a Book	Yes				
2009	Tired of Being Funny	Yes	Yes			
2012	Celia	Yes	Yes	Yes		Part of the WIGS Series.
2012	Mary		Yes	Yes		Part of the WIGS Series.
2012	Serena	Yes	Yes	Yes		Part of the WIGS Series.

== Books ==
- Garcia, Rodrigo (2021). A Farewell to Gabo and Mercedes: A Son's Memoir of Gabriel García Márquez and Mercedes Barcha. New York: HarperVia. ISBN 9780063158337. OCLC 1243908337.
