= I Ship It (film) =

American romantic comedy film

I Ship It is a 2014 romantic comedy digital short film written and directed by Yulin Kuang. The film stars Mary Kate Wiles and Sean Persaud. It was released as part of the Incubator series, funded by the studio New Form Digital.

== Plot ==
In the wake of a terrible break-up with her boyfriend and Wizard rock bandmate Peter Hackett, Zoe Smallman decides to get revenge by competing with him in a local Battle of the Bands. Charlie, Zoe's close friend, has also recently gone through a break-up with his girlfriend, Laurel. After commiserating together about their relationship troubles, Zoe and Charlie kiss, but decide to remain platonic. The pair write an original song for Zoe to perform at the Battle of the Bands. Zoe loses to Peter and his new girlfriend, Macy, but Peter still proposes that he and Zoe reform their band. Charlie is incredulous that Zoe would consider working with Peter again, and the two get in an argument where Charlie admits he does in fact have romantic feelings for Zoe. The films ends with the pair apologizing to each other in the wake of the argument, and Zoe tentatively returning Charlie's feelings.

== Cast ==
- Mary Kate Wiles as Zoe Smallman
- Sean Persaud as Charlie
- Joey Richter as Peter Hackett
- Jenna C. Johnson as Macy

== Production ==
Writer-director Yulin Kuang initially gained the attention of New Form Digital studio through her YouTube account, where she had previously posted short films and web-series. I Ship It was created for the Incubator series, where New Form Digital partnered with 14 YouTubers and financed the creation of 14 short films all based on the theme of 'curiosity'. While Kuang originally thought about having the story revolve more heavily around the two main characters being vloggers, she decided instead to focus on fandom culture, particularly the Harry Potter fandom and Wizard rock. Stylistically, in terms of set design, color grading, and editing, the film is heavily inspired by the work of directors Wes Anderson and Edgar Wright, and specifically Wright's film Scott Pilgrim vs. the World. The music for the film was composed by Brian Grider, James Wolpert, and Kirstyn Hippe, and Hippe in particular wrote the two musical numbers featured in the film, "Honeydukes" and "Horcruxes".

== Release ==
The film was released on October 16th, 2014, being uploaded directly to YouTube along with the other Incubator shorts. A clip from the film, featuring Wiles and Persaud, would go on to be shown as the opener for the Shorts program at the 2015 Sundance Film Festival. In 2016, the short would be adapted into the CW series of the same name, I Ship It. Originally cancelled after airing on television, the second season of the series was released in 2019, as web-exclusive content on CW Seed.
