= Squaresville =

- Genre: Comedy
- Created by: Matt Enlow
- Written by: Matt Enlow
- Directed by: Matt Enlow
- Starring: Mary Kate Wiles; Kylie Sparks; Austin Rogers; Tiffany Ariany; David Ryan Speer; Christine Weatherup
- Country of origin: United States
- Original language: English

Production
- Executive producer: Christine Weatherup
- Production locations: Los Angeles, California
- Running time: 2-8 minutes

Original release
- Network: YouTube
- Release: March 16, 2012 – September 13, 2013

Squaresville is an American comedy web series created by Matt Enlow. The series follows best friends Esther (Kylie Sparks) and Zelda (Mary Kate Wiles) as they deal with life in their suburban town, one adventure at a time. It premiered on YouTube on March 16, 2012.

The series was financed by a Kickstarter campaign that successfully raised $12,000 from 196 backers to complete production of its first season.

In 2012, Squaresville joined the Big Frame YouTube network. On February 1, 2013, Squaresville launched its second season.

== Cast ==
- Mary Kate Wiles as Zelda Waring
- Kylie Sparks as Esther
- Austin Rogers as Percy
- Tiffany Ariany as Shelly
- David Ryan Speer as Wayne
- Christine Weatherup as Sarah Waring

== Awards and nominations ==
=== Won ===
2013 IAWTV

- Best Comedy Web Series
- Best Ensemble Performance
- Best Writing (Comedy): Matt Enlow

=== Nominated ===
2013 IAWTV

- Best Directing (Comedy): Matt Enlow
- Best Female Performance (Comedy): Mary Kate Wiles
- Best Female Performance (Comedy): Kylie Sparks
