= Susan Miller (playwright) =

American dramatist

Susan Miller, recipient of a Guggenheim Fellowship in Playwriting, is perhaps best known as the author/performer of the critically acclaimed one woman play, My Left Breast and as Executive Producer and writer for the award-winning web series Anyone But Me. For her work on the web series she (and creative partner Tina Cesa Ward) won the first Writers Guild of America Award for Outstanding Achievement in Writing Original New Media.

== Career ==
Miller is a writer for stage, screen and new media. She has received playwriting fellowships from the National Endowment for the Arts as well as a Rockefeller Grant and a residency at Yaddo. Miller won her first Obie Award for Nasty Rumors And Final Remarks. A Map Of Doubt And Rescue won the Susan Smith Blackburn Prize and the Pinter Prize for Drama. She won a second Obie Award, as well as a shared Blackburn Prize, for her one-woman play, My Left Breast which she performed all over the country.

Her plays have been produced by The Public Theater, The Mark Taper Forum, Second Stage, Naked Angels, Actors Theatre of Louisville's Humana Festival, New York Stage & Film, Trinity Rep, The O'Neill Playwrights Conference, Ojai Playwrights Conference, Plan B Theatre, Hampstead Theatre, among others. Her articles have appeared in O: The Oprah Magazine, American Theatre, The Dramatist, Ms Magazine, Girlfriends, and The Bark.

Miller co-ran the Dramatists Guild Fellows program from 2006 until 2012. She served for three years as the director of the Legacy Project, a writing workshop for people with life-threatening illness, with a grant from the Lila Wallace Fund. She has taught in the Dramatic Writing Program at New York University; The Writer's Voice at the Westside Y; Rutgers University; Penn State University and UCLA

== Activism ==
In 1977, Miller became an associate of the Women's Institute for Freedom of the Press (WIFP). WIFP is an American nonprofit publishing organization. The organization works to increase communication between women and connect the public with forms of women-based media.

== Awards ==
She won a Robert Chesley Award in 1996.

== Works ==
=== Plays ===
- Sweeping The Nation
- Reading List
- The Grand Design
- Map Of Doubt And Rescue
- It's Our Town, Too
- Backstory
- My Left Breast
- For Dear Life
- Repairs
- Arts And Leisure
- FLUX
- Nasty Rumors And Final Remarks
- Cross Country,
- Confessions Of A Female Disorder
- Denim Lecture
- Silverstein & Co
- Daddy, And A Commotion Of Zebras
- No One Is Exactly 23
- 20th Century Blues

=== Screenplays ===
- The Last Thing We Ever Do, for Disney;
- Blessing In Disguise for Warner Bros.;
- The History Of Us for Caravan;
- Becoming The Smiths, for Fox 2000,
- Lady Beware, starring Diane Lane.

=== Teleplays ===
- Thirtysomething (Story Editor)
- Trials Of Rosie O'Neill (Story Supervisor)
- LA Law
- Urban Anxiety (Producer/Head Writer)
- The L Word, (Consulting producer/writer)
- Dynasty (Wrote 2 episodes)
- Family

=== Webseries ===
- "Anyone But Me" (Executive Producer/Writer)
- "Bestsellers" (Creator/Writer)
- "Suite 7" (Writer, "Good In Bed")
