= The Walking Dead: Red Machete =

Walking Dead webseries spin off

- Genre: Zombie, Horror
- Based on: The Walking Dead by Robert Kirkman and Tony Moore
- Written by: Nick Bernardone
- Directed by: Avi Youabian
- Starring: Anais Lilit, Jose Rosete, Sofia Esmaili, Christopher Troy, Michael Wayne Foster, Jeff Kober, Davi Jay, Jonathan Richard King, Hamid-Reza Benjamin Thompson
- Composers: Jason Akers, Sam Ewing
- Country of origin: United States
- Original language: English
- No. of seasons: 1
- No. of episodes: 16

Production
- Executive producers: Noam Dromi, John Gado Marcelin, Jay Williams,
- Producers: Rob Newman, Alex Coley Brown, Nick Bernardone, Avi Youabian
- Cinematography: Alice Brooks

Original release
- Network: AMC
- Release: October 22, 2017 – April 15, 2018

Related
- The Walking Dead

The Walking Dead: Red Machete is a Primetime Emmy Nominated 2017 web series, serving as a spinoff to The Walking Dead and distributed by AMC Network. The show was directed by Avi Youabian and written by Nick Bernardone, with Alex Coley Brown and Rob Newman serving as producers.

== Plot ==
Tracks the life of the iconic red-handled machete used by Rick Grimes. The blade changes hands among multiple survivors, moving from an innocent hardware store shelf to the hands of innocent survivors, the Claimers, Rick Grimes, Negan's Saviors and back to its original owner.

== Cast ==
- Anais Lilit as Mandy
- Jose Rosete as David
- Sofia Esmaili as Alyssa
- Christopher Troy as Young Man
- Michael Wayne Foster as Derek
- Jeff Kober as Joe
- Davi Jay as Tony
- Jonathan Richard King as Jerel
- Hamid-Reza Benjamin Thompson as Saviour

== Release ==
AMC ran for 16 episodes from October 22, 2017 to April 15, 2018.

== Recognition ==
In 2018, it was announced that the series writer, Nick Bernardone had been nominated for that year's Writers Guild of America Awards. Additionally, the series also received a nomination at the Primetime Emmy Awards.

== Reception ==
Critical reviews for Red Machete were mostly positive. Forbes claimed that "Red Machete is the best thing 'The Walking Dead' has done all year", saying they'd hope to see more "experimental projects like this from AMC in the future".

Digital Spy called it "The Walking Dead spin-off you didn't know existed", and praised it as a must watch.

== Awards ==
Festival	Award Title	Status	Year
Writers Guild of America Awards	Best Short Series	Nominated	2018-2019
Primetime Emmy Awards	Best Web-Series	Nominated	2018

== Episodes ==
Title	Plot	Release Date	Year
Red Machete: Part One	A young man in a hardware store under zombie attack unwraps a Machete in order to fight for his life.	October 22	2017
Red Machete: Part Two	The Machete passes to David and his daughters and he trains his oldest Mandy on how to wield it whilst food stocks run low.	October 29	2017
Red Machete: Part Three	While David, Mandy and Alyssa are on the move, tragedy strikes.	November 5	2017
Red Machete: Part Four	The family mourn their loss and continue to hone their survival techniques.	November 12	2017
Red Machete: Part Five	David makes a tragic misjudgment after a day of fishing.	November 19	2017
Red Machete: Part Six	Mandy crosses paths with some looters who take her prized possession.	November 26	2017
Red Machete: Part Seven	Derek takes a break to overhaul his new Machete but danger lurks nearby.	December 3	2017
Red Machete: Part Eight	The Machete travels around in a Walker's chest until it is 'claimed' by a new owner.	December 10	2017
Red Machete: What We Become	Joe and his gang, pillage and plunder anywhere and anyone they come across.	February 25	2018
Red Machete: The Hunters	A couple of sneak thieves attempt to steal from Joe's gang.	March 4	2018
Red Machete: Among Them	The Machete passes into the hands of Rick Grimes.	March 11	2018
Red Machete: A Way Out	A Savior goes AWOL from the Sanctuary with the Machete.	March 18	2018
Red Machete: Gone	The Machete sits alone in a field as the world goes by.	March 25	2018
Red Machete: We Find Ourselves	The Machete is reunited with a former owner.	April 1	2018
Red Machete: A Forgotten World	Mandy returns to old stomping grounds.	April 8	2018
Red Machete: A New Beginning	The Machete's journey comes to an end...or does it?	April 15	2018
