= Blue (web series) =

American drama web series (2012–2015)

- Genre: Drama; Web series
- Created by: Rodrigo García
- Written by: Rodrigo García
- Directed by: Rodrigo García
- Starring: Julia Stiles; Uriah Shelton; David Harbour; Jeanne Tripplehorn; Alexz Johnson
- Composers: Thomas Newman (main and end title themes); Jacob Yoffee
- Country of origin: United States
- Original language: English
- No. of seasons: 3
- No. of episodes: 42 (web); 10 (compilations)

Production
- Executive producers: Jon Avnet; Rodrigo García; Jake Avnet
- Producer: Rodrigo García
- Running time: 42 minutes
- Production companies: WIGS; Vixen Studios LLC

Original release
- Network: WIGS
- Release: June 11, 2012 – 2015

Blue is an American drama web series created by Rodrigo García and starring Julia Stiles. The pilot episode aired on June 11, 2012. It originally aired on the WIGS channel on YouTube but eventually streamed on Hulu, Fox.com, and WIGS' own website for its third season, which takes the form of four long-form episodes lasting 40–60 minutes rather than the shorter episodes of the first two seasons.

Since its release, Blue has garnered several accolades, including a Satellite Award nomination in 2013, Art Directors Guild Award nomination for Production Design - (Myers) in 2014, and three IAWTV Awards, for Best Director – Drama (García) in 2014 and Best Actress – Drama (Stiles) in 2013 and 2014.

== Plot ==
Blue (Julia Stiles) is a mother living in Los Angeles with a secret life as a sex worker. She’ll do anything to keep it from her son Josh (Uriah Shelton). But her past has other plans.

== Cast ==
=== Main ===
Actor	Character	Episodes	Seasons		
Actor	Character	Episodes	1	2	3
Julia Stiles	Blue	40	Main	Main	Main
Uriah Shelton	Josh	24	Main	Main	Main

=== Others ===
- Brooklyn Lowe as Francesca
- Kathleen Quinlan as Jessica
- Carla Gallo as Rose
- James Morrison as Olsen
- Brian Shortall as Will
- Alexz Johnson as Satya
- Jacob Vargas as Roy
- Jane Stiles O'Hara as Lara
- Eric Stoltz as Arthur
- Amir Arison as Leonard
- David Harbour as Cooper
- Taylor Nichols as Bill
- Rocky Carroll as Robert
- Kendall Custer as May
- Michael Hyatt as Claire
- Daren Kagasoff as Daren
- Chad Lindberg as Sam
- Sarah Stoecker as Hunter
- Joel McKinnon Miller as Mr. Weston
- Sarah Paulson as Lavinia
- Laura Spencer as Vanessa
- Mark Consuelos as Daniel
- Wanda De Jesus as Cynthia
- William Petersen as Mitch
- Samantha Quan as Dana
- Michelle Forbes as Marisa
- Richard Pagano as Mick
- Holly Robinson Peete as Holly
- Cassidy Boyd as Alicia
- Darin Heames as Nicolas
- Manny Jimenez Jr. as Ernesto
- JC Gonzalez as Harry
- James Jordan as Raphael
- Tony Plana as Stribling
- Jeanne Tripplehorn as Vera

== Television broadcasts ==
For television broadcast the series has been edited into 10 one-hour-long episodes (with the first six made up of compilations of the short-form shows), and airs on Lifetime's international channels (including the UK and Africa). The dates below correspond to their first airdates in Britain. The series premiered in the United States on LMN on July 8, 2016 under the title Blue: A Secret Life.

Each compilation is named after a line of dialogue. The webisodes are not all used in the order they were shown online. Julia Stiles does not appear in webisodes marked with an asterisk. In the United States, LMN aired the contents of the third season over five compilation episodes titled "Call Me Francine", "Take Off Your Clothes", "A History of Anxiety", "Your Favorite Client", and "Choices".

Episode	Webisodes	Episode title	Webisode titles	Directed by	Written by	Broadcast date
1	Season 1, ep.1–6	"Blue Rules"	"Mom" "Son" "You Rule" "Long Day, Blue?" "You're Good" "Jack The Ripper"	Rodrigo García	Rodrigo García	March 2, 2015
2	Season 1, ep. 7–12	"When Have I Lied To You?"	"Paying For Sex" "A Decent Girl" "That's My Drug" "Star Student" "You Lie To Me Too" "Give An Old Man A Break"	Rodrigo García	Rodrigo García	March 9, 2015
3	Season 2, ep. 1–7	"Who Raises A Child Like This?"	"See And Be Seen" "What Kind Of A Name Is Blue?" "It's Just A Crutch" "Everything Is A Test" "How Do You Do?" "Glue And Lubricant" "Wow, Wow, Wow"	Rodrigo García	Rodrigo García and Karen Graci	March 16, 2015
4	Season 2, ep. 8–13, 15	"We Were In Love"	"On My Own" "The Truth Hurts" "A Man's Permission" "Make Yourself At Home" "Old Habits Die Hard" "Doubling The Equation"* "In The Running"	Rodrigo García	Rodrigo García and Karen Graci	March 23, 2015
5	Season 2, ep. 21, 16–20	"Good Looking Boy"	"Savages" "Hard Time" "The Details" "You're Not A Freak, Are You?" "Getting To The Point" "I'm Not A Stalker"	Rodrigo García	Rodrigo García and Karen Graci	March 30, 2015
6	Season 2, ep. 14, 22–26	"Where Were You, Mom?"	"Are You Clean?" "Role Play"* "Winning With" "A Straight Answer" "Choices Add Up" "Where Were You?"	Rodrigo García	Rodrigo García and Karen Graci	April 6, 2015
7	Season 3, episode 1	"Call Me Francine"		Rodrigo García	Rodrigo García	April 13, 2015
8	Season 3, episode 2	"Planets Colliding"		Rodrigo García	Rodrigo García and Karen Graci	April 20, 2015
9	Season 3, episode 3	"A History Of Anxiety"		Rodrigo García	Rodrigo García	April 27, 2015
10	Season 3, episode 4	"Make Me Feel Good"		Rodrigo García	Rodrigo García and Karen Graci	May 4, 2015

== Awards and nominations ==
Year	Association	Category	Nominee(s)	Result
2013	Satellite Awards	Best Original Short-Format Program	Blue	Nominated
2014	Art Directors Guild	Short Format, Live Action Series	Rachel Myers, Philip Toolin, Kurt Meisenbach (Episode: "The Truth Hurts")	Nominated
2014	IAWTV Awards	Best Director – Drama	Rodrigo García	Won
2014	IAWTV Awards	Best Female Performance – Drama	Julia Stiles	Won
