= Rachael Hip-Flores =

American actress

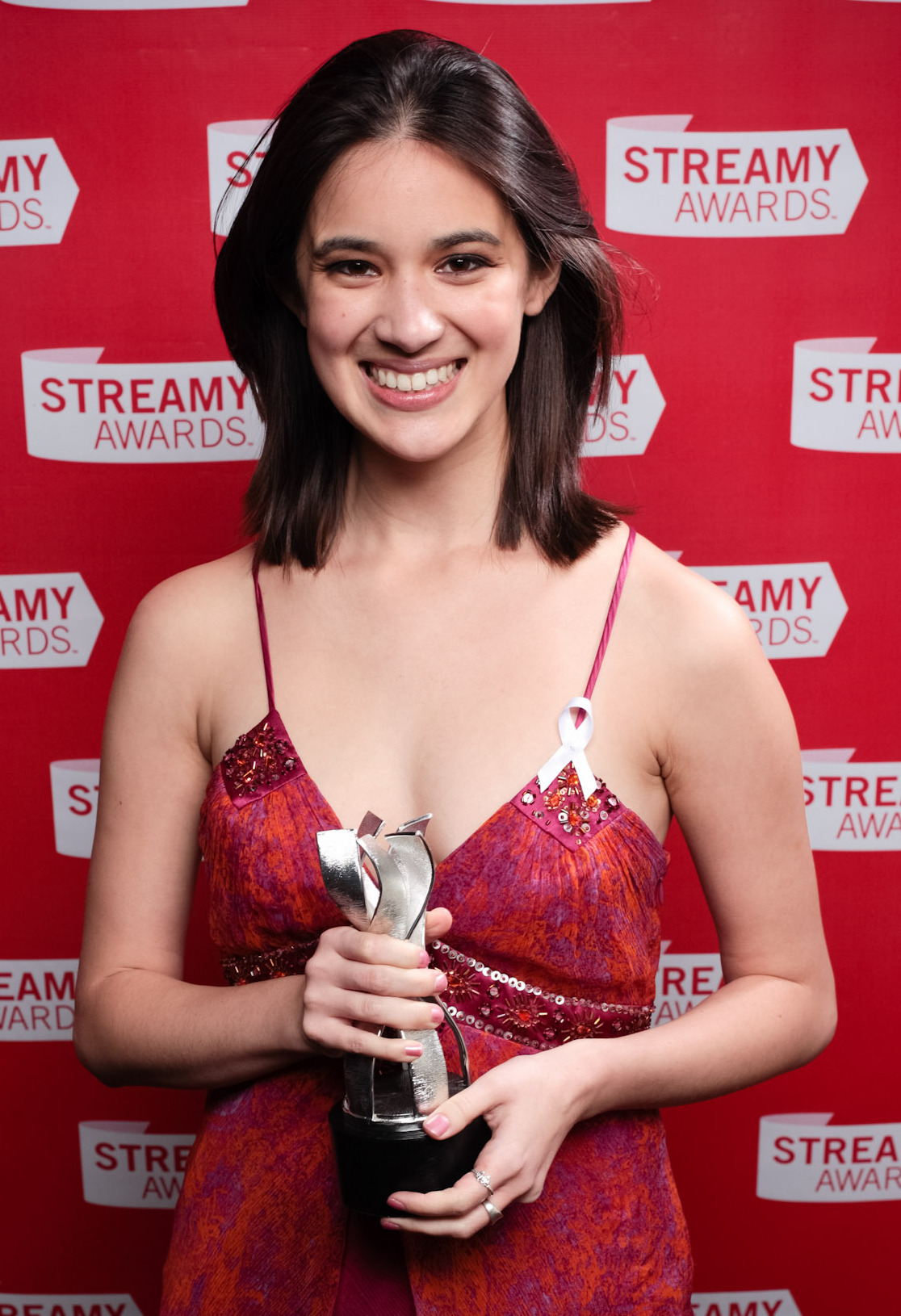
- Hip-Flores at the Streamy Awards in 2010
- Born: Piscataway, New Jersey
- Occupation: Actress
- Years active: 2000s–present

Rachael Lauren Hip-Flores is an American actress. Born and raised in Piscataway, New Jersey, she is known for her role in the web series Anyone But Me, for which she received the IAWTV, Streamy, and Indie Series Awards for Best Lead Actress in a Drama Series. She also played a lead role in the web series Producing Juliet for which she received nominations for Best Ensemble Cast and starred in a series called Good people in love, for this she was nominated for Best Lead Actress in a Drama. She also appeared as a leading actress in the two webseries, Shadow Free and Lucercia.

== Works ==
- Anyone But Me
- Good People in Love
- Gossip Girl
- Lucrecia (HBO New York Latino Film Festival, San Diego Latino Film Festival)
- Mordere
- Shadow Free
- One Voice Many Faces
- Guards of Dagmar
- The Temp Life
- Geek vs Geek
- Producing Juliet

== Selected Theater ==
New York

- Hearts Like Fists (Flux Theatre)
- Eschaton Cabaret (Bowery Poetry Club)
- Deinde (Flux Theatre)
- Narrator 1 (Lion Theater at Theatre Row)
- Two Gentlemen of Verona (TBG Theater)
- Trying (Bushwick Starr)
- Flight of the Shaman (with Eric Walton)
- Summer and Smoke (Clurman Theater at Theatre Row)

London

- Much Ado About Nothing (Shakespeare's Globe)

== See also ==
- List of Streamy Award winners
- 2nd Streamy Awards (2010)
