= Time Expired (2011 film) =

- Directed by: Nick Lawrence
- Written by: Rachel Tucker
- Produced by: Rachel Tucker; Nick Lawrence
- Starring: Eric Starkey; Topher Owen; Carrie Slaughter; Rebekah Turner
- Cinematography: Jason Musco
- Edited by: Ethan Holzman
- Release date: April 14, 2011 (WorldFest-Houston International Film Festival)
- Running time: 93 minutes
- Country: United States
- Language: English

Time Expired is a 2011 comedy-drama film directed by Nick Lawrence, written by Rachel Tucker, and starring Eric Starkey, Topher Owen, Carrie Slaughter, and Rebekah Turner. It was shot in Oklahoma for a budget of $26,000. It premiered at WorldFest-Houston International Film Festival in April, 2011, where it won a Silver Remi award for best comedy feature.

It was released on VODO under a Creative Commons Attribution-NonCommercial 3.0 License.

== Premise ==
Randall, a meter maid with a terminal illness, wishes to live out his last days quietly, but his friends and family have other ideas.
