= Anyone but Me =

American web series

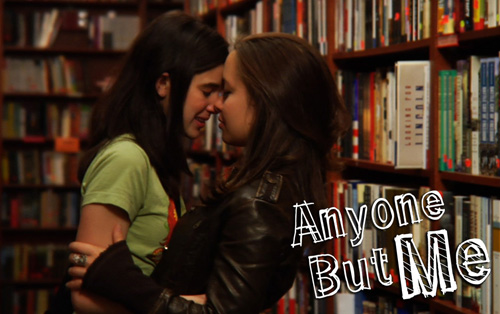
- Genre: Drama
- Written by: Susan Miller; Tina Cesa Ward
- Directed by: Tina Cesa Ward
- Starring: Rachael Hip-Flores; Nicole Pacent; Jessy Hodges; Joshua Holland; Alexis Slade; Mitchell S. Adams; Barbara Pitts; Dan Via; Liza Weil
- Ending theme: Noah Figlin
- Country of origin: United States
- Original language: English
- No. of seasons: 3
- No. of episodes: 31

Production
- Executive producers: Susan Miller; Tina Cesa Ward
- Production location: New York
- Editor: Tina Cesa Ward
- Camera setup: Ava Berkofsky
- Running time: 6–15 minutes

Original release
- Release: 2008 – 2011

Anyone but Me is an American web series created by Tina Cesa Ward. The series first aired on Strike.TV in 2008, and has since been offered on its own website and on other online streaming platforms such as YouTube, Binge Networks, and Hulu. The series focuses on LGBT themes and is presented in serial short-format webisodes, each lasting between six and fifteen minutes, following the lives of a group of teenagers in New York City and Westchester County, New York.

== Background ==
The series was developed by Tina Cesa Ward and playwright Susan Miller from Ward's original work.

== Plot overview ==
The series centers around the experiences of Vivian McMillan (Rachael Hip-Flores), a sixteen-year-old lesbian whose father's illness prompts the two of them to move from Manhattan to the home of Vivian's maternal aunt in Westchester, about 30 minutes away. Vivian attempts to maintain her relationship with her girlfriend Aster Gaston (Nicole Pacent) while enrolling in a new school, negotiating old childhood connections, and establishing a new social circle in what she perceives to be a substantially different environment from her previous home in the city.

== Cast and characters ==
- Rachael Hip-Flores as Vivian McMillan
- Nicole Pacent as Aster Gaston
- Johnny Yoder as Breck (Manhattan School Friend)
- Barbara Pitts as Jodie Nevan
- Dan Via as Gabe McMillan
- Jessy Hodges as Sophie Parker
- Joshua Holland as Archibald Bishop
- Alexis Slade as Elisabeth Matthews
- Mitchell S. Adams as Jonathan Kerwin
- Garett Ross as Sterns
- Amy Jackson Lewis as Jamie
- Liza Weil as Dr. Glass
- Russell Jordan as Principal Dennis
- Helene Taylor as Mrs. Winters (Homeroom)
- Marissa Skell as Carey (Architect Student)

== Themes ==
=== The closet ===
As the series begins, Vivian has been living as an openly gay high-school student whose romance with Aster appears well known to those around her. When she arrives at her new suburban home and school, she declines to reveal her sexuality or relationship to her aunt, to a local schoolmate she has known since childhood, or to most of her peers. In public, she also frequently minimizes Aster's role in her life to avoid exposure of the sexual nature of their relationship. This sets up a number of conflicts as well as a dialogue in episode 8 of season 1 on whether or not gay pride is an essential element of an intimate gay relationship.

=== Changing social attitudes in suburban America ===
Vivian's anxiety about publicizing her sexuality in Westchester is driven by her belief that her family and friends living there would not be as tolerant or accepting as she found them to be in Manhattan. The one person who quickly discovers Vivian's secret is Archibald (Joshua Holland), an African-American student at her school. In episode 3 of season 1, Vivian and Archibald discuss their common feeling that a largely white, traditional community would never fully embrace them because of their minority status. This perception is challenged by other characters, including Vivian's childhood friend Sophie (Jessy Hodges), who upon learning the truth is less upset that Vivian is gay and more offended that Vivian assumed she would be intolerant.

=== Lingering effects of 9/11 ===
The show's creators bill the story as a search "for love and belonging in the post-9/11 age". Vivian's father Gabe (Dan Via) is a former New York City firefighter who suffers from respiratory problems appearing to arise from his work at Ground Zero, prompting his move with his daughter out of the city center. In episode 3 of season 1, Vivian's father describes the move away from New York City as intended to allow Vivian to experience her adolescence without having to constantly deal with the consequences the attacks have had on their lives.

== Reception ==
Interest in the series has been heaviest amongst LGBT media, with generally positive reviews from outlets such as Curve and GO magazines. The mainstream audience New York Observer's Gillian Reagan described Anyone but Me as a show that "succeeds in showing us the potential of the [web-original] medium."

In 2014 Anyone but Me was listed on New Media Rockstars Top 100 YouTube Channels, ranked at #33.
